= Belarusian State =

Former country of Europe

Belarusian State Беларуская Дзяржава (Belarusian) Biełaruskaja Dziaržava
- 1920
- Flag

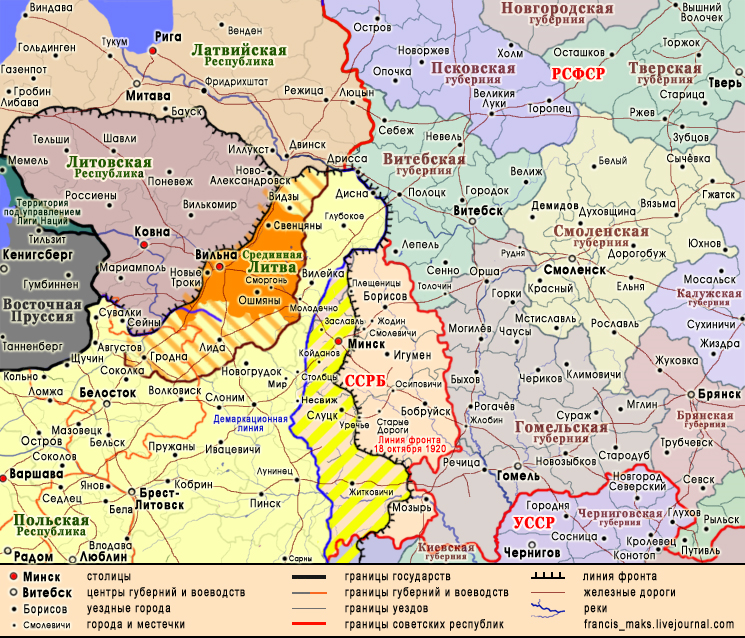
- Status: Rebel state during the civil war
- Common languages: Belarusian; Minority languages: Russian; Polish; Yiddish; Ukrainian
- Religion: Christianity
- Government: Provisional government under military dictatorship
- History
  - Established: 7 November 1920
  - Disestablished: 31 December
Preceded by	Succeeded by
Belarusian People's Republic; LitBel SSR	Byelorussian SSR
- Today part of: Belarus

Belarusian State (Belarusian: Беларуская Дзяржава, romanized: Biełaruskaja Dziaržava), also the Second Belarusian People's Republic or the Provisional Government of Belarus (in some sources "Kingdom of Belarus"), was a state proclaimed in Turau on November 7, 1920 by the troops of Marshal of the Belarusian People's Republic Stanisław Bułak-Bałachowicz.

== History ==
=== Prehistory ===
By agreement with the Rada of the Belarusian People's Republic, Bułak-Bałachowicz was recognized as the commander-in-chief of the armed forces of Belarus and ordered the formation (separately from the Russian People's Volunteer Army) of the Belarusian People's Army - consisting of the Peasant Division of chieftain Iskra, the "Zialony dub" ("Green Oak") detachments, and the Special Belarusian Battalion of the 2nd Infantry Division.

According to the armistice agreement with the RSFSR of October 12, 1920, Polish troops left Minsk, but anti-Soviet formations in Polish-controlled territory were disbanded. Despite this, the Polish command developed a plan for a new campaign. Józef Piłsudski counted on the formation of a federation of Poland, Lithuania, Ukraine and Belarus, which would become the Second Polish-Lithuanian Commonwealth. Bułak-Bałachowicz was to tie up units of the Red Army in Belarus and prevent them from being transferred to the Southern Front to pursue General Wrangel in the Crimea.

Bułak-Bałachowicz and Savinkov jointly formed the Russian People's Volunteer Army, numbering 7,860 bayonets and 3,500 sabers. These were three divisions, one brigade, a cavalry regiment, a Don Cossack regiment, an air squadron, an armored train, and two artillery batteries. The army consisted mainly of former prisoners of war and local partisans dissatisfied with the Soviet government. Savinkov headed the Russian Political Committee and counted on the formation of a republic. It was assumed that if the offensive was successful, he would continue it to Moscow. When the preparatory work was completed, the assembled forces were taken to the starting line to the demarcation line.

=== Bułak-Bałachowicz's campaign ===
The Russian People's Volunteer Army of Major General Bułak-Bałachowicz consisted of three infantry and one cavalry division, a separate brigade and separate units with a total strength of about 20,000 people. The 1st Infantry Division of Death, consisting of experienced fighters who had experience in partisan warfare in wooded areas, was of the greatest value. Other troops, consisting largely of captured Red Army soldiers, were worse trained and less reliable. The forces of the 16th Army of the Western Front and the 12th Army of the Southwestern Front, which opposed the RPVA, were exhausted by the last unsuccessful battles of the Soviet-Polish war. The plan of the RPVA leadership was based on the supposed weakness of the Soviet troops and the reluctance of the Red Army soldiers to fight for Soviet power. It was planned to strike at Mazyr, and then send troops along the diverging flanks to Babruysk, Homyel and Kyiv. B. V. Savinkov, to whom Bułak-Bałachowicz was subordinate, even hoped that the occupation of Belarus would begin a campaign against Moscow. The Soviet command did not count on a quick start to the offensive and kept most of the troops in the rear, guarding the demarcation line with weak forces.

=== End of the campaign ===
After the capture of Mazyr, Bułak-Bałachowicz's army changed the direction of the main attack. Instead of the Babruysk-Minsk route, it began to move towards Rechytsa and Homyel, to link up with the troops of Pyotr Wrangel. However, the campaigns to Moscow and Kaunas failed, as did the calculation of a peasant uprising in front-line Belarus. Former Russian prisoners of war, who formed the basis of the rebel army, were not going to fight for an independent Belarus and went over to the side of the Red Army.

Stanisław Bułak-Bałachowicz did not go with Savinkov, but remained with the main part of the troops in Mazyr to turn the city into a fortress. The news of the defeat of the "black baron" in the Crimea broke the fighting spirit of the rebels, while Savinkov failed to take Rechytsa. A wide propaganda campaign was launched in the Soviet press. On November 13, 1920, the newspaper Zvyazda published the article "Let's defeat Bałachowicz!", and when the general counteroffensive began, new publications appeared: "The Flight of the Bałachowiczes", "On the heels of the pogromists", etc.

Meanwhile, the commander of the Western Front, Mikhail Tukhachevsky, brought significant forces to Palessie, moved them from the direction of Zhlobin on November 16 and entered Kalinkavichy the next day. Fearing encirclement, the Bałachowiczes lifted the siege of Rechytsa and on November 19 began to retreat along the entire front. The Second Infantry Division stubbornly defended Mazyr, but on November 20 it fell. On November 21, 1920, the Mazyr District Military Revolutionary Committee reported that gangs of rebels had been scattered throughout the district. At the same time, it was indicated that those guilty of harboring bandits would be punished “up to and including execution.”

However, Tukhachevsky failed to completely destroy the enemy. On November 22, the main forces of Bułak-Bałachowicz broke through the barriers of the Kuban Cossack Division in the Kaplychi-Yakimovychi area, forced Ptsich and through Zhytkavichy reached the location of the Polish troops. In the area of Turaw, Davyd-Haradok and Lakhva, the Bałachowiczes were disarmed by the Polish side. Savinkov escaped from the encirclement in the Petrykov area. Small units of the first and second divisions crossed the border with him, and more than 4,500 soldiers and 120 officers were captured. Part of the Bałachowiczes remained in the neutral zone, from where they continued their sorties until the beginning of 1922.

In March 1921, the Riga Peace Treaty divided Belarus into Eastern (Soviet) and Western (Polish).

== Bułak-Bałachowicz's government ==
Positions
- Head of the Belarusian State, Stanisław Bułak-Bałachowicz
  - Prime Minister, Pavieł Alaksiuk
    - Head of the RPC, Boris Savinkov
    - Head of the Belarusian Political Committee, Viačasłaŭ Adamovič
      - Minister of Education, Radasłaŭ Astroŭski
      - Members of the Provisional Government
  - Edward Woyniłłowicz
  - Raman Skirmunt
  - Jerzy Czapski

On November 12, 1920, Bułak-Bałachowicz arrived in Mazyr. Members of the Belarusian Political Committee (BPC), established in Warsaw in October, arrived with him. It was this organization, by agreement with Bułak-Bałachowicz (and a separate agreement with Savinkov), that transferred power in the Belarusian territories occupied by the RPVA. The committee was transformed into the government of Belarus headed by Viačasłaŭ Adamovič.

=== Reorganization of the Government and Dissolution of the Rada of the BNR ===
The newly formed government appointed Bułak-Bałachowicz as the "Head of the Belarusian State" (a complete analogy with the position of Józef Piłsudski). Other orders were the establishment of civil authorities in Mazyr County, Turaw gmina, and the town of Turaw itself. Thus, a national administration began to function on the territory of Mazyr County. Bułak-Bałachowicz announced the dissolution of the Rada of the Belarusian People's Republic and the re-formation of the BPC into the Rada of the "New BNR", not recognizing the remaining governments (the government of Lastowsky in Kaunas, and Luckevich in Warsaw). The head of the BPC, Pavieł Alaksiuk, was appointed Minister of Foreign Affairs.

In the new government, Bułak-Bałachowicz included monarchist-minded krajowcy and landowners, each of whom had previously been in the Homeland Party of Lithuania and Belarus: Edward Woyniłłowicz, Raman Skirmunt, Jerzy Czapski, Olgierd Świda.

From the memoirs of Edward Woyniłłowicz:

General Stanisław Bułak-Bałachowicz occupied Minsk and Belarus and is going to declare his self-determination. Even the provisional government is almost created, its composition includes: me, R. Skirmunt, Jerzy Czapski and Olgierd Świda, which was already a clear exaggeration, since Bułak-Bałachowicz was at that time between Pinsk and Mazyr. In Minsk, after the signing of the armistice, 140 people were shot, whose names were given to Rachkevych. This is the first result of the Riga armistice.

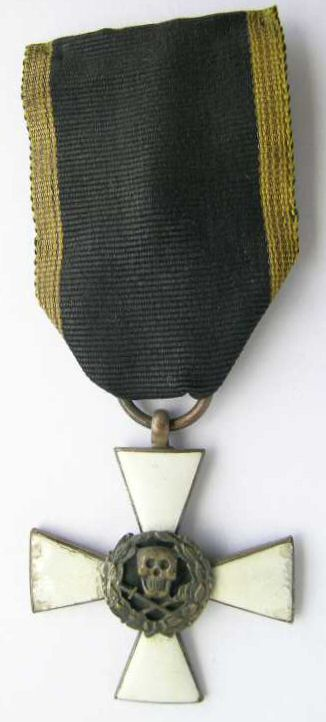
Cross of Bułak-Bałachowicz

Bułak-Bałachowicz also introduced a separate order badge, the "Cross of the Brave".

At the same time, in Slutsk county, the national administration is also working, and a county council is even elected. However, it is oriented towards the Supreme Rada of the Belarusian People's Republic and the government of Arkadź Smolič. And no other "government of Belarus" recognizes the BPC. Moreover, supporters of the BPC and Bułak-Bałachowicz are later removed from the leadership and even arrested. The situation is made more curious by the fact that both the Committee and the Rada are based in Warsaw and are pro-Polish. And in Kaunas at this time there is also the People's Rada of the Belarusian People's Republic with the government of Lastowsky, although without territories, unlike the Slutsk Belarusian People's Republic and Bułak-Bałachowicz's Belarusian People's Republic.

Both BNRs almost simultaneously acquired an official national army - on November 14, Bułak-Bałachowicz issued an order to allocate personnel from the Russian People's Volunteer Army to form the Belarusian Volunteer Army as part of the Peasant Division of chieftain Iskra, the "Zialony dub" ("Green Oak") detachments, and the Special Belarusian Battalion. (in fact, the recruitment of the Belarusian battalion began on November 10), proclaiming himself the commander-in-chief of the Belarusian Armed Forces. The formation of a rifle brigade begins in Slutsk.

=== The question of recognition of the independence of the Belarusian State by the Constituent Assembly ===
On November 16, the head of the RPC Savinkov and the commander-in-chief of the armed forces in Belarus Bułak-Bałachowicz, on the one hand, the head of the BPC Viačasłaŭ Adamovič and BPC member Pavieł Alaksiuk, on the other hand, signed a new agreement on the recognition of the independence of the Belarusian State:

«The final form of relations between Russia and Belarus will be determined by an agreement between the Constituent Assemblies of Russia and Belarus or the Governments established by these Constituent Assemblies».

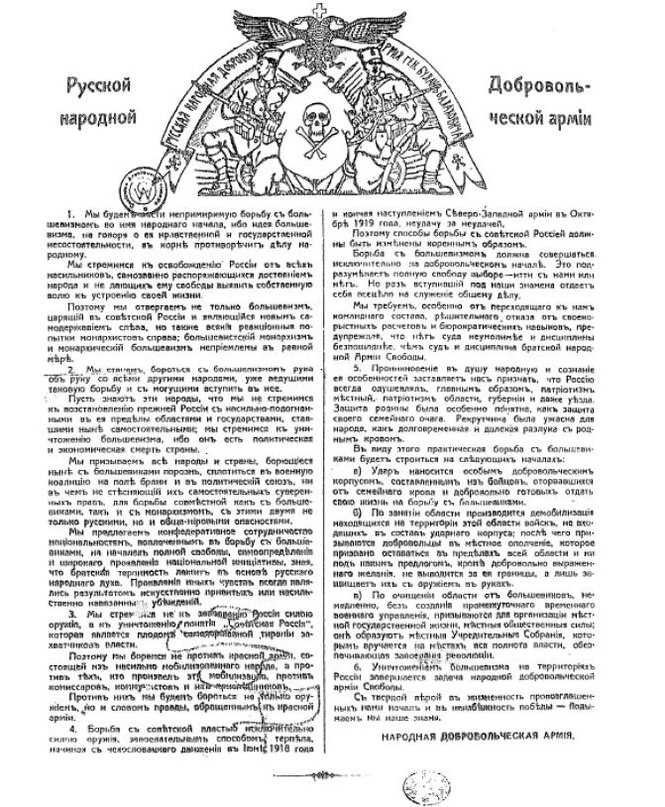
Postcard with the political declaration of the RPVA

By November 17, the Headquarters of the Main Command was organized in Mazyr, where a Polish liaison officer was present and the government of the new Belarusian People's Republic met. On November 16, the BPC, B. V. Savinkov (on behalf of the RPC), and Bułak-Bałachowicz concluded an agreement according to which the form of integration of Belarus and Russia should be determined by the constituent assemblies of these territories, but the Head of the Belarusian State was allowed to engage in state construction. Because of these Belarusian state experiments, Bułak-Bałachowicz parted ways with his brother Bałachowicz, whom he made a major general and commander of the PVA. Bałachowicz II advocated rapprochement with Wrangel (Permikin's army in Poland) and the protection of all-Russian interests, as did the authoritative general Lokhvitsky. Despite everything, the authority of the BPC and the government created from it was low. Some Belarusians of the PVA considered the members of the BPC traitors and spies. The officers of the battalion of Captain Demidov of the Ostrovsky Regiment decided to eliminate Pavieł Alaksiuk, the vice-premier and minister of foreign affairs of the new BNR. But the minister turned out to be more agile and fled to Poland. However, the officers caught up with him in Vilshany, and if it were not for the Polish commandant, the plan would have been fulfilled.

Paul Gorguloff, a Russian writer, politician, and assassin of the President of the French Republic, also managed to visit Minsk, which was occupied by the Bałachowiczes.

== The question of monarchy ==
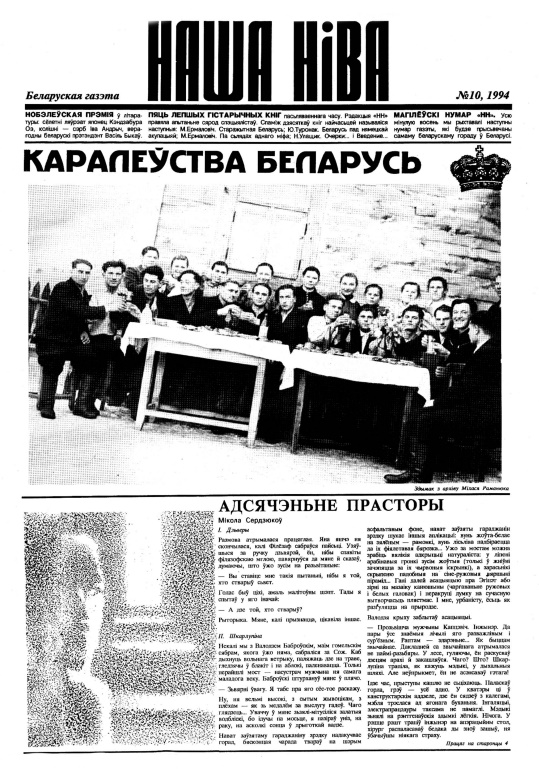

Bułak-Bałachowicz's government, in addition to members of the Belarusian Political Committee, consisted of landowners and monarchists, supporters of the krajowcy movement.

"Stanisłaŭ-Pavieł Leŭ-Sapieha-Voj" claimed the Belarusian throne. This candidate for the Belarusian throne showered Belarusian officials in Vilnius with his letters. He had special support from the German Empire during the German occupation of Belarus. When in early 1919 a diplomatic mission of the Belarusian People's Republic arrived in Berlin with Albrecht Radziwill and Raman Skirmunt, the "prince" allowed her to meet him personally and took on the minor needs of the mission in finding suitable housing, buying necessary things, etc.

Later, the prince wrote a letter to Kastuś Jezavitaŭ, informing him of the Sapieha family's claims to the Belarusian throne. Jezavitaŭ considered the prince the most realistic candidate for the position of monarch of the Belarusian State.

== In modern historiography ==
In the official historiography of modern Belarus, the topic of Stanislav Bulak-Balahovich's campaigns is not popularized; moreover, the Ministry of Education does not give any assessment of the actions of the Bałachowiczes.

However, Belarusian newspapers (such as "Nasha Niva") published several articles on the subject of this marshal.

In the 10th issue of the newspaper "Nasha Niva", the history of the Bułak-Bałachowicz Campaign was mentioned, and directly the Belarusian State, but under the name "Kingdom of Belarus".
