= Belarusian People's Republic =

Short-lived state in Eastern Europe (1918–1919)

Belarusian People's Republic Беларуская Народная Рэспубліка (Belarusian) Biełaruskaja Narodnaja Respublika
- 1918–1919; Exile: 1919–present
- Flag Coat of arms
- Anthem: Ваяцкі марш Vajacki marš "March of the Warriors"
- Government seal

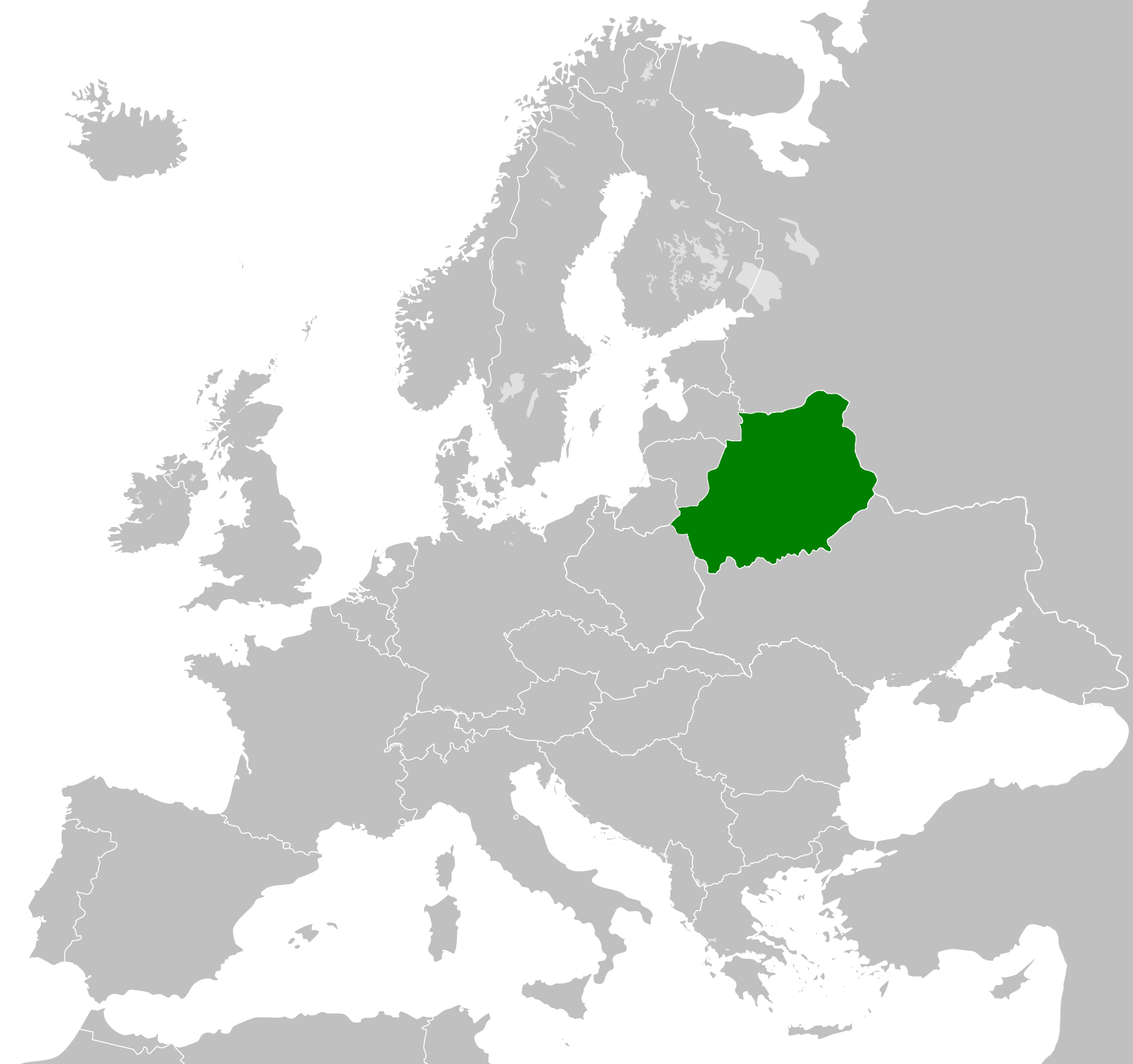
- Land claimed by the BNR at the time
- Status: Partially recognized state under German occupation (1918); Government in exile (1919–present)
- Capital: 1918 Minsk · Vilnius; 1918–1919 Hrodna
- Capital-in-exile: 1919–1923 Kaunas; 1923–1945 Prague; 1948–1970 Paris; 1970–1983 Toronto; 1983–present Ottawa
- Common languages: Belarusian; Minority languages: Russian; Polish; Yiddish; Lithuanian; Ukrainian
- Demonym: Belarusian
- Government: Unitary parliamentary republic under a provisional government
- President of the Rada
  - 1918: Jan Sierada
  - 1918–1919: Jazep Losik (acting)
- President in exile
  - 1919–1928: Piotra Krečeŭski
  - 1928–1943: Vasil Zacharka
  - 1943–1970: Mikoła Abramčyk
  - 1970–1982: Vincent Žuk-Hryškievič
  - 1982–1997: Jazep Sažyč
  - 1997–present: Ivonka Survilla
- Legislature: Rada
- Historical era: World War I
  - Established: 6 March 1918
  - Independence proclaimed: 25 March 1918
  - Fall of Minsk: 10 December 1918
  - Disestablished: 28 April 1919
  - In exile: 1919–present
- Currency: Ruble
Preceded by
Russian Republic
Russian SFSR
Succeeded by
LitBel SSR
Second Polish Republic
Belarusian government-in-exile
Belarusian State
- Today part of: Belarus; Poland; Russia; Ukraine

The Belarusian People's Republic (BNR; Belarusian: Беларуская Народная Рэспубліка, romanized: Biełaruskaja Narodnaja Respublika, БНР), also known as the Belarusian Democratic Republic, was a state proclaimed by the Council of the Belarusian Democratic Republic in its Second Constituent Charter on 9 March 1918 during World War I. The Council proclaimed the Belarusian Democratic Republic independent in its Third Constituent Charter on 25 March 1918 during the occupation of contemporary Belarus by the Imperial German Army.

The government of the Belarusian Democratic Republic never had power over the whole territory of Belarus. In 1919, it co-existed with an alternative Soviet Russia-controlled Socialist Soviet Republic of Byelorussia (which later became part of the Lithuanian–Byelorussian Soviet Socialist Republic), moving its seat of government to Vilnius and Hrodna, but ceased to exist due to the partition of the whole Belarusian territory between the Bolshevik Red Army and the Polish Armed Forces as a result of the Polish–Soviet War of 1919–1921.

The idea of creating a new Belarusian state was proposed in December 1917 by a group of delegates at the First All-Belarusian Congress in Minsk, but the congress was dispersed by the Bolsheviks. Just a few hours before Minsk was occupied by troops of the German Empire on February 21, the Executive Committee of the All-Belarusian Congress, through its First Constituent Charter, declared itself the authority in the region and formed a provisional government (the People's Secretariat). On March 25, under conditions of German occupation, the Third Constituent Charter proclaimed Belarus an independent and free state.

After Germany’s defeat in the World War and the annulment of the Treaty of Brest-Litovsk, German forces began to withdraw from the occupied territories. By December 1918, units of the Red Army had already entered Minsk. The government of the Belarusian People's Republic (BNR) continued its activities in exile. In October 1925, the All-Belarusian Political Conference in Berlin announced the dissolution of the BNR. Many prominent figures of the BNR — Arkadź Smolič, Vatslaw Lastowski, Alaksandar Ćvikievič, Jazep Losik, and others — returned to the Belarusian SSR, only to be later repressed.

Currently, its government in exile is the Rada (Council) of the Belarusian Democratic Republic.

== Name ==
In some historical documents, the White Ruthenian Democratic Republic phrase was used initially. In the current scholarship, Belarusian Democratic Republic and Belarusian National Republic names dominate. The Rada BNR uses the Belarusian Democratic Republic name. It also appears in the publications originating in Belarus. The Belarusian People's Republic appears in publications, however, its use is comparatively limited, e.g. it does not appear in the titles of scholarly publications.

== History ==
=== Background ===
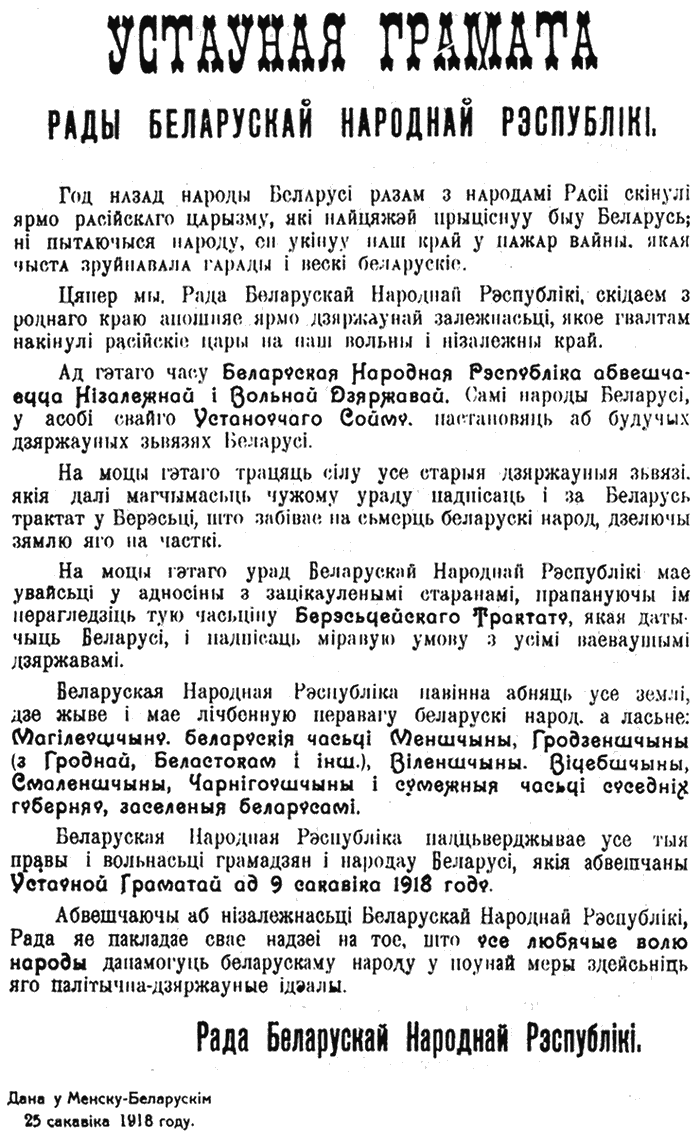
Third charter of BNR

Minsk. The Belarusian national flag above the building of the People's Secretariat of the Belarusian People's Republic.

After the 1917 February Revolution in Russia, active discussions started in Belarus about either gaining autonomy within the new Russian Republic or declaring independence. Deputies of most Belarusian regions and of different political powers, including the Belarusian Socialist Assembly, the Christian democratic movement and the General Jewish Labour Bund, formed a Belarusian National Council in late 1917. The Council started working on establishing Belarusian governmental institutions. Both the Bolsheviks and Germans refused to recognize it and interfered in its activity. However, the Germans saw an independent Belarus as part of the implementation of their plan for buffer states within Mitteleuropa. The Bolsheviks had negotiations with the Belarusian Democratic Republic regarding eventual recognition, but later decided instead to establish a pro-Soviet government of Belarus – the Soviet Socialist Republic of Byelorussia.

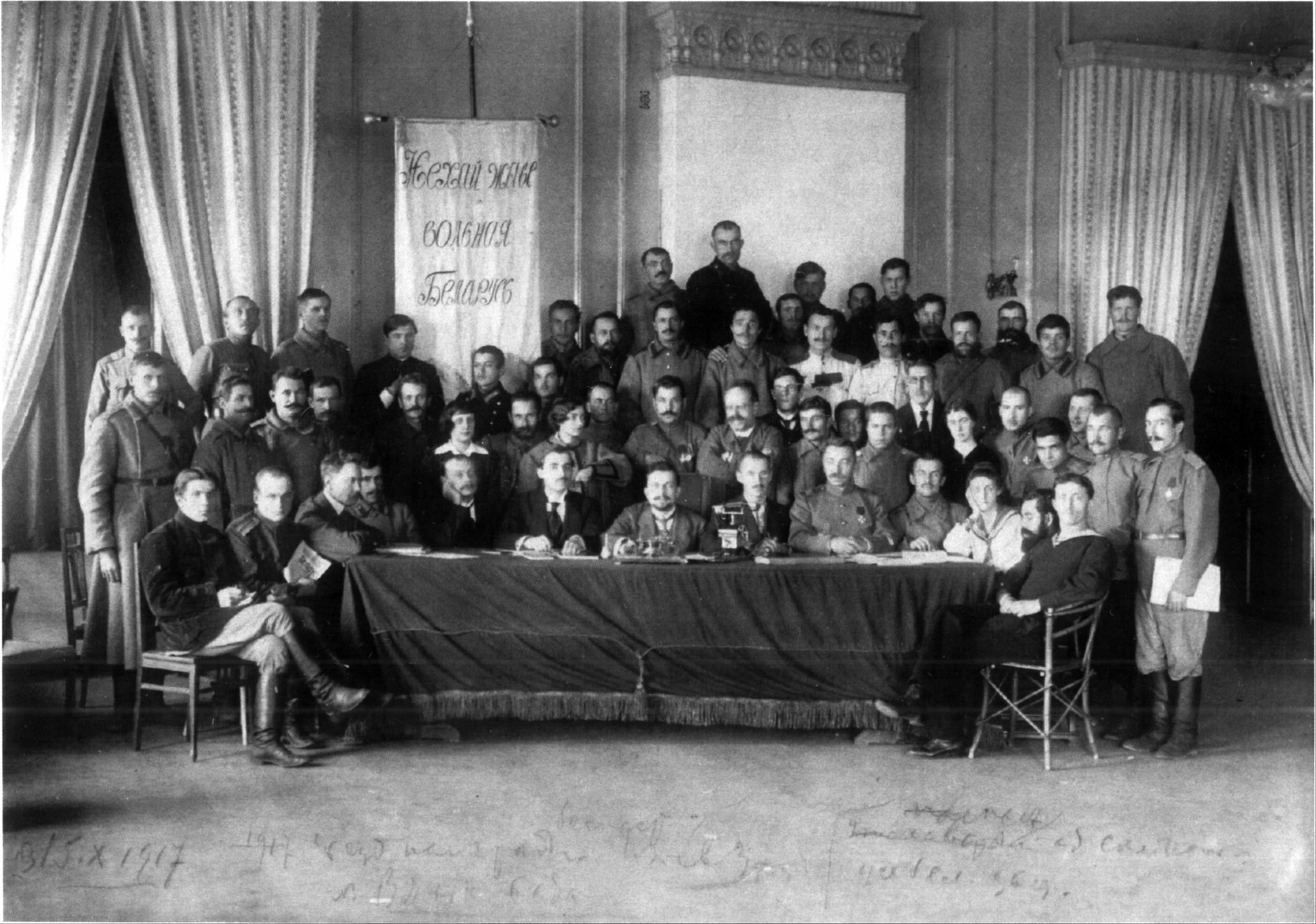
2nd session of the Central Council of Belarusian organizations October 1917, Minsk

Parallel with negotiations that started between the Germans and Bolsheviks, the Belarusian Council started actively demanding recognition of autonomous status for Belarus, with continuing internal discussions on whether it should become an autonomous region within Russia or declare national independence.

On 21 February 1918, the German army captured Minsk. On the same day, the Belarusian Council passed the First Constituent Charter declaring the council the only legitimate power on the territory of Belarus. Neither the occupying authorities, nor its government in Berlin, however, were interested in the idea of an independent Belarusian state.

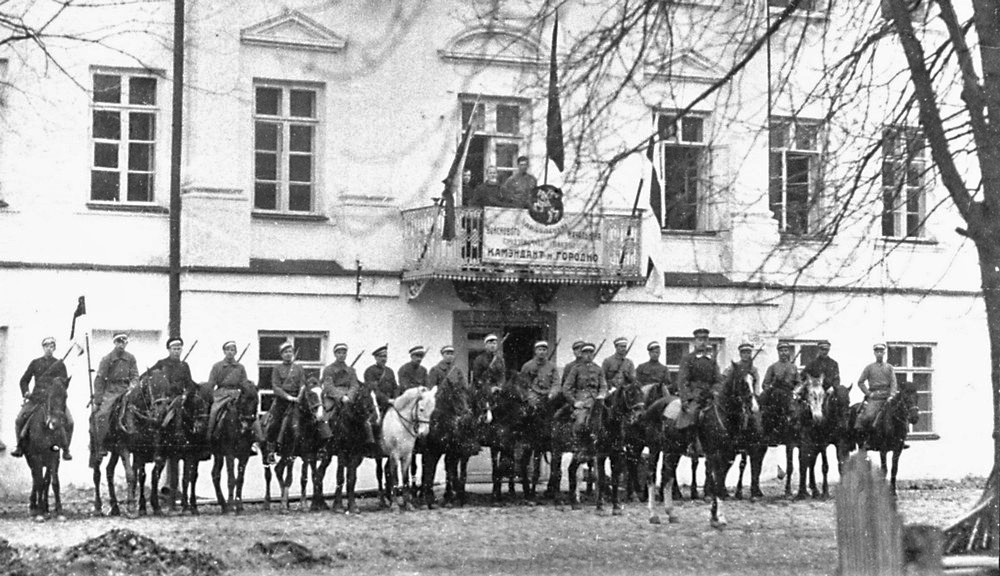
The Government of the BNR in Hrodna(Grodno)

On 3 March, Germans and Bolsheviks signed the Treaty of Brest-Litovsk. On 6 March, the Belarusian Council passed the Second Charter declared the establishment of the Belarusian People's Republic. The Council became the provisional government of Belarus and was renamed the Council of the Belarusian People's Republic and the city of Minsk was established as the capital of the new state.

Following the adoption of the Third Constituent Charter On March 25, 1918, tthe All-Belarusian Congress proclaimed the independence of the Belarusian People's Republic.

Germany did not recognize the Belarusian People's Republic (BNR), but it did not hinder the republic's figures in their educational and cultural activities.

As the German army retreated and the Bolsheviks pushed westward, the Government of the BNR left Minsk in December 1918 for the Lithuanian Republic, and in the spring of 1919 went into exile.

=== Territory ===
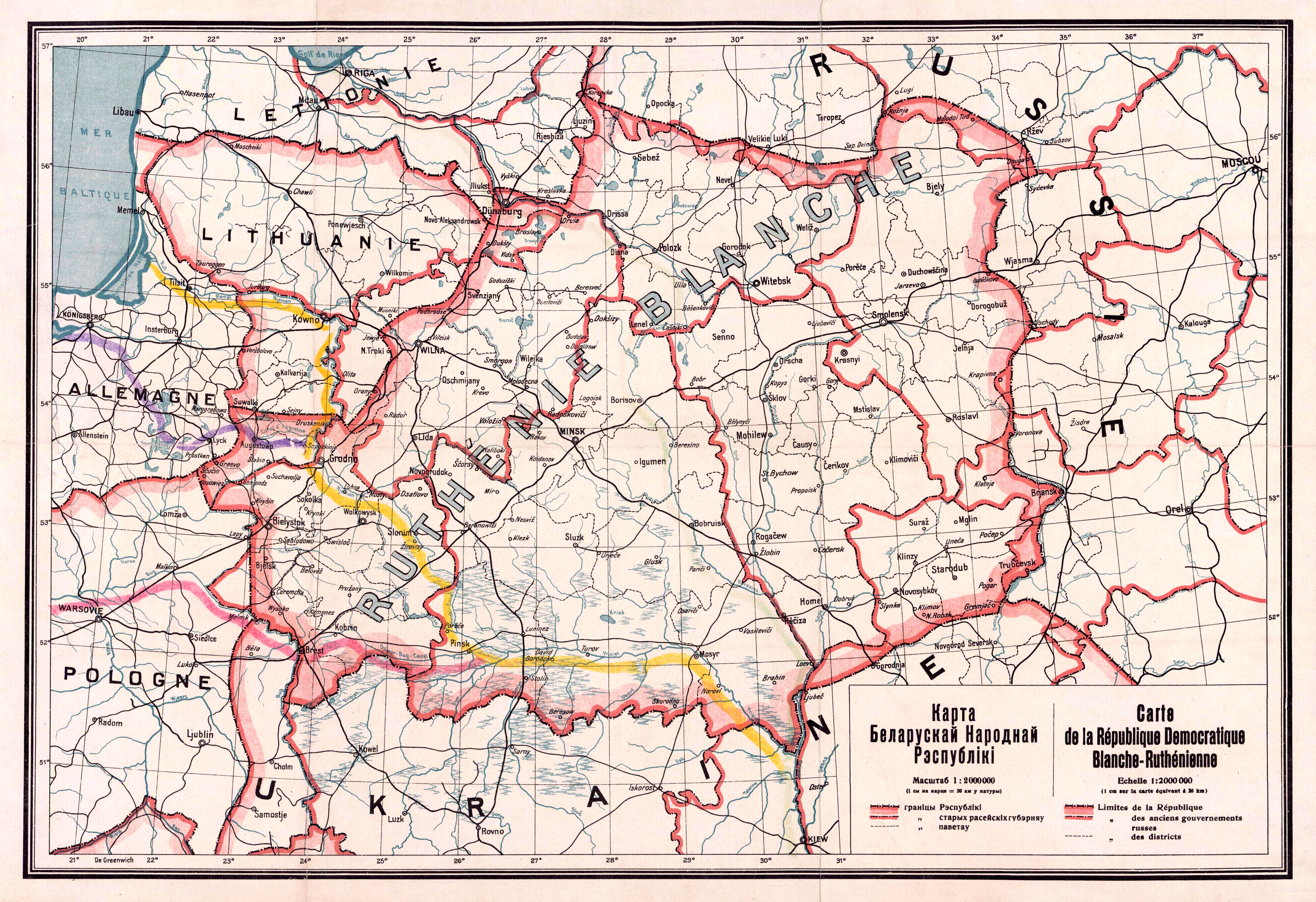
1918 map of the "White Ruthenian Democratic Republic" in French

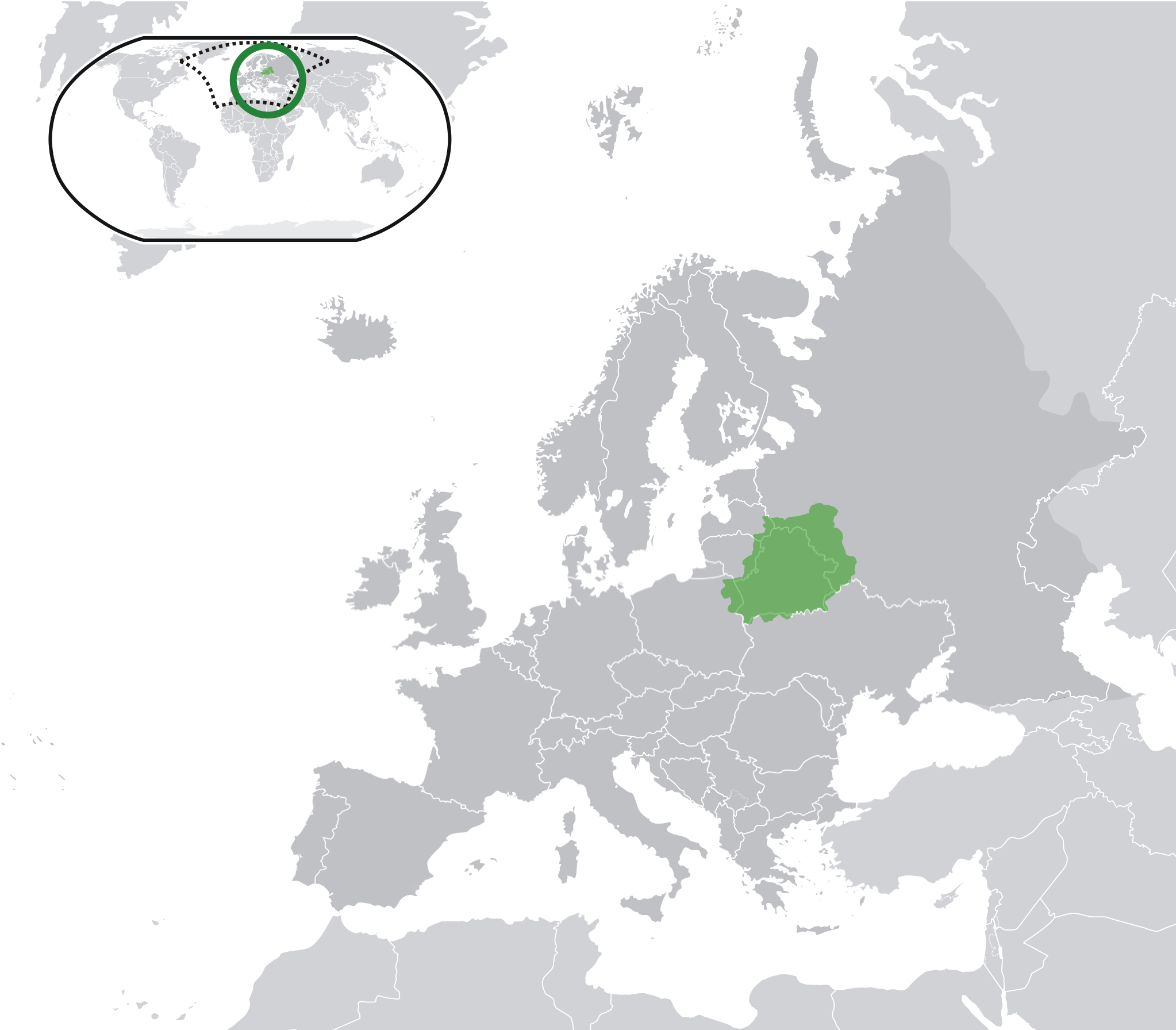
Claimed territories superimposed on modern borders

In its Third Constituent Charter, the following territories were claimed for BNR: Mogilev Governorate (province), as well as Belarusian parts of Minsk Governorate, Grodno Governorate (including Belastok), Vilna Governorate, Vitebsk Governorate, and Smolensk Governorate, and parts of bordering governorates populated by Belarusians, rejecting the then split of the Belarusian lands between Germany and Russia. The areas were claimed because of a Belarusian majority or large minority (as in Grodno and Vilna Governorate), although there were also numbers of Lithuanians, Poles and people speaking mixed varieties of Belarusian, Lithuanian and Polish, as well as many Jews, mostly in towns and cities (in some towns they made up a majority). Some of the Jews spoke Russian as their native tongue; others spoke Yiddish.

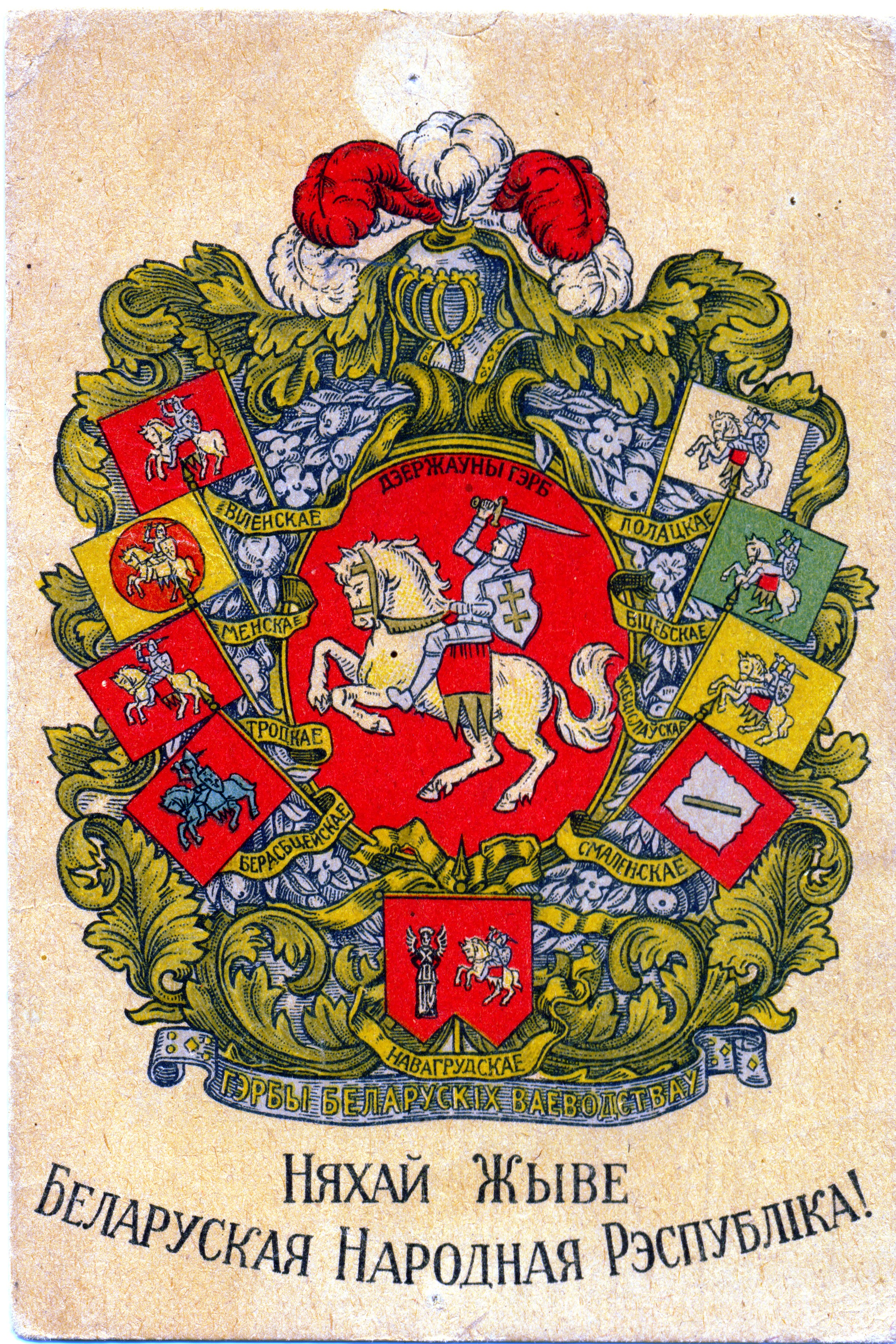
Belarusian People's Republic postcard with coats of arms of voivodeships

According to the Third Constituent Charter of the Rada of the Belarusian People's Republic, the territory of the Belarusian People's Republic encompassed the scientifically defined ethnic territory of the Belarusian people:

«The Belarusian People's Republic shall encompass all lands where the Belarusian people live and constitute a numerical majority, namely: the Mogilev region, the Belarusian parts of the Minsk, Grodno (including Grodno, Białystok, etc.), Vilna, Vitebsk, Smolensk, and Chernigov regions, as well as adjacent areas of neighboring governorates inhabited by Belarusians.» — 3rd Constituent Charter of the Rada of the Belarusian People's Republic

Also, on a BNR postcard featuring the Pahonia coat of arms, the Belarusian voivodeships (corresponding to the voivodeships of the Grand Duchy of Lithuania).

=== Military ===
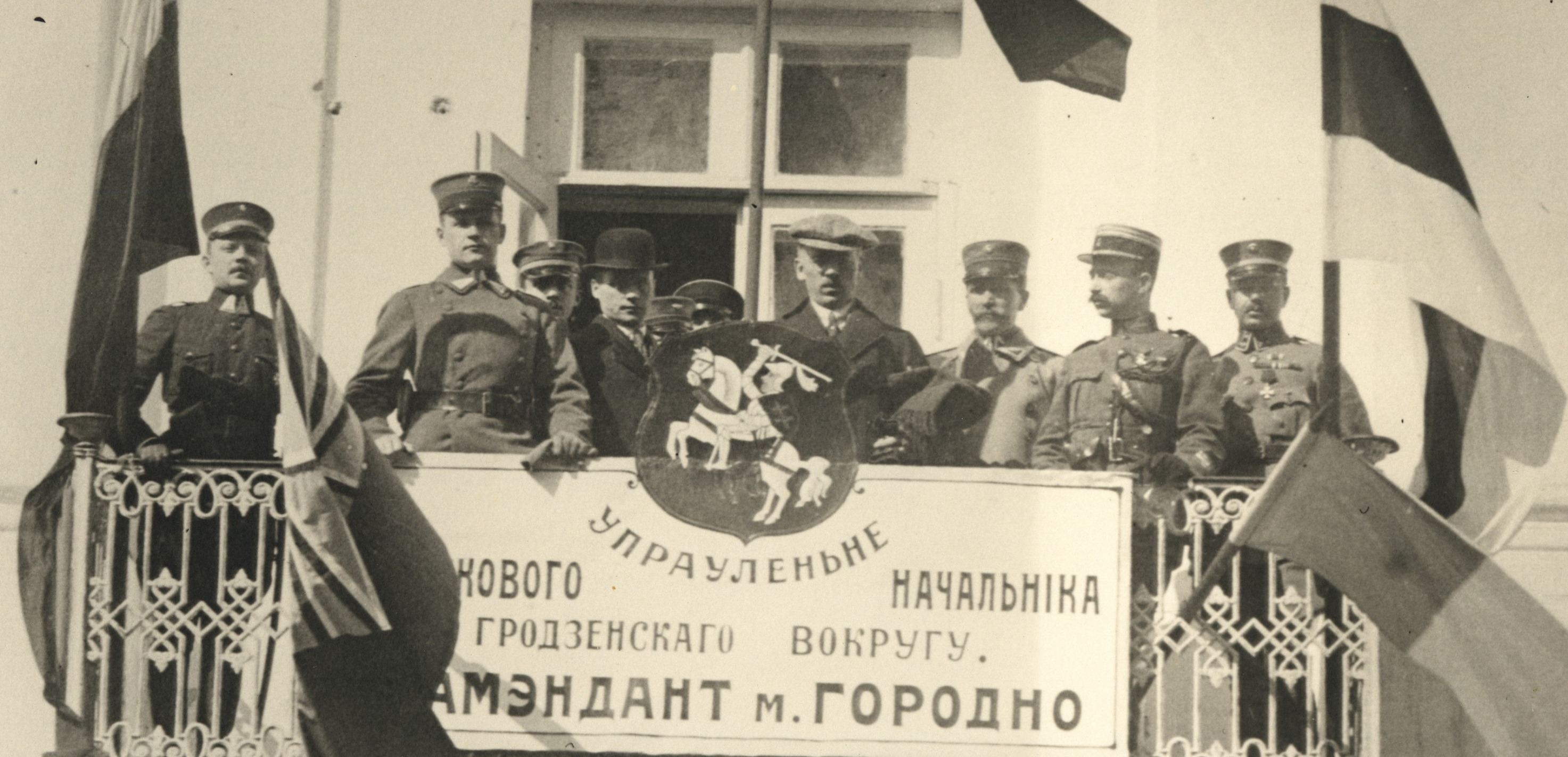
Members of the 1st Belarusian Regiment of the Lithuanian Armed Forces in a balcony. Kastus Yezavitov is standing on the balcony.

There were attempts to create the armed forces of the newly established Belarusian People's Republic. Belarusian military units started to form within the disorganized Imperial Russian Army already in 1917.

In February 1918, when the Executive Committee of the All-Belarusian Congress assumed power in Minsk, the First Minsk Belarusian Regiment was established; it remained in existence until the arrival of German troops.

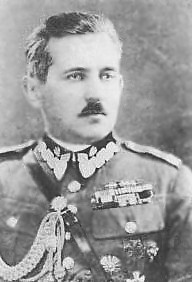
President and General Stanisław Bułak-Bałachowicz in a Polish general's uniform

Under German supervision, the leaders of the Belarusian People's Republic (BNR) engaged in state-building activities across nearly all sectors, with the exception of the military. The BNR government was not permitted to maintain its own army or police force. Germany blocked the redeployment of a 100,000-strong Belarusian force from the Romanian Front to Belarus. Disillusionment with the Germans prompted Belarusian Socialist Revolutionaries (SRs) to organize peasant partisan detachments to fight against the occupiers. To this end, an organization called the "Union of the Belarusian Working Peasantry" was established. Tens of thousands of people joined these partisan units—including those fighting for the state independence of the BNR. Other forms of resistance also existed. However, achieving full state independence without an army of one's own was not a realistic prospect. Germany deliberately held back the formation of Belarusian military units until the very end, fearing that they would be directed against the Bolshevik regime in Soviet Russia, which it supported.

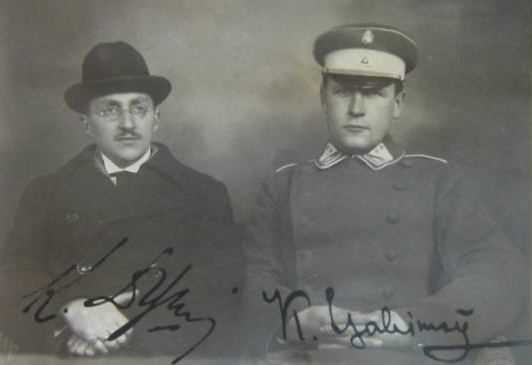
Klawdziy Duzh-Dushewski and Kastuś Jezavitaŭ, Riga 1919

According to the historian Oleg Łatyszonek, about 11,000 people, mostly volunteers, served in the Army of the Belarusian People's Republic.

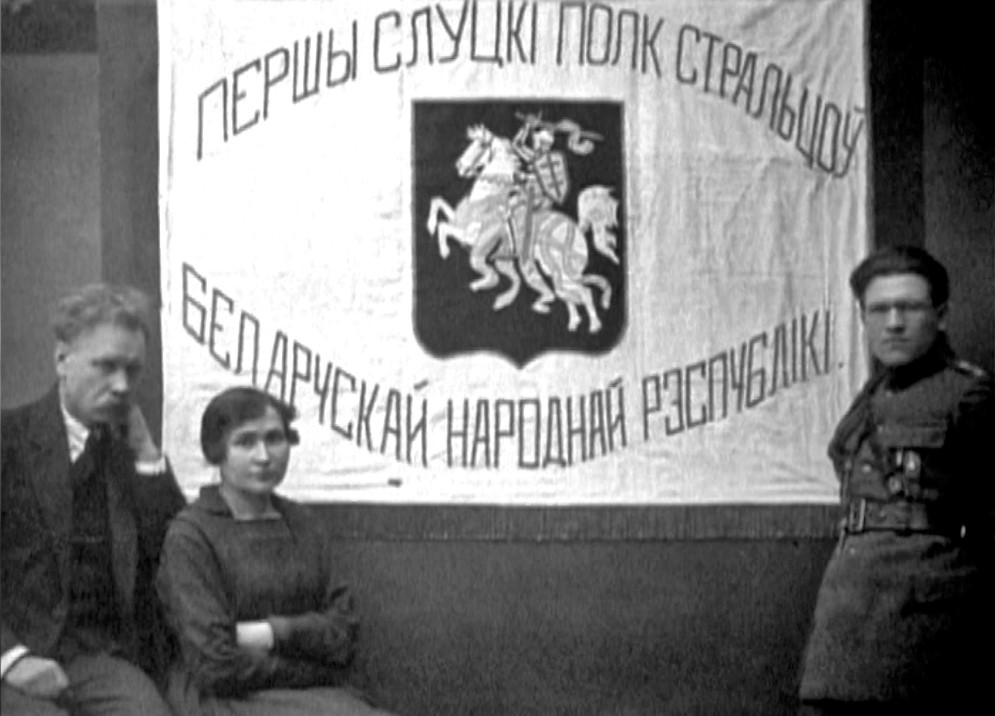
Flag of the Slutsk insurgents, from the time of the uprising

in late 1919 — early 1920 General Stanisław Bułak-Bałachowicz supported the Government of the People's Republic (recommended by Kastuś Jezavitaŭ) and openly positioned his army as a Belarusian national army ("Asobny atrad BNR"). In 1920, his units became a part of the Russian People's Volunteer Army led by the Russian SR revolutionary Boris Savinkov which established the short-lived Belarusian State during its actions against the Red Army.

The major military action of the Army of the People's Republic was the failed Slutsk defence action in late 1920. The Council of the BNR, based at that time in Lithuania, sent officers to help organize armed anti-Bolshevik resistance in the town of Slutsk. These events served as the basis for Vasil Bykau's story and the film based on it, On Black Slash-and-Burn Fields.

=== Foreign relations ===
During its short existence, the government of Belarus established close ties with the Ukrainian People's Republic, organized food supplies to Belarus from Ukraine and thereby prevented hunger in the country.

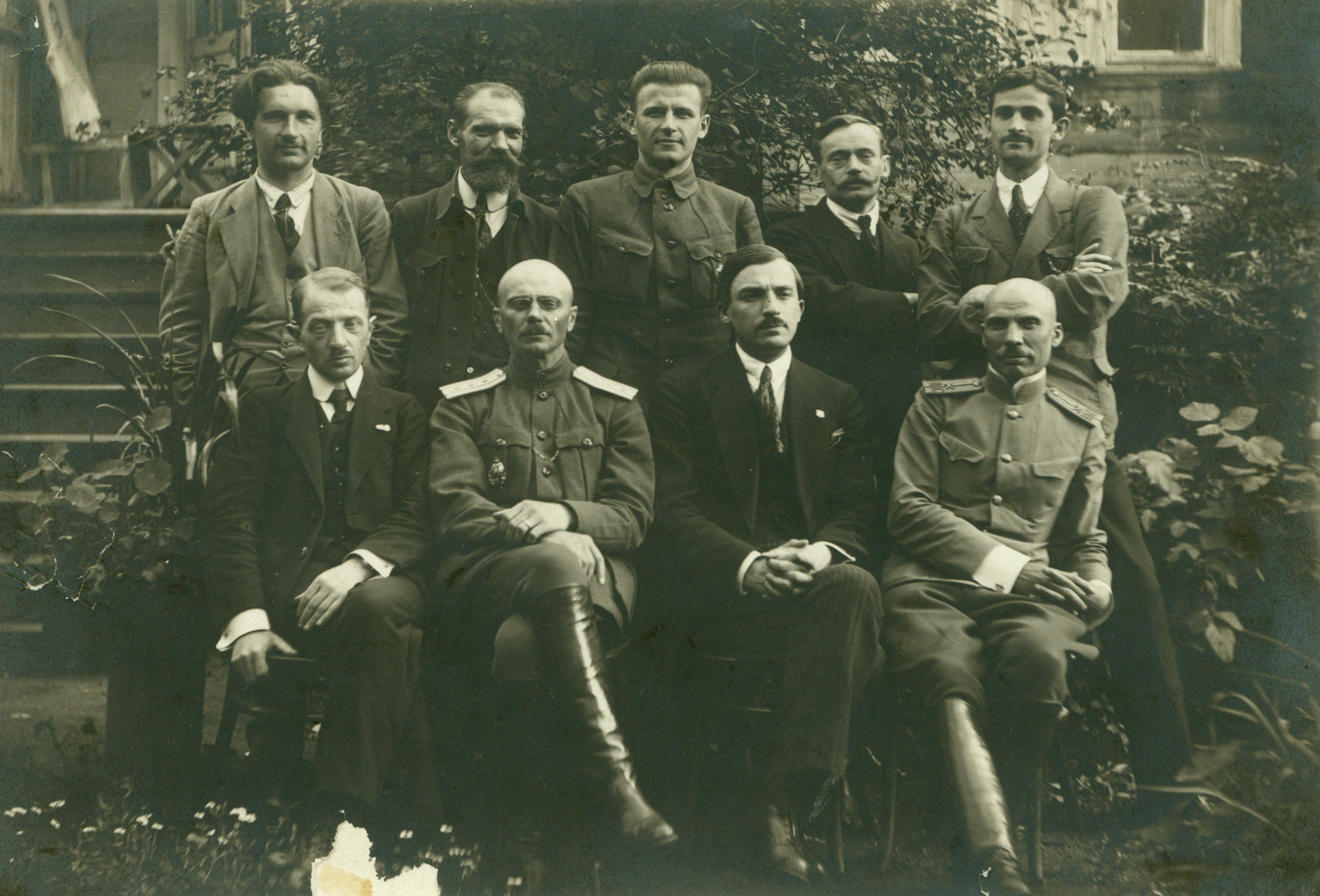
The first government of the People's Republic. Sitting, left to right: Aliaksandar Burbis, Jan Sierada, Jazep Varonka, Vasil Zacharka. Standing, left to right: Arkadź Smolič, Pyotra Krecheuski, Kastuś Jezavitaŭ, Antoni Owsianik, Leanard Zajac.

Beginning in 1918, Anton Łuckievič, the prime minister of Belarus, met with Vladimir Lenin hoping to gain recognition for the independence of Belarus by Soviet Russia. The Belarusian delegation even proposed the creation of a federation with the RSFSR and the adoption of the Soviet Constitution in Belarus in exchange for Russia recognizing the independent status of Belarus, but Lenin did not agree to these proposals.

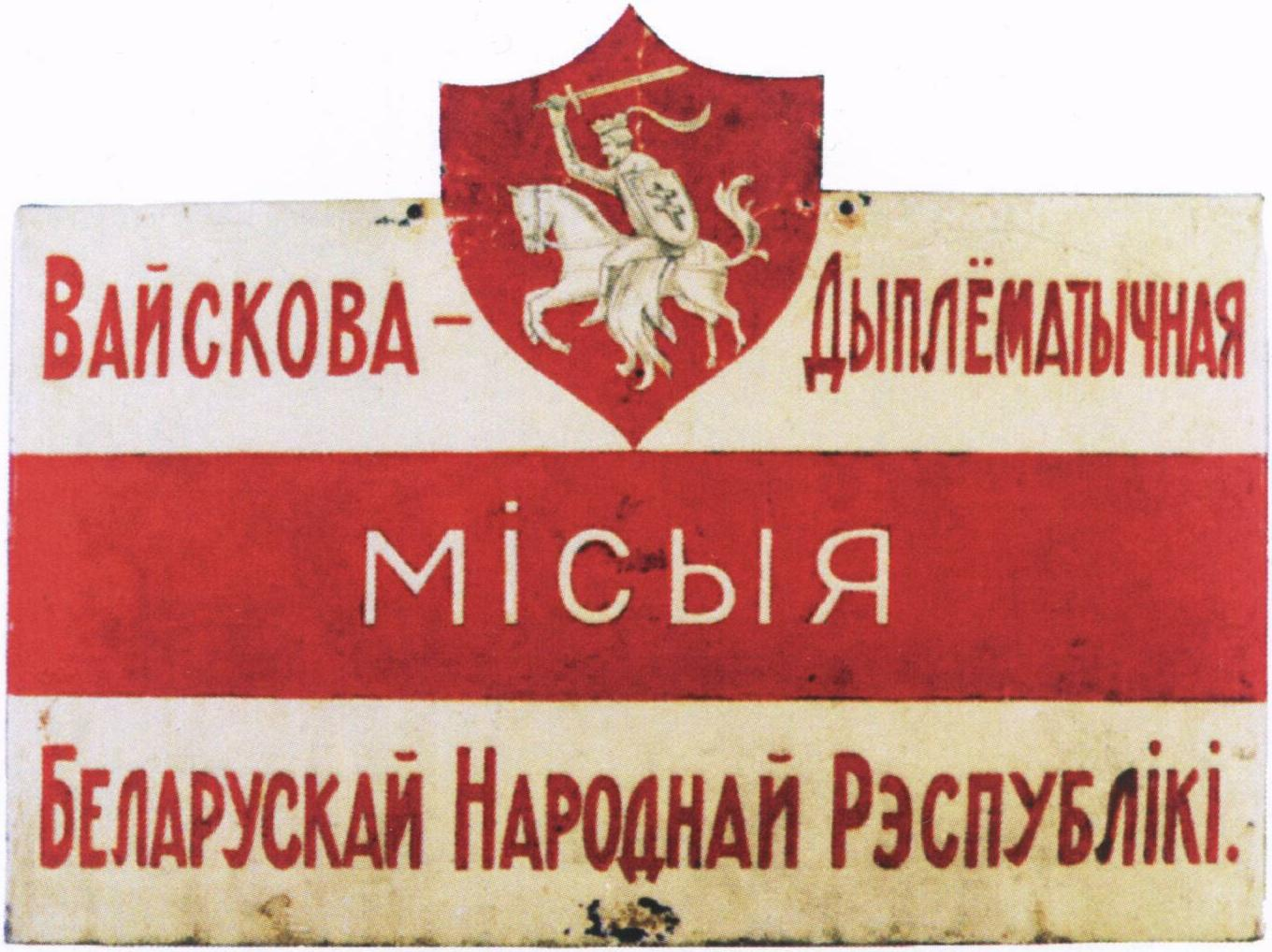
Military and Diplomatic Mission of the Belarusian Democratic Republic in Riga

In 1919, a delegation of the Belarusian People's Republic under Prime Minister Anton Łuckievič participated in the Paris Peace Conference, attempting to gain international recognition of the independence of Belarus. On the way to the conference, the delegation was received by Czechoslovak president Tomáš Masaryk in Prague. During the conference, Łuckievič had meetings with the exiled foreign minister of Admiral Kolchak's Russian government Sergey Sazonov and the prime minister of Poland Ignacy Jan Paderewski.

In October 1919 the Belarusian People's Republic was officially recognized by Estonia and in December 1919 by Finland. On November 11, 1920, the Belarusian People's Republic signed a treaty with the government of Lithuania in which both states declared to recognize each other and to cooperate together.

=== Other actions ===
The government also managed to create between 150 and 350 schools and preparations for the creation of a university in Minsk were initiated.

== Education, Science, Culture ==
The government of the BNR achieved its greatest successes in the realm of cultural development and the advancement of education. Within a short period, estimates suggest that between 150 and 350 Belarusian schools were opened, including secondary schools in Budslau, Minsk, Navahrudak, Slutsk, and Hrodna.

Anton Łuckievič

State Theater of the BNR (1918)

Teacher training took place at the Svislach secondary school as well as the Minsk Pedagogical Institute. Preparations were also underway for the opening of the Belarusian State University (an initiative led by Arkadź Smolič, Mitrafan Dounar-Zapolski, Yefim Karsky, Usevalad Ihnatouski, and others). The BNR’s plans also included the establishment of an agricultural institute and a polytechnic institute.

In April 1918, the Minsk Higher School of Music was opened; later that same year, it was transformed into the Belarusian Conservatory. Classes also commenced at the re-established Catholic Theological Seminary (under the rectorship of Father Fabian Abrantovich, a Doctor of Philosophy).Сідарэвіч А.

In 1918, on the initiative of A. Lutskevich, the first Belarusian scientific institution—the Belarusian Scientific Society in Vilnius—was established. Preparations were also being made for the opening of the Vilnius Belarusian *gymnasium*. In 1918, 6 newspapers (including Belaruski Shlyakh) and 3 magazines were published in the Belarusian language within the Belarusian People's Republic (BNR), and 11 publishing houses were in operation. The "Adukatsya" (Education) publishing house actively produced textbooks for schools.

On May 19, 1918, the Belarusian State Theater of the BNR was established, based on the Society of Drama and Comedy.

== Exile ==
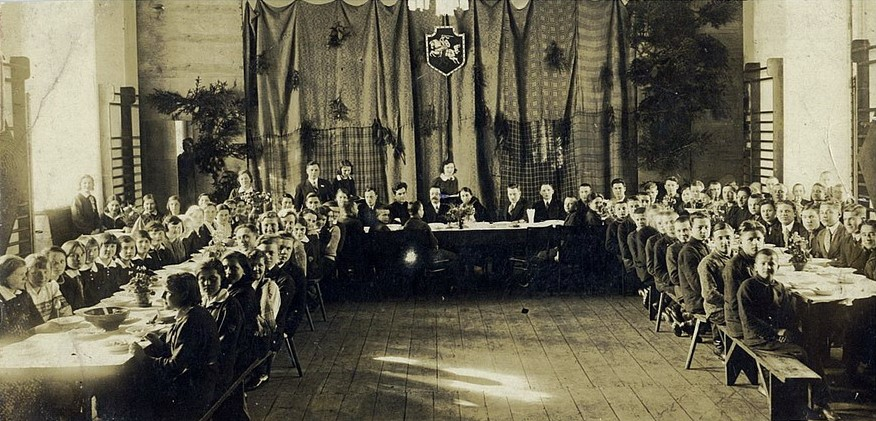
Celebration of the Independence Day of the BNR at the Belarusian Gymnasium of Vilnia in 1935

In December 1918, the German army retreated from the territory of Belarus and the Red Army moved in to establish the Socialist Soviet Republic of Byelorussia. The Rada (Council) of the BNR moved to Hrodna, the center of a semi-autonomous Belarusian region within the Republic of Lithuania. During the subsequent 1919–1920 Soviet-Polish War, the Rada went into exile and facilitated an anti-Communist struggle within the country during the 1920s.

Mission of the BNR, Berlin (1919)

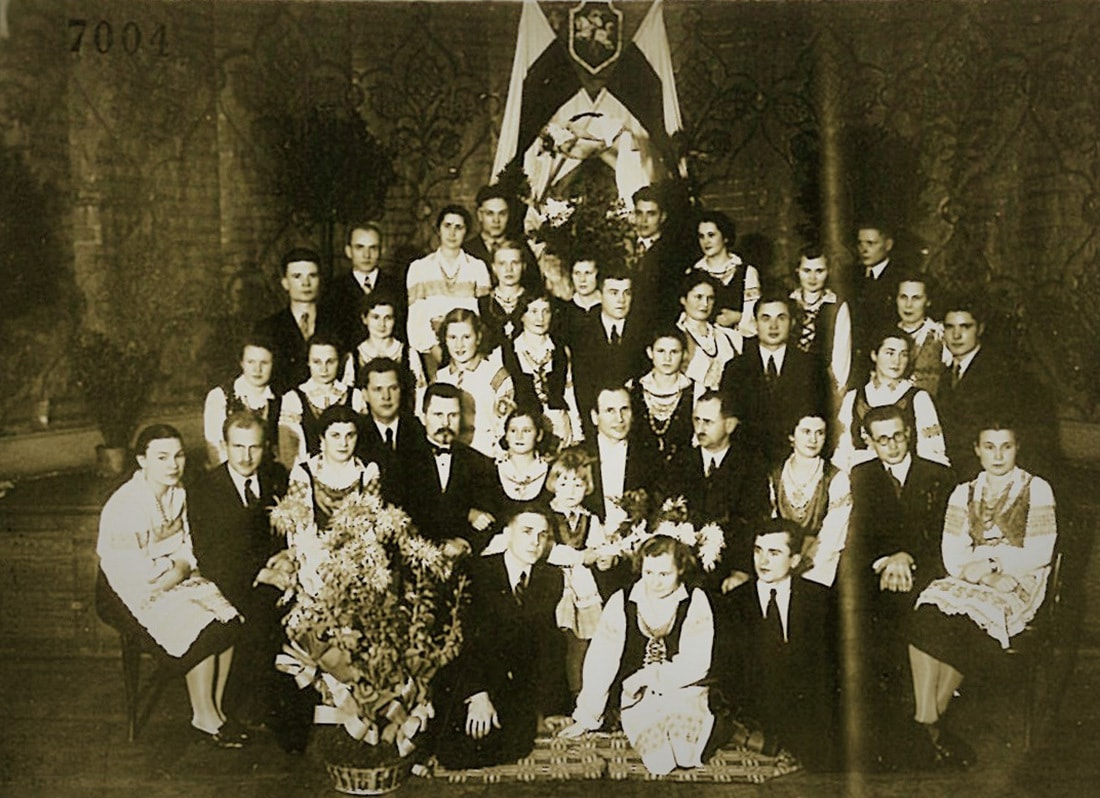
Vilnius University. choir of the Belarusian student union 1931

In 1925, the exiled Rada of the Belarusian Democratic Republic (Rada BDR) discussed relinquishing its authority in favor of the Byelorussian Soviet Socialist Republic controlling the eastern part of Belarus. Despite many members of the democratic government advocating this idea, the proposal was not approved.

From October 12 to 16, the Second All-Belarusian Conference took place in Berlin on the initiative of A.Ćvikievič; it recognized Minsk as the sole center for the revival of Belarus. Tsvikevich and the members of his government relocated to Minsk.

The Presidium of the Rada of the BNR did not recognize the conference's resolutions and remained faithful to the Act of March 25, 1918. Although Presidium members Badunova and Mamonka later moved to the BSSR, the Chairman of the Rada of the BNR, Pyotra Krecheuski, and his deputy, Vasil Zakharka, did not recognize Soviet Belarus. The state seal and the state archives of the BNR remained in their possession.

pro-German puppet government pesident Radasłaŭ Astroŭski

Following the death of P. Krecheuski, V. Zakharka, assumed his duties. After the occupation of Czechia by Nazi Germany, negotiations took place in 1939—initiated by the German side—between representatives of the Reich Ministry of Foreign Affairs and V. Zakharka. The latter rejected the Nazis' proposal for cooperation. Before his death, Zakharka handed over the seal and the state archives to Mikola Abramchyk, who served as Chairman of the Rada of the BNR until 1970.

During World War II, the Belarusian government-in-exile, based in Prague, refused to cooperate with Nazi Germany or with the Belarusian Central Rada, the pro-German puppet government and issued statements in support of the Western Allies.

After the World War II, the Belarusian Central Radal — formed by Radaslau Astrouski in 1943 and continuing to exist in exile —emerged as a rival to the government of the BNR in exile. Unlike the Belarusian Central Council, which consisted almost entirely of former Nazi collaborators, the BNR government included both former figures from the Belarusian Central Council (such as Barys Rahula, Auhien Kalubovich, Anton Adamovič, Stanislau Stankewitsch, Francišak Kušal, and Jan Stankievič) and individuals who had fought against the Nazis (Vincient Zhuk-Hryshkevich, Lavon Rydleŭski, and Piotra Sych).

The advance of the Red Army in 1945 forced the BNR's Rada to relocate to the western part of Germany, occupied by British and American troops. In February 1948, the Rada passed a special manifesto, by which it declared its return to activity. In April 1948, the Rada, together with deputies of the Belarusian post-war refugees, held a conference in Osterhofen, Bavaria.

The émigré community did not recognize the BSSR or its borders. They viewed a potential conflict between the USSR and the West— which would inevitably lead to the collapse of the communist system—as a possible means of regaining Belarusian territories that had been incorporated into the RSFSR (specifically the Smolensk region and parts of the Bryansk and Pskov regions). In appeals to Western states and the United Nations, the Rada of the BNR requested the establishment of a UN commission to investigate the Soviet Union’s colonial policy in Belarus, including the fact that the BSSR delegation falsely represented the interests of Belarus at the UN.

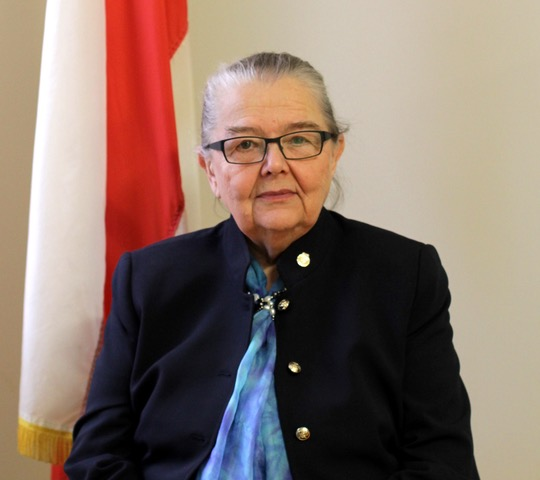
Ivonka Survilla, modern President of the Rada of the BNR.

After the dissolution of the Soviet Union in the 1990s, similar governments-in-exile of the neighboring countries (Lithuania, Poland, Ukraine, Latvia, Estonia) handed back their mandates to the corresponding independent governments.

Upon declaration of independence of the Byelorussian Soviet Socialist Republic in 1990, it was stated then that the Rada was ready to hand its status to a democratically elected parliament of Belarus. The parliament of Belarus of that time had been elected under Soviet rule. However, these plans were dropped after president Alexander Lukashenko, elected in the 1994 presidential election, established an authoritarian regime accompanied by a return to Soviet policies in regards to Belarusian language and culture.

The Rada BNR still exists as a government in exile.

Since the late 1980s, March 25, the Independence Day of the Belarusian Democratic Republic, is celebrated by the Belarusian national democratic opposition as Freedom Day (Belarusian: Дзень волі).

In the fall of 2022, a meeting took place between opposition leader Sviatlana Tsikhanouskaya and Ivonka Survilla, Chair of the Rada BNR in Ottawa .

== Symbols ==
A national flag of three stripes – white-red-white – was adopted, as well as a state seal (Pahonia) based on an emblem of the Grand Duchy of Lithuania, and the anthem "Warrior March"

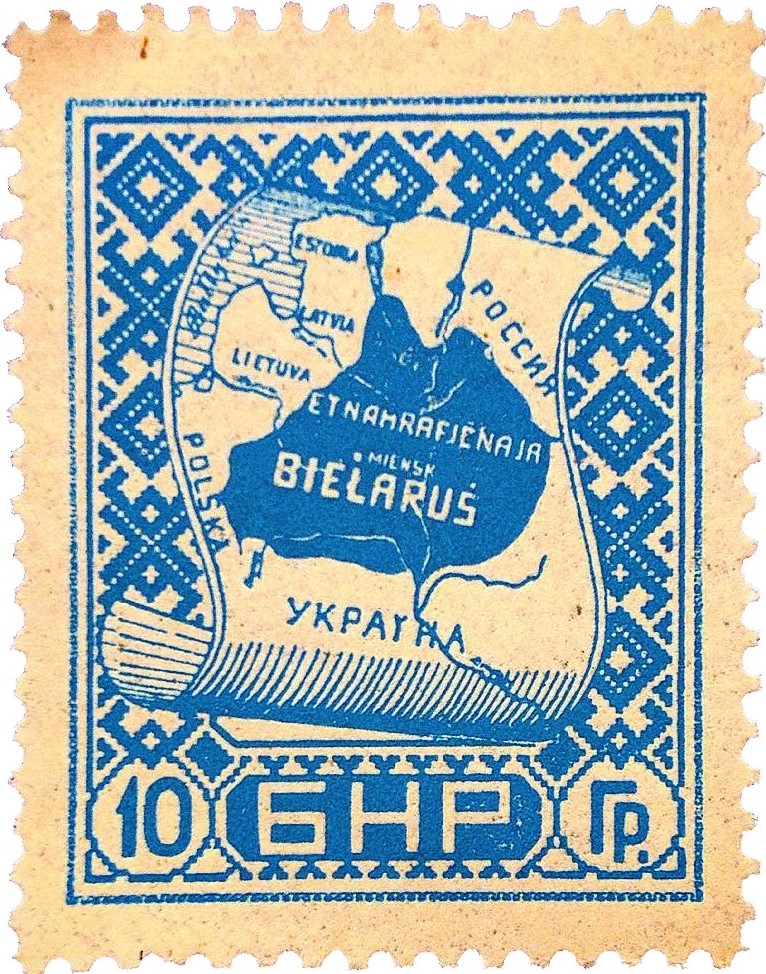
10-hrašoŭ postage stamp

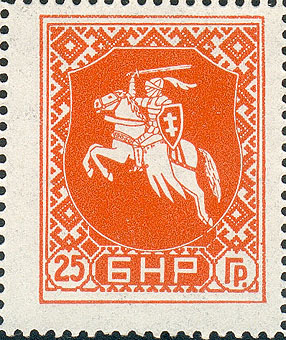
25-hrašoŭ postage stamp

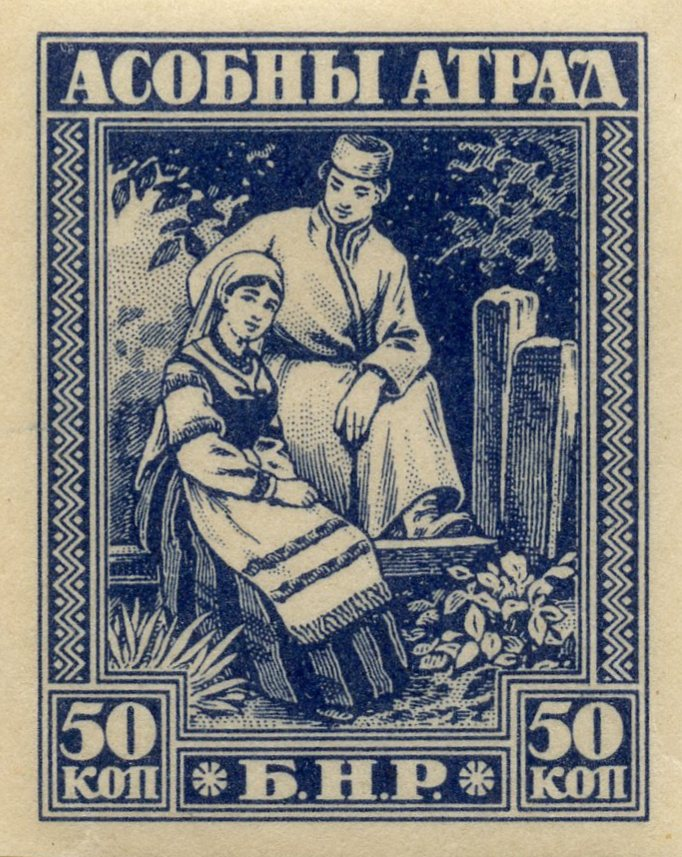
A postage stamp of the Belarusian Democratic Republic

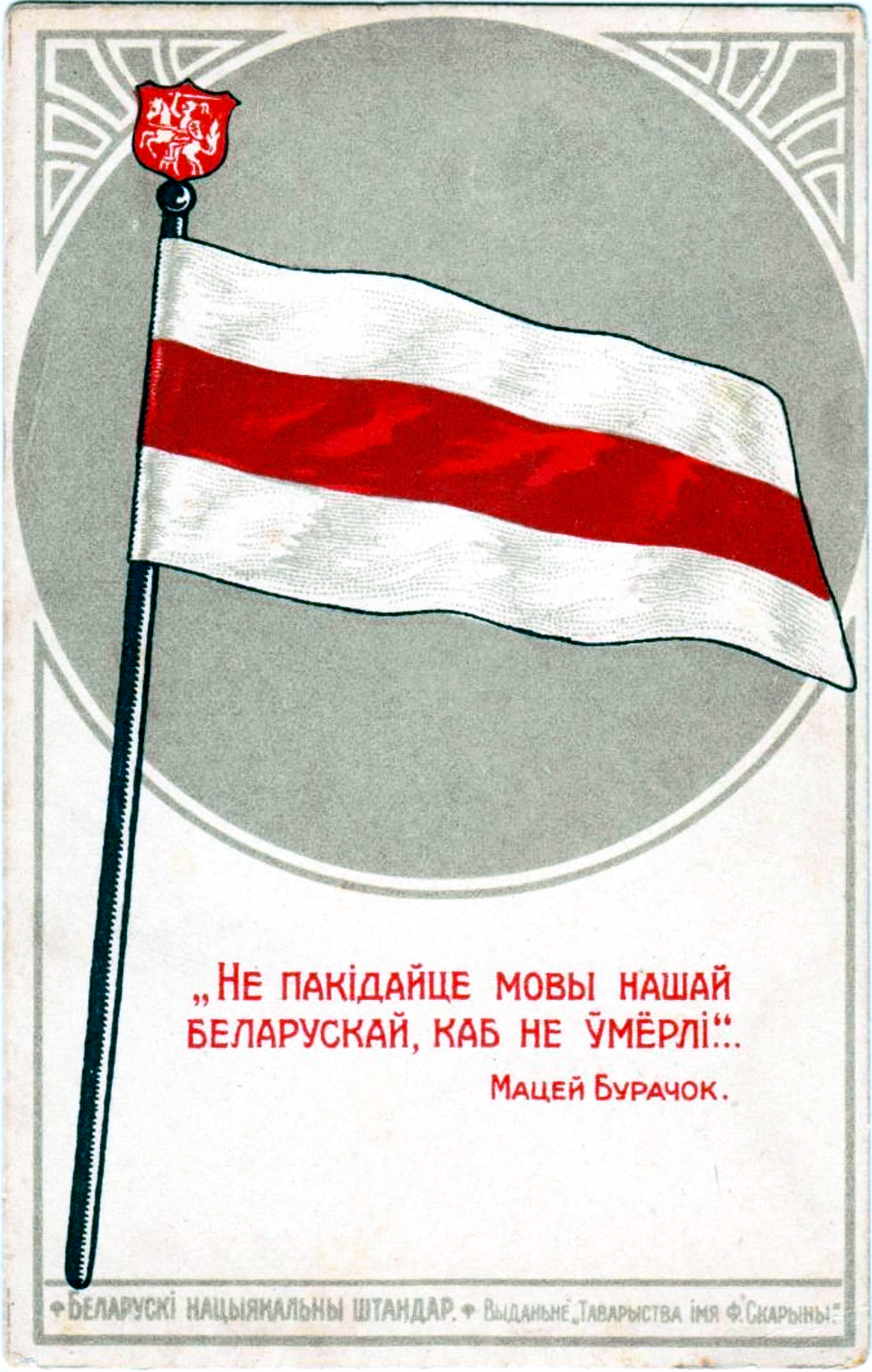
Belarusian National flag

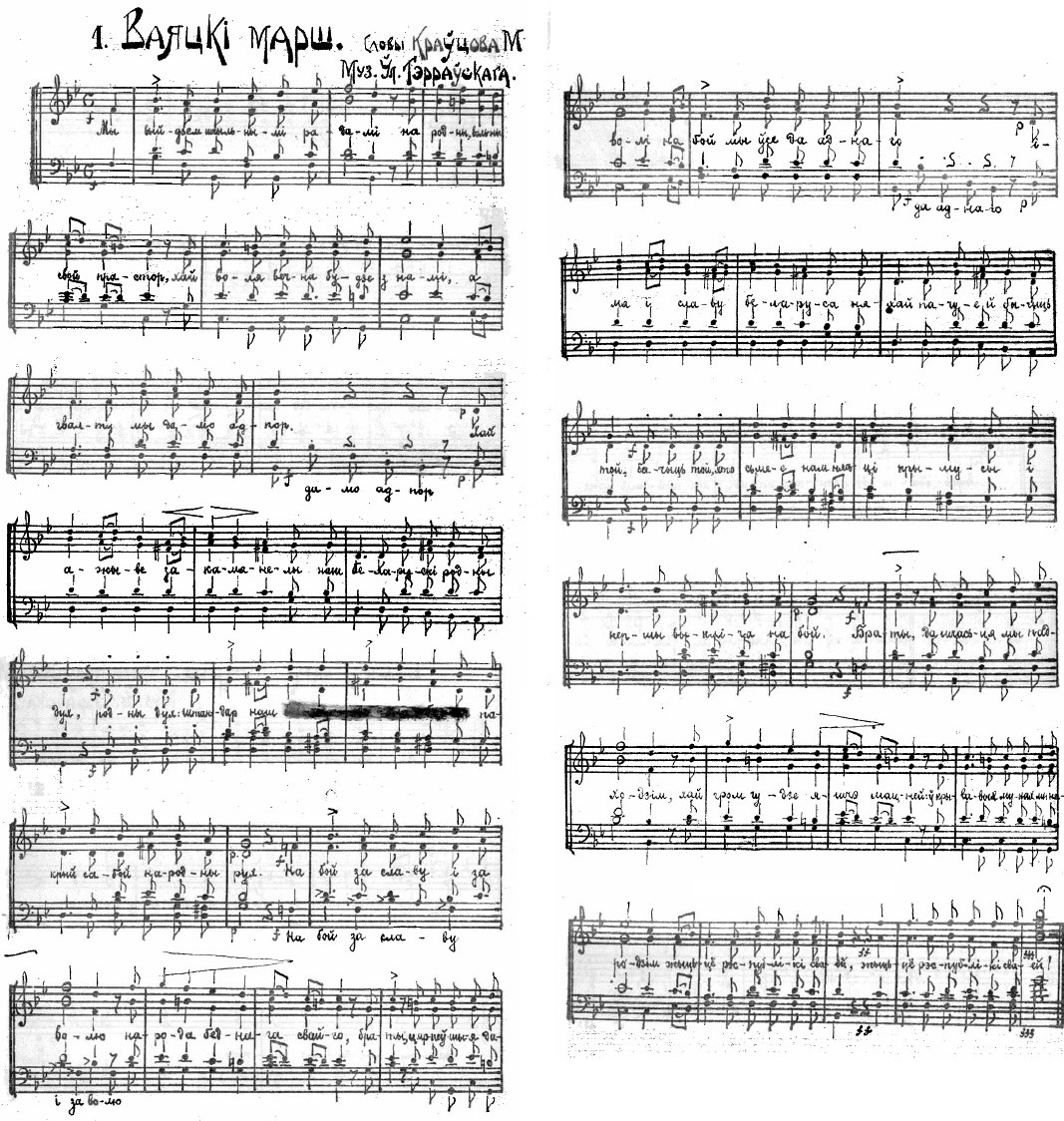
March of the Warriors, published in 1919 on the newspaper Belarus.

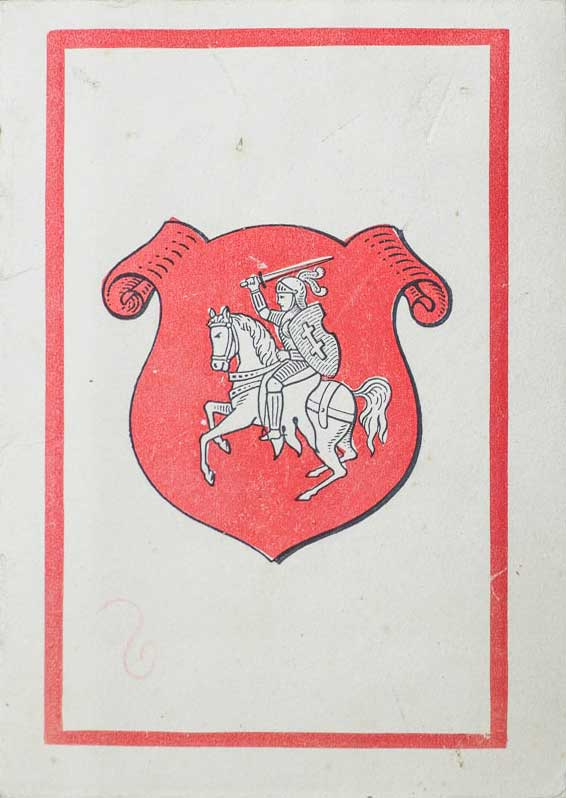
Inside cover of a BNR passport, featuring the coat of arms

passport

== Presidents ==
Chairpersons of the Council of the Belarusian People's Republic:

- Jan Sierada (1918)
- Jazep Losik (1918–1919; acting)
- Piotra Krečeŭski (1919–1928)
- Vasil Zacharka (1928–1943)
- Mikoła Abramčyk (1944–1970)
- Vincent Žuk-Hryškievič (1970–1980)
- Jazep Sažyč (1980–1997)
- Ivonka Survilla (1997–present)

== Archives ==
In 1998, Belarusian linguist and translator Siarhiej Šupa published a two-volume collection of BNR archives (Архівы Беларускай Народнай Рэспублікі. Менск-Вільня-Прага-Нью-Ёрк). The total size of the two volumes is more than 1700 pages. Essentially these are the processed and re-organized documents from the Lithuanian archival fund #582 in Vilnius and they constitute roughly 60% of all the BNR official documents from 1918. Another 20% of BNR official documentation is located in the Minsk archives, and the fate of the remaining 20% is unknown. Poet Larysa Hienijuš was one of the activists that were in charge of the BNR's archives in the Interwar era.

== See also ==
- List of states and regions involved in the Russian Civil War
- Bibliography of the Russian Revolution and Civil War
- Bibliography of the history of Belarus and Byelorussia
- Outline of the Russian Revolution and Civil War
- Freedom Day (Belarus)
- Ukrainian People's Republic
- Grand Duchy of Lithuania and Belarus
