= Stanislau Stankewitsch =

Stanislau Stankewitsch was a Belarusian politician and intellectual who became a Nazi collaborator during World War II. Under the German occupation, he was appointed mayor of the city of Barysaw, where he organized the creation of a ghetto for the city's approximately 8,000 Jews. His collaboration was crucial to the subsequent massacre. With US assistance, he emigrated to New York in 1959 and obtained citizenship in 1969. It wasn't until 1980 that the US Department of Justice initiated proceedings to deport him for his war crimes. However, Stankewitsch died in New York in November of that year, thus evading justice until the end.

== Biography ==
Stankevich studied Slavic languages and received his doctorate in humanities from Vilna University in 1936. He taught Belarusian and literature at the gymnasium in Dzizna.

=== World War II ===
At the time of the German invasion of the Soviet Union, he was teaching in the then-Soviet town of Nawarudak. Immediately after the invasion, he became a “liaison” to the advance party of the German Einsatzgruppe B under SS-Standartenführer Franz Six. In the summer of 1941, the occupying forces appointed him mayor of the town of Barysaw. Stankevich relocated the approximately 8,000 Jews living there to the poorest part of the town and had a wall built around the ghetto. On the orders of the SS, he introduced a tax on the Jews.

On October 20, 1941, units of the Belarusian Auxiliary Police, together with SS officers and soldiers, some of whom came from Latvia, murdered up to 7,000 of the 8,000 Jews living in the city on the orders of Stankevich. The night before, the mayor had held a "wild feast" for the police officers. During the mass murder, the victims had to arrange the bodies of those already shot in a space-saving manner and cover them with a thin layer of sand before they themselves were shot.[9] Stankevich also instructed his troops to shoot through two people with a single shot to save ammunition. According to his own account, Stankevich was not present during the massacre but had retreated to the countryside.[10]

He was subsequently promoted to head of the Belarusian Central Council for the entire region around Baranevichy. As he had done previously in Baryssau, Stankevich, immediately after taking over the administration of Baranevichy in the spring of 1942, interned the city's 15,000 Jews in a ghetto to prepare for their extermination.[11]

When the Red Army advanced into Belarus, Stankevich went to Germany, where, from August 1944, he published the Belarusian nationalist and anti-communist weekly newspaper Ranica ("The Morning"), which was aimed at Belarusians living in Germany and attempted to recruit them for the Waffen-SS.

=== After the war ===
After the war, Stankevich was housed in the Amberg DP camp in the American occupation zone from May 1945. He then taught displaced persons in the Regensburg and Michelsdorf DP camps. From the end of 1946 until May 1950, he ran the Osterhofen DP camp, employing authoritarian methods. At the same time, he began publishing the newspaper Bazkauschtschyna ("Fatherland"). A resolution adopted by the United Nations on October 31, 1947, at the request of the Byelorussian SSR, which labeled Stankevich a war criminal unlawfully harboring the US, had no effect.

After 1950, Stankevich taught languages at the International Refugee Organization (IRO) in Munich. A relevant committee rejected an application for emigration to the USA under the Displaced Persons Act because Stankevich had published a pro-German propaganda newspaper during the war. He was a "complete opportunist" who changed his political views and loyalties and was only concerned with his own advantage. He was therefore considered a security risk. Stankevich subsequently continued to live in the DP camp in Rosenheim and earned 600 DM per month as the publisher of his newspaper. In June 1950, he traveled as a representative of the Belarusian Central Council to the meeting of the Anti-Bolshevik Bloc of Nations in Edinburgh. There, the Central Committee of the organization, which was secretly funded by the CIA, elected him.

After his return to Germany, he became chairman of the "Institute for the Study of the USSR" in Munich, which was also funded by the CIA. He also worked for Radio Free Europe. He became vice president of the Rada of the Belarusian People's Republic, an anti-Soviet Belarusian government-in-exile led by Mikola Abramchyk. After Stankevich boasted to other Belarusian émigrés about his role in the Baryssau massacre, the contact at the Office of Policy Coordination was asked whether collaborating with a notorious war criminal was wise. However, it was argued that Stankevich was too important a source.

In 1959, Stankevich received a visa from the American Committee for the Liberation of the Peoples of Russia, which allowed him to emigrate to the United States. He settled in New York City. Frank G. Wisner's CIA unit intervened with the Immigration and Naturalization Service to obtain a re-entry permit for Stankevich, which enabled him to make repeated trips to and from Germany. Hardly any other known Nazi collaborator who had confessed to his murders enjoyed such freedom of movement. He took over the position of editor-in-chief of the newspaper "Biełarus." In March 1969, he received American citizenship. On October 30, 1969, Stankevich, as a Byelorussian representative of the Heritage Groups Division of the Republican National Committee, attended a reception in the State Dining Room of the White House. In 1980, John Loftus, a representative of the Office of Special Investigations (OSI), initiated proceedings against Stankevich that could have led to his denaturalization and deportation from the USA. However, he died on November 3, 1980, before his scheduled hearing.
