= Alaksandar Ćvikievič =

Belarusian politician (1888–1937)

- Аляксандар Цьвікевіч
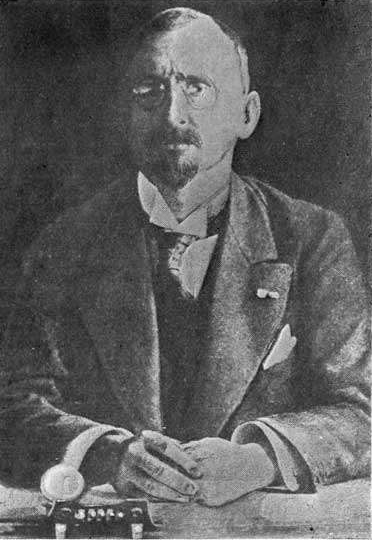
- Born: 22 June 1888; Brest-Litovsk, Brestsky Uyezd, Grodno Governorate, Lithuania Governorate-General, Russian Empire
- Died: 30 December 1937 (aged 49); Minsk, Byelorussian SSR, Soviet Union
- Cause of death: Executed
- Education: St. Petersburg University
- Occupations: Belarusian politician, historian, jurist, philosopher
- Known for: Prime-Minister of Belarus (1923-1925)

Alaksandar Ćvikievič (also spelled as Alyaksandr Tsvikyevich, Belarusian: Аляксандар (Іванавіч) Цьвікевіч, Polish: Alaksandr Ćwikiewicz; 22 June 1888 – 30 December 1937) was a Belarusian politician, historian, jurist, philosopher, and a victim of Stalin's purges. He served as Prime Minister of Belarus in exile for two years, from 23 August 1923, until October 1925. His interest featured philosophy and history. He worked as a jurist and lawyer. He was also a professor at the National Academy of Sciences of Belarus.

== Early years ==
Ćvikievič was born in June 1888 in Brest, Belarus into the family of a paramedic at a local hospital. He received his primary education in Brest.

In 1912 he graduated from the Faculty of Law of St. Petersburg University and for several years worked as a juror in Pruzhany and Brest. After the outbreak of the First World War, he was evacuated to Tula in Russia, where he was actively involved in the work of a committee for aid to war victims.

== Involvement in the Belarusian national movement and exile ==
In 1917, Ćvikievič became one of the founders of a Belarusian society in Moscow and later that year participated in the First All-Belarusian Congress. In January 1918, the executive committee of the Congress sent him and Symon Rak-Michajłoŭski to Brest for peace talks. However, they could not secure admission to participate in the talks as a separate Belarusian delegation (admission was blocked by Leon Trotsky) and instead joined a delegation from the Ukrainian People's Republic as advisers.

In March 1918, he was sent to Kiev as part of a diplomatic mission, during which Ćvikievič resolved open issues of the Belarusian-Ukrainian border, sought recognition of the Belarusian statehood and revision of the Brest Peace, and approached diplomatic missions of other countries for financial assistance to the Rada of the Belarusian Democratic Republic. He was also actively involved in the publication of the Belarusian newspaper "Belarusian Echo" in Kyiv and the establishment of a Belarusian chamber of commerce in that city. In May 1918, the Belarusian mission addressed a Russian peace delegation and handed over a note signed by Ćvikievič and Mitrofan Dovnar-Zapolsky to the delegation's head Rakovsky, urging the Russian Soviet government to recognise the independence of Belarus. In the spring of 1919, the Rada of the Belarusian Democratic Republic sent Ćvikievič on a diplomatic mission to Berlin and then to Vienna.

From 1921 to 1923, he held the post of Minister of Foreign Affairs in the Rada of the Belarusian Democratic Republic in exile and chaired the First All-Belarusian Conference in Prague in September 1921. In 1923, he replaced Vaclaŭ Lastoŭski, as new head of the Rada of the Belarusian Democratic Republic and was based in Kaunas.

== Return to Soviet Belarus and persecution ==
At the Second All-Belarusian Conference in Berlin in 1925, influenced by the successes and achievements of the policy of Belarusianisation in the BSSR, Ćvikievič decided to recognise Minsk as the only centre of the Belarusian national revival. He resigned as Prime Minister in exile and returned to Soviet Belarus. He worked in the People's Commissariat of Finance and as a scientific secretary at the Institute of Belarusian Culture, predecessor of the Academy of Sciences.

In July 1930, he was arrested and charged in the Case of the Union of Liberation of Belarus and in April 1931 sentenced to 5 years in exile in Russia. He was exiled first to Perm and then to Ishim and to Sarapul. In 1935, the term of exile was extended by further 2 years. In December 1937, he was re-arrested and sentenced to death.

== Execution and posthumous exoneration ==
Ćvikievič was executed in Minsk on 30 December 1937. He was posthumously exonerated from all charges during Gorbachev's Perestroika.

== Notable publications ==
Ćvikievič authored 6 monographs and brochures, as well as numerous articles, essays, and publications in the Belarusian press during his lifetime. He explored the issues of the Belarusian national revival, the formation of socio-political thought in Belarus and the formation and development of Belarusian statehood and Belarusian national identity. He is considered "one of the outstanding Belarusian historians".

Ćvikievič's most important historical works have been dedicated to studying the idea of West Russianism, which he described as an instrument of cultural assimilation of Belarusians. In his primary monograph, "Westrussianism: Essays on the History of Public Thought in Belarus in the XIX and early XX centuries" (Belarusian: Западно-руссизм: Нарысы з гісторыі грамадзкай мысьлі на Беларусі ў XIX і пачатку XX в.; Minsk, 1929), he analysed the ideology and practice of Russification of Belarus during the Russian Empire. The monograph was banned almost immediately after its publication and almost all its circulation was destroyed.

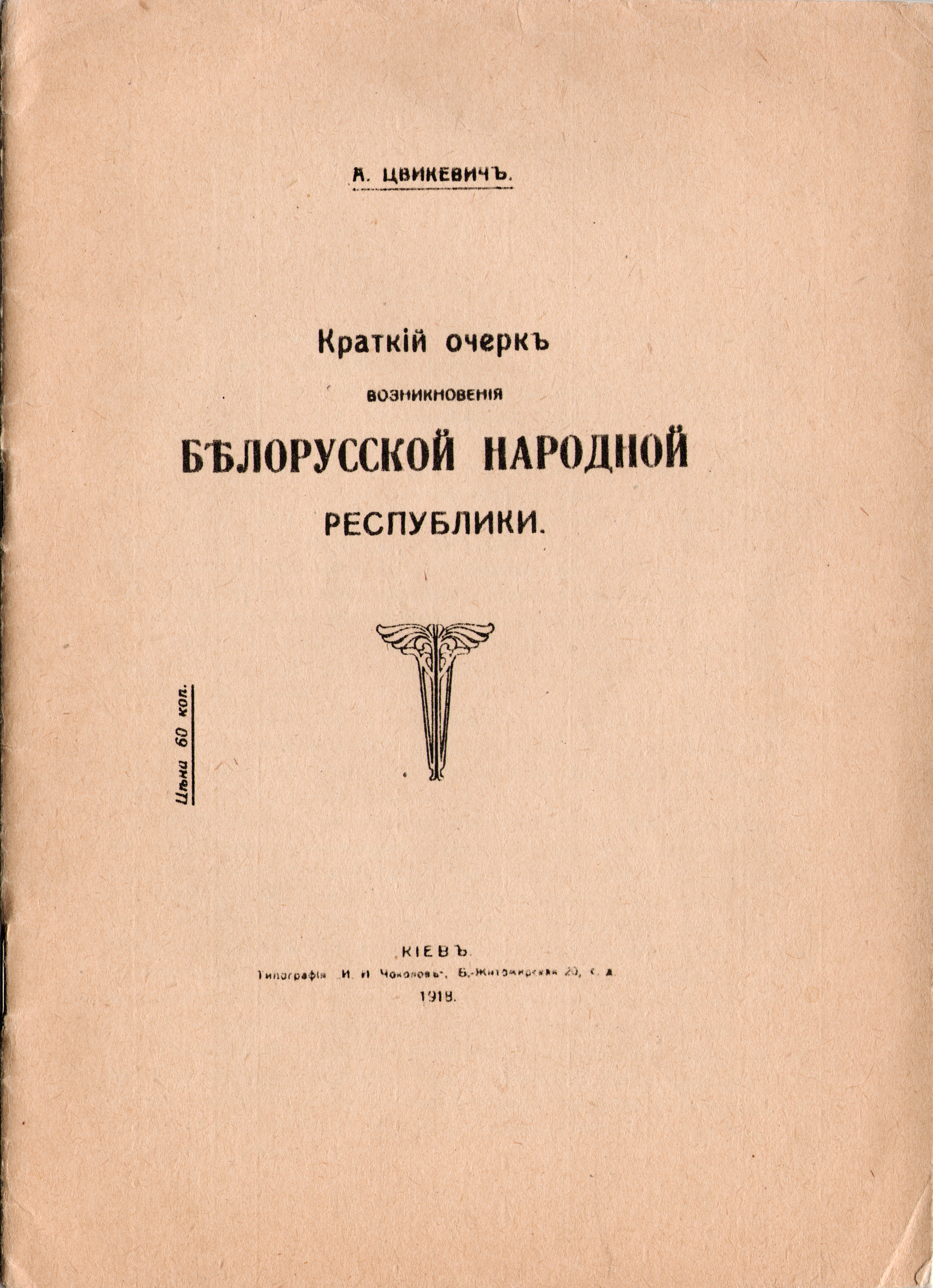
A Short Essay on the Origin of the Belarusian Democratic Republic, Kyiv,1918

Some other notable publications are:

- "Korotkii ocherk vozniknoveniia Belorusskoi Narodnoi Respubliki" ("A Short Essay on the Origin of the Belarusian Democratic Republic"; Kiev 1918) in which Ćvikievič gave a brief account of the history of the last stages of the Belarusian national movement and justified the struggle of the Belarusian people for statehood;
- "Беларусь: палітычны нарыс" ("Belarus: a political essay"; Berlin, 1919);
- "Вялікае апрашчэньне ці вялікае ўдасканаленьне?" ("Great simplification or great improvement?"; Riga, 1926);
- "Адраджэньне Беларусі і Польшча" ("Revival of Belarus and Poland"; 1921).

In March 2026, a Belarusian court added a volume of historical works by Alaksandar Ćvikievič to the list of extremist materials.

== Notable quotes ==
- "The Belarusian national revival should be understood as an evolutionary, cultural process, which until now has been suppressed by violent measures of the [Russian] police state and which now, under the conditions of free democratic statehood, must develop naturally and eventually lead to independent Belarusian culture. This process will take time as it is dependent on the maturity of intellectual forces within our country, which cannot be created by an administrative order of the state authorities."
