= Jazep Losik =

Belarusian independence activist (1884–1940)

- Язэп Лёсік
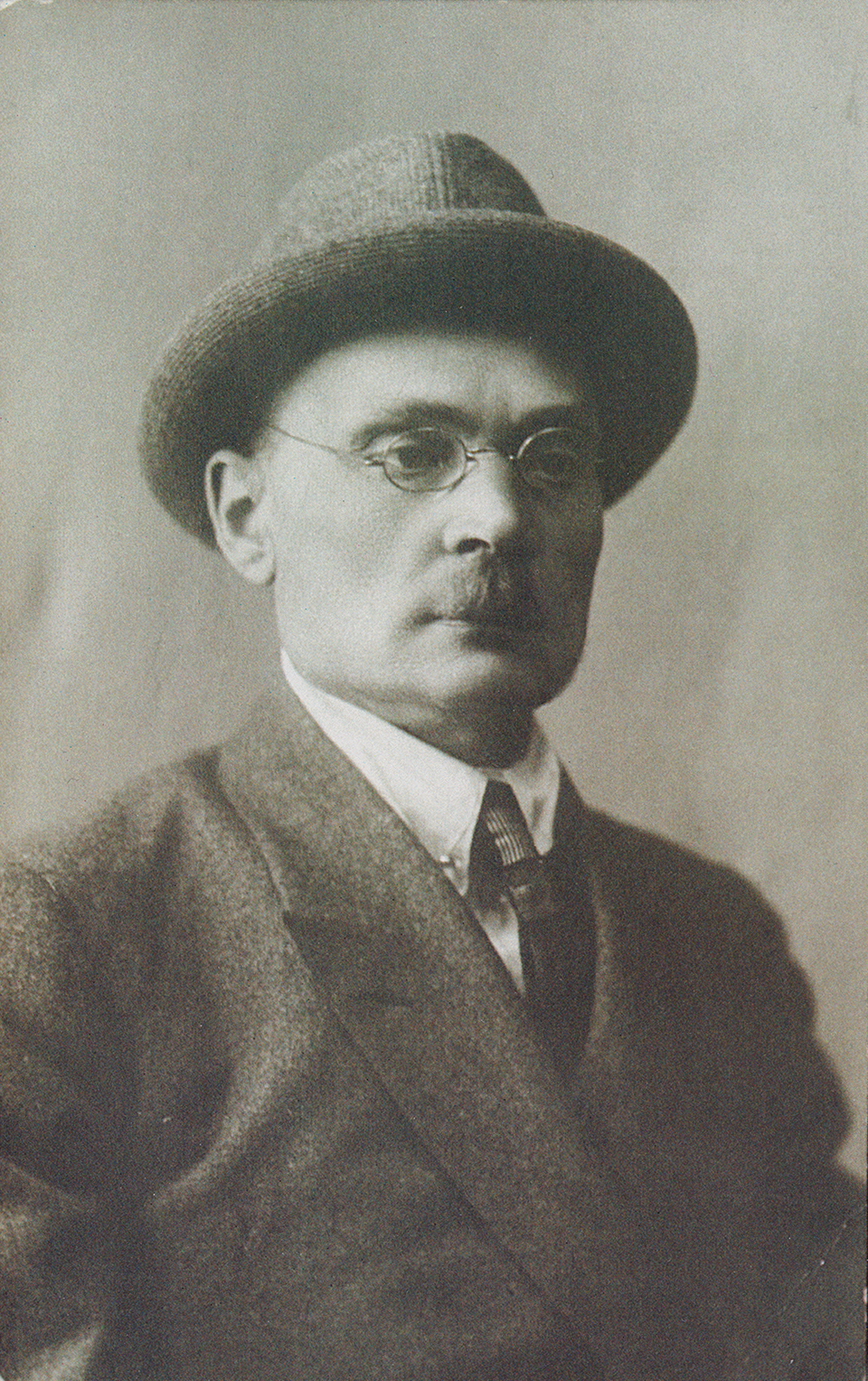
- Born: 18 November 1884; Mikalajeŭščyna, Minsk Governorate, Russian Empire (now Stowbtsy District, Minsk Region, Belarus)
- Died: 1 April 1940 (aged 55); Saratov, Russian SFSR, Soviet Union
- Occupations: Belarusian academic; leading figure of the Belarusian independence movement
- Organization: the Rada of the Belarusian Democratic Republic

Jazep Losik (also known as Jazep (Yazep) Liosik; Belarusian: Язэп Лёсік; 18 November 1884 – 1 April 1940) was a Belarusian academic, leading figure of the independence movement and a victim of Stalin's purges.

== Early years ==
Losik was born into a large farming family in the village of Mikalajeŭščyna, Minsk province of the Russian Empire (nowadays Stoŭbcy district, Minsk region of Belarus). His parents were tenants on land belonging to the Radziwill family.

He was an uncle of Belarusian poet and writer Jakub Kolas.

In 1902 Losik graduated from a pedagogical college in Novhorod-Siverskyi (Chernihiv province) and worked as a teacher in Babrujsk and in Chernihiv province.

Losik was arrested for participation in demonstrations during the Russian Revolution of 1905 but managed to escape and was hiding from persecution for several years. However, in 1911 he was arrested by the Tsarist authorities and sentenced to indefinite deportation to the Irkutsk province in Siberia.

While in Siberia, Losik collaborated with the Belarusian newspaper "Nasha Niva" and corresponded with a number of writers and public figures in Belarus.

== Involvement in Belarusian independence movement ==
After the February Revolution Losik returned to Belarus and became actively involved in the Belarusian independence movement. In 1917–1918 he edited the newspaper "Free Belarus" (“Вольная Беларусь») and became an active member of the Belarusian Socialist Assembly (Hramada).

In December 1917, he participated in the First All-Belarusian Congress and subsequently became a member of the Rada of the Belarusian Democratic Republic. He was one of the advocates of the proclamation of independence of the Belarusian Democratic Republic on 25 March 1918.

Between May 1918 and December 1919, Losik was Chairman of the Belarusian Democratic Republic and sought to achieve the international recognition of the new state and to prevent the partition of Belarus. He communicated with representatives of Germany, Poland, USA and other countries and had a meeting with the leader of Poland Józef Piłsudski.

== Academic career in Soviet Belarus ==
After the re-occupation of Minsk by the Bolsheviks in 1920, Losik withdrew from politics and engaged in cultural, educational and academic work. From July 1921 he taught at the Belarusian State University and the Belarusian Pedagogical College and was involved with the Institute of Belarusian Culture.

In 1927 he was appointed a director of the Institute of the Belarusian Language, and in 1928 became a member of the National Academy of Sciences of Belarus.

== Persecution by Soviet authorities ==
Losik's frictions with the Soviet authorities began in 1922, when his textbook "Practical Grammar of the Belarusian Language" was badly received and he was briefly arrested.

In July 1930, Losik was arrested in connection with the Case of the Union of Liberation of Belarus and was subsequently stripped off his academic titles and deported to the Saratov region of Russia.

In June 1938, Losik was arrested in connection with the case of the "Counter-Revolutionary Organisation of Political Forces in Saratov” and on 31 March 1940 was sentenced to five years in the Gulag.

== Death and memory ==
Losik died on the following day after his sentence in the Saratov prison. The official cause of his death was tuberculosis but according to some sources he was executed immediately after the verdict. His burial place is unknown.

Losik was posthumously exonerated from all charges in 1958 during the Khrushchev Thaw and then in 1988 during Gorbachev's Perestroika and in 1990 his academic titles were reinstated.

There is no place of Losik's commemoration in present-day Belarus.
