= Arkadź Smolič =

Belarusian translator, journalist and economist (1891–1938)

- Аркадзь Смоліч
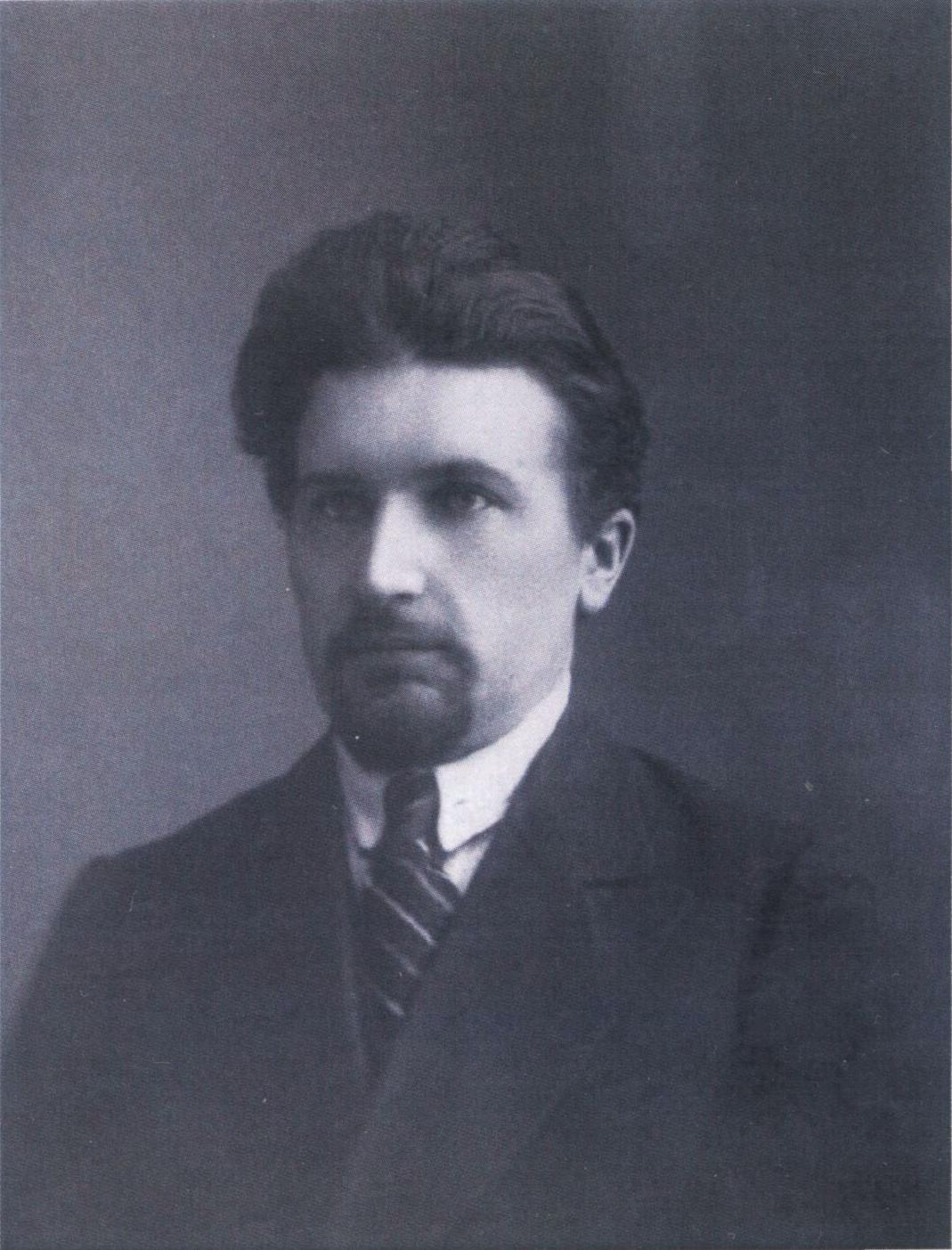
- Born: September 29, 1891; Bacevičy, Bobruysky Uyezd, Minsk Governorate (now Klichaw District, Mogilev Region of Belarus)
- Died: June 17, 1938 (aged 46); Omsk, Russia
- Cause of death: executed
- Resting place: unknown
- Education: Minsk Seminary; New Alexandria Institute of Agriculture and Forestry (Puławy, Poland)
- Occupations: academic, active participant of the Belarusian independence movement
- Organization: Rada of the Belarusian Democratic Republic

Arkadź Antonavič Smolič (also spelled Arkadzi Smolich, Belarusian: Арка́дзь Анто́навіч Смо́ліч, Russian: Арка́дий Анто́нович Смо́лич; 29 September 1891 - 17 June 1938) was an academic, active participant of the Belarusian independence movement and a victim of Stalin's purges.

== Biography ==
Arkadź Smolicz, (Belarusian Аркадзь Антонавіч Смоліч), Arkadź Antonawicz Smolicz (born September 29, 1891, in Bacewicze near Babruysk, died June 17, 1938, in Omsk) - Belarusian national activist, social democratic politician, scientist - geographer and cartographer, minister of agriculture in the government of the BRL in the Republic of Belarus, 1920 year, social and scientific activist in Soviet Belarus. He was educated at the theological seminary in Minsk, later at the New Alexandrian Institute of Agriculture and Forestry (now Puławy) and the Kiev University of Technology. From 1910, a member of the Belarusian Socialist Hramada, involved in the activities of the Belorussia cottage in Minsk. He wrote for the newspapers "Ranica" ("Раніца") and "Łuczynka" ("Лучынка"). In March 1917 he was elected to the Belarusian National Committee ("Беларускі нацыянальны камітэт"). In December, he took part in the First All-Belarusian Congress in Minsk, and as a member of the Council of the BPR, he contributed to the issuance of the Act of Independence on March 25, 1918. In the first government of the BPR, he took over as the secretary of education, traveled on diplomatic missions to Kiev, Warsaw and Berlin to lobby for recognition of the independence of the BPR. After the split in the Hramada, he organized the Belarusian Social Democratic Party and contributed to the creation of its ideological and political program. In the summer of 1919, he took the office of deputy prime minister in the government of Anton Łuckiewicz and the Ministry of Agriculture.

In 1921 he went to Vilnius, where he founded the Belarusian School Society - he became its first president.

In 1919, he published "Geography of Belarus" in Vilnius, which, after a minor elaboration, became a textbook in schools in the BSSR in 1922. He worked as a teacher at a Belarusian gymnasium in Vilnius, lectured on geography at teacher training courses.

In August 1922 he left for the BSSR, where he took a job at the agricultural commissariat, lectured on geography and agronomy at the Belarusian State University and at the Institute of Belarusian Culture. In 1924 he created the magazine "Płuh" ("Плуг") and the Belarusian sightseeing society.

In 1930, he was arrested on charges of "Belarusian nationalism" and imprisoned until August 1935 in the central regions of Russia. He was arrested again in June 1937, a year later sentenced to death and shot in the Omsk prison. Rehabilitated in 1957 and 1988 respectively.

== Early life ==
Smolič was born into the family of a parish priest in the village of Bacevičy, Minsk Governorate of the Russian Empire (nowadays in Klichaw District, Mogilev Region of Belarus).

In 1905 he graduated from the Minsk Seminary and in 1916 from the New Alexandria Institute of Agriculture and Forestry in Puławy (Poland). He also studied at the Kiev Polytechnic Institute.

== Involvement in the Belarusian independence movement ==
While a student, Smolič became involved in the Belarusian movement by joining the Belarusian Socialist Assembly (Hramada) and later edited its newspaper. He became particularly active during World War I organising conferences of Belarusian political organisations and writing numerous articles advocating the Belarusian independence movement.

Smolič actively participated in the First All-Belarusian Congress in December 1917, was one of the initiators of the declaration of independence of the Belarusian Democratic Republic and later became its Minister of Education.

== Life in Soviet Belarus ==
After the defeat of the Belarusian independence movement by the Red Army, Smolič went into exile for a short time but returned to Soviet Belarus in 1922. He was accepted by the Soviet authorities, served in many scholarly institutions and administrative bodies and initiated many important research projects in the fields of geography, agriculture and economics.

He was actively involved in the establishment of the Belarusian Academy of Sciences and was one of the authors of the Academy's charter.

One of his most important accomplishments as scholar was the first textbook on Belarusian geography which was used by thousands of students.

== Persecution and execution ==
In 1930 the attitude of the Soviet authorities changed. Smolič was arrested in June of that year in connection with the Case of the "Union of Liberation of Belarus" and deported for 5 years to the Perm and Tyumen regions of Russia. He was rearrested in June 1937 and sentenced to death by an NKVD troika.

He was posthumously exonerated of all charges during the Khrushchev Thaw in 1957 and Gorbachev's Perestroika in 1988.

== Works ==
"Geography of Belarus", Wilno 1919

"Economic situation of Belarus before the war and revolution"

"Belarusian Soviet Socialist Republic and its districts"

"Types of geographic latitudes of Belarus" (dysertacja naukowa)

"Organization of the peasant economy in the districts of Central Belarus"

"Geographic and topographic sketch of Western Belarus"

"The population of Western Belarus, its national and professional composition"
