= Piotra Sych =

Belarusian writer and journalist

Piotra Sych (Belarusian: Пятро Сыч or Пётра Сыч) (January 18, 1912 – June 20, 1963), was a Belarusian writer and journalist, born in Baturyna, Western Belarus, near Vileyka.

He started his journalistic career in Wilno in 1930's, initially writing for the Polish language newspapers, and studying philosophy at the Wilno University. In 1939 he was drafted for the Polish army, then arrested by the Soviets, spent some time in a jail in Polatsk, eventually sentenced to 10 years and sent away to Komi. As a citizen of Poland, he was released under the terms of Sikorski-Mayski Agreement and travelled to Samarkand in September 1941. There he joined the Polish Army in the East, being formed under command of General Władysław Anders, just like hundreds of other Belarusians from Western Belarus (Kresy). He spent the rest of the war fighting in General Anders' Polish II Corps. He was wounded four times, and was a participant of the famous Battle of Monte Cassino.

After the war he spent some time in England before moving to Munich, Germany in 1951 where he started publishing a magazine in Belarusian. In 1954 he became one of the first employees of the newly opened Belarus Service of Radio Free Europe/Radio Liberty. He wrote the script of the stations' first radio programme in Belarusian language and was aired on May 20, 1954. The piece; "Azimuth of the Heart" was an exhortation and greeting to Belarusian people under Soviet rule "from the compatriots in the free world."

In 1960's several years before his death, he started writing a memoir about the Belarusian soldiers at the Battle of Monte Cassino. According to various estimates, there were 1000-2000 Belarusians in this battle and about 200-250 of them were killed in action. The novel was called "Death and nightingales" (Сьмерць і салаўі). It was published in installments in the Belarusian magazine in Munich "Backaushchyna" from 1962-1963. The book was not completely finished though by Piotra Sych as he unexpectedly died at the age of 51. His wife Elza helped to prepare and publish it as a separate book several years after his death.
