= Vatslaw Lastowski =

Belarusian politician (1883–1938)

- Вацлаў Ластоўскі
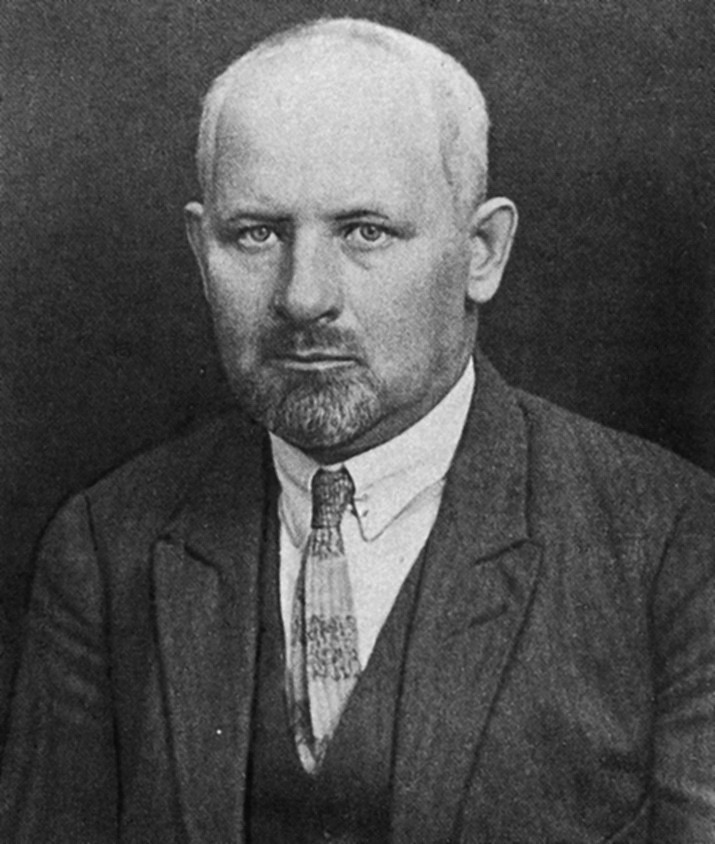

Prime Minister of the Belarusian Democratic Republic
- In office 1919–1923
- Preceded by: Anton Lutskyevich
- Succeeded by: Alaksandar Tsvikyevich

Personal details
- Born: November 8, 1883 Kalyesniki, Disnensky Uyezd, Vilna Governorate, Russian Empire (now Lastovichi, Belarus)
- Died: January 23, 1938 (aged 54) Saratov, RSFSR, Soviet Union (now Russia)
- Occupation: Politician, writer, historian

Vatslaw Yustynavich Lastowski (Belarusian: Вацлаў Юстынавіч Ластоўскі, Belarusian pronunciation: [ˈvatsɫaw jusˈtɨnavʲitʂ ɫasˈtɔwskʲi], Lithuanian: Vaclovas Lastauskas; 8 November 1883 – 23 January 1938) was a leading figure of the Belarusian independence movement in the early 20th century and the Prime Minister of the Belarusian Democratic Republic from 1919 to 1923, as well as a writer, historian and academic of the Belarusian Academy of Sciences persecuted by the Soviet authorities.

== Early years ==
Lastowski was born on 8 November 1883 in the village of Kalyesnikaw in the Disna uyezd of the Vilna Governorate of the Russian Empire (now Lastovichi, Belarus) into the family of a landless nobleman. Having received his primary education at the Pahost Primary School, he moved to Vilnius in 1896 where he worked as a shop assistant and, later, in Šiauliai, as a clerk. In 1902, Lastowski joined the Polish Socialist Party which was active in Lithuania. In 1905-1906 he worked as a librarian of a student library in St. Petersburg where he also attended lectures at the Faculty of History without being enrolled at the university.

In 1906, Lastowski relocated to Riga to work as a railway clerk. He attempted to pass examinations to receive a secondary school qualification but, despite good results in the main subjects, failed due to his poor knowledge of the Russian language. Afterwards, he would not be formally educated anywhere.

In Riga, Lastowski became actively involved in the Belarusian national movement. He was a member of the Belarusian Socialist Assembly between 1906 and 1908 and was imprisoned for socialist propaganda for several months in 1906. Lastowski was also a secretary of the editorial board of the Belarusian newspaper Nasha Niva.

== Involvement in the Belarusian independence movement ==
Starting from 1915, Lastowski openly supported the idea of independence of Belarus both from Russia and Poland.

In January 1915 Lastowski, together with other prominent leaders of the Belarusian independence movement such as Vincent Sviatapolk-Mirski, Ivan and Anton Lutskievich, signed a petition calling for the German authorities that occupied Western Belarus during WWI to authorise the publication of Belarusian newspapers. At that time Lastowski headed the Belarusian Publishing Society and a Belarusian bookstore in Vilnius. He was also involved in writing and publishing school textbooks by a private publishing house.

Lastowski was one of the leaders of the party Christian Unity in 1915. He co-authored The Memorandum of the Representatives of Belarus which formulated the right of the Belarusian people to national and political development and was presented at an international conference in Lausanne in 1916. In 1916—1917 Lastowski edited the newspaper Homan (“babble”) and, in 1918, published the journal Kryvich (“the Krivich”).

At the beginning of 1918, Lastowski founded the Union of Independence and Indivisibility of Belarus which formulated the guidelines for the creation of an independent Belarusian state. In 1918-1919 he was a member of the Belarusian Council of Vilnius. He was elected as one of the representatives of this council to participate in the Rada of the Belarusian Democratic Republic that, on 25 March 1918, accepted the Third Constituent Charter and proclaimed the independence of the Belarusian Democratic Republic.

In November 1918 Lastowski became a member of the Council of Lithuania. At the end of 1918, he was the head of the Belarusian representation in Lithuania and the Belarusian attaché at the Embassy of Lithuania in Berlin. In 1919 he became the leader of the Belarusian Socialist Revolutionaries.

In December 1919 Lastowski was appointed Prime Minister of the Belarusian Democratic Republic. On 17 December 1919, he was arrested in Minsk by the Polish authorities that did not recognise the independent Belarusian state. Released in February 1920, Lastowski went to Riga. In 1920 he addressed the Entente states with a request to support the government of the Belarusian Democratic Republic. Lastowski also initiated the creation of the Union of Belarusian Parties for the Struggle for an Independent and Unified Belarus against Soviet Rule and against Polish Occupation at a Belarusian conference in Riga on 20 October 1920. From 1920 to 1923 Lastowski went on diplomatic missions to Belgium, Germany, the Vatican, Italy, Czechoslovakia, France, Switzerland, and other countries. In 1923 he resigned from the post of prime minister of the Belarusian Democratic Republic and withdrew from political activities.

== Life in Lithuania and relocation to Soviet Belarus ==
Between 1923 and 1927 Lastowski edited the journal Kryvich in Kaunas and published several textbooks. He headed the committee for the 400th Anniversary of Belarusian Book Printing: 1525—1925 as well as the Union for National and State Liberation of Belarus. In November 1926 he was invited by the Institute of Belarusian Culture (Inbelkult) to participate in an academic conference on the reform of the Belarusian orthography and was elected Head of the Graphic Committee of the conference. The refusal of the Lithuanian government to finance Kryvich and the coup d'état of 17 December 1926 prompted Lastowski to relocate to Soviet Belarus in April 1927. He was appointed Director of the Belarusian State Museum, worked at the Inbelkult, and was head of the ethnographic department of the Belarusian Academy of Sciences. During an ethnographic expedition organized by Lastowski, the Cross of Saint Euphrosyne, one of the Belarusian national symbols, was found.

== Persecution by the Soviet authorities and death ==
In October 1929 Lastowski was dismissed as secretary of the Belarusian Academy of Sciences. On 21 July 1930, during an ethnographic expedition to Siberia, he was arrested in the Case of the Union of Liberation of Belarus. On 6 December 1930, he was deprived of his academic title which was restored to him posthumously in 1990. On 10 April 1931 Lastowski was sentenced to be exiled for five years to Saratov, where he directed the department of old prints and manuscripts of the university library.

Per Order No. 33 of the Head Department of Literature and Publishing Houses on June 3, 1937, all books by Lastowski were mandated to be burned.

Arrested again on 20 August 1937, Lastowski was convicted as “an agent of the Polish intelligence service and participant of the national-fascist organisation” by the Supreme Military Court of the USSR and executed in Saratov. Lastowski was posthumously exonerated in 1958 (first sentence) and 1988 (second sentence).

== Notable works ==
The History of Belarusian [Kryuski] Books. (Kaunas 1926).

Chronicle of the G. D. of Lithuania and Samogitia (Kaunas 1925)

- Кароткая гісторыя Беларусі [A Short History of Belarus], Vilna (Vilnius), 1910. It was the first book that attempted to underline the Ruthenian side of the Grand Duchy of Lithuania and present known facts of Belarusian History until 1905 from a Belarusian perspective.
- Што трэба ведаць кожнаму беларусу? [What Every Belarusian Should Know], Minsk (Mensk), 1918.
- Слоўнік геаметрычных і трыганаметрычных тэрмінаў і сказаў [Dictionary of Geometric and Trigonometric Terms and Sentences], co-authored with Klawdzi Duzh-Dushewski, Kaunas (Kovno), 1923.
- Падручны расійска-крыўскі (беларускі) слоўнік [Concise Russian-Krivich (Belarusian) Dictionary], Kaunas (Kovno), 1924.
- Лѣтописецъ Великого кн(я)зства Литовъско(го) и Жомоитсъкого [Chronicle of the Grand Duchy of Lithuania and Samogitia] (1925). (in Belarusian). pp. 68. Kaunas (Kovno).
- Гісторыя беларускай (крыўскай) кнігі: (Спроба паясніцельнай кнігапісі ад канца Х да пачатку ХІХ стагоддзя) [The History of Belarusian (Krivich) Books], Kaunas (Kovno), 1926. The fundamental book offered a survey of over one thousand of the most significant manuscripts, old documents, and old prints, dating from the beginning of the Belarusian literature in the tenth century to the nineteenth century.
