= Aliaksandar Burbis =

Russian-Belarusian journalist and academic (1885–1922)

Aliaksandr Burbis

Chairmen of the Belarusian Assembly

Personal details
- Born: 8 October 1885 Vilnius
- Died: 20 March 1922 (aged 36) Minsk
- Resting place: Staražoŭskija cemetery
- Citizenship: Russian (Russian Empire) Belarusian (People's Republic)

Aliaksandar Burbis (8 October 1885 – 20 March 1922), better known as Aleś Burbis, was a Russian-Belarusian journalist, historian, political figure, actor, director, and ethnologist. He was a founder of Belarusian theatre. He served as the first Chairman of the Belarusian Rada of the Belarusian Democratic Republic.

== Early life ==
Aliaksandar Burbis was born in Vilnius, Lithuania. He studied at Vilnius Gymnasium.

== Career ==
He served as Chairman of the Belarusian Rada of the Belarusian Democratic Republic.

He was an opinion journalist in Lithuania, then a historian (mostly of the Russian Empire), a theatrologist and an Ethnologist in Minsk. He authored studies on economic geography, history, ethnography, agriculture, and banking.

He was a cofounder of the Belarusian Socialist Society (BSG), and a member of its Central Committee. In January 1906, he declared the Republic of Belarus (the "Meyshagol Republic") in the Meishagol parish of the Vilna district. In 1906, the Society organized mass farmer strikes. He organized strikes in the Nowograd region and in Minsk, where he also led work on forming trade unions. On 24 August 1906, Burbis was arrested in Dolnaya near Shchorsau in the Navahrad Region (he had a passport in the name of Henry Bukhovetsky). He remained in prison until the middle of 1909, falling ill with tuberculosis. After his release, he worked in the Vilna Agricultural Society. Via his initiative, on 12 February 1910, the First Belarusian Party was held in Vilnius.

Burbis moved to Moscow (1915), where he began working at the People's Bank. He was the creator and chairman of the Moscow organization of the BSG (1917). He was a participant in the Congress of Belarusian National Organizations (Minsk, March 1917). He was twice arrested in Moscow by Soviet authorities (1917, 1918). Burbis then became consul of the Belarusian People's Republic in Moscow (1918). He became a member of the People's Commissariat of Agriculture of the Lithuanian-Belarusian SSR (May 1919). He served as an editor of Soviet Belarus in Smolensk. He authored a memo to the Central Committee of the RCP(b) (14 January 1920), similar to the "Statement of the 32nd". The note was accompanied by an appendix on the creation of an exemplary Belarusian Soviet Republic that contained information about the historical past, political and social order of Belarus, the first steps of the Soviet government in the republic, and made critical remarks in connection with the mistakes made in the implementation of the national-state policy by the leadership.

He served as Deputy People's Commissar of Foreign Affairs of the BSSR (1921). He was one of the organizers of the Red Cross Society of the BSSR. He was a member of the Marchlevsky Commission on issues of the Peace of Riga. He was a member of the Central Committee of the BSSR (1921–1922). He participated in the development of the treaty between the BSSR and the RSFSR. He joined the Communist Party (1921).

He died of tuberculosis on 20 March 1922 in Minsk. He was buried in Starozhovsky Cemetery. In the 1950s, the Starozhovsky cemetery was destroyed. His remains were lost at some juncture.

== Social and cultural activities ==
He published in Nasha Niva under various pseudonyms. He wrote articles on the national liberation issue (after February 1917), and on the history, ethnography, and economy of Belarus.

He was a member of the First Belarusian Troupe of Ignat Buynitskyi, a Belarusian music and drama group in Vilnius. He was a manager, director, actor and reader at the first Belarusian theatre parties there. He helped organize drama circles. He staged M. Krapivnytskyi's On Revision in the Petrouschyna estate near Minsk (1906, V. Dunin-Martsinkevich's Matchmaking in Vilnius (1915).

In August 1920, he finished the scientific monograph "Brief Sketch on the Economic Geography of Belarus" (published in Narodnoe hozyaztyo Belorussii. 1922. No. 4) He was the first to describe the Belarusian territorial and economic complex, analysed economic ties with other regions, the first Belarusian scientist to calculate the trade balance of Belarus, and emphasized the inconsistency of the then borders with the needs of economic development.

== Bibliography ==
- News of the People's Commissariat of Education of the USSR. 1921, No. 1–2
- Essay on the economic geography of Belarus // National Economy of Belarus. 1922, No. 4
- Belarusian socialist society in the first period of its work (1903–1907) Belarus. Mn., 1924.
