= Kastuś Jezavitaŭ =

Belarusian independence activist

- Кастусь Езавітаў
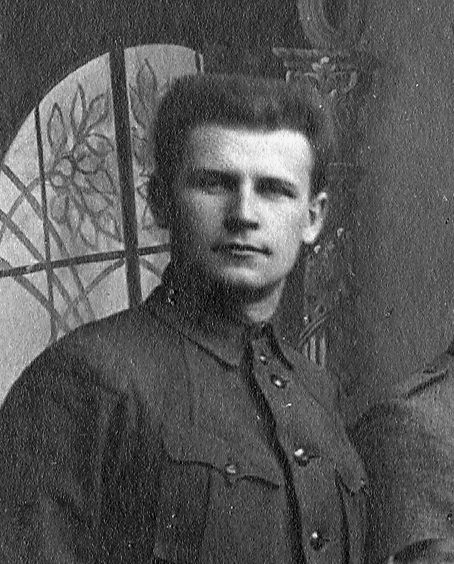
- Born: November 17, 1893; Dźvinsk, Vitebsk Governorate (nowadays Daugavpils in Latvia)
- Died: May 23, 1946 (aged 52); Minsk, Byelorussian SSR, Soviet Union
- Occupations: political and military leader within the Belarusian independence movement
- Organizations: Rada of the Belarusian Democratic Republic; Belarusian Central Council

Kastuś Jezavitaŭ (Belarusian: Касту́сь Езаві́таў; also known as Kanstancin Barysavič Jezavitaŭ, Belarusian: Канстанці́н Бары́савіч Езаві́таў; 17 November 1893 – 23 May 1946) was a political and military leader within the Belarusian independence movement of the early 20th century.

== Early years ==
Jezavitaŭ was born into the family of a military officer in the city of Dźvinsk, Vitebsk Governorate of the Russian Empire (nowadays Daugavpils in Latvia).

He studied in Dźvinsk and graduated from the Viciebsk Teachers' Institute. Jezavitaŭ then completed the Pavlovsk Military College in St. Petersburg in 1916.

== Involvement in the Belarusian independence movement ==
Jezavitaŭ became involved in the Belarusian independence movement in 1913 by joining the Belarusian Socialist Assembly (Hramada).

After the February Revolution, he began to organize Belarusian groups among soldiers of the Russian Imperial Army and joined the Belarusian Military Council. He took active part in the First All-Belarusian Congress, was arrested by the Bolshevik secret police Cheka but managed to escape.

After the retreat of the Red Army, Jezavitaŭ became the Belarusian commander of the city of Minsk when the Belarusian administration took power on 19 February 1918. He was elected to the provisional Belarusian Government in February 1918 and was involved in the declaration of independence of the Belarusian Democratic Republic on 25 March 1918.

From 1918 to 1920 Jezavitaŭ served the Rada of the Belarusian Democratic Republic in various capacities first as Minister of Defence and then as a military attaché in newly independent Latvia and Estonia. He also established diplomatic relations with the governments of Lithuania and Finland, sought military assistance from the government of the United States and was instrumental in securing diplomatic recognition of the Belarusian Democratic Republic by the Baltic states and Finland.

Since March 14, 1919 Jezavitaŭ was the commander of the 1st Belarusian Regiment in Grodno. On April 15, Polish troops marching on Vilnius began to enter Grodno. Jezavitaŭ went to Warsaw with Jurgis Šaulys as part of the Lithuanian diplomatic mission. Colonel Uspienski, who replaced him, signed an agreement with the Polish command on April 23, under which the Belarusian regiment remained part of the Lithuanian army, but was subordinated to the Polish command. After returning from Warsaw on April 24, Jezavitaŭ defied the agreement and wanted to evacuate the regiment from Grodno. However, the German and Lithuanian defense ministries opposed this step. As a result, Jezavitaŭ surrendered command to Colonel Antonov and went to Kaunas. It is likely that this was also the will of the government of the Belarusian People's Republic, which in April changed its position to favor Poland.

== Later life ==
After the defeat of the Belarusian independence movement by the Red Army, Jezavitaŭ went into exile and settled in his native Dźvinsk (which became part of Latvia pursuant to the 1920 Latvian-Soviet Peace Treaty and was renamed Daugavpils) where he lived until 1944. He organised a number of Belarusian schools and organisations within the local Belarusian community and edited several Belarusian periodicals in Latvia.

In 1944 Jezavitaŭ joined the Belarusian Central Council in Minsk and was appointed its Defence Minister.

== Death ==
Jezavitaŭ was captured by the Soviet intelligence SMERSH in 1945. He died in incarceration in Minsk on 23 May 1946. The official causes of his death were tuberculosis and dystrophy but some sources believe that he was executed.

== Bibliography ==
- Łatyszonek, Oleg (1995). Białoruskie formacje wojskowe 1917 – 1923. Białystok.
