= Mikola Abramchyk =

Jewish-Belarusian exile politician (1903–1970)

- Мікола Абрамчык

President of the Rada of the Belarusian Democratic Republic in exile
- In office 1943 – May 1970
- Preceded by: Vasil Zacharka
- Succeeded by: Vincent Žuk-Hryškievič

Personal details
- Born: 16 August 1903 Syčavičy, Vileysky Uyezd, Vilna Governorate, Russian Empire
- Died: 25 May 1970 (aged 66) Paris, France
- Party: Independent
- Spouse: Nina Laŭkovič
- Education: Charles University in Prague
- Profession: Journalist, editor

Mikola Abramchyk (Belarusian: Мікола Сямёнавіч Абрамчык, Russian: Николай Семёнович Абрамчик) (16 August 1903 – 29 May 1970) was a Belarusian journalist and emigre politician and president of the Belarusian Democratic Republic in exile during 1943–1970.

== Life ==
He attended school in Radashkovichy. In 1923, after the civil war in Russia, he emigrated to Czechoslovakia, lived in Prague, and studied agricultural sciences there. He was a member of the Association of Belarusian Student Organization.

In 1930 he went to Paris, where he developed the Belarusian association of workers, Chaurus. He published the magazines Biuleten and Recha. He worked in the emigration for cultural and political organizations. He was a member of the Belarusian Committee of Self-leadership in Berlin. In 1943, he was removed by the Germans from the Committee in charges of conducting prohibited activities and arrested. After being released, he returned to Paris, where he was chosen the president of the Belarusian Democratic Republic in exile. He showed particular concern about the fate of Belarusian refugees. Throughout the time he was under surveillance by the Gestapo because of his rumoured Jewish background and suspicion of conspiracy to the detriment of the Third Reich. After the war he was involved in international anticommunist activities.

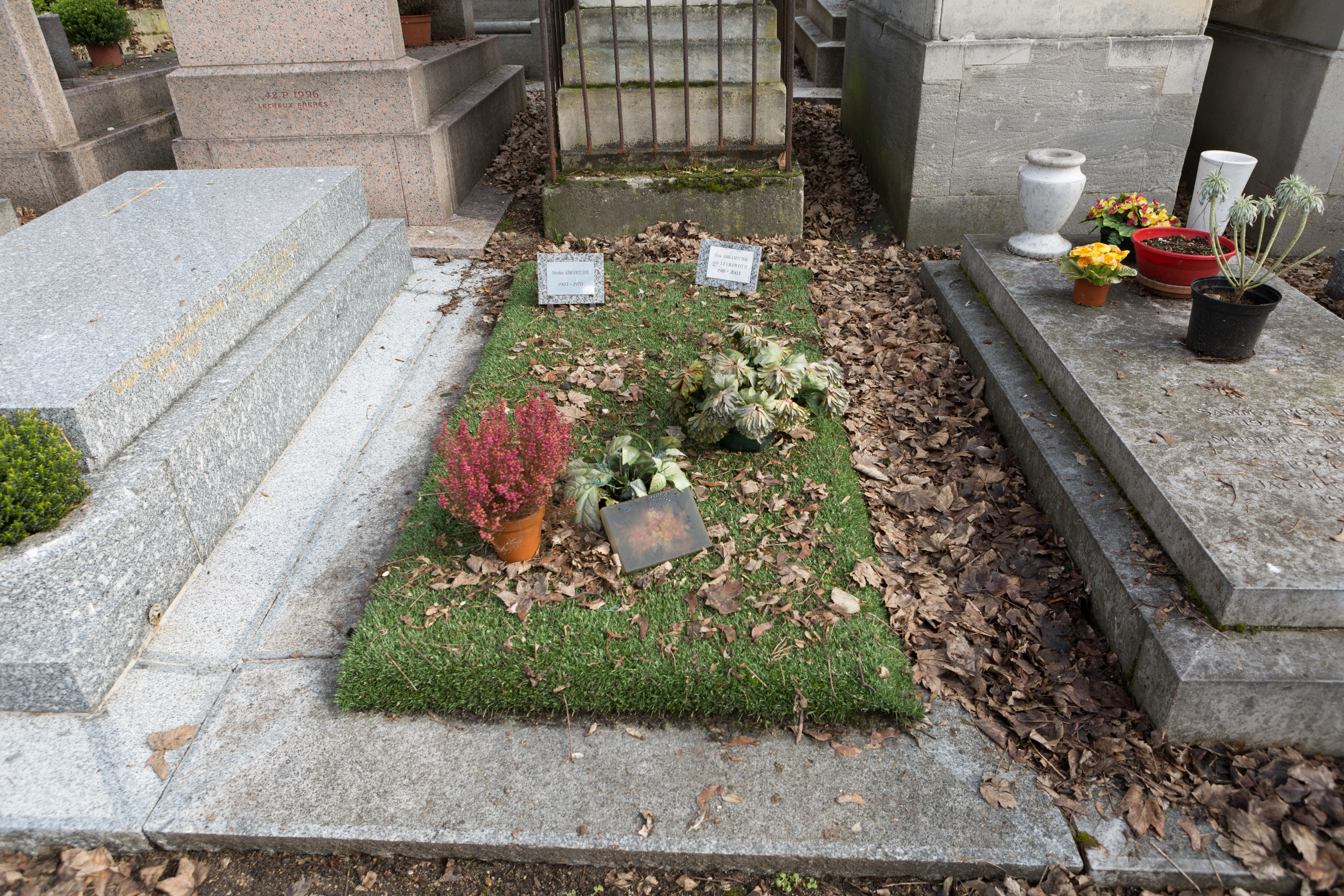
Grave of Mikola Abramchyk in Paris

On 28 November 1947, in Paris, Abramchyk was elected as president of the Rada of the Belarusian Democratic Republic which became a competitor of the Belarusian Central Council led by Radasłaŭ Astroŭski. In 1950, in Toronto he has published the brochure I Accuse the Kremlin of the Genocide of My Nation.

In the late 1950s and the 1960s, he chaired the League for the Liberation of the Peoples of the USSR, comprising representatives of the Armenians, Azerbaijanis, Ukrainians, Georgians, Belarusians and North Caucasians.

Abramchyk is buried at the Père Lachaise Cemetery (division 59).
