= American Committee for the Liberation of the Peoples of Russia =

Former American anti-Soviet organization

The American Committee for the Liberation of the Peoples of Russia (ACLPR, AMCOMLIB), also known as the American Committee for Liberation from Bolshevism, was an American anti-communist organization founded in 1950 which worked for the abolition of the Soviet government, primarily by "organizing [Soviet] émigrés into an effective political warfare force and equipping them with a radio station capable of reaching listeners behind the Iron Curtain."

The committee was a joint project of the State Department and the CIA via the Office of Policy Coordination. It was developed by George Kennan and Frank Wisner in 1950 and incorporated as a non-profit in 1951. The first committee members were Eugene Lyons, William Henry Chamberlin, Time Inc. Vice-President Allen Grover, William L. White, and William Yandell Elliott, with Lyons serving as chair. It was a part of CIA project QKACTIVE.

Mikola Abramchyk was the representative of a coordinating committee of organizations representing six non-Russian ethnic minorities (Ukrainians, Georgians, Azeris, North Caucasians, Armenians, and Belarusians), which was founded in Europe to represent non-Russian refugees willing to associate their activities with AMCOMLIB.

ALCPR founded in 1953 the anti-communist broadcaster Radio Liberation, later known as Radio Liberty. It was based in Lampertheim in Hesse, Germany, and broadcast Russian-language programmes into the USSR while receiving funding from the U.S. Congress. Meanwhile, Soviet authorities attempted to jam their broadcasts. In 1973–1976, Radio Liberty was merged with Radio Free Europe, based in the English Garden in Munich. Following the Velvet Revolution in 1995, Radio Free Europe/Radio Liberty (RFE/RL) moved to Wenceslas Square in Prague.

It published its own quarterly Problems of the Peoples of the USSR (Munich; 1958–1966).

== See also ==
- Committee for the Liberation of the Peoples of Russia, a committee of Russian anticommunists organized in Germany during World War II
- Captive Nations
- Anti-Bolshevik Bloc of Nations
