= Zośka Vieras =

Belarusian writer and painter (1892–1991)

- Зоська Верас
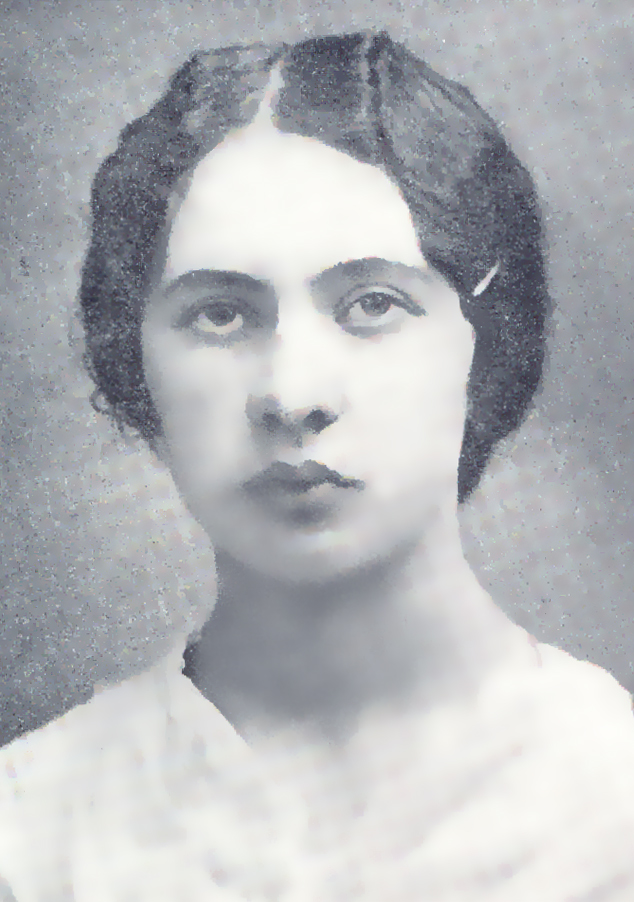
- Vieras in 1914
- Born: Liudvika Sivickaja; September 30, 1892; Medzhybizh, Russian Empire
- Died: October 8, 1991 (aged 99); Vilnius, Lithuania
- Occupations: Writer, poet
- Notable work: Беларуска-польска-расейска-лацінскі батанічны слоўнік [Belarusian-Polish-Russian-Latin Botanical Dictionary]

Ludvika Sivickaja-Vojcik (Belarusian: Людвіка Сівіцкая-Войцік; 30 September 1892 – 8 October 1991), known by her pen name Zośka Vieras (Belarusian: Зоська Верас), was a Belarusian writer and one of the initiators and active participants of the Belarusian national revival.

== Family and early years ==
Vieras was born into a noble family in the village of Medzhybizh (nowadays – in Khmelnytskyi district, Ukraine) on 30 September 1892. Her great-grandfather Ihnat Kulakoŭski was a prominent teacher and researcher of the Belarusian ancient history. He was a member of several scientific societies in Denmark, Vilna, Warsaw and St Petersburg. Vieras's father, Anton Sivicki, was born in Hrodna (nowadays – in Belarus) and pursued a military career. His love for reading as well as his national views had a great impact on Vieras's ideas later in her life.

After the death of her father in 1908, Vieras, with her mother, moved to Hrodna where she graduated from a private high school for girls (1912) and was an active participant, librarian and secretary of the Hrodna Club of Belarusian Youth. Later, she attended a 10-month course on gardening and apiculture as well as a 6-week military nursing course in Warsaw (1914). Despite her interest in botany, Vieras did not continue her formal education due to her poor health and the beginning of World War I.

== Life in Minsk ==
Between 1915 and 1918 Vieras lived in Minsk and worked as a secretary of several Belarusian national organizations, including:

- The Minsk Section of the Belarusian Society of Help for Victims of War, a charity organisation helping victims of World War I and one of the centres of the Belarusian national movement based in Minsk (1915-1917);
- The Belarusian National Committee, created by Belarusian national organisations in 1917, which role was to formulate, in coordination with the Russian Provisional Government, the principles of the Belarusian autonomy within the Russian Federal Republic and to prepare elections to the Belarusian Home Rada (Council) (Belarusian: Беларуская краёвая рада);
- The Central Rada (Council) of Belarusian Organisations that coordinated the activities of Belarusian national organisations in July – October 1917;
- The Belarusian Socialist Assembly, a revolutionary party in the Belarusian territory of the Russian Empire struggling for the Belarusian autonomy.

In 1917 Vieras participated in the First All-Belarusian Congress that played an important role in the consolidation of the Belarusian national liberation movement. In 1918 she became a member of the Rada of the Belarusian Democratic Republic.

== In the Estate of Grandfather ==
In 1918-1922 Vieras lived in the estate of Aĺchoŭniki which belonged to her grandfather. During this time she took care of her ill mother and new born child Anton Šantyr whose father was Fabijan Šantyr, Belarusian poet, writer and public figure sentenced to death and executed by the Soviet authorities in 1920. Later, Anton Šantyr would be also persecuted by the Soviet authorities and would spend ten years in the Gulag prison camps.

== Vilnius period ==
In 1923 Vieras moved to Vilnius where she would spend the rest of her life. In 1926 she married Anton Vojcik and, in 1927, their daughter Halina, who would become a famous philologue, was born.

In Vilnius, Vieras was an administrator of the editorial boards of several newspapers published by the Belarusian Peasants' and Workers' Union (1924-1929), an editor of the magazines for kids ‘Zaranka’ (“Morning Star”, 1927–1931) and “Praleska” (“Scilla”, 1925–1935), the chairperson of the Belarusian Cooperative Society “Pčala” (“Bee”, 1928–1939), and an editor of the beekeeping journal “Bielaruskaja borć” (“Belarusian Beehive”, 1934–1938).

She supported Belarusian political prisoners that were held in the Lukiškės Prison. She helped take Michaś Mašara's poems out of the prison and publish his first collection of poetry “Малюнкі” (“Drawings”, 1928). Vieras's own works, together with poems of another prominent Belarusian poet Natallia Arsiennieva, appeared at this time in the journals “Šliach moladzi” (“The Way of Youth”) and “Studenckaja dumka” (“Student’s Thoughts”).

Only in 1961 she was finally “discovered” by the philologue Arsieni Lis who was researching documents for his doctoral thesis in the Vilnius Archives. Since then, she had been visited by writers (Uladzimier Karatkievič, Ryhor Baradulin, Larysa Hienijuš, Danuta Bičeĺ-Zahnietava, Alieś Bačyla), researchers (Adam Maĺdzis, Janka Salamievič, Hienadź Kisialioŭ, Vitaĺ Skalaban), journalists and students and became the centre of the Belarusian literary life of Vilnius. In 1982, Vieras became a member of the Union of Writers of the USSR.

She was one of the founders of the Society of Belarusian Culture in Lithuania established in 1989.

Vieras died on 8 October 1991, at the age of ninety-nine, and is buried in the Paneriai cemetery in Vilnius.

== Notable works ==
- Беларуска-польска-расейска-лацінскі батанічны слоўнік [Belarusian-Polish-Russian-Latin Botanical Dictionary], Vilna, 1924;
- Гісторыя ўжываньня зёлак у лячэньні [History of the Use of Herbs in Treatment], 1934;
- "Заранка" [Morning Star] // Полымя. 1968. No. 4.
- Пяць месяцаў у Мінску [Five Months in Minsk] // The Way of the Poet, Minsk, 1975;
- Каласкі: Вершы, апавяданні [Ears of Corn: Poems, short stories], Minsk, 1985;
- Старое Гродна // Краю мой — Нёман: Гродзеншчына літаратурная [Old Hrodna // My Homeland – Nioman: Literary Hrodna], Minsk, 1986.
- Лісты Зоські Верас да Апалёніі Савёнак [Zośka Vieras's letters to Apalionija Savionak] / Падр. да друку й камэнт. Н. Гардзіенкі // Запісы = Zapisy. — 2004. — Кн. 27. — С. 251–257.
- «Дасьпела душа мая ў цярпеньні...» Вершы і імпрэсіі [My Soul Has Matured in Patience: Poems and Impressions] // Наша Вера : часопіс. — 2012. — No. 3 (61). — С. 46, 47.
- Я помню ўсё. Успаміны, лісты [I remember everything. Memoirs, letters]/ Укладальнік Міхась Скобла. — Гародня; Wrocław: 2013. — 476 с. — (Гарадзенская бібліятэка). — ISBN 978-83-7893-104-1
