= Belarusian-Soviet conflict =

Russian Civil War spillover

Belarusian Soviet conflict Belarusian War of Independence
- Part of the Russian Civil War
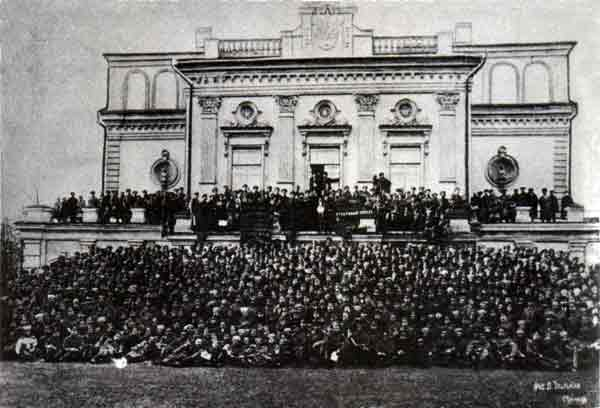
- Delegates of the First Congress of Military and Workers' Deputies of the Army and Home Front of the Western Front. Minsk, April 1917.
Date	December 1917 – 1918
Location	Belarus
Result	Belarussian victory
Territorial changes	Formation of the Belarusian People's Republic

Belligerents
Great Belarus Council; Central Belarus Military Council; Executive Committee of the Council of the First All-Belarusian Congress; Kingdom of Poland; Polish Main Military Committee German Empire	Russia; Western Oblast (1917–1918); Belarusian Regional Committee (BRC)

Commanders and leaders
Kyprian Kandratovich; Symon Rak-Michajłoŭski; Kastuś Jezavitaŭ; Władysław Raczkiewicz; Józef Dowbor-Muśnicki	Nikolai Krylenko; Alexander Miasnikian; Evsey Kancher

Units involved
Armed Forces of Belarusian People's Republic; Polish I Corps in Russia	Red Army

The Belarusian-Soviet conflict (Note: Also known as the October Revolution and the Establishment of Belarusian Statehood, Belarusian-Bolshevik conflict, Conflict between the Council of the All-Belarusian Congress and Oblispolkom, Bolshevik coup d'état in Belarus, and Belarusian War of Independence) was a political and military confrontation in late 1917 and early 1918 between units in favour of the Great Belarusian Rada and subordinated to the Central Belarusian Military Rada (CWBR) on the one hand, and on the other hand the Bolshevik Red Guards detachments of the Western Region, Russian Socialist Republic.

== Title ==
In modern Belarusian historiography there is no single name for the period from the October coup d'état to the proclamation of the Belarusian People's Republic.

The variant "The October Revolution and the Establishment of Belarusian Statehood" is mostly used.

The contemporary Polish-Belarusian historian Aleh Latyshonok uses several names for this period of history: the Belarusian-Bolshevik conflict, Belarusian War of Independence and the Bolshevik coup in Belarus.

== History ==
In early December 1917, contradictions arose between the Belarusian nationalists and the local Bolshevik leadership, which seized power in the region with the help of the Western Front's rebel units.

On December 2, 1917, the plenum of the Bolshevik Executive Committee of the Western Region and the Western Front considered the question of "nationalisation" of the army, i.e., formation of national military units. The only Belarusian among the commissars, the sailor B. Mukha demanded that the executive committee either authorize the creation of Belarusian regiments or not authorize the creation of any national regiments. The Plenum decided to dissolve the Polish units and disallow the creation of Belarusian ones.

On December 5, there was a meeting of the Council of People's Commissars of the Western Region and the Western Front, at which the Latvian Kārlis Landers made a report about the so-called "hostile activity of the Belarusian nationalists". At this meeting, it was decided to dissolve the Central Belarusian Military Rada, and its members were arrested and tried by the revolutionary tribunal.

At the same time, on December 4–5, the CBWR's second plenary meeting was held, and student Tomasz Gryb was elected as a deputy instead of D. Mamońka.

On December 5, delegates from Minsk, Mogilev, Vitebsk, Smolensk, and Hrodna provinces gathered in Minsk. At the same congress, the two largest competing national organizations, the Great Belarusian Rada (GBR) and the Belarusian Regional Committee (BRC), which represented Belarus' eastern provinces, were present. The BRC's activists tried to take the management of the Belarusian national movement out of the GBR's hands as most of them were members of the Socialist Revolutionary Party. Initially, the BRC planned to convene its all-Belarusian Congress on December 15 in Rogachev in Mogilev province, for which they received permission from Vladimir Lenin and Joseph Stalin.

Seeing that the UBD managed to hold a congress in Minsk, the BRC agreed to merge the two congresses. However, they did not give up their congress in Rogachev on December 15, which they hoped to manage themselves. The UBR agreed to participate in the congress in Rogachev because the BRC enjoyed the support of Moscow and the Belarusian peasantry, which the UBR did not. Ultimately, the congress in Rogachev led to the breakup of the united national movement.

Despite the agreement between the BWR and the BRC to hold the congress jointly, some pro-Russian delegates opposed the congress in Minsk, at which time the CBR threatened them with arrest. The congress proclaimed the right of Belarusians to create a national state, but its participants were clearly divided over the political views of the West and the East: the former, represented by the BSS, were in favour of the independence of Belarus, the latter, represented by the BRC, saw Belarus only as part of Russia. Thanks to the threats of the CBDN, the congress was opened on December 14.

The military played an important role at the congress, as more than half of its delegates were military men. Initially, the head of the Central Belarusian Military Rada Symon Rak-Michajłoŭski was elected chairman of the congress but within a few days, due to internal struggles, he was replaced by Yan Sereda, another member of the Central Belarusian Military Rada.

At the same time when this congress was held, numerous other congresses of the Belarusian military were taking place as well. At the end of November there was a congress of the 3rd Corps of the Western Front, and on 1–4 December there was a congress of the 2nd Army in Nevel. On 3 December, a congress of Belarusians of the Romanian Front was held in Odessa. Between 15 and 20 December, a congress of soldiers of the Southwestern Front was held in Kyiv. In Smolensk a congress of Belarusian soldiers was held.

All congresses and meetings of Belarusian soldiers sent to the First All-Belarusian and to the Central Belarusian Military Council declarations supporting the autonomy of Belarus as a federative part of the Russian Republic; soldiers also sent demands for the creation of a Belarusian army.

The organisations of the Belarusian military in Mogilev province demanded that the Bolsheviks disband the Polish units being formed. The executive committee of the Mogilev Soviet of Workers' and Soldiers' Deputies appealed to the Supreme Commander-in-Chief with a proposal to start the formation of the Belarusian army from demobilised Belarusians using the Central Military District and the Stavka of the Supreme Commander. The 4th Congress of Peasant Deputies of Mogilev province also demanded the Bolsheviks withdraw Polish units from Belarus, threatening that in case of failure to fulfil this demand Belarusian units would arrive in the province.

Faced with the reluctance to form and the hostile attitude of the Western Front leadership to the Belarusian units being formed, the process of forming Belarusian units continued without the participation of official structures. In the Pskov area, Lieutenant Ezovitov began to form a Belarusian lancer regiment. After its creation, the regiment was transferred to Belorussia to the town of Krasna near Orsha under the name of the Belorussian Cavalry Regiment. This large formation was commanded by Captain R. Yakubenya. In Smolensk a district congress of Belorussian soldiers, the statement wrote:

Decided to create the 1st Smolensk Belorussian Regiment by replenishing it with Belarusians from the 377th Vitebsk Druzhina. The formation of the Belarusian Battalion began in Odessa from the Belarusians of the Odessa Military District.

Numerous Belarusian military units that were created on different fronts tried to contact General Kyprian Kandratovich, who was in charge of the formation of the Belarusian army, but the attempts were fruitless. The soldiers received support, advice and instructions only from the junior officers of the CBWR and the leadership of its political department. The patience of the junior officers burst when Kandratovich tore up a letter that had been brought to him for signature. In the end, the members of the presidium of the CBWR declared that they would leave the military department if it was headed by Kandratovich. The executive committee of the CCER dismissed General Kandratovich from the leadership and Colonel Konstantin Ezovitov was appointed instead.

At this time, the Bolshevik protégé Nikolai Krylenko, who had been appointed commander-in-chief, issued an order banning the creation of national units and forbidding the convening of national congresses in the front zone. This order was directed primarily at Ukrainians and Poles, but the commander of the Western Front Myasnikov also used it against Belarusians and on December 8 issued an order to liquidate the 1st Belorussian Regiment, which was in Minsk, and to include the regiment's men in the 289th Reserve Regiment. The CBRN agreed to fulfil the order and integrate the fighters into the 289th Regiment, expecting to receive supplies and weapons. After that, the CBRF sent the arriving Belarusian volunteers to the 289th Regiment, hoping to take it under its command.

Krylenko's order provoked a sharp protest from the Belorussian Military Rada of the 12th Army of the Northern Front (chairman Makarevich); on December 9 he sent a telegram to Krylenko demanding he resume the creation of Belorussian military units. The 12th Army had already worked on the "Belorussianisation" of several units. The BIA ordered its commissars to continue the "Belarusisation", despite the actions of the Russians. Because of this, some commissars were arrested for a short time.

On December 11, there was a meeting of the military department of the First All-Belarusian Congress. P. Aleksiuk, taking advantage of the fact that most of the CBWR members participated in the meeting, made a proposal to turn the meeting into a session of the CBWR. At the meeting, chaired by P. Aliaksiuk, the demands for the creation of Belarusian military units and their transfer to Belarus were confirmed. The CBWR also demanded the cancellation of Krylenko's order banning the creation of Belarusian units and confirmed the right of Belarusians to form a national army. The CBWR ordered the formation of the 1st Belarusian Regiment in Minsk, and equalised all Belarusian military committees (the executive committee of the CBWR, the Front Committee, the Army Committee, etc.) with the Russian military committees.

In the meantime, the Bolshevik leadership of the Western Region and the Western Front decided to deal with all the Belarusian organisations in one fell swoop: on the night of December 17–18, the Bolsheviks broke up the First All-Belarusian Congress, and arrested members of the presidium and several deputies. Simultaneously, the Bolsheviks expelled all Belarusian organizations from the Governor's House. In response, the executive committee of the Central Committee occupied the building on Militsiya Street, where the Belarusian organizations relocated. Additionally, the Belarusian executive committee of the Western Front moved to the building on Kolomenskaya Street.

The dispersal of the First All-Belarusian Congress, the decisions of which became a political reference point in the further development of the Belarusian national movement, had many consequences. One of them was the creation of the congress council, headed by the leader of the nationalist wing of the BSG T. Hryb, on December 18, 1917 at a meeting between activists and part of the presidium of the congress of the executive committee. At the December 18 meeting, held at a railway depot of the Libava-Romna railway, the council decided:

1. considers the All-Belarusian Congress forcibly dispersed;
2. the congress council shall be recognised as the executive body of the congress, whose duty is to implement all decisions and resolutions of the congress;
3. supplement the congress council with delegates from fellow countrymen and other groups who send their representatives from the congress to the council and give them the right of recusal, recall.

K. Lander and Myachnikov arrived at the meeting and demanded that those gathered leave the room, but they were opposed by the railway workers who harassed them and threatened to kill them.

А. Myasnikov and K. Lander organised a victory parade in Minsk on December 20, but they did not take further action as it exceeded their authority. The central authorities were flooded with protests from Belarusian organisations, and protest meetings were held in Minsk, Mogilev, Vitibsk, Orsha, Polotsk, Igumen.

== Events ==
- First All-Belarusian Congress
- Dispersal of Belarusian organisations in Minsk
- Battle for Bobruisk
- Arrest of the Central Belarusian Military Council
- Battle of Bobruysk (1918)
- Vitebsk Uprising
- Polish-Belarusian Administration of Minsk

== Forces of the parties ==
=== Belarusian units ===
At the end of 1917, the CBRR started to form the Belarusian army, according to K. Dzhezovit it was to be called the Belarusian People's Red Guard, while A. Chochlov proposed to call the army the Belarusian People's Socialist Guard, its departments were to be in Minsk, Bobruisk, Rogachev, Mogilev, Borisov.

At the end of 1917 Belarusian units were established in Vitibsk, Smolensk, Orsha, Luninets, Odessa, as well as the 4th Belorussian Regiment on the Rumanian front.

- 1st Smolensk Belorussian Regiment - it was not realised.
- 1st Belorussian Regiment - created in Minsk, 350 soldiers guarded the 1st All-Belorussian Congress. On December 8 1917, by Myasnikov's decision it was included in the 289th Reserve Regiment (it was under the influence of the CBWR). At the end of 1917 it was transferred to the railway line Minsk-Vitebsk-Smolensk, in the beginning of 1918 it was disbanded due to lack of supply.
- Belorussian cavalry regiment - created near Pskov in early 1918 commander Yakubenya was based near Orsha.
- Minsk Belorussian Regiment was created in February 1918 in Minsk.
- 1st Hussar Belarusian National Regiment was created by Tarogin's order January 14 1918.
- 4th Byelorussian Corps - on January 21 1918 was created by D. Scherbachov's decree on the Rumanian front.
- 357th Vitebsk squad - by decree of January 23 1918.
- 401st Minsk squad - by decree of January 23 1918.

=== Polish national formations ===
In early 1918, units of the 1st Polish Corps under Józef Dowbor-Muśnicki fought victoriously against the Bolsheviks in Belarus. The corps' headquarters was Minsk. According to Łatyszonek roughly 40%-60% of the corps' soldiers were Belarusian Catholics from Vilna and Minsk provinces.

== See also ==
- List of states and regions involved in the Russian Civil War
- Bibliography of the Russian Revolution and Civil War
- Bibliography of the history of Belarus and Byelorussia
- Outline of the Russian Revolution and Civil War

== Literature ==
- Гісторыя Беларусі ад сярэдзіны XVIII ст. да пачатку ХХІ ст. / Алег Латышо-нак, Яўген Мірановіч. — 2-е выд. — Смаленск: Інбелкульт, 2013. — 368 с. ISBN 978-5-9904531-6-6
- "Октябрьский старт. Как Октябрьская революция повлияла на формирование белорусской государственности". 2017-11-03.
- Łatyszonek, O. Białoruskie formacje wojskowe 1917—1923 / O. Łatyszonek. — Białystok : Białoruskie Towarzystwo Historyczne, 1995. — 273 с.
- Турук Ф. Белорусское движение . Москва. 1921 год (репринтное издание 1994 года). 145 стр. Язык: Рус.
- История создания армии БНР. Как 100 лет назад наши солдаты дрались с большевиками за беларуские города
- ПЕРВЫЙ ВСЕБЕЛОРУССКИЙ СЪЕЗД (ДЕКАБРЬ 1917 г.): К СТОЛЕТИЮ
