= Paluta Badunova =

Belarusian politician

Paluta Aliaksandraŭna Badunova
- Палута Аляксандраўна Бадунова
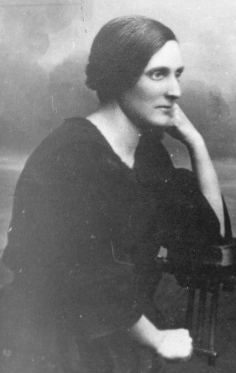
- Badunova in 1923

Member of the government of the Belarusian Democratic Republic

Personal details
- Born: 7 September 1885 Homiel, Russian Empire (now Belarus)
- Died: 29 November 1938 (aged 53) Minsk, Byelorussian SSR, Soviet Union (now Belarus)
- Party: Belarusian Socialist Assembly; Socialist-Revolutionary Party
- Profession: Politician

Paluta Aliaksandraŭna Badunova (Belarusian: Палу́та Алякса́ндраўна Бадуно́ва, Russian: Полу́та Алекса́ндровна Бодуно́ва ; 7 September 1885 – 29 November 1938) was a key female political figure in the Belarusian independence movement of the early 20th century. She was the only woman at the Rada of the Belarusian Democratic Republic, and later became a victim of Soviet repressions in Belarus.

== Early years ==
Badunova was born in the town of Navabelitsa (now one of the districts of Gomel). Her father, Alexander Vosipavich, rented a small estate, which was the main income of the family, and raised seven children - two sons and five daughters. She graduated from a two-grade school in Buynichy, near Mogilev, after which she passed the exams for the title of home teacher of Russian language and geography. In 1905, she started working in the schools of the Gomel district. In 1914-1917, she studied at higher historical and literary courses in Petrograd, studying literature, history and geography.

== Revolutionary and nationalist activities ==
She was elected to the Petrograd Council of Workers' and Soldiers' Deputies as a student. It was probably there that she met deputy Zmicier Zhylunovich and (perhaps under his influence) joined the Belarusian Socialist Assembly (BSG). In June 1917, she was elected a member of the Central Committee of the BSG. In July, the newspaper "Volnaya Belarus" reported on her trip to Buda-Kashalev and Gomel, where she conducted party work. From August 5, 1917, she was a member of the audit commission of the Central Council of Belarusian organizations in Minsk. In August 1917, Badunova was among the founders of the Belarusian Teachers' Union. For a certain time (until March 3, 1918), she directed Belarusian school No. 20. She also took part in the work of the First All-Belarusian Congress.

On February 21, 1918, she joined the People's Secretariat of the BNR, becoming the People's Secretary of Guardianship in the first Government of Belarus. As People's Secretary, she signed the Act of March 25. After the representatives of the BNR (Y. Lesik, Jazep Varonka, Raman Skirmunt, etc.) sent a telegram to Wilhelm II, Badunov was recalled from the post of People's Secretary by the left wing of the Society. On May 1, 1918, together with Tamaš Hryb, she announced the creation of a separate faction of Socialist Revolutionaries within the Council of the Belarusian People's Republic and thus became a co-founder of the Belarusian Party of Socialist Revolutionaries (BPSR), the secretary of the party's Central Committee. On the same day, she joined the Council's Refugee Commission, and in August she became the chairman of the National Unity Commission. She participated in the opening of Belarusian children's shelters and schools and served as Chairman of the Belarusian women's charitable society Tsyotka, organized in Minsk on May 4, 1918.

On November 12, 1919, she was elected deputy chairman of the People's Council of the BNR. The Socialist-Revolutionaries embarked on the path of armed struggle in alliance with the Bolsheviks against the Polish occupiers. On November 20, 1919, Badunova spoke out against the cabinet of Anton Luckievič. On December 13, at the organizational meeting, she read a declaration that the Council of the BNR is severing ties with the bourgeoisie, overthrowing the bourgeois government, creating a new, revolutionary one headed by Vaclau Lastouski, and going underground. At this meeting, she was elected deputy chairman of the Council of the BNR.

The Poles immediately began arresting SRs (including Lastouski and Jazep Mamońka), but they captured Badunova only in February 1920. She was kept in prison for a short time. Once free, she crossed the Berezina and headed to Smolensk. Not finding a common language with the leadership of the Bolsheviks of Lithuania and Belarus, she went to Moscow. In April 1920, as a representative of the BPSR, she conducted negotiations with the Central Committee of the RCP(b) in Moscow.

At the end of May 1920, Badunova reported on her trip to Moscow to the Presidium of the Council of the BNR and the Council of Ministers in Riga. On May 31, 1920, she signed the resolutions of the conference of BPSR members on confidence in the policy of the cabinet of Lastouski and the Minister of Foreign Affairs of the BNR, Ya. Ladnov. In those days, she took part in the work of the organizational bureau for convening the State Assembly in Riga and in the conference of Belarusian state and public figures. Badunov and Y. Belevich tried to join the Extraordinary Mission of the BNR to Moscow, which was headed by Vasil Zacharka, but the Moscow government did not grant them accreditation. In addition, Badunova's health was significantly undermined by tuberculosis she had contracted during her imprisonment by the Poles, and she had to undergo a course of treatment at a resort on the Riga coast.

Badunova returned to Minsk by November 6, 1920. She joined the work of the Socialist-Revolutionary Belarusian Workers' Club. At the congress of the BSSR on December 25, 1920, it defended the political line of maneuvering towards the Soviet government, considering it possible to transform the BSSR into a sovereign national state. The delegates elected Badunova a member of the Central Committee of the BPSR.

On the night of February 16–17, 1921, before the conclusion of the Treaty of Riga, during the campaign for the forced "liquidation of the BPSR", Badunova was arrested, together with other members of the party, by the Bolsheviks. She, the head of the right wing of the SR party, was accused of having connections with underground organizations in the Vitebsk, Smolensk and Gomel governorates, as well as with organizations on the other side of the Soviet-Polish front. During her stay under arrest, her health deteriorated significantly. On August 16, 1921, she was released.

== Life in exile and return ==
On New Year's Eve 1923, she illegally crossed the Polish border and went to Vilnius. About a month later, she was arrested by the Polish gendarmerie in order to find out her identity and return to the USSR. Only in August, she was released from arrest with a demand to immediately leave the territory of Poland. But before leaving Poland, Badunova managed to meet and speak before the figures of the Belarusian national movement in Vilnius, Danzig, miraculously avoiding detention.

In 1923-1925 she lived in Prague. During this period she entered the Ukrainian Higher Pedagogical Institute, since renamed after Mykhailo Drahomanov, but was unable to complete her studies due to poor health and frequent illnesses.

Badunova was shaken by the news of the liquidation of the BPSR, by decision of the party congress, which took place in Minsk in October 1924. She began to suffer neuropsychiatric diseases.

A supporter of Lastouski, she opposed the cabinet of A. Tsvikevich. Together with Momonka on October 14, 1923, she demanded to convene the Presidium of the Council of the BNR and resolve the issue of the government, but P. Pyotra Krecheuski and Zakharka did not agree to that. Badunova, Hryb, Badunova and Mamonka then published the "Announcement" of the Bureau of the Central Committee of the Party of Socialist Revolutionaries that the government of the BNR and the Rada do not exist. This document caused a negative reaction among the SRs.

In 1923, the government of the BSSR announced an amnesty to the members of the Belarusian movement who did not fight with weapons in their hands. All this was accompanied by the policy of Belarusianization, the expansion of the territory of the BSSR, and the transition to the NEP. Once again trusting the Bolsheviks, somewhere in the middle of 1925 emigrants began to return en masse. In January 1925, Badunova returned to the BSSR. For the next five years, she lived with her sister Maria in Minsk, trying to establish cooperation with the Institute of Belarusian Culture.

== Repression and death ==
The first wave of repression against the Belarusian intelligentsia, which began in 1930, did not affect Badunova, perhaps because of her health. In 1930, she returned to Homiel. She worked as a teacher at a school in Novobelitsa and taught Belarusian studies courses in Homiel. She lived on the support of her brother Alexander. Finding herself in a difficult situation, Badunova wanted to leave the USSR in 1932, but she was not given permission.

In the summer of 1937, a new wave of repression began. On September 3, 1937, Badunova was arrested. On November 30, 1937, the "special troika" of the NKU of the BSSR sentenced her to ten years in labor camps. Badunova was blamed for the fact that she, together with other former SRs, headed the underground Central Committee of the BPSR. On May 25, 1938, a special meeting of the NKVD sentenced her to capital punishment. She was shot on November 29, 1938 in Minsk. Her burial location is unknown.

== Rehabilitation ==
Badunova was rehabilitated on June 21, 1989 according to the decision of the Presidium of the Supreme Soviet of the USSR during Mikhail Gorbachev's Perestroika in June 1989 due to the absence of a crime. However, despite petitions by activists to name a street in Homiel after her, there is no place of her commemoration in present-day Belarus.

== Movie ==
In 2012, a documentary film about Badunova "Paluta Badunova - remember and not forget" was shot, directed by Valery Mazynskyi. The idea to make a film belongs to the Hamelchuks, in particular to the journalist and historian Larisa Shchiryakova. She began filming it herself according to Valentina Lebedeva's book, and then they turned to Valery Mazinsky. Shchiryakova, a member of the Belarusian Association of Journalists from Homiel, played the main role. Social activists from Homiel also starred in the film.

The Czech episode from Badunova's life was filmed in the Czech Republic - in the middle of the Czech Republic, in Mysliborytsy, in the old castle. Filming also took place at Charles University. The premiere of the film took place in the autumn of 2012 on the TV channel "Belsat".

== Family ==
Anatoly Sidorevich has written that Badunova was in love with her fellow party member Tamaš Hryb and, despite not being his wife, sometimes identified herself as Badunova-Hryb. She had no children.
