= Hryb =

Hryb is a surname. Notable people with the surname include:

- J.C. Hryb (born 1968), French-born American interior designer
- Larry Hryb, Microsoft employee
- Myechyslaw Hryb (born 1938), Belarusian politician and President of Belarus
- Tamaš Hryb (1895–1938), Belarusian politician, journalist, and writer
- Taras Hryb (1952–2021), Canadian wrestler
- Uladzislau Hryb (born 1997), Belarusian para-athlete
