= Rada of the Belarusian Democratic Republic =

Belarusian government-in-exile

Rada of the Belarusian People's Republic Рада Беларускай Народнай Рэспублікі Rada Biełaruskaj Narodnaj Respubliki
- Coat of arms of the Belarusian Democratic Republic as used by the BNR Rada

- Flag of the Belarusian Democratic Republic

Type
- Type: Council

Leadership
- President: Ivonka Survilla since 1997

Meeting place
- Facilities of Belarusian diaspora in North America, Britain and other countries

Website
- http://www.radabnr.org

The Rada of the Belarusian People's Republic (Belarusian: Рада Беларускай Народнай Рэспублікі, romanized: Rada Biełaruskaj Narodnaj Respubliki, Рада БНР, Rada BNR) was the main representative body of the Belarusian People's Republic (BPR), centered in Minsk. It was established in March 1918, when the Rada of the All-Belarusian Congress (Belarusian: Рада Усебеларускага з’езда) was expanded and transformed into the temporary legislative body of the newly proclaimed BPR. Already on 25 March, the Rada adopted the Third Constituent Charter, proclaiming independence of BPR, and also appealing for international recognition. Since those events occurred during the early stages of German occupation of Belarus, that lasted from February to December 1918, the scope of Rada's authority was limited. During the Soviet westward offensive at the end of 1918, the Rada was moved from Minsk to Grodno.

Since 1919, the Rada of BNR has been in exile where it has preserved its existence among the Belarusian diaspora, as an advocacy group promoting support to Belarusian independence and democracy in Belarus among Western policymakers. As of 2026, the Rada BNR is the oldest existing government in exile.

== Formation ==
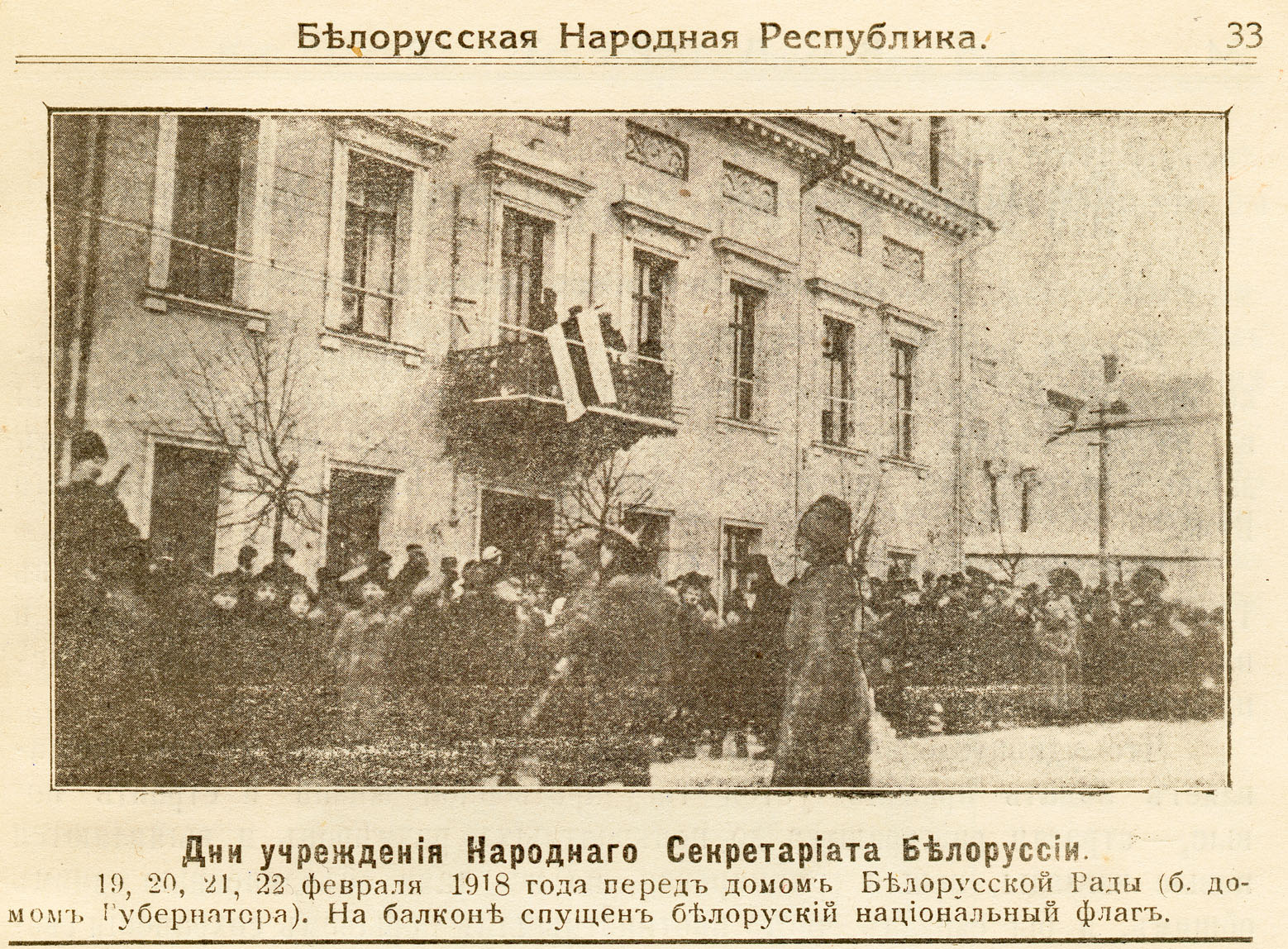
The Belarusian national flag on the building of the Rada BNR in Minsk, 1918

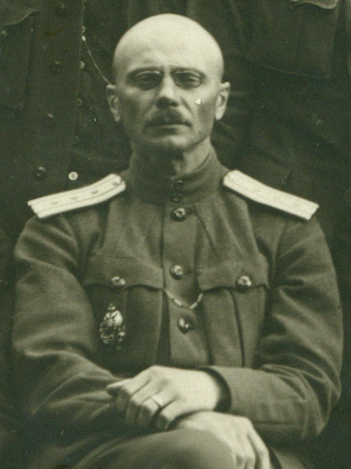
Jan Sierada, the first President of the Rada of the Belarusian Democratic Republic (March-May 1918)

The Rada of BNR was established in March 1918, upon expansion and transformation of the initial Rada of the All-Belarusian Congress, that was founded on 31 December (O.S. 18 December) 1918 in Minsk, by a group of prominent delegates of the First All-Belarusian Congress, who met in secret, since the Congress was previously dispersed by violent intervention of local Bolshevik authorities of the Western Oblast. At that time, the Bolshevik Government in Petrograd was not ready to grant autonomy to Belarus, and thus the Rada and its Executive Council (Belarusian: Выканаўчы камітэт Рады Усебеларускага з’езда) continued to operate in secret.

After the German invasion of Belarus in February 1918, Bolsheviks authorities retreated from Minsk, while leaders of the Rada remained in the city and proceeded to establish provisional institutions that would represent Belarus and its people. After the Bolsheviks and the Germans had signed the Treaty of Brest-Litovsk (3 March 1918) the Rada declared independence of Belarus as the sovereign Belarusian Democratic Republic (25 March 1918).

As of 25 March 1918 the Rada BNR had 77 members including:

- 36 elected at the All-Belarusian Congress
- 6 representatives of the Belarusian community of Vilnius
- 15 representatives of ethnic minorities (Russian, Polish, Jewish)
- 10 representatives of local authorities
- 10 representatives of major cities

In order to secure institutional consolidation and international recognition, the Rada decided on the same day (25 March) to issue an appeal to the German Emperor, stating:

The Rada of the Belorussian People’s Republic, as the regular representation of the Belorussian people, expresses its deepest gratitude to Your Imperial Majesty for the liberation of Belorussia by the German Army from the unbearable yoke of foreign anarchy and oppression. The Rada has declared the independence of the whole and indivisible Belorussia, and entreats your Imperial Majesty for assistance in its task of strengthening the independence of the State and indivisibility of the country in union with the German Empire. Only under the protection of the German Empire can our country anticipate happiness in the future.

This appeal triggered a severe political crisis in the Rada of the Belarusian Democratic Republic, as not all members of the Rada supported such close cooperation with Germany. Vincent Hadleŭski emphasized that the appeal was a mistake, a consequence of the difficult situation in which the Belarusian people found themselves at the time. The telegram was also criticized by Symon Rak-Michajłoŭski. Paluta Badunova and Tamaš Hryb withdrew from the People’s Secretariat of the Belarusian Democratic Republic in protest against the sending of the telegram and formed the Belarusian Socialist-Revolutionary Party.

German Government did not give official recognition to Belarus and hindered the activities of the institutions of the Belarusian Democratic Republic. Nevertheless, the Rada managed to start organising its governing bodies in different parts of the country as well as working on establishing a national Belarusian army and a national education system.

The Rada established official diplomatic contacts with several states including Finland, the Ukrainian People's Republic, Czechoslovakia, the Baltic States, Turkey and others.

With the approach of Bolshevik armies to Minsk the Rada was forced to relocate to Vilnius, then to Hrodna and eventually, upon coordination with the Republic of Lithuania, to Kaunas.

== In exile ==
=== 1919–1947 ===
In April 1919, the Polish army seized Hrodna and Vilnius. Jozef Pilsudski issued the Proclamation to the inhabitants of the former Grand Duchy of Lithuania stating that the new Polish administration would grant them cultural and political autonomy. The proclamation was welcomed by the Belarusian leadership, especially considering Soviet plans for the Sovietization of Belarus. However, in later negotiations with the Belarusian leaders Pilsudski proposed to limit the Belarusian government's functions to purely cultural issues, which was rejected by the Belarusian prime minister Anton Luckievic. The government of Belarus managed to include a statement for minorities' rights in Poland in the resolutions of the Paris Peace Conference.

The government of the Belarusian Democratic Republic protested the Polish military mobilization in the area of Vilnius, the Polish elections held there, and the annexation of the Augustów area to Poland. They also appealed to the League of Nations, Great Britain, France, the United States and other countries to recognize the independence of Belarus.

In late 1920, the Belarusian government began negotiations anew with the Bolsheviks in Moscow and tried to persuade them to recognize the independence of Belarus and to release Belarusian political prisoners being held in Russian jails. The negotiations were unsuccessful.

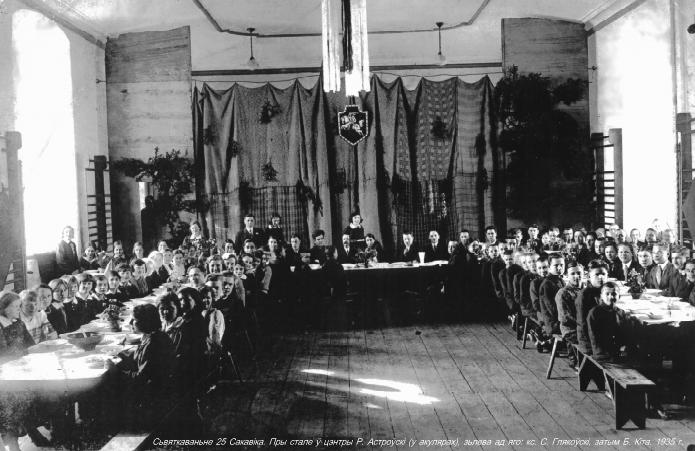
Celebration of an anniversary of the Belarusian Democratic Republic in the Belarusian Gymnasium of Vilnia, 1935.

On 11 November 1920, the Belarusian Democratic Republic signed a partnership treaty with the Republic of Lithuania to cooperate in liberating Belarusian and Lithuanian lands from Polish occupation.

After the establishment of the Belarusian Soviet Socialist Republic (Belarusian SSR) as part of the USSR, several members of the Rada laid down their mandates in 1925 and returned to Belarus. Officially the Rada BNR never recognized the Belarusian SSR. Most of the members of the Rada who returned to Belarus, including former Prime Minister Vaclau Lastouski, were later killed in the Soviet terror in Belarus in the 1930s.

From the beginning of the Second World War and the German occupation of Czechoslovakia the Rada cooperated with the Nazis in hopes to establish their own government. On 28 June 1941 the president of the Belarusian People's Republic in exile, Vasil Zacharka telegraphed to Hitler, that he wishes him a quick and decisive victory over the Judeo-Bolshevik regime on all fronts. When it became clear that the Germans were not ready to create a Belarusian government, and Belarusians were given the place of executors of the orders of the German leadership, Vasil Zacharka stopped cooperating with the Germans and began to sharply criticize them in his articles. The Rada refused to recognize the puppet regime in German-occupied Belarus, the Belarusian Central Rada. At the same time, members of the Rada, namely Vasil Zacharka and Larysa Hienijuš, issued a document to the Jewish family Wolfsohn, which they passed off as Orthodox Belarusians, although they were aware that they were Jews. Because of this, the Wolfsohn family was able to survive the Second World War.

=== After the Second World War ===
The advance of the Red Army in 1945 forced the Rada of the BNR to relocate to the Western part of Germany, occupied by British and American troops.

In February 1948, the Rada passed a special manifesto, by which it declared its return to activity. In April 1948 the Rada, together with representatives of the Belarusian post-war refugees, held a conference in Osterhofen, Bavaria.

The primary activities of the Rada BNR in the West were lobbying and contacts with Western governments to ensure recognition of Belarus as a separate country. Together with other anti-Soviet organisations in the West, including governments in exile of Ukraine and the Baltic countries, the Rada protested against human rights violations in the Soviet Union. In the 1950s the Rada BNR enabled the creation of the Belarusian edition of Radio Free Europe. Members of the Rada organized support to Belarus following the Chernobyl accident of 1986.

=== After dissolution of the Soviet Union ===
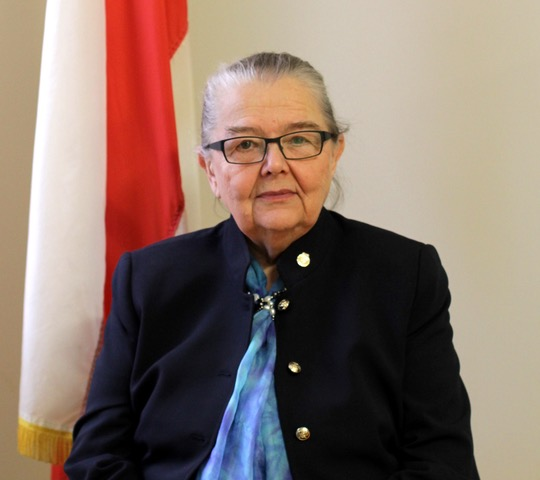
Ivonka Survilla, president of the Rada BNR as of May 2023

After the dissolution of the Soviet Union in the 1990s, similar governments-in-exile of the neighboring countries (Lithuania, Poland, Ukraine and others) handed back their mandates to the corresponding independent governments.

Upon declaration of independence of the Republic of Belarus in 1990, interest in the Belarusian Democratic Republic increased in Belarusian society. The Belarusian Popular Front, which was the main pro-Perestroika anti-Communist opposition party, called for the restoration of an independent Belarus, in the form of the Belarusian Democratic Republic, starting in the late 1980s. In 1991, the Belarusian parliament adopted the state symbols of the Belarusian Democratic Republic, the Pahonia and the White-red-white flag, as state symbols of the Republic of Belarus.

In 1993, the government of the Republic of Belarus held official celebrations of the 75th anniversary of the Belarusian Democratic Republic in Minsk. Members of the Rada BNR took part in the celebrations along with the senior political leaders of the Republic of Belarus. It was stated then that the Rada was not ready to return its mandate to the Supreme Council of Belarus, which had originally been elected under Soviet rule. The Rada was prepared to hand its mandate to a freely elected Belarusian parliament; however, these plans were cancelled after president Alexander Lukashenko, elected in 1994, established a return to Soviet policies in regards to Belarusian language and culture.

The Rada BNR continued its activities aimed at promoting democracy and independence for Belarus in the USA, Canada, the United Kingdom and Estonia. In the 2010s, the President of the Rada regularly held meetings with western policymakers and makes official statements criticizing the human rights violations and continuing Russification in Belarus. The Rada became a consolidating center for several exiled Belarusian opposition politicians.

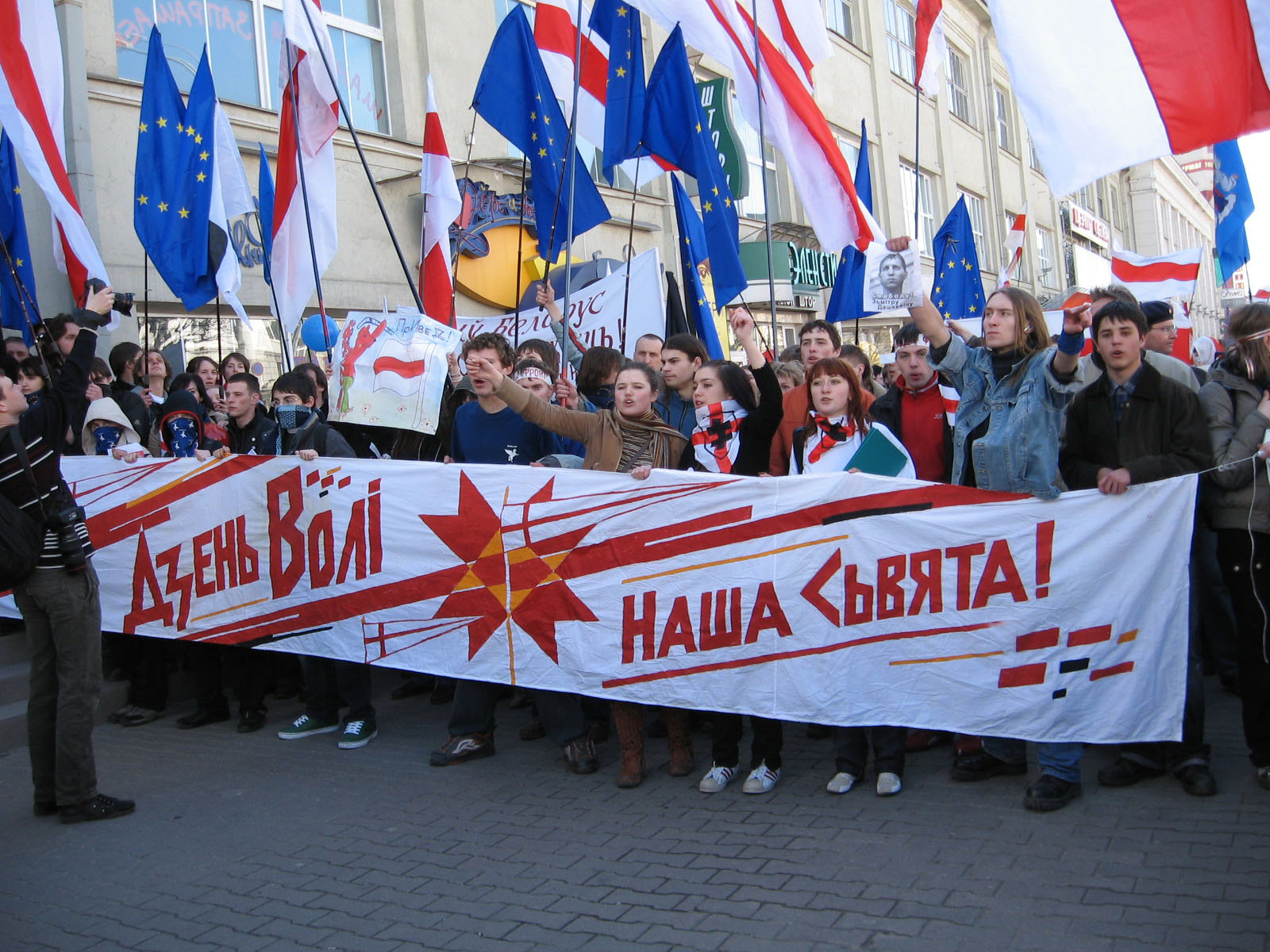
"Freedom Day" celebration rally held by the Belarusian opposition in 2007.

Since the late 1980s, 25 March, the Independence Day of the Belarusian Democratic Republic, is widely celebrated by the Belarusian national democratic opposition as Freedom Day (Belarusian: Дзень волі). It is usually accompanied by mass opposition rallies in Minsk and by celebration events of the Belarusian diaspora organizations supporting the Belarusian government in exile.

During the 2020–2021 Belarusian protests, the Rada of the Belarusian Democratic Republic expressed its support for the activities of Sviatlana Tsikhanouskaya and her office and declared her the "clear winner" of the 2020 presidential election.

In June 2023, it became known that the State Security Committee of the Republic of Belarus (KGB) declared the Rada an extremist formation.

== Structure and functions ==
The Rada was intended to be a provisional parliament which would perform its functions until a constitutional convention of Belarus was held. The Rada BNR formed a government consisting of its members.

As of 2017, the Rada sees itself as bearer of a symbolic mandate and as a guarantor of the independence of Belarus. The goal of the Rada is to transfer its mandate to a democratically elected Parliament of Belarus under the condition that no threat to the independence of Belarus should be present.

The Rada is led by the President of the Rada BNR (Старшыня Рады БНР) and a Presidium (Executive council) consisting of 14 members.

The Rada includes several Secretariates as working groups or individual secretaries responsible for specific areas, this include among others:

- Secretariate for External Affairs
- Secretariate for Internal Affairs
- Secretariate for Information
- Secretariate for Education

The activity of the Rada BNR is regulated by the Provisional Constitution of the Belarusian People's Republic and the Statute of the Rada BNR.

== Presidents of the Rada BNR ==
- Janka Sierada (9 March – 14 May 1918)
- Jazep Losik (14 May 1918 – 13 December 1919)
- Piotra Krečeŭski (13 December 1919 – 1928)
- Vasil Zacharka (1928–1943)
- Mikoła Abramčyk (1943–1970)
- Vincent Žuk-Hryskievič (1970–1980)
- Jazep Sažyč (1980–1997)
- Ivonka Survilla (since 1997)

== Presidium ==
The current (April 2024) presidium consists of:

- Ivonka Survilla – President
- Siarhiej Navumčyk, former member of the Supreme Soviet of Belarus and the Belarusian Popular Front – 1st Vice-President
- Viačasłau Stankievič, Belarusan-American Association
- Mikoła Pačkajeŭ, Association of Belarusians in Great Britain, former senior activist of the Belarusian Popular Front and Malady Front – Vice-President
- Palina Prysmakova, Board Member of the Belarusian Institute of America and the Krecheuski Foundation, Associate Professor of the School of Public Administration at Florida Atlantic University - Secretary
- Valer Dvornik – Treasurer
- Ała Orsa Romano, president of the Orsa Romano Foundation – Secretary of Education
- Valancina Tryhubovič, Belarusan-American Association – Archivist
- Alaksandar Starykievič
- Alaksandar Kot
- Pavał Šaŭcoŭ, Association of Belarusians in Great Britain
- Uladzislau Yandzyuk

== Awards and decorations of the Rada of the Belarusian Democratic Republic ==
In 1949, the Rada of the Belarusian Democratic Republic in exile under President Mikola Abramchyk introduced a number of civic and military awards. There has been a number of decorations in the 1950s.

In 2016, the Rada of the BDR announced plans to renew the decorations. In 2018, the Rada awarded 130 Belarusian activists and politicians, as well as a number of foreigners, with a newly created medal commemorating the 100th anniversary of the Belarusian Democratic Republic.

Image	Name	Creation Date	Description
	Order of the Pahonia; Ордэр Пагоні	1 September 1949	The highest state award of the Belarusian Democratic Republic
	Order of the Iron Knight; Ордэр Жалезнага Рыцара	1 September 1949	A military decoration for soldiers and officers
Brown, red, green	Partisan Medal; Мэдаль Партызана	1 September 1949	A medal for the members of the Belarusian anti-Soviet partisan movement
	Belarusian Democratic Republic 100th Jubilee Medal; Мэдаль да стагодзьдзя Беларускай Народнай Рэспублікі	24 December 2018	A medal "for lifelong achievements in the fulfillment of the ideals of the Belarusian Democratic Republic, including research and the popularisation of Belarus, the strengthening of and achievement of the independence of Belarus, and the struggle for freedom and democracy in Belarus."
	Military Virtue Medal; Мэдаль за баявыя заслугі	21 January 2023	A medal "for personal bravery shown in circumstances involving risk to life and the protection of freedom, independence and the democratic constitutional order of Belarus on the basis of the ideals of the Belarusian Democratic Republic, in particular, while conducting military and official duties, in battle and while conducting special tasks in the national interests of Belarus."

== Notable members ==
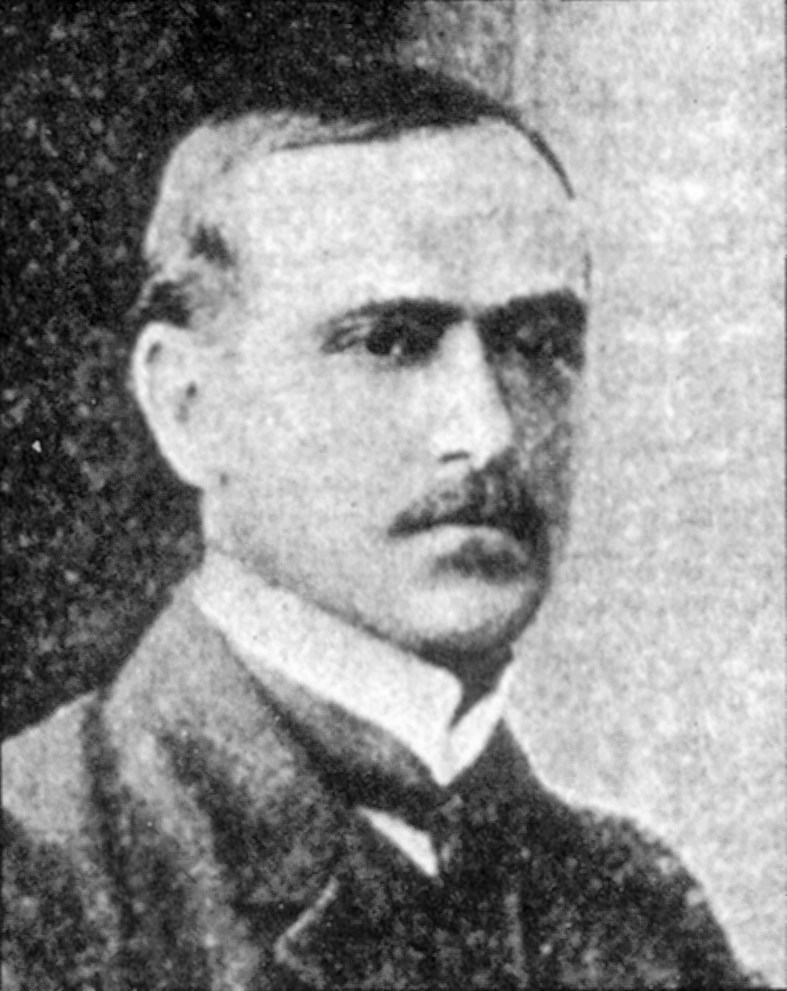
Raman Skirmunt

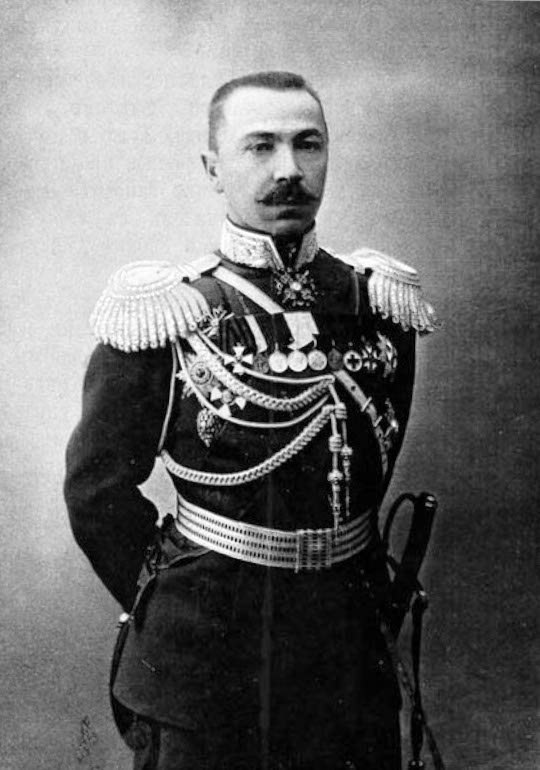
Gen. Kipryjan Kandratovič

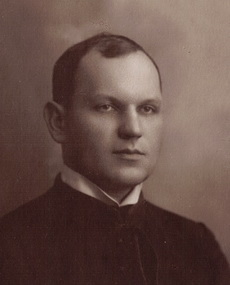
Fr. Vincent Hadleŭski

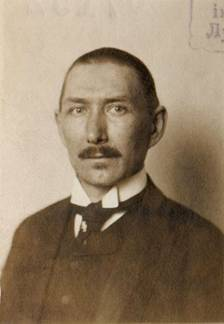
Ivan Luckievič

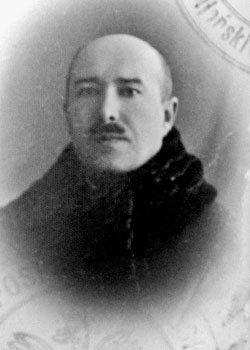
Anton Luckievič

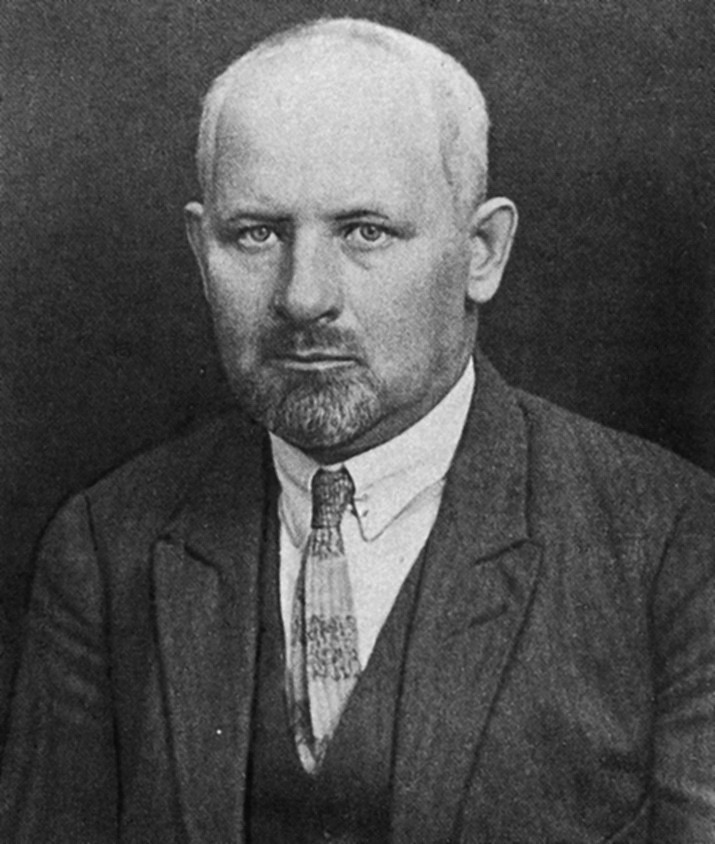
Vacłaŭ Łastoŭski

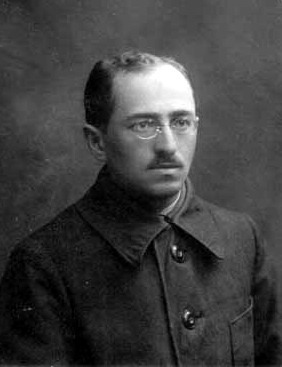
Branisłaŭ Taraškievič

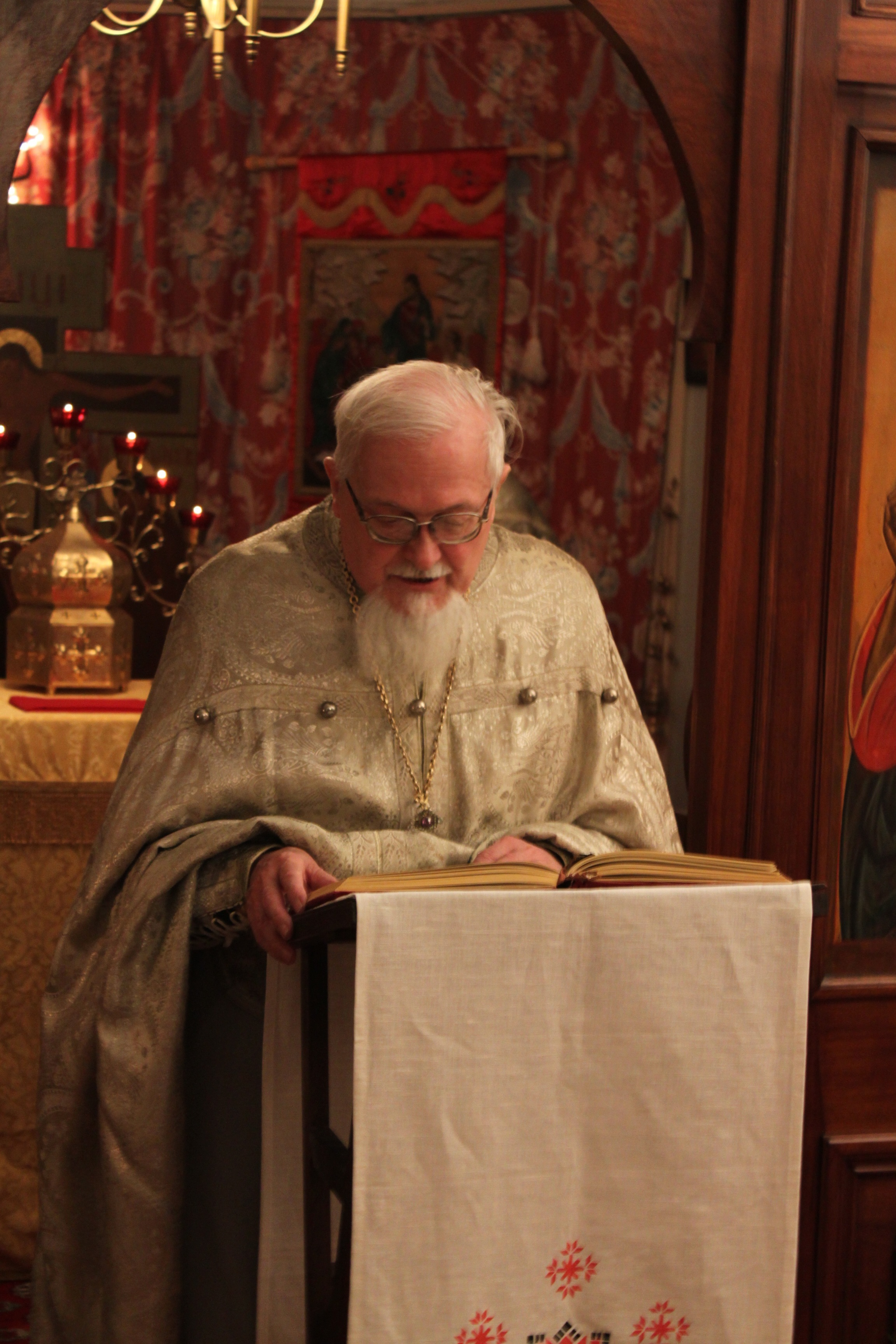
Fr. Alexander Nadson
- Anton Adamovič
- Paluta Badunova
- Janka Filistovič
- Larysa Hienijuš
- Vaclaŭ Ivanoŭski
- Kastuś Jezavitaŭ
- Jazep Mamońka
- Michaś Naŭmovič
- Mikola Ravienski
- Symon Rak-Michajłoŭski
- Lavon Rydleŭski
- Arkadź Smolič
- Jan Stankievič
- Zośka Vieras
- Jan Zaprudnik
- Raisa Žuk-Hryškievič

== See also ==
- History of Belarus
- Western Oblast (1917–1918)
- German occupation of Byelorussia during World War I
- Soviet westward offensive of 1918–1919
- Council of Lithuania
- Estonian government-in-exile
- Latvian diplomatic service
- National Anti-Crisis Management
- United Transitional Cabinet

== Sources ==
- Kasmach, Lizaveta (2023). Belarusian Nation-Building in Times of War and Revolution. Budapest: Central European University Press.
- Stone, Norman (1998) [1975]. The Eastern Front, 1914–1917. New York: Penguin Books.
- Sukiennicki, Wiktor (1965). "Stalin and Byelorussia's Independence". The Polish Review. 10 (4): 84–107.
- Sukiennicki, Wiktor (1984). East Central Europe During World War I: From Foreign Domination to National Independence. Boulder: East European Monographs.
