= Vacłaŭ Ivanoŭski =

Belarusian independence activist and politician (1880–1943)

- Вацлаў Іваноўскі
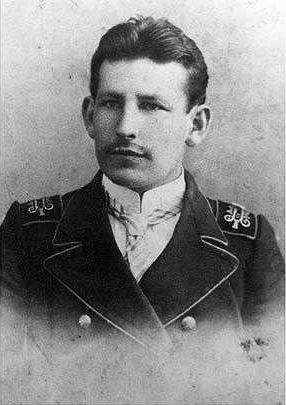

Mayor of Minsk (German-installed)
- In office 17 November 1941 – 6 December 1943; Disputed with Kanstancin Budaryn
- Preceded by: Vitaŭt Tumaš
- Succeeded by: Kanstancin Budaryn

Minister of Education of the Belarusian Democratic Republic
- In office November 11, 1918 – December 13, 1919

Personal details
- Born: 25 May 1880 Liabiodka estate, Vilna Governorate, Russian Empire (now Belarus)
- Died: 7 December 1943 (aged 63) Minsk, Reichskommissariat Ostland, Nazi Germany (now Belarus)
- Resting place: Kalvaryja cemetery, Minsk
- Party: Belarusian Socialist Assembly; Belarusian People's Self-Help
- Education: St. Petersburg Institute of Technology (1904); Technical University of Munich (doctorate, 1909); Imperial Technological Institute, St Petersburg
- Known for: Co-founder of the first Belarusian political party; founder of the first Belarusian publishing house

Vacłaŭ Leanardavič Ivanoŭski (Belarusian: Вацлаў Леанардавіч Іваноўскі, also known as Vatslaw Ivanowski or Wacław Iwanowski; 25 May 1880 – 7 December 1943) was a Belarusian political and public figure of the first half of the 20th century.

== Early years ==
Ivanoŭski was born into an upper middle class family on the Liabiodka estate in the Vilnius Governorate of the Russian Empire (now within the village of Halavičpolie, in Belarus' Grodno Region). One of his brothers was Tadas Ivanauskas.

In 1898 he graduated from the 5th Warsaw Gymnasium and entered the St. Petersburg Institute of Technology in the Department of Chemistry, which he finished in 1904. He went on to study abroad in Denmark and Germany. In 1909 he received a doctorate from the Technical University of Munich.

On return to the Russian Empire in 1910, he embarked upon a career in the area of microbiology and worked at the Ministry of Agriculture in St. Petersburg and the Vilnius Society of Agriculture.

== Involvement in the Belarusian independence movement ==
Apart from his career as a scientist, Ivanoŭski became actively involved with the fledgling Belarusian independence movement. While a student in St Petersburg, he became a founder of the Belarusian Revolutionary Party, headed the Society of Belarusian Public Education and Culture and was a member of the Central Committee of the Belarusian Socialist Assembly. He was engaged in publishing, setting up several Belarusian publishing houses, edited the first primer of the modern Belarusian language and collaborated with the first Belarusian newspapers "Nasha Dolya" and "Nasha Niva".

In 1917 Ivanoŭski participated in the First All-Belarusian Congress in Minsk and a year later became the Minister of Education in the Government of the Belarusian Democratic Republic. In February and March 1920, as a representative of the Rada of the Belarusian Democratic Republic, he participated in the Belarusian-Polish negotiations, sought to prevent the partition of Belarus between Poland and Soviet Russia and advocated the creation of a federation of Poland and Belarus.

== Later life ==
Between 1922 and 1939 Ivanoŭski was a professor at the Warsaw Polytechnic Institute. After the invasion of Poland by Nazi Germany in the autumn of 1939 he moved to Vilnia and taught at the local university.

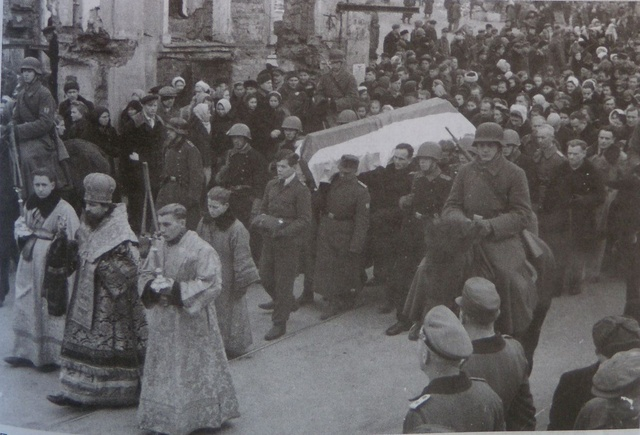
Funerals of Vaclaŭ Ivanoŭski

In the first months of the German occupation of Belarus, he moved to Minsk where he headed the Belarusian National Committee and in 1942 was appointed mayor by the German authorities - in which role "he did much to save people from German repression". In June 1943 German governor Wilhelm Kube set up a Council of Elders led by Ivanoŭski.

Ivanoŭski's wife Sabina and daughter Anna are awarded the title of "Righteous Among the Nations" for rescuing two Jewish women, Ivanoŭski's friends, in 1941 during the Nazi occupation.

== Death and burial ==
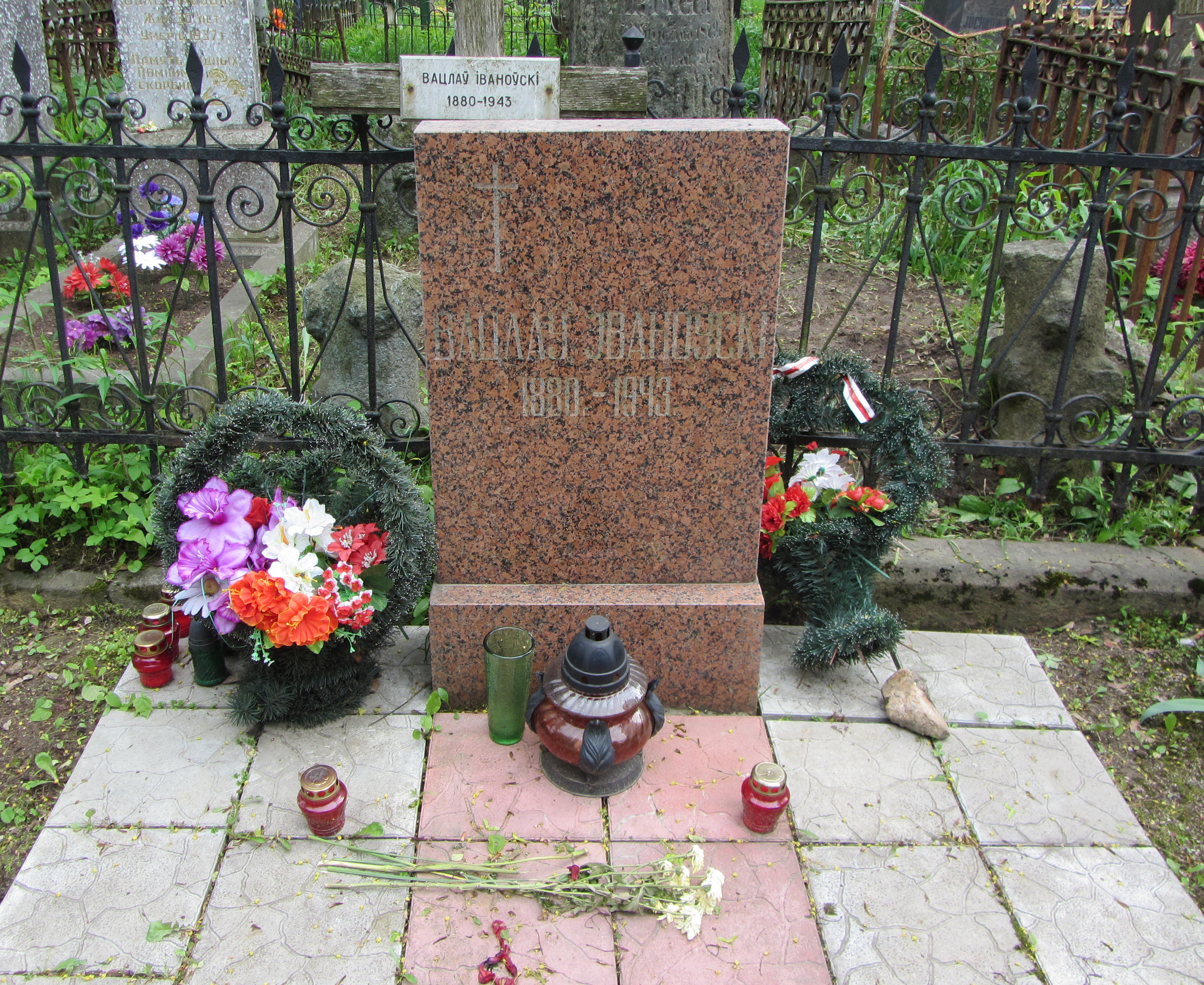
Tomb of Vaclaŭ Ivanoŭski

On 6 December 1943, Ivanoŭski was mortally wounded by unknown gunmen and died the following day. The identity of his assassins has never been definitively established.

He is buried in the Kalvaryja cemetery in Minsk, where in December 2006 a monument to Ivanoŭski was unveiled.
