= Tamaš Hryb =

Belarusian politician and writer

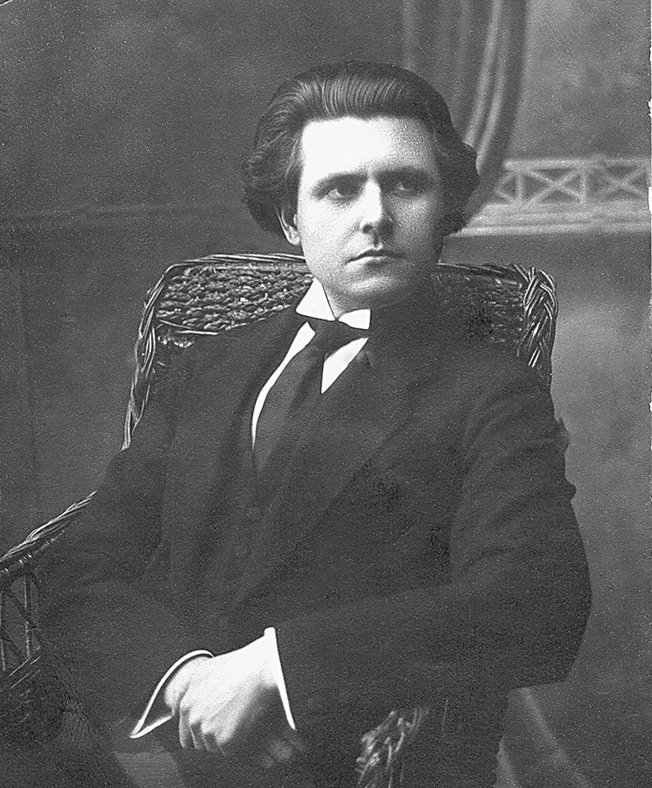

Interior Minister of the Belarusian Democratic Republic
- In office 13 December 1919 – 23 August 1923
- President: Piotra Krecheuski

Agriculture Minister of the Belarusian Democratic Republic
- In office 21 February 1918 – July 1918
- President: Jan Sierada

Personal details
- Born: March 19, 1895 Paliany, Wilno Governorate, Russian Empire (today Astravyets District, Hrodna Region, Belarus)
- Died: January 21, 1938 (aged 42) Prague, Czechoslovakia
- Resting place: Olšany Cemetery
- Education: St. Petersburg Psychoneurological Research Institute, Charles University

Tamaš Hryb (Belarusian: Тамаш Грыб, Tamash Hryb, 7 March 1895 — 21 January 1938) was a Belarusian politician, journalist and writer.

== Early life ==
Tamaš Hryb was born into a peasant family in the village of Paliany in what is now the border region of Belarus and the Republic of Lithuania.

After completing elementary education in local schools, he studied in St. Petersburg. He served in the Russian Navy, then went to study at the St. Petersburg Psychoneurological Research Institute.

As a student, he became an active member of Belarusian political groups in St. Petersburg. After the February Revolution, he became a full-time politician organising Belarusian soldiers and workers in the western part of the Russian Empire. Hryb became a notable political writer, ideologist and populariser of the Belarusian national liberation and an independent Belarusian state. He joined the Russian Communist Party (bolsheviks) and participated in the October Revolution.

== Statesman in the Belarusian Democratic Republic ==
In December 1917, Tamaš Hryb became one of the organisers of the First All-Belarusian Congress in Minsk. He was elected one of the secretaries of the Congress and became a member of the Executive Council of the Congress which eventually transformed into the Rada of the Belarusian Democratic Republic.

Hryb was one of the co-authors of the Constituent Charters of Belarus which proclaimed the Belarusian Democratic Republic and subsequently declared the independence of Belarus on 25 March 1918. Tamaš Hryb was a member of the first government of the republic and a diplomat.

Alongside Paluta Badunova and Jazep Mamońka, Hryb co-founded the Belarusian Party of Socialist Revolutionaries in 1918 and became its leader. For a short period of time in 1919, he published a Belarusian socialist newspapers: Hramadzianin (Belarusian: Грамадзянін, the Citizen ) in Wilno and Rodny kraj (Belarusian: Родны край, Native Land) in Hrodna . After six issues, the Rodny kraj newspaper was closed and its editor arrested by the occupying Polish authorities.

== Emigration ==
After 1921, Tamaš Hryb settled in Prague, where he received a Ph.D. in Philosophy from the Charles University in 1928. He founded and edited several periodicals dedicated to Belarusian studies and the Belarusian national liberation.

Tamaš Hryb founded and developed the Belarusian collection at the National Library of Czechoslovakia; he was also one of the co-founders and a long-time director of the Belarusian Archives in Prague.

Unlike some politicians of the Belarusian Democratic Republic, Hryb did not return to the Soviet Belarus in the 1920s and actively opposed the cooperation of the Belarusian national movement with the Soviets. Many of those who went back to Belarus or even just visited it, such as Francišak Aliachnovič and Branislaŭ Taraškievič, eventually became victims of Soviet repressions in Belarus.

Tamaš Hryb died in Prague on 21 January 1938 and was cremated on 25 January 1938. He was buried at the Olšany Cemetery in Prague.

== See also ==
- Belarusian Democratic Republic
- Vaclau Lastouski
