= Trudovoye Znamya =

Trudovoye Znamya (Russian: Трудовое Знамя) was a newspaper in Soviet Russia. It was the organ of the Western Oblast Committee of the Party of Left Socialist-Revolutionaries. Pavel Irov was the managing director of the newspaper.
