= Jazep Mamońka =

Belarusian politician

- Язэп Мамонька
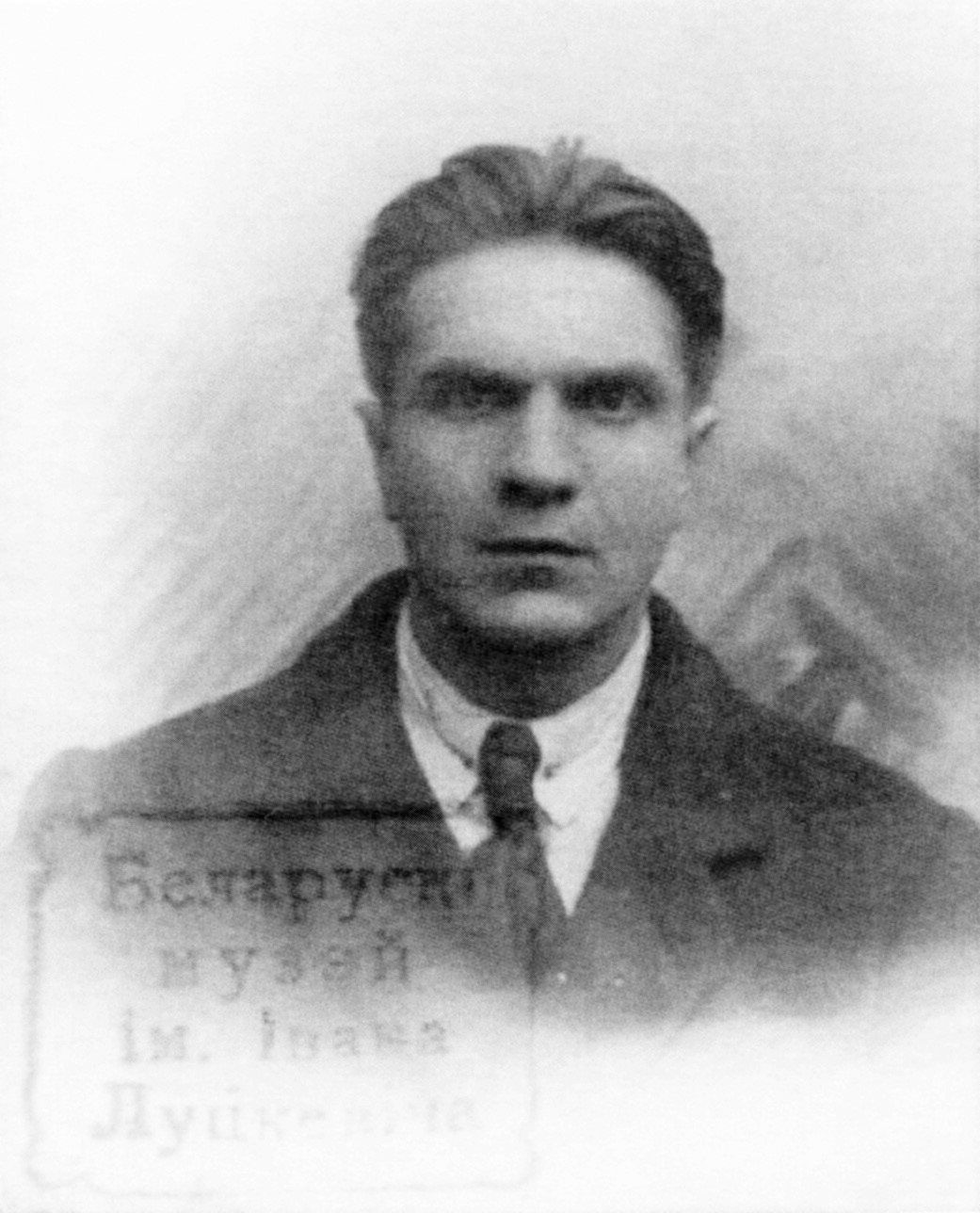
- Born: January 28, 1889; Zaliessie village in Minsk Governorate (now Slutsk District of Minsk region in Belarus
- Died: September 10, 1937 (aged 48); Sandarmokh forest massif in Russia’s Republic of Karelia
- Cause of death: executed
- Resting place: mass grave of Gulag victims in the Sandarmokh forest massif in Russia’s Republic of Karelia
- Occupation: politician
- Organization: Rada of the Belarusian Democratic Republic
- Political party: Party of Socialists-Revolutionaries; Belarusian Socialist Assembly (Hramada); Belarusian Party of Socialist Revolutionaries

Jazep Mamońka (Belarusian: Язэп Мамонька; 28 January 1889 – 10 September 1937) was а Belarusian politician and victim of Stalin’s purges.

== Early years ==
Mamońka was born in the village of Zaliessie in Minsk governorate of the Russian Empire (now Slucak district of Minsk region in Belarus).

From a young age he joined the revolutionary movement and in 1907–1917 was a member of the Party of Socialists-Revolutionaries. He was twice arrested by the tsarist authorities and spent nearly 3 years in prison.

During World War I, Mamońka served as a telegraph operator at the headquarters of the XII Russian Imperial Army.

== Involvement in the Belarusian independence movement ==
In May 1917 Mamońka founded an organisation of Belarusian soldiers in Riga. In September of that year he became a member of the Belarusian Socialist Assembly (Hramada) and later a member of the Central Committee of the party.

He was one of the organisers of the First All-Belarusian Congress and was elected to its Council.

In 1918 he was one of the founders, together with Paluta Badunova and Tamaš Hryb, of the Belarusian Party of Socialist Revolutionaries.

From December 1919 he was a member of the Presidium and held various important positions in the Rada of the Belarusian Democratic Republic.

== Exile, return and the Gulag ==
Between 1922 and 1928 Mamońka lived in exile in Czechoslovakia, Lithuania and Latvia but in September 1928 decided to return to Soviet Belarus. He was arrested at the border by the Joint State Political Directorate (OGPU) and later sentenced to 10 years in the Gulag prison camps.

== Execution ==
On 2 September 1937 he was sentenced to death by an NKVD troika and executed eight days later. He was posthumously exonerated in 1989 and 1993.

He is buried in a mass grave of Gulag victims in the Sandarmokh forest massif in Russia’s Republic of Karelia.
