= German occupation of Byelorussia during World War I =

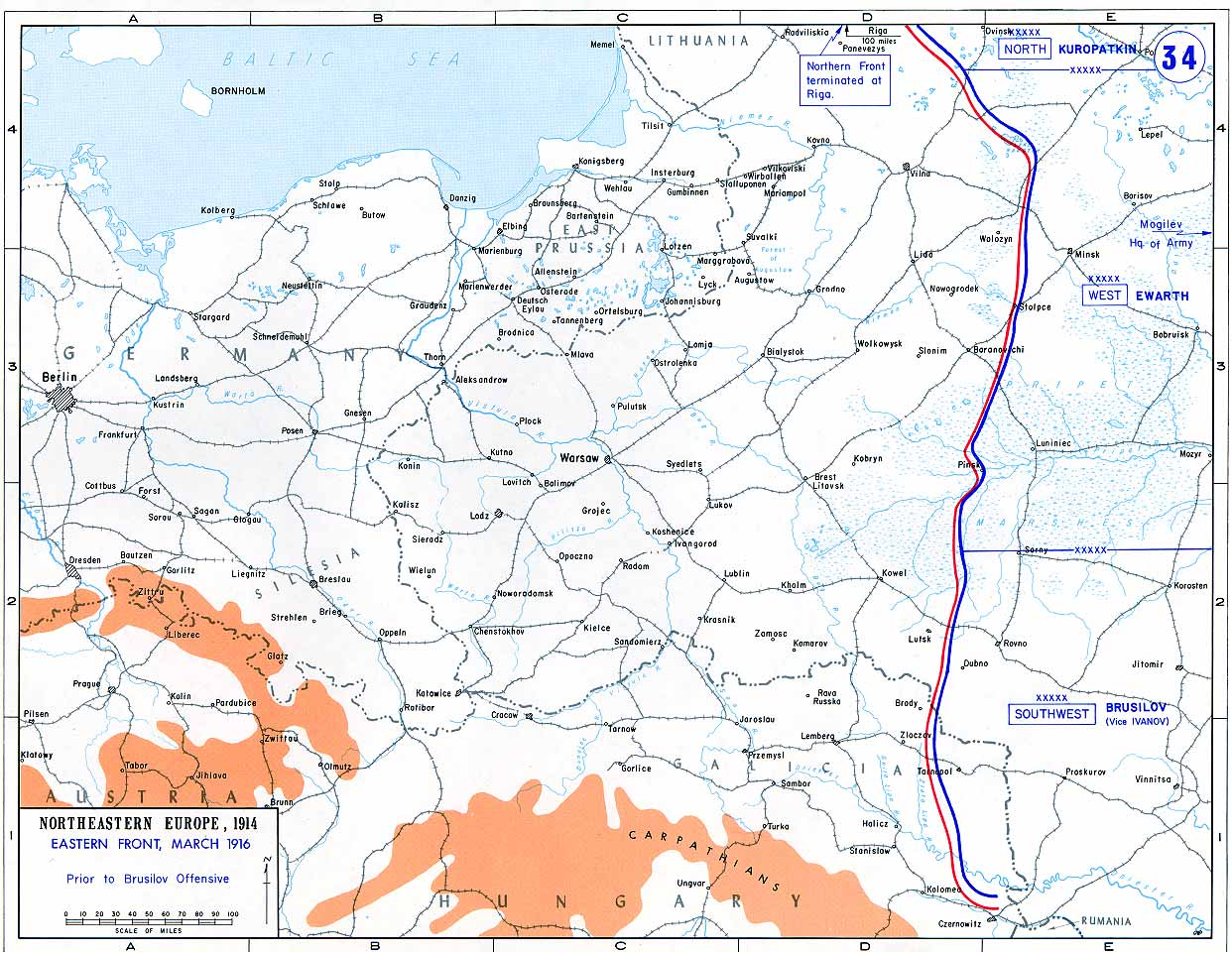
The front on the Dvinsk-Postavy-Baranovichi-Pinsk line in 1916

The German occupation of Byelorussia was a military occupation of various Belarusian regions by the Imperial German Army during the First World War (1914-1918). As one of the most western lands of the Russian Empire, Belarus was indirectly affected by war since the very outbreak of hostilities at the Eastern Front, while direct German occupation of some Belarusian regions occurred firstly in 1915, during the Great Retreat of the Imperial Russian Army. Occupied regions in Western Belarus were placed under German military administration (Ober Ost). In February 1918, during the Operation Faustschlag, various regions of Eastern Belarus also fell under German occupation, that lasted until the end of 1918, when German forces retreated from all Belarusian regions.

During the occupation, 130,000 Belarusians were killed. (Note: Including military losses (70,000) with the Russian forces.)

== Belarus before occupation ==
On the Russian-German front, the war began in August 1914 with battles in East Prussia, Poland, and Galicia. The Lithuanian-Belarusian provinces located near the theater of military operations were declared under martial law. Strikes, meetings, processions, demonstrations were prohibited, military censorship was introduced. The territory of Belarus turned out to be part of the Dvinsky and Minsk military districts, and in accordance with the decree of Nicholas II of July 20, 1914, the entire local civil administration had to obey their superiors. The Headquarters of the Supreme Commander-in-Chief, Grand Duke Nikolai Nikolaevich, was located in Baranovichi. On July 29, by his order, a directive was sent to the chiefs of military districts "to render the most energetic assistance to the civil authorities by military force, in order to eliminate any attempt at unrest at once with the full unity of the military and civilian authorities on the ground."

== Western Belarus under German occupation ==
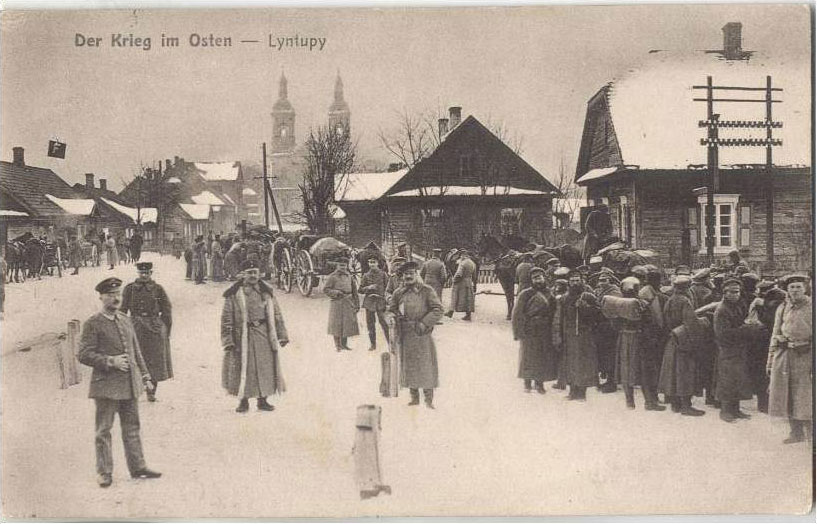
German troops in Lyntupy (Vitebsk Region) in 1916

During the First World War (1914-1918), the territory of Belarus became the scene of active hostilities. Since the beginning of the war in Baranovichi, and since August 8 (21), 1915 - in Mogilev, the Headquarters of the Supreme Commander was located. In 1915, German troops occupied the western territories of modern Belarus, from which 432 industrial facilities and a number of educational institutions were dismantled or taken to other provinces of Russia by the Russian authorities. Also, 29 enterprises were taken out of the frontline Minsk, Mogilev and Vitebsk provinces, and in the summer of 1915, in areas under threat of occupation, they destroyed crops and stocks of agricultural products with payment of compensation to peasants at state rates. A number of educational institutions were also evacuated from Belarus to Russia and Ukraine. The Belarusian People's Committee was organized in the German-occupied territory.

The war led to inflation and significant use of women and child labor. In frontline regions the civilian population was mobilized for military work (for example, at the end of 1916, 219.3 thousand men and women were mobilized in the Minsk province). The Western lands occupied by the Germans in 1915 (about 50 thousand km2) were divided into the military administrative district of the Ober-Ost, the military operational strip and Brest. The territories occupied in 1915 were subordinated to the German military command, which imposed a number of restrictions on the local population (passports with fingerprints even for children, a system of passes when leaving the place of residence): landlords' estates whose owners fled to Russia were given to the officers of the German army. An occupation currency, the German ostrubel, was also issued.

The population of the territory occupied in 1915 was taxed - per capita (8 marks in 1917 from a person aged 15 to 60 years), for industry and trade. There were also requisitions of agricultural products, a ban on killing livestock and poultry without special permission (the permit involved the surrender of part of the meat to the authorities). In 1915, forced paid work was introduced for women aged 18-45 and men aged 16-50. In 1915, 7 sawmills started operating in Belovezhskaya Pushcha. At the same time, the German occupation authorities opened a number of Belarusian, Lithuanian and Jewish schools, where the compulsory study of German was also introduced (it was forbidden to teach children in Russian).

== Entire Belarus under German occupation ==
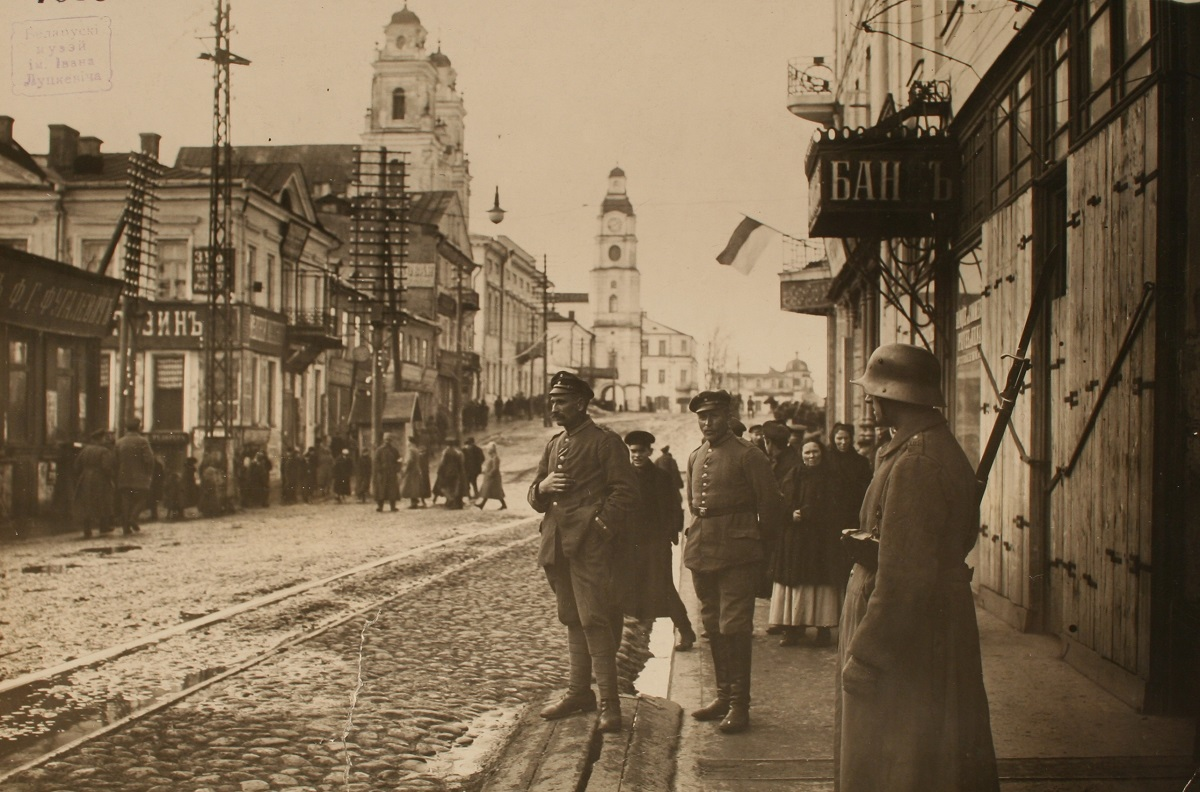
German troops in Minsk in 1918

In March 1917, the Revolution broke out in Russia, and during the following several months various political activities were undertaken in Eastern Belarus, still free of German occupation. During that period, major Belarusian organizations were advocating for autonomy of Belarus within a common state, that was envisaged as democratic and federalized Russia, but the Russian Provisional Government in Petrograd did not support such solutions. In November 1917, the Bolshevik Revolution broke out in Russia, and between 18 and 31 December 1917 (O.S. 5–18 December) the First All-Belarusian Congress was held in Minsk, deliberating on Belarusian autonomy and statehood.

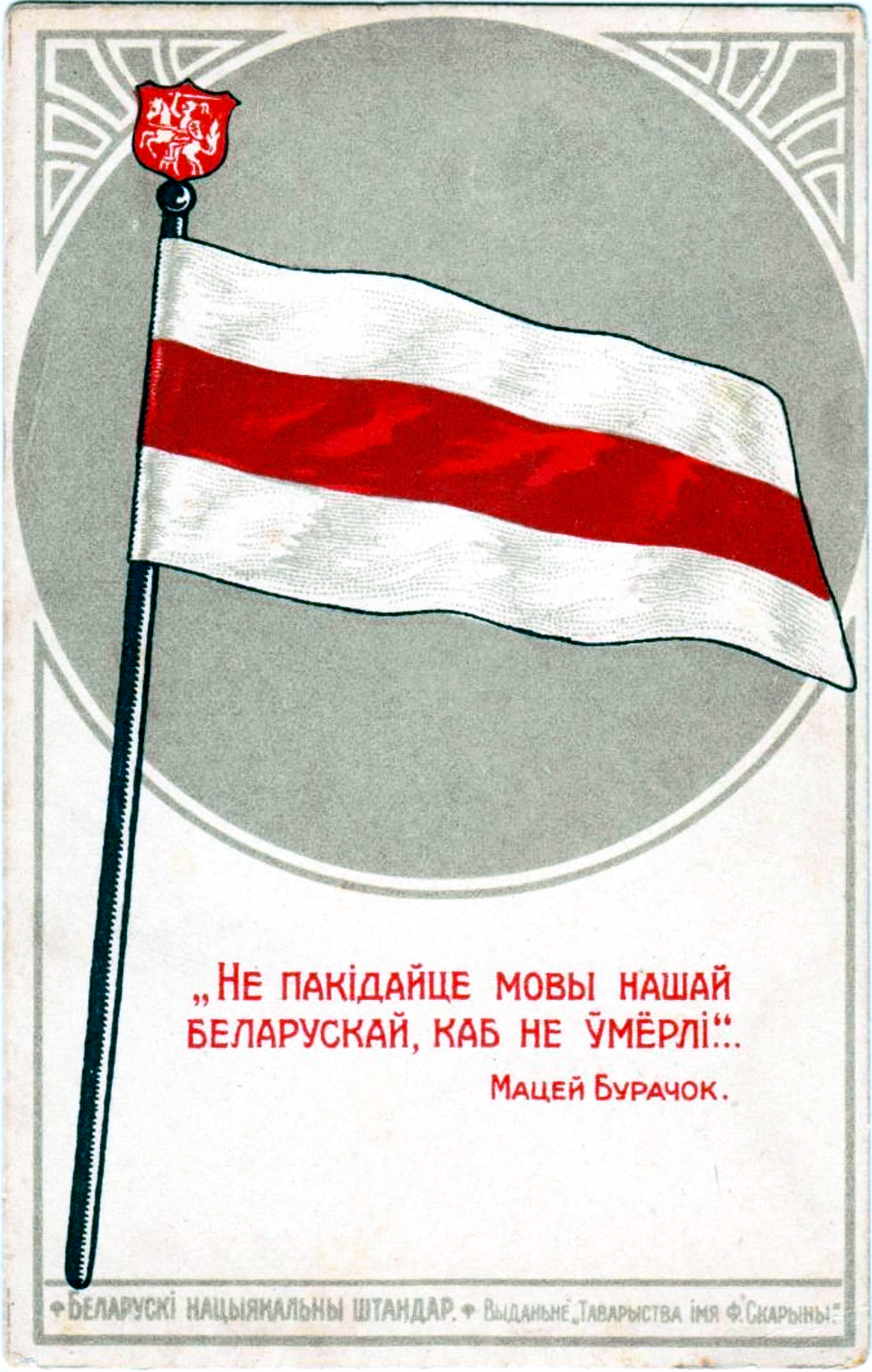
BNR postcard

Participants of the Congress were divided into supporters of the Great Belarusian Rada (supporters of independence) and the Belarusian Regional Committee (supporters of autonomy within Russia). A compromise was reached, based on principles of federalization, but on 31 December (O.S. 18 December), the Congress was dispersed by the pro-unitarist local Bolshevik authorities of the Western Oblast.

In February 1918, Germany initiated the Operation Faustschlag and occupied various regions of Eastern Belarus, including Minsk. Thus, almost all Belarus fell under German occupation. Already on 3 March 1918, a Treaty of Brest-Litovsk was signed between Germany and Soviet Russia, according to which, in addition to the territory of Western Belarus, which had been under occupation since 1915, the rest of captured Belarusian territories were also left under German control, but only provisionally, until the conclusion of the general peace in Europe.

On 9 March 1918, the Belarusian People's Republic (BPR) was proclaimed in Minsk, under German occupation, and on 25 March, the Rada of the Belarusian Democratic Republic proclaimed the independence of Belarus. In order to secure German support, the Rada decided, on the same day (25 March), to issue an appeal to the German Emperor, stating:

The Rada of the Belorussian People’s Republic, as the regular representation of the Belorussian people, expresses its deepest gratitude to Your Imperial Majesty for the liberation of Belorussia by the German Army from the unbearable yoke of foreign anarchy and oppression. The Rada has declared the independence of the whole and indivisible Belorussia, and entreats your Imperial Majesty for assistance in its task of strengthening the independence of the State and indivisibility of the country in union with the German Empire. Only under the protection of the German Empire can our country anticipate happiness in the future.

Such pro-German wording, upon being proposed and debated by members of the Rada, caused discord among its leaders. It was adopted by a majority of votes and sent to Berlin, while several prominent members protested and resigned from the Rada. Bound by political clauses of the Brest-Litovsk Treaty, the German Government did not give official recognition to Belarus, but decided to tolerate the Rada. In November 1918, upon the end of the World War I, Germany initiated a withdrawal of troops from occupied regions, thus ending the German occupation of Belarus. In December 1918, much of the Belarusian territory was captured by Soviet Russia during the Westward Offensive, while the Rada of the Belarusian Democratic Republic was forced to emigrate.

== See also ==
- History of Belarus
- Western Oblast (1917–1918)
- 1918 German invasion of Belarus
- Soviet westward offensive of 1918–1919

== Sources ==
- Kasmach, Lizaveta (2023). Belarusian Nation-Building in Times of War and Revolution. Budapest: Central European University Press.
- Figes, Orlando (1998). A People's Tragedy: the Russian Revolution, 1891–1924. New York: Penguin Books.
- Stone, Norman (1998) [1975]. The Eastern Front, 1914–1917. New York: Penguin Books.
- Sukiennicki, Wiktor (1965). "Stalin and Byelorussia's Independence". The Polish Review. 10 (4): 84–107.
- Sukiennicki, Wiktor (1984). East Central Europe During World War I: From Foreign Domination to National Independence. Boulder: East European Monographs.
