= Symon Rak-Michajłoŭski =

Belarusian politician and writer

- Сымон Рак-Міхайлоўскі
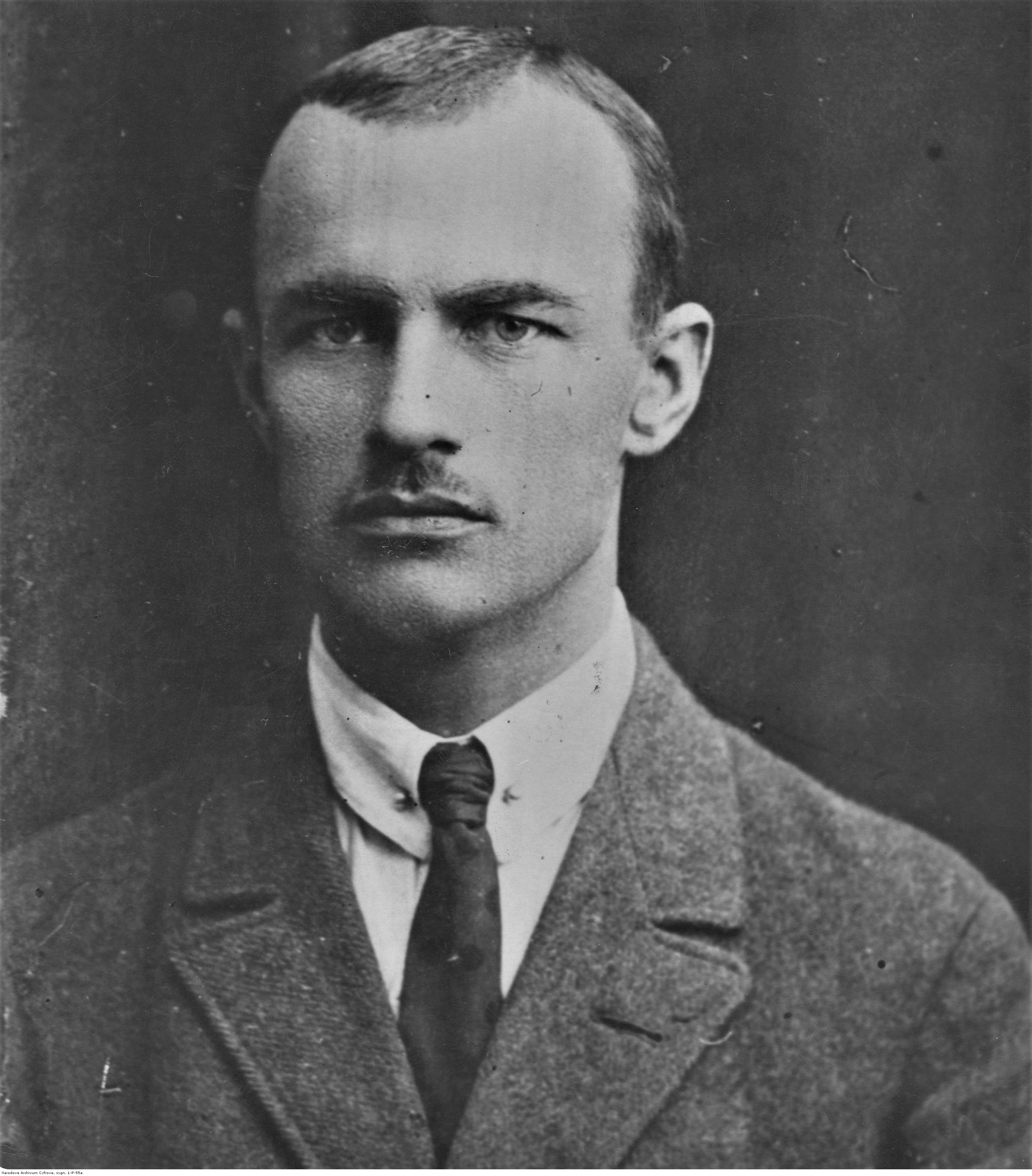
- Born: April 2, 1885; Maksimaŭka, Vialiejka District, Vilna Governorate, Russian Empire (now Maladzyechna District, Belarus)
- Died: November 27, 1938 (aged 53); Minsk, Belarusian SSR, Soviet Union
- Cause of death: Executed
- Education: Maladziečna Teachers' Seminary (1905); Feodosia Teachers' Institute (1912)
- Occupations: teacher, politician
- Organization(s): Rada of the Belarusian Democratic Republic; Sejm (Parliament) of the Second Polish Republic
- Notable work: music for the famous song ‘Zorka Venera’ based on a poem by Maksim Bahdanovič
- Political party: Belarusian Socialist Assembly, Belarusian Peasants' and Workers' Union

Symon Rak-Michajłoŭski (also spelled Symon Rak-Mikhailoŭski; Belarusian: Сымон Рак-Міхайлоўскі; 2 April 1885 – 27 November 1938) was a Belarusian political leader, writer, and teacher. He was a member of the Rada of the Belarusian Democratic Republic and a deputy of the Sejm (Parliament) of the Second Polish Republic (1922–1927). He wrote extensively for several newspapers, including Naša Niva, Belarus and Zvon, and authored music for the famous song "Zorka Venera" (the Venus Star) based on a poem by Maksim Bahdanovič.

== Early years and the beginning of political career ==
Rak-Michajłoŭski was born into a farming family in the village of Maksimaŭka in Vialiejka district, Vilna Governorate of the Russian Empire (nowadays – in Maladziečna district, Minsk Region of Belarus) on 2 April 1885. Having graduated from the Maladziečna Teachers' Seminary (1905), he taught in various schools in Belarus for several years, participated in cultural activities and collected folk songs.

His political activities among Belarusian peasants date back to the period of the first Russian Revolution in 1905, when Rak-Michajłoŭski was elected by the peasants of his region to be their lobbying delegate in the State Duma (Parliament of the Russian Empire). In 1906 he was imprisoned for three months for distribution of social democratic literature. Rak-Michajłoŭski wanted to continue his education in the Vilna Teachers' Institute but was not accepted due to his involvement in politics. The persecution by public authorities forced him to relocate to Crimea, where he graduated from the Feodosia Teachers' Institute (1912) and, later, worked as a college teacher.

Rak-Michajłoŭski was called up for military duty during World War I and served as a clerk due to his poor health. At this time, he disseminated revolutionary ideas among soldiers and started writing for various newspapers. His first article "Some thoughts during a military campaign" (Belarusian: З думак у паходзе) was published by Naša Niva in 1915.

== Involvement in the Belarusian independence movement ==
After the February Revolution in 1917, Rak-Michajłoŭski moved to Minsk, joined the Belarusian Socialist Assembly, and become actively involved in the political life there. He was instrumental in forming the Belarusian Central Military Council of which he was elected chairman. He also took part in preparing the First All-Belarusian Congress in 1917 and became a member of the Rada of the Belarusian Democratic Republic.

Active among the military, Rak-Michajłoŭski also began an intensive campaign for establishing Belarusian schools. He organized the first Belarusian Teachers' Training courses in Minsk, 1918–1919, a Teachers' Seminary in the town of Baruny, and later, Teachers' Courses in Vilna, 1921. While working in different capacities in the Government of the Belarusian Democratic Republic, he also edited the Belarusian-language daily, Biełaruskaje Słova in Horadnia.

== In Western Belarus ==
After the signing of the Treaty of Riga in 1921, Rak-Michajłoŭski did not want to go into exile and remained in Western Belarus which was transferred to the Second Polish Republic under the treaty. He became a teacher in the Belarusian High School in Vilna. In 1922 Rak-Michajłoŭski was elected to the Polish Sejm, working actively with several Belarusian organizations but devoting most of his time to the Society of Belarusian Schools (Tavarystva Biełaruskaj Školy). Using his parliamentary immunity, Rak-Michajłoŭski expressed openly his national ideas and, together with his associates, participated in the preparation of an anti-Polish uprising on the territory of Western Belarus.

In 1927, however, Rak-Michajłoŭski was arrested by the Polish authorities and sentenced to a prison term of 12 years "for communist propaganda". Later, the court of appeal commuted the sentence to 6 years of imprisonment and, in 1930, Rak-Michajłoŭski was released.

== In Soviet Belarus. Persecution and death ==
In 1930, Rak-Michajłoŭski fled to the Soviet Belarus under threat of re-arrest in Poland. He settled in Minsk and became the director of the Belarusian State Museum. However, he was arrested on 16 August 1933 by the Soviet authorities in the case of the Belarusian National Centre and, on 9 January 1934, sentenced to capital punishment as "the leader of a counterrevolutionary organisation," replaced later by 10 years of Gulag prison camps. In 1937, after several years spent in the Solovki prison camp, Rak-Michajłoŭski was sent back to Minsk and sentenced to capital punishment as a Polish agent. He was executed in Minsk on 27 November 1938, and, in 1956, posthumously exonerated.

== Notable works ==
- Гутарка аб беларускай мове [Discourse about the Belarusian Language], Minsk, 1919;
- Страшны вораг: Кніжка пра гарэлку [Dangerous Enemy: a Book about Spirit], Vilna, 1924;
- Прамовы дэпутатаў Беларускага пасольскага клубу ў Польскім Сойме. Паводле соймавых стэнаграм [Talks by the deputies of the Belarusian Deputy Club in the Polish Sejm. Based on the Sejm's stenography records], Vilna 1924;
- Прамовы дэпутатаў соймавага клубу Беларускай сялянска-работніцкай грамады [Talks by the deputies of the Sejm Club of the Peasants' and Workers' Union], Vilna, 1926.
- Турэмны дзённік [A Prisoner's Diary] // Куфэрак Віленшчыны. 2007. No. 1 (12). c. 48–97.

Rak-Michajłoŭski authored music for the famous song ‘Zorka Venera’ (the Venus Star) based on a poem by Maksim Bahdanovič. However, the music was described as “folk” for a long time due to the persecution of its true author.
