= Fabijan Šantyr =

Belarusian poet

Fabijan Šantyr Commissioner for National Affairs of the BSSR’s Provisional Government
- Фабіян Шантыр
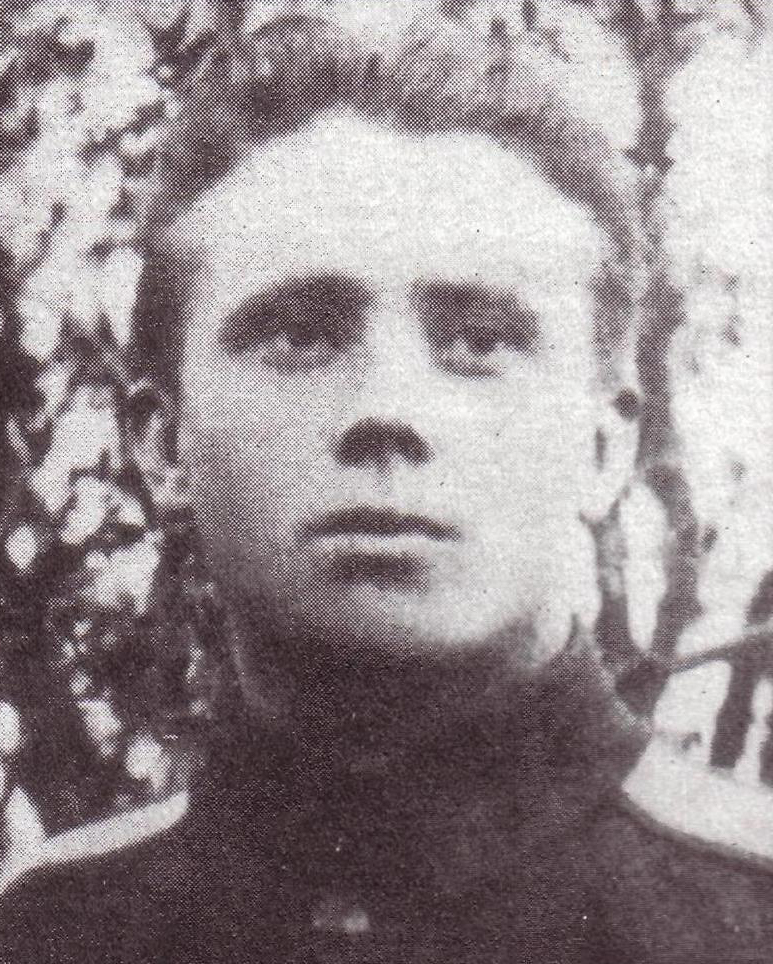
- Born: February 4, 1887; Slutsk, Minsk Region
- Died: May 29, 1920 (aged 33); Novozybkov
- Cause of death: executed
- Occupations: poet, writer and politician
- Political party: Belarusian Socialist Assembly “Hramada”

Fabijan Šantyr (also spelled Fabiyan Shantyr, Belarusian: Фабіян Шантыр; 4 February 1887 - 29 May 1920) was a Belarusian poet, writer and public figure who has been regarded as “the first victim of [the Bolsheviks] in...Belarusian politics and literature”.

== Early years ==
Šantyr was born into the family of an artist in Slucak and lost his mother at a young age. In his youth he worked as a decorator and was engaged in self-education. "I grew up in an atmosphere of complete independence and never accepted any conditions that in one way or another would limit the will of the individual," he wrote in one of his letters.

He was imprisoned in Slucak between 1905-07 for participation in the events of the 1905 Revolution.

== Involvement in the Belarusian independence movement ==
Šantyr started writing in 1909 and his works were published in the Belarusian newspapers “Naša Niva" and Dzianica. In 1914 he was mobilised into the Russian Imperial Army and served as a supervisor of a field hospital in Babrujsk. From Babrujsk he travelled to Minsk to take part in the activities of Belarusian cultural and political organisations and became one of the leaders of the left wing of the Belarusian Socialist Assembly “Hramada”.

In December 1917 he took part in the First All-Belarusian Congress where he made a "passionate“ pro-independence speech:

"When we are told to forget our homeland, I do not understand this. Assimilation is slavery. Why did you come here? You were brought here by the national feeling. The national revival will never die."

== With the Bolsheviks ==
In 1918 Šantyr was faced with a choice: to stay in the Belarusian independence movement or to support the Bolsheviks. In the end, his long-held far-left views prevailed and he chose the second option.

He worked for the Bolsheviks in several administrative positions in Slucak and Smolensk and, after the proclamation of the Belarusian Soviet Socialist Republic in 1919, became the Commissioner for National Affairs of the Republic’s Provisional Government. He participated in the publication of the communist newspaper "Soviet Belarus".

In 1920 he resigned in protest against the partition of Belarus by the Bolsheviks and Poland and re-enlisted in the Red Army to “liberate the Motherland from the occupation by the White Poles”.

However, in April of the same year he was arrested by the Red Army’s counterintelligence and accused of "talking to military specialists" and possible espionage.

== Death ==
On 26 April 1920, Šantyr was sentenced to death and executed three days later in Novozybkov.

He was posthumously exonerated in independent Belarus in 1992 and is regarded as “the first victim of Bolshevik terror in Belarusian politics and literature”.

== Publications with Šantyr’s works ==
- Патрэбнасць нацыянальнага жыцця для беларусаў і самаадзначэння народа [The Necessity of the national life for Belarusian people and self-determination of the nation], Slucak, 1918

In the book Šantyr discussed the history of the Belarusian people and its relationship with its neighbours and questions of national revival and self-determination. In particular he wrote that “only the Belarusian government on the native Belarusian land will provide the people with a normal civilised life".

- Зажынкі [Zažynki]

Zažynki is an ancient ritual associated with the beginning of the harvest.

Published in 1918 by a decision of Soviet Belarus’ government as "the first collection of works by Belarusian singers and writers who came from the family of the working people."

- У час барацьбы [At the time of struggle], Krynica. 1988, № 11.

== See also ==
- Fabijan Šantyr: "The national revival will never die" - a blog post on the website of the Belarusian library in London.
