= Larysa Hienijuš =

Belarusian poet

- Ларыса Геніюш
- Born: Larysa Miklaševič; August 9, 1910; Žlobaǔcy, Grodno Governorate, Russian Empire
- Died: April 7, 1983; Zelva, Byelorussian SSR, Soviet Union
- Occupations: Poet, writer
- Known for: Belarusian national movement
- Notable work: Ад родных ніў, Невадам з Нёмана
- Spouse: Janka Hienijuš
- Children: 1

Larysa Hienijuš (Belarusian: Ларыса Геніюш; August 9, 1910 – April 7, 1983) was a Belarusian poet, writer and active participant of the national movement.

== Biography ==
=== Childhood and youth ===
She was born Larysa Miklaševič in the estate Žlobaǔcy (now Vaǔkavysk raion, Grodno Region) into the family of a wealthy land-owner. She had many siblings. Hienijuš went to a Polish school, in 1928 she successfully completed Vaǔkavysk Polish Gymnasium. At that time, she got acquainted with the world literature - the Polish, Scandinavian and English classics. She also started writing poetry.

=== Life in Prague ===
On 3 February she married a medical student, Janka Hienijuš, who at that time was studying at Charles University, Prague. In 1937, after the birth of their son Jurka, she joined her husband in Prague. There, one of Hienijušs' neighbors was Alexandra Kosach-Shimanovskaya, sister of Lesya Ukrainka - the author whose work has greatly influenced the Belarusian poet. Hienijuš's first published poems appeared in "Раніца", a Berlin newspaper of Belarusian emigrants in 1939. In July 1941, as a member of the Belarusian Self-Help Committee, Hienijuš issued a document to the Jewish family Wolfsohn, which they passed off as Orthodox Belarusians, although all committee members were aware that they were Jews. Because of this, the Wolfsohn family was able to survive the Second World War. In 1942, her first collection of poetry, «Ад родных ніў» was published. It was filled with nostalgia and thoughts about the fate of her homeland.

When in 1939 the Red Army took over western Belarus, the poet's father, Anton Miklaševič, was shot dead and his mother and two sisters were deported to Kazakhstan. According to the will of the then President of the Belarusian People's Republic (BNR) Vasil Zacharka, Larysa Hienijuš was appointed Secretary General of the Government of BNR in exile in March 1943. She preserved and organised the BNR archive, took care of Belarusian immigrants, political refugees and prisoners of war. She hid the most valuable part of the archive in the location out of the reach of the NKVD and the MGB. Later, the Soviet security service tortured the poet to get hold of the archive.

=== Arrest and conviction ===
After the Second World War, Larysa Hienijuš with her husband and son lived in Vimperk near Prague. 5 March 1948, they were arrested by the MGB. Both Larysa and Janka Hienijuš were kept in the prisons in Czechoslovakia and Lviv, Ukraine. In October 1948 they were transferred to a prison in Minsk. Here Larysa Hienijuš was interrogated and tortured by the BSSR Minister of State Security Lavrentiy Tsanava.

On 7 February 1949, both Hienijušes were sentenced to 25 years of imprisonment. The poet served her term in the camps of the Komi ASSR. She showed an example of a phenomenal spiritual strength by bringing together Belarusians and prisoners of other nationalities, and continued writing poetry. Prisoners called her Mother and her poems - glucose, memorising them by heart and reading as a prayer. After eight years, Larysa Hienijuš was released in 1956.

The tragic fate befell other members of Miklaševič family: the poet's mother and two sisters died in Kazakhstan in 1945; her brother, Arkadź, soldier in the Anders' Army, died on 27 July 1944 in the Battle of Monte Cassino in Italy, and another brother, Raścislaǔ, soldier in the Polish Army, died on 26 (28?) April 1945 near Berlin.

=== Zelva years ===
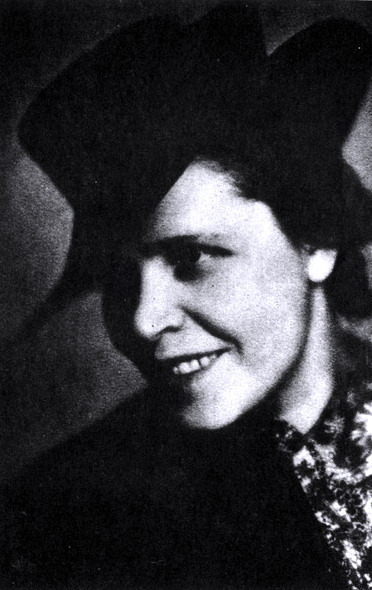
Larysa Hienijuš

After her release, the poet settled in her husband's home in Zelva. Both Hienijušes refused to accept the Soviet citizenship and the rest of their lives lived with a note "Stateless" in their passports. On several occasions they requested rehabilitation, but every time received a reply: “Sentenced lawfully”. KGB followed the poet everywhere, read the letters sent to her from all around the world, installed spying devices in her house. Janka Hienijuš was allowed to work as a doctor in the local clinic, and her wife - not for long - as a cleaner. In 1979, Janka died and the poet was allocated a meager pension. The authorities denied the poet a quiet old age; only once she was allowed to visit her son Jurka, who lived in Białystok, Poland.

For nearly ten years, the poet's works were totally banned. Only in 1963, her post-imprisonment poems were published in Belarusian magazines for the first time. Thanks to the then Chairman of the Supreme Soviet of the BSSR, Maksim Tank, Larysa Hienijuš's first in Belarus collection of works, «Невадам зь Нёмана» was published in 1967. It was edited by Uladzimir Karatkievič pro bono. It included most of the poems from «Ад родных ніў» without some excerpts removed by censors, as well as new poems of the Zelva period. Then, for years she was allowed to publish only children's poetry.

=== Death and rehabilitation refusal ===
Larysa Hienijuš died in 1983. Thousands of people came to her burial.

In 1999, the Belarusian Helsinki Committee appealed to the General Prosecutor's Office to annul an unjust sentence against both Hienijušs. The Office forwarded the appeal to the Supreme Court which refused the annulment as the poet "has no grounds for rehabilitation." However, the reasons for refusal were unknown as, according to the Court's letter, "they may only be given to the repressed person".

== Bibliography ==
=== Poetry ===
- Ад родных ніў (Prague, 1942; reprinted: Slonim, 1995)
- Невадам з Нёмана (Minsk, 1967)
- На чабары настоена. Лірыка (Minsk, 1982)
- Dzieviać vieršaǔ (Biełastok, 1987)
- Белы сон: Вершы і паэмы (Minsk, 1990)
- Вершы: Рукапісны зборнік з 1945—1947 (London, 1992)
- Маці і сын (пад адной вокладкай зборнікі Ларысы Геніюш «Сэрца» і Юркі Геніюша «Да свету») (Biełastok, 1992)
- Выбраныя вершы (Minsk, 1997)
- Выбраныя творы (Minsk, 2000)

=== Children's books ===
- Казкі для Міхаські (Minsk, 1972)
- Добрай раніцы, Алесь (Minsk, 1976)

=== Other works ===
- Споведзь: (успаміны) (Minsk, 1993)
- Каб вы ведалі: З эпісталярнай спадчыны (1945-1983) (Minsk, 2005)
