= J.C. Hryb =

J.C. Hryb (born John-Christophe Hryb) is an interior designer born in Versailles (France) and emigrated to The United States of America in 1993.

== Companies ==
Hryb owns custom furniture and interior design company Style de Vie, and the vintage steel furniture restoration company Twenty Gauge; located inside the historical Helms Bakery in Culver City, California.

In 2008, J.C. worked collaboratively with fellow French designer Christian Audigier to design Audigier's flagship retail clothing store and furnishings for THE SAME GUY (retail store name) in Los Angeles, CA.

J.C. also restores/customizes vintage furniture pieces for Twenty Gauge. Twenty Gauge specializes in restoring and revitalizing vintage furnishings from the 1930s through '50s to give them new lives, albeit with a slightly modern twist. J.C. says on reclaiming or upcycling vintage furniture, "I love its industrial look and the history, yet the lines are clean...and made of metal so it has a modern aspect."
