= Belarusian Socialist Assembly =

Former political party in Belarus

Belarusian Socialist Assembly Беларуская сацыялістычная грамада
- Founded: 1902
- Dissolved: 1918
- Succeeded by: Communist Party of Byelorussia
- Headquarters: Minsk
- Membership (1917): 10,000
- Ideology: Belarusian nationalism Democratic socialism Social democracy Left-wing populism
- Political position: Centre-left

The Belarusian Socialist Assembly, BSA (Belarusian: Беларуская сацыялістычная грамада, romanized: Biełaruskaja sacyjalistyčnaja hramada, BSH) was a revolutionary party in the Belarusian territory of the Russian Empire. It was established in 1902 as the Belarusian Revolutionary Party, renamed in 1903.

The BSA had branches in Minsk, Vilnius and Saint Petersburg. After the February Revolution in Russia, the political activity in Belarus increased, and in summer of 1917 the BSA gave rise to the Communist Party of Byelorussia, Belarusian Party of Socialist Federalists, Belarusian Party of Social-Revolutionaries and the Belarusian Social Democratic Party.

On March 19, 1918, on the initiative of the BSA, the Rada of the Belarusian Democratic Republic became a temporary, short-lived parliament in the Belarusian Democratic Republic. Most of the BNR Council were members of the BSA.

Russian Bolsheviks had a negative attitude towards the BSA. Vladimir Lenin described BSA as a "nationalist petite bourgeoisie party of left-populist orientation". The 2nd Congress of the Soviets of the Western Province (Russia) declared the Council of the Belarusian People's Republic counter-revolutionary and anti-Soviet.

After the Polish-Soviet War, many activists of the BSA have found themselves in Poland, which acquired Western Belarus, and they struggled for the Belarusian autonomy.

== Notable members ==
- Vaclau Lastouski, politician and historian
- Jazep Losik, academic and member of the Rada of the Belarusian Democratic Republic
- Jazep Mamońka, politician and member of the Rada of the Belarusian Democratic Republic
- Alaiza Pashkevich, writer
- Jan Sierada, politician
- Branislaŭ Taraškievič, linguist
- Vasil Zacharka, the second president of the Belarusian People's Republic
- Paluta Badunova, politician, the only woman at the Council (Rada) of the Belarusian Democratic Republic
- Fabijan Šantyr, poet
