= Vasil Zacharka =

Belarusian politician

- Васіль Захарка
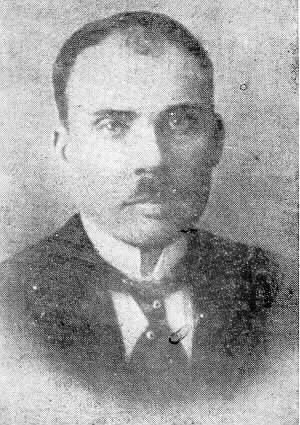

President of the Rada of the Belarusian Democratic Republic in exile
- In office March 1928 – 6 March 1943
- Preceded by: Piotra Krečeŭski
- Succeeded by: Mikoła Abramčyk

Personal details
- Born: 1 April 1877 Vaukavysk uyezd, Russian Empire
- Died: 14 April 1943 (aged 66) Prague, Protectorate of Bohemia and Moravia
- Party: Belarusian Socialist Assembly
- Profession: Military officer

Vasil Zacharka (Belarusian: Васіль Захарка, 1 April 1877, Dabrasielcy near Grodno – 14 March 1943, Prague) was a Belarusian statesman and the second president of the Belarusian People's Republic in exile.

== Early life ==
Vasil Zacharka was born in a peasant family near Grodno. In 1895 he became a certified church school teacher and later worked at school.

In 1898 Zacharka was mobilized to the Russian army and was demobilized in 1902. By that time he already was member of a large Belarusian national organization, the Belarusian Socialist Assembly.

He was again mobilized in 1904 following the outbreak of the Russo-Japanese War and served in the military on several administrative posts till 1917.

== Political activism ==
Vasil Zacharka was an active participant of the Congress of Belarusian West Front Militarymen on 22 October 1917 in Minsk and became secretary of the newly created Central Belarusian Military Council. He was also elected member of the Council of the First All-Belarusian Congress later that year.

After proclamation of the independence on 25 March 1918, Vasil Zacharka held different positions in the government of Belarus.

== In exile ==
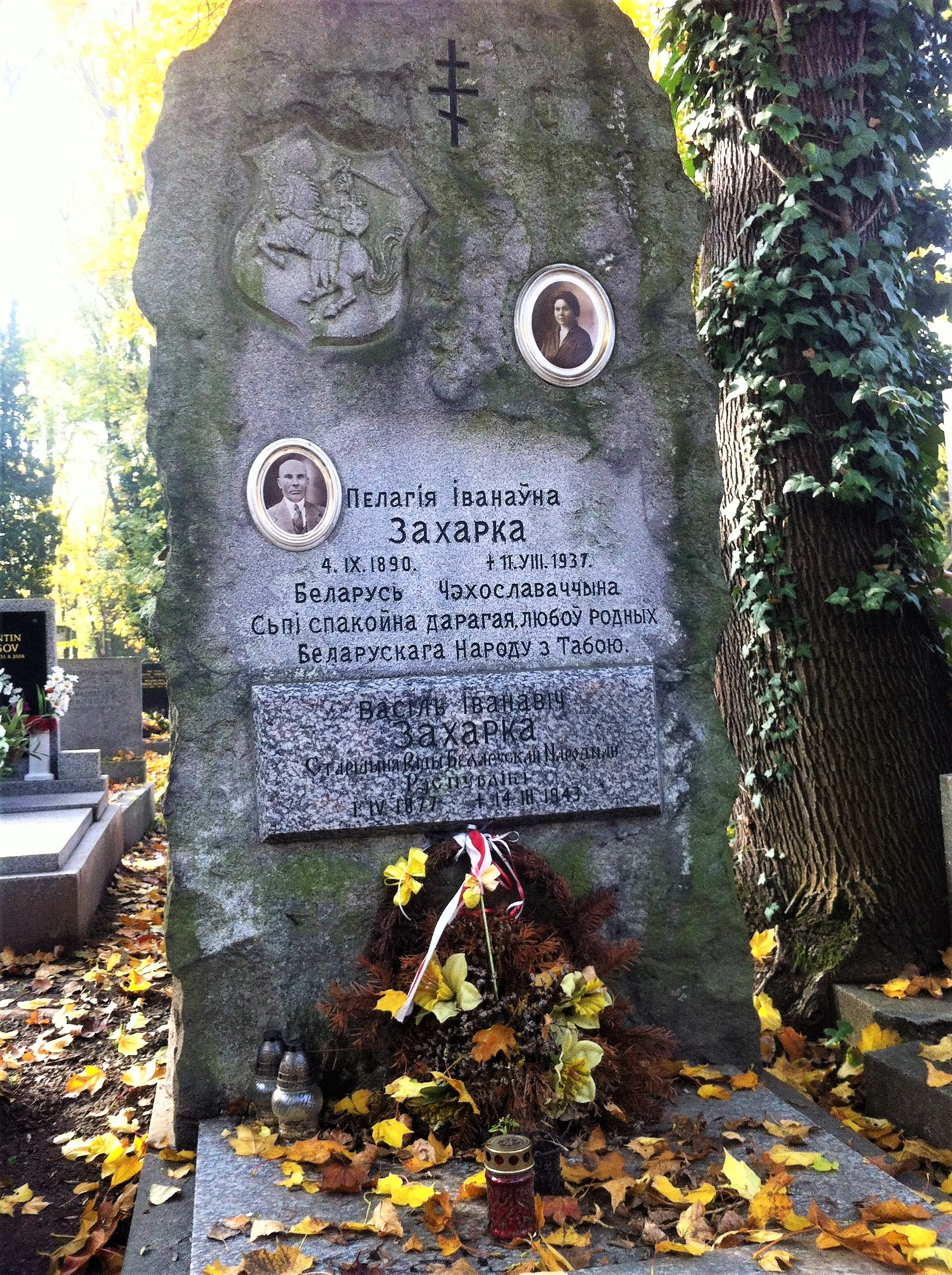
Grave of Vasil Zacharka in Prague

With the Bolshevik invasion of Belarus in 1919, the government of Belarus had to evacuate to Vilnius and then to Grodno. Zacharka was among the creators of appeals to the League of Nations, Great Britain, France, USA and other countries by the Belarusian government.

On 2 June 1920 Zacharka was appointed chief of the Belarusian diplomatic mission to Moscow where he held negotiations with the Russian foreign minister Georgy Chicherin. Zacharka tried to convince the Soviets to recognize the independence of Belarus and to liberate Belarusian political prisoners held in Russian jails.

After the Peace of Riga in 1921 the Belarusian government in exile passed resolutions criticizing it and supporting the Slutsk defence action.

In 1925 Zacharka managed to prevent the government of the Belarusian People's Republic to abandon its authority in favour of the Belarusian Soviet Socialist Republic, despite the fact that many members of the democratic government were advocating this idea.

Zacharka served as deputy president of the Belarusian People's Republic Piotra Krecheuski and became president upon his death in early 1928. As president he protested against the transferral of Vilnius from the Belarusian SSR to the Republic of Lithuania in October 1939.

On 20 April 1939 Zacharka sent together with Ivan Yermachenka a seventeen-page memorandum to Adolf Hitler personally asking him to take into account the interests of Belarus in any future developments. On 28 June 1941 Zacharka telegraphed to Hitler, that he wishes him a quick and decisive victory over the Judeo-Bolshevik regime on all fronts. When it became clear that the Germans were not ready to create a Belarusian government, and Belarusians were given the place of executors of the orders of the German leadership, Vasil Zacharka stopped cooperating with the Germans and began to sharply criticize them in his articles. The Rada of the Belarusian Democratic Republic did not recognize the Belarusian Central Council, a puppet administrative body established by Nazi Germany.

In July 1941, as a member of the Belarusian Self-Help Committee, Zacharka issued a document to the Jewish family Wolfsohn, which they passed off as Orthodox Belarusians, although all committee members were aware that they were Jews. Because of this, the Wolfsohn family was able to survive the Second World War.

Vasil Zacharka died in Prague in 1943 and left a rich archive of documents about the Belarusian Democratic Republic.

== Works ==
- Галоўныя моманты беларускага руху, Прага, 1926 – захоўваецца ў рукапісе ў Бібліятэцы імя Францыска Скарыны ў Лёндане (Main Episodes of the Belarusian National Movement)
- Беларусь – роля і значэньне на ўсходзе Эўропы. (Belarus – its Role and Importance in Eastern Europe)
- Пратэст Захаркі Прэзыдэнту Летувы – Спадчына №1–1994
- Закон аб грамадзянстве БНР ад 14 сьнежня 1919 – Спадчына №1–1994 (Law on Citizenship of the Belarusian Democratic Republic)

== Sources ==
- (in Belarusian) Галіна Глагоўская "Васіль Захарка – Другі Прэзыдэнт БНР" // Спадчына №1–1994 [Halina Hlahouskaja, Vasil Zacharka, the Second President of the BNR, published in the magazine Spadchyna, №1/1994]
- (in Belarusian) Васіль Захарка На вернай службе бацькаўшчыне й народу (на 10 год сьмерці) // Спадчына №1–1994 [Vasil Zacharka at his Faithful Service to Fatherland and the People, Spadchyna, №1/1994]
