= Pyotra Krecheuski =

Belarusian politician

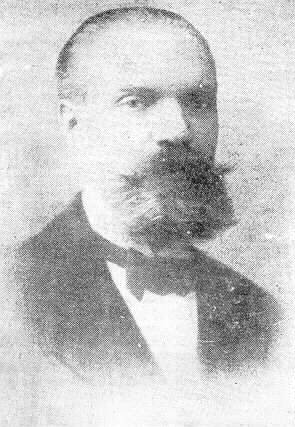

President of the Rada of the Belarusian Democratic Republic in exile
- In office December 1919 – March 8, 1928
- Preceded by: Jazep Losik
- Succeeded by: Vasil Zacharka
- Prime Minister: Vaclaŭ Lastoŭski; Alaksandar Cvikievic; Vasil Zacharka

Personal details
- Born: August 7, 1879 Dubna, Grodnensky Uyezd, Grodno Governorate, Russian Empire
- Died: March 8, 1928 (aged 48) Prague, Czechoslovakia
- Profession: Teacher, historian

Pyotra Krecheuski (Belarusian: Пётра Крэчэўскі, Łacinka: Piotra Krečeŭski, Russian: Пётр Антонович Кречевский; August 7, 1879 – March 8, 1928, Prague) was a Belarusian statesman and president of the Rada of the Belarusian Democratic Republic in exile.

Before the First World War he worked as a teacher in Jałówka near Białystok. He was delegate at the First All-Belarusian Congress in 1917 and member of the Council of the Belarusian Democratic Republic. In December 1919 Krecheuski was elected President of the Council of the Belarusian Republic and served on this post till his death.

In exile in Prague since 1919, he organized active information campaigns for Western governments about the current states of Belarusian SSR and West Belarus. He organized a conference of Belarusian emigrant organizations in September 1921 that criticized the Polish-Bolshevist Peace of Riga that divided Belarus in two parts.

Krecheuski convinced the Czechoslovak government to give grants for Belarusian students. He created the Belarusian archive in Prague and published the politological almanac Zamiežnaja Biełaruś.

== Works ==
- Беларусь у мінулам і сучаснам (нарыс географічнага, гістарычнага і эканамічнага доследу) // Замежная Беларусь: зборнік гісторыі, культуры і эканомікі / Пад рэд. П. А. Крэчэўскага. Кн. 1. Прага: Выд-ва імяні Ф. Скарыны, 1926. C. 31–77. [Belarus in the Past and Present (Project of a Historical and Economic Study)].
- Гісторыя беларускай кнігі // Замежная Беларусь: зборнік гісторыі, культуры і эканомікі. С. 99–116. [History of the Belarusian Book].
- Мандаты Б Н. Р. // Замежная Беларусь: зборнік гісторыі, культуры і эканомікі. C. 121–139. [Mandates of the Belarusian Democratic Republic].
- Скарына і незалежнасьць // Замежная Беларусь: зборнік гісторыі, культуры і эканомікі. С. 7–16. [Skaryna and Independence].
- Рагнеда: Гіст. драма Х ст. у 4 актах з пралогам // Спадчына. 1993. №3. С.16–30 [Rahnieda, a drama in four parts].
