= Jan Sierada =

First president of the Rada of the Belarusian Democratic Republic

- Ян Серада
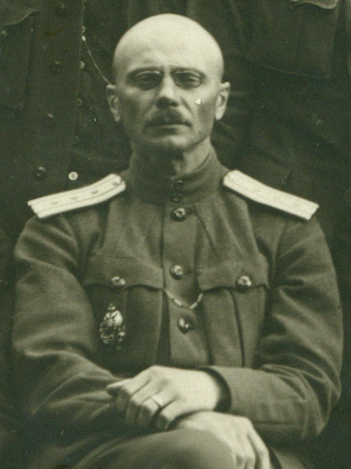
- Sierada in 1918

Chairman of the People's Secretariat of the Belarusian Democratic Republic
- In office 22 July 1918 – 11 November 1918 Serving with Raman Skirmunt
- Preceded by: Jazep Varonka
- Succeeded by: Anton Luckievich

President of the Rada of the Belarusian Democratic Republic
- In office 9 March 1918 – 14 May 1918
- Preceded by: Position established
- Succeeded by: Jazep Losik

Personal details
- Born: Ivan Mikitavič Sierada; 13 May 1879 Zadzvieja, Minsk Governorate, Russian Empire (now Belarus)
- Died: after 19 November 1943 (aged 64) Soviet Union
- Party: Belarusian Socialist Assembly
- Education: Warsaw University of Life Sciences
- Profession: Scientist, agricultural technologist

Military service
- Allegiance: Russia
- Branch/service: Imperial Russian Army
- Years of service: 1905–1906; 1914–1918
- Battles/wars: Russo-Japanese War; World War I

Ivan Mikitavič Sierada (Note: Belarusian: Іван Мікітавіч Серада) (13 May [O.S. 1 May] 1879 – after 19 November 1943), better known by the pseudonyms of Jan (Note: Belarusian: Ян) or Janka (Note: Belarusian: Янка) was a Belarusian statesman, pedagogist and writer who served as the first president of the Rada of the Belarusian Democratic Republic.

== Biography ==
Ivan Mikitavič Sierada was born in the village of Zadzvieja in Minsk Governorate of the Russian Empire (now in Brest Region, Belarus).

From 1905 to 1906, Sierada served in the Imperial Russian Army in Manchuria during the Russo-Japanese War, and was also mobilized during World War I.

He graduated from a veterinary school in Warsaw in 1903 and worked as a veterinarian in the Minsk Governorate in 1907–1911. At the same time he was a teacher at an agricultural college in Marjina Horka.

Jan Sierada was an active member of the Belarusian Socialist Assembly. In 1917, he was elected the chairman of the First All-Belarusian Congress. In 1918, he was elected president of the short-lived Belarusian Democratic Republic. In February 1918, he was a member of the Belarusian delegation (together with Simon Rak-Mikhailovsky and Alaksandar Ćvikievič) at the peace talks in Brest-Litovsk.

In the 1920s, Sierada worked on different positions in the Agriculture Ministry of the Byelorussian Soviet Socialist Republic, and was also a teacher at several colleges and published several works on agriculture.

On 4 July 1930, Sierada was arrested by the NKVD as part of the so-called Case of the Union of Liberation of Belarus. In April 1931, he was sentenced to 5 years of exile in Yaroslavl, in the Russian Soviet Federative Socialist Republic. After this, he was again sentenced in 1941 to 10 more years in the Gulag. He was set free, on 19 November 1943, from the gulag camp chain (Krasnoyarsk Krai) and his further fate is unknown.

He has been rehabilitated on his cases in 1988 and 1989.

== Works ==
- Yak treba kavats horses. Mn., 1926.
- Veterinary and zoohygiene. Book. 1–2. Mn., 1927–1928.
- Pabudov's strength in Kalgas and Saugas. Mn., 1930.
