= Western Oblast (1917–18) =

Oblast in Russian Empire/RSFSR

Western Oblast (Belarusian: Заходняя вобласць, Russian: Западная область) was an administrative unit (oblast) of the Russian Republic and the Soviet Russia, encompassing various western regions, mainly in modern Belarus and Lithuania. It was created in 1917, and included several governorates (Minsk, Mogilev, Vilna, Vitebsk). Its first administrative center was the city of Minsk.

In February 1918, German imperial troops occupied much of the region, including Minsk, and regional administration retreated to Smolensk, consequently adding the Smolensk Governorate to the Western Oblast. On 27 August 1918, the Treaty of Berlin was signed between Imperial Germany and Soviet Russia, and (under the article 3) it was agreed that German troops will evacuate territories east of the Berezina river, thus returning various eastern parts of the region to the Russian control.

Already in December (1918), during the Soviet westward offensive, the region was fully reincorporated into the Soviet Russia, and renamed into the Western Commune. It was confirmed as part of the RSFSR by the Administrative Commission of VTsIK on December 23 (1918), but already on December 28 political decision was made to establish Byelorussia as a distinctive soviet republic, that was officially proclaimed on January 1, 1919, as the Socialist Soviet Republic of Byelorussia.

== See also ==
- History of Belarus
- History of Lithuania
- Minsk Governorate
- Mogilev Governorate
- Vilna Governorate
- Vitebsk Governorate
- Western Oblast
- Western Krai

== Sources ==
- Kasmach, Lizaveta (2023). Belarusian Nation-Building in Times of War and Revolution. Budapest: Central European University Press.
