= Golubickaya Puscha =

Nature reserve and Ramsar site in Belarus

- Location: Belarus
- Coordinates: 55.02°N 28.06°E
- Area: 15,744 ha (60.79 sq mi)

Golubickaya Puscha (Belarusian: Галубіцкая пушча) is a nature reserve and a Ramsar site in Belarus, located in Gluboksky and Dokshitsy districts of Vitebsk region. Golubickaya Puscha borders the Berezinsky Biosphere Reserve. Together they form one of the largest European meadow-marsh complexes and biodiversity reserves of wetland flora and fauna.

== Profile ==
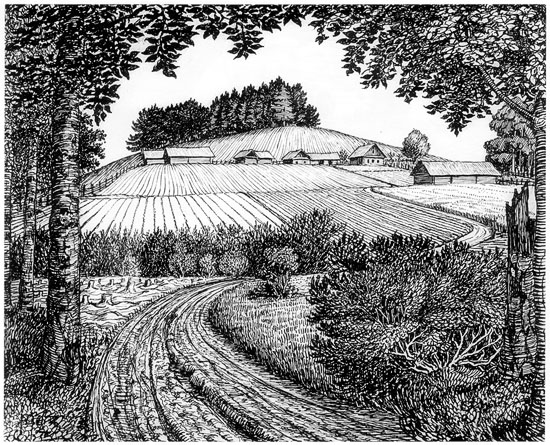
Golubickaya Puscha by Jazep Drazdovič, 1923

A landscape-hydrological reserve Golubitskaya Pushcha with an area of 6,734 ha in the floodplain of the Berezina River in Dokshitsky and Gluboksky districts of Vitebsk Region was established on 10 December, 1998. On 29 December, 2014, by decision of the local district executive committees its status was changed and Golubitskaya Pushcha became a biological reserve, its area in the new boundaries reduced to 6169 ha.

The Reserve is located in the Upper Berezinskaya lowland and borders the Berezinski Biosphere Reserve and the Berezina River Floodplain. Together they form one of the largest meadow-marsh complexes in Europe and act as a reserve of biodiversity of wetland flora and fauna.

The total area of the territory is 15,744 ha and includes water bodies, wetlands, meadows and forests.

The reserve is home to 24 red-listed bird and 2 mammal species. Permanent populations of brown bear, grouse, osprey, buzzard, golden eagle, long-tailed owl, and others are registered here. Local flora also includes 9 species of endangered higher plants.

Jazep Drazdovič was born on the farm Punki in Golubickaya Pushcha.

== Sources ==
- Суверенная Беларусь: иллюстрированная история государства, 1991-2008 [Sovereign Belarus: An Illustrated History of the State, 1991-2008] (in Russian). 2008. p. 64.
- Ivanovsky, V. V. (2004). "Birds of prey of upland bogs of the Belarusian Lakeland" (PDF). Russian Journal of Ornithology (in Russian). 13 (271): 812–814.
- Grichik, V. V.; Rak, A. V.; Mindlin, G. A. (2019). "Remarkable nesting fact of the osprey Pandion haliaetus". Russian Journal of Ornithology. XXVIII (1837): 4917–4919.
- Lokotko, A. (2018). Маршруты белорусского туризма: историко-культурные ландшафты Беларуси (Routes of Belarusian tourism: historical and cultural landscapes of Belarus). Беларуская навука. p. 75.
