= Jazep Drazdovič =

Belarusian artist (1888-1954)

- Язэп Драздовіч
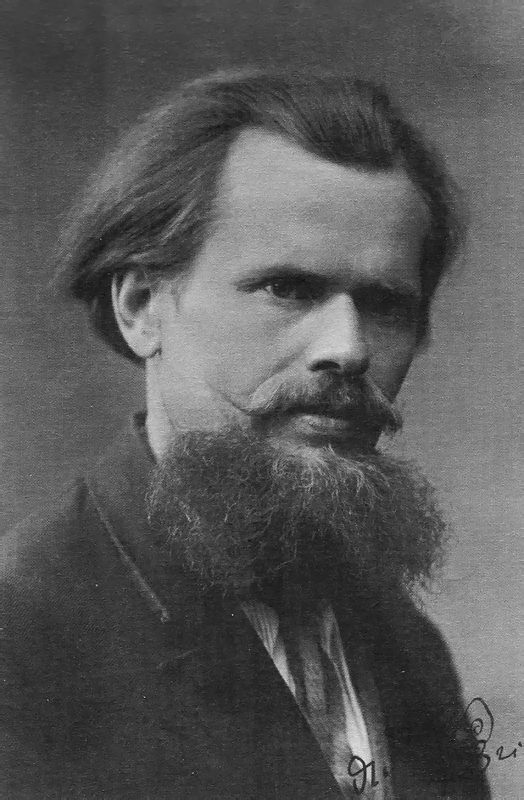
- Drazdovič in 1928
- Born: 13 October 1888; Puńki, Disna uezd, Vilna Governorate, Russian Empire
- Died: 15 September 1954 (aged 65); Hlybokaye District, Belarusian SSR

Jazep Drazdovič (Note: His name is sometimes given as Iosif, but it is unclear whether Jazep or Iosif was his birth name.) (1888–1954, Belarusian: Язэп Нарцызавіч Драздовіч) was a Belarusian painter, graphic artist, writer, archaeologist and ethnographer. His works include drawings of Belarusian historic towns and architecture, painted wall carpets, and cycles depicting imagined life on the Moon, Mars and Saturn.

Born into an impoverished noble family in the Vilna Governorate of the Russian Empire, Drazdovič studied drawing in Vilna under Ivan Trutnev and served as a military feldsher during the First World War. He subsequently taught drawing and participated in Belarusian cultural and educational activity in Minsk and interwar Poland. He worked with the Ivan Lutskyevich Belarusian Museum, contributing artworks, ethnographic records and archaeological finds. From the 1930s he spent much of his life travelling between villages in his native Disna region, supporting himself largely by painting decorative wall carpets for villagers.

Drazdovič also collected folklore and regional vocabulary, conducted archaeological fieldwork, and wrote fiction, poetry, diaries and works on astronomy. He created cosmic paintings and detailed written accounts of journeys he believed he made in dreams, which he regarded as a form of scientific observation.

Drazdovič died in 1954, after local villagers found him unconscious on a road. His first solo exhibition was held posthumously in 1979. Interest in his life and work increased after the publication of Arseny Lis's biography Vechny vandrounik (The Eternal Wanderer) in 1984. His works and manuscripts are preserved in museums in Belarus and Lithuania.

== Biography ==
=== Early life ===
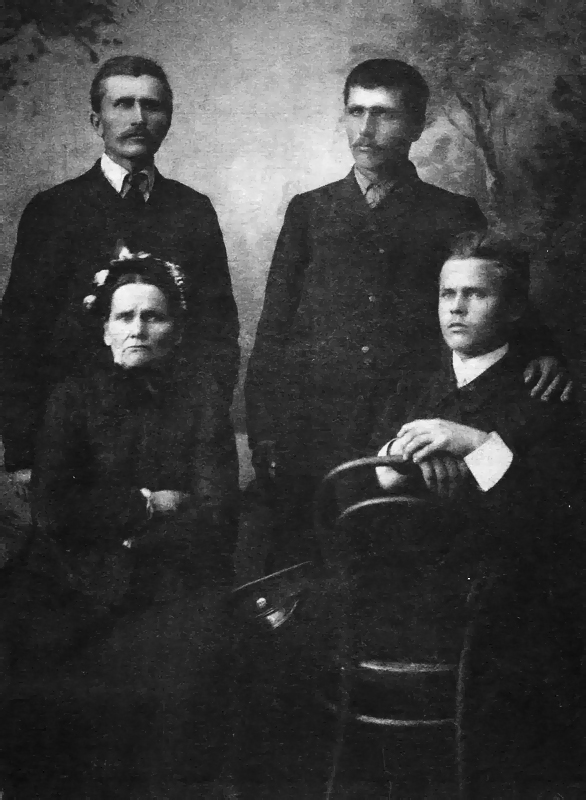
Yazep Drazdovich with his mother and elder brothers. Disna, 1907

Jazep Drazdovič was born on 13 October [O.S. 1 October] 1888 in the village Punki, Disna uezd, Vilna Governorate, into the family of an impoverished nobleman, Narciz Drazdovich. (Note: Drazdovich's genealogical tree and a copy of the resolution of the Minsk Noble Deputy Assembly on the recognition of the Drozdovich family as a noble family are preserved in the Drazdovich archive.) He had four brothers and a sister. When he was two, his father died, and the children were raised by their mother. She sold Punki and the landless family subsequently moved frequently between rented homes.

Drazdovich was first educated at Disna. In 1906 he moved to Vilna and entered the drawing school founded and directed by the Russian painter Ivan Trutnev. He graduated in 1908.

In 1908 his first short article was published by Nasha Niva. When the newspaper decided to issue its first Belarusian calendar the following year, Drazdovich was commissioned to design the cover of the First Belarusian Calendar for 1910.

Drazdovich in the army, 1917

In 1910 he was drafted into the Russian army. After two years of service in Saratov, he graduated from paramedic courses and became a military feldsher.

Drazdovich served as a feldsher during the First World War. In 1917 he was diagnosed with neurasthenia.

=== After the Revolution ===
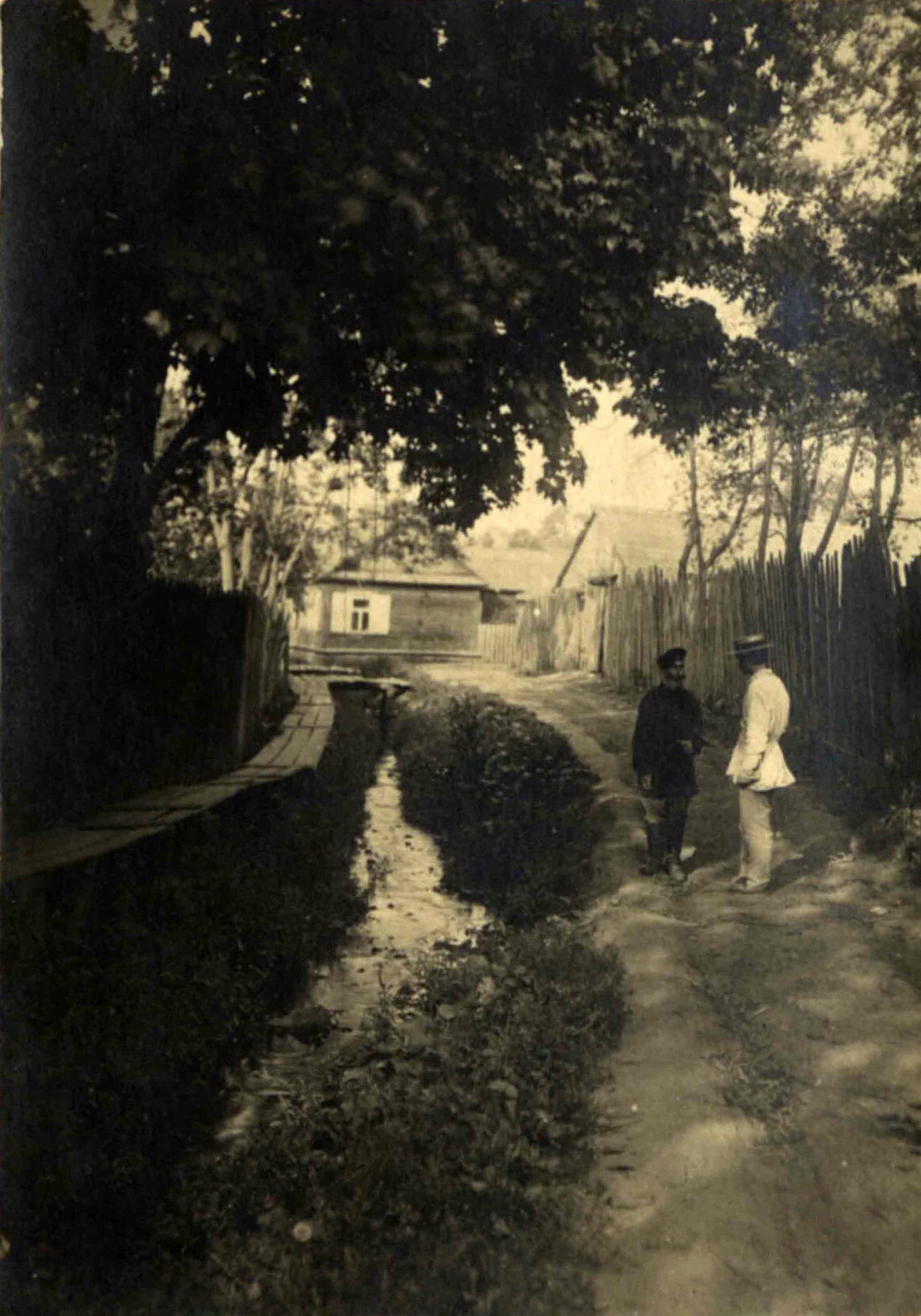
Drazdovich (right) near the source of the Niamiha river, June 1920, photographed by Lev Dashkevich.

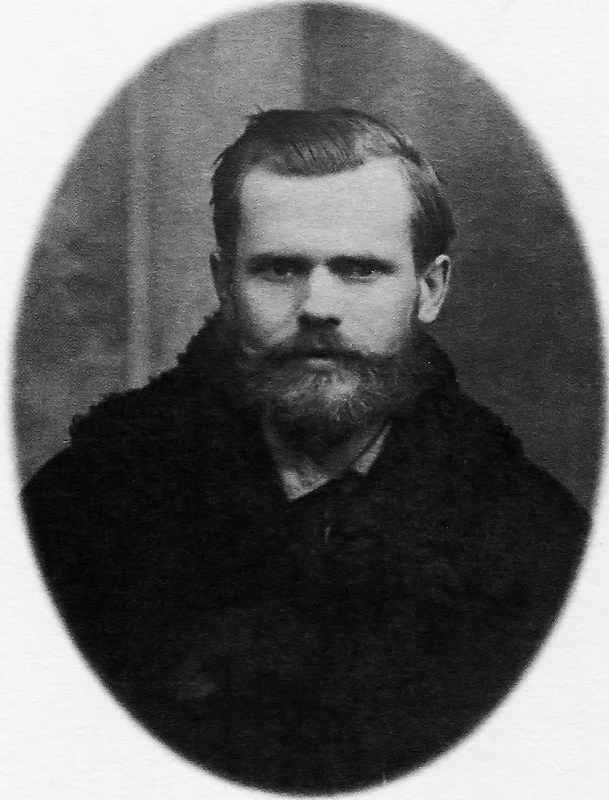
Drazdovich at Belarusian teachers' courses in Minsk, 1920

In 1917 Drazdovich returned to the Disna region and lived with relatives at the Lyavonaŭka estate near Hermanavichy. He contributed reports about local rural life to Nasha Niva. He also proposed the creation of an art academy in a letter to Anton Hrynevich and helped establish a local library and amateur theatre.

In 1919, after the establishment of Soviet Belarus, Drazdovich moved to Minsk. There he worked as an illustrator, taught drawing, illustrated publications and participated in the cultural and educational society Zaranka, which organised schools, a theatre and a library.

During the Polish occupation of Minsk in 1919–1920, he cooperated with the Belarusian National Committee and the Belarusian Military Commission and contributed artworks to several periodicals.

While in Minsk he produced a series of drawings of the city's historic districts, including the Castle District, Upper Market and Tatar Suburb. Such documentation of architecture and historic sites became an important part of his graphic work, often accompanied by the collection of historical and archaeological information. He also studied the course of the Nyamiha river and carried out archaeological work at Zaslawye and Svir.

=== The 1920s ===
After the Red Army retook Minsk in July 1920, Drazdovich taught at the 13th and 15th secondary schools. From August until late October he also worked as an artist and illustrator for the People's Commissariat of Education of the BSSR.

After completing teacher-training courses in late 1920, Drazdovich returned to the Disna region. The region subsequently became part of the Second Polish Republic under the Peace of Riga. He worked as a cooperative employee in 1921–1924 and continued Belarusian cultural and educational activity. In 1921 he organised a Belarusian school in the village of Stalitsa. The school has been closed by the Polish administration after one month.

Drazdovich also began writing fiction. In 1920–1922 he worked on the unfinished historical novel Haradolskaya Pushcha, which combined a First World War frame narrative with a story about the medieval inhabitants of the Polotsk region. In 1923 he published Vyalikaya shyshka with his own cover illustration under the pseudonym Iosif Nartsizov. Petuhova calls it as the first part of a larger planned prose cycle, preceded by the prologue Pabratimtsy.

He cooperated extensively with the Ivan Lutskyevich Belarusian Museum in Vilnius. He gave the museum works of art, folklore records, notes and material from his archaeological research; much of his surviving work of the 1920s and 1930s was preserved through this association. Drazdovich also conducted archaeological excavations, documented his finds and transferred artefacts to the museum. In 1926 he undertook an expedition to the Pinsk region. During the following two years he travelled through Trakai, Vilnius, Medininkai, Kreva, Halshany, Lida, Navahrudak, Lyubcha and Mir, producing albums of drawings.

Around this period Drazdovich was arrested for the first time, and spent three days in police custody for alleged "counter-propaganda" during a census.

Drazdovich with pupils of the Belarusian Gymnasium in Radaškovičy, c. 1927

Drazdovich in the art studio of the Belarusian Gymnasium in Vilnius; Rygor Shirma is in the centre, 1926–1927

From 1924 to 1926 Drazdovich taught drawing at a Polish school in Hlybokaye and cooperated with the Belarusian School Society. He later worked at the Belarusian Gymnasium in Radaškovičy. In 1926–1927 he contributed to the satirical magazine Malanka. In 1927 he founded an art studio at the Belarusian Gymnasium in Vilnius. He subsequently taught drawing at the Belarusian Gymnasium in Navahrudak. His teaching methods were not always well received: in September 1929 the parents' committee of the Navahrudak gymnasium formally criticised his influence on the pupils and his relations with the school's administration.

From 1926 Drazdovich maintained regular contacts with Minsk, particularly with the Institute of Belarusian Culture, later reorganised as the Belarusian Academy of Sciences. He sent drawings and measurements of wooden architecture and objects of rural material culture.

In the early 1930s he briefly worked in the Białystok region at the invitation of the Belarusian School Society, designing amateur theatrical productions and participating in the cooperative publishing house Siauba.

Astronomy and cosmology became one of Drazdovich's major interests. In 1931 he published the Belarusian-language book Nyabesnyya behi (Celestial Courses) in Vilnius, illustrated with his own linocuts. He also developed his own theories of the Solar System, later working on such texts as Harmony of the Planets of the Solar System, Conversations on Astronomy and Where Are We and Who Are We.

=== Disna period ===
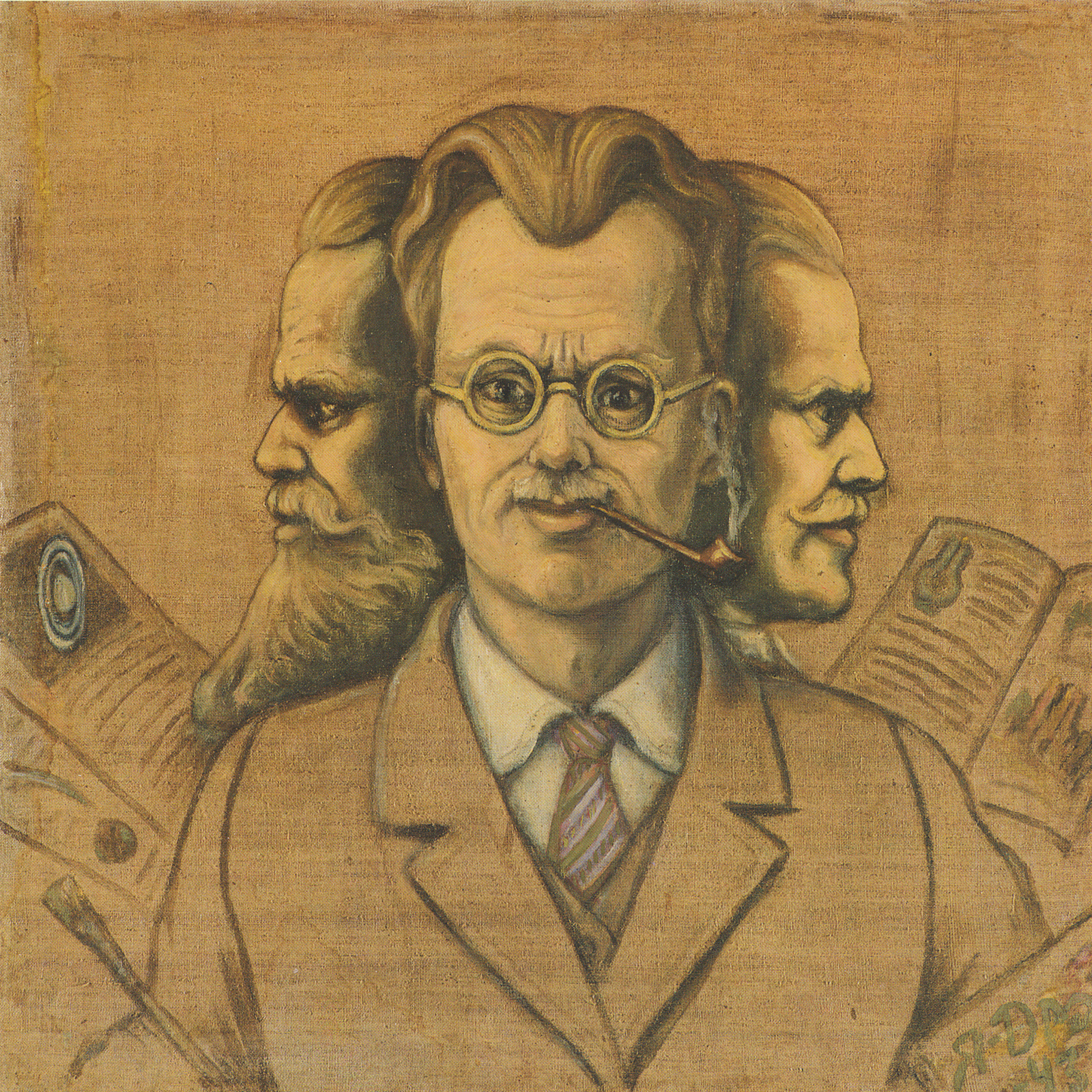
Self-portrait, 1943

In 1933 Drazdovich moved to his elder brother Kanstantsin in the Disna region. He made wood carvings and earned money by travelling between villages and painting decorative wall carpets, portraits, landscapes and ornaments. He regarded this work partly as a means of developing artistic and aesthetic taste among villagers. During these stays local people frequently questioned him about astronomy, and in his diary he recorded giving about fifty "modelled lectures on astronomy" in 1934, sometimes using household objects to demonstrate astronomical phenomena.

After Western Belarus was incorporated into the BSSR in 1939, Drazdovich attended short teacher-training courses and in 1940–1941 taught in Hlybokaye and Luzhki. Because of a shortage of teachers, he taught several subjects, including drawing, history, botany and astronomy.

His teaching career ended after the German invasion of the Soviet Union in 1941. During the German occupation he continued to paint.

After the war, declining health limited his work. He mainly supported himself by painting decorative wall carpets for villagers, with occasional landscapes and portraits.

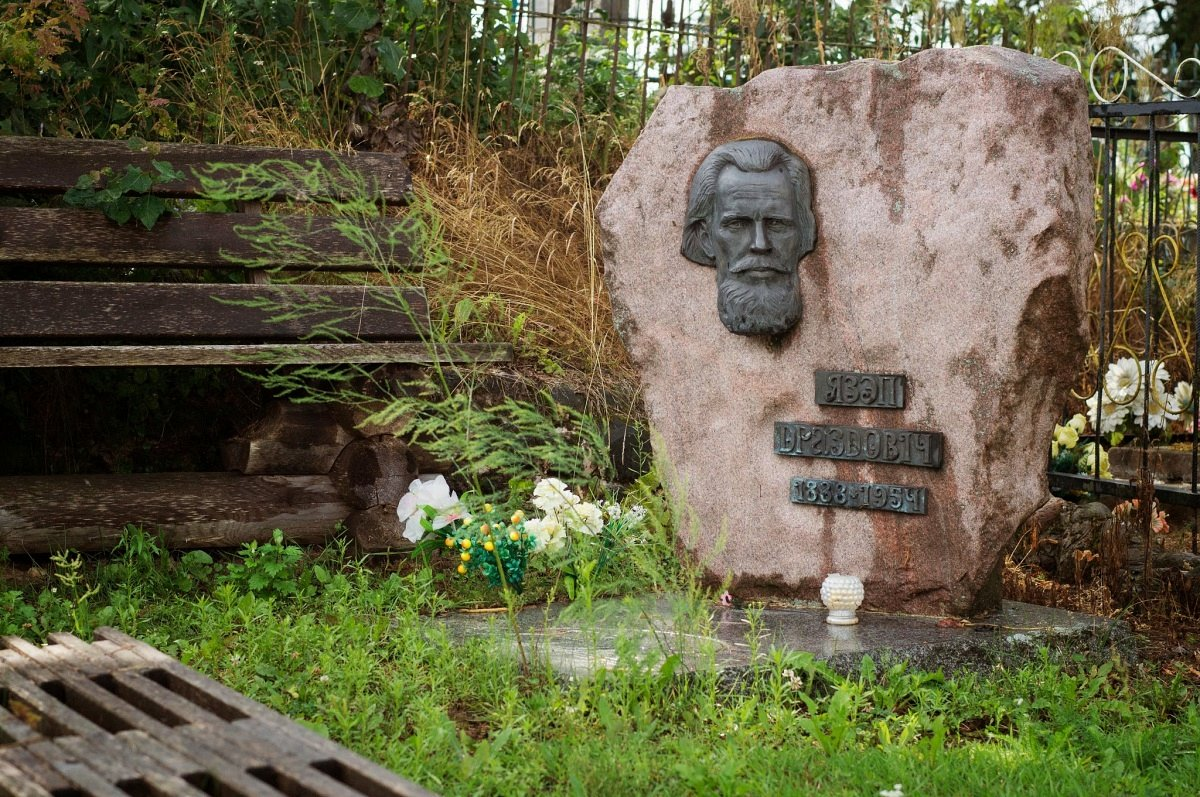
Drazdovich's grave between the villages of Liplyani and Malyya Davydki

In 1954 villagers found Drazdovich unconscious on a country road. He was taken to a nearest hospital where he died on 15 September without regaining consciousness, The official record gives the cause of death as stomach cancer. He was buried in a cemetery between the villages of Liplyani and Malyya Davydki. In 1982 a memorial stele with a relief of the "eternal wanderer", created by sculptor Ales Shaternik, was erected on his grave.

Drazdovich never married and had no children.

== Work ==
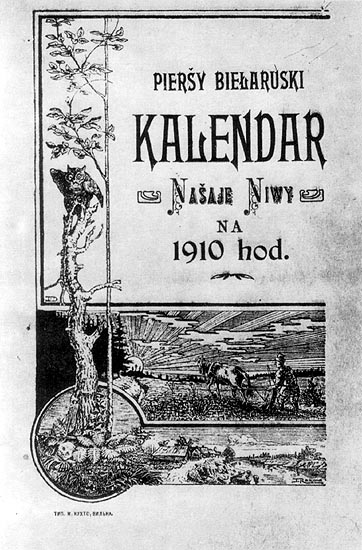
Cover of the First Belarusian Calendar for 1910, designed by Drazdovich

Drazdovich worked across painting, drawing, literature, archaeology, ethnography, lexicography, folklore collecting and popular astronomy. He collected folklore and regional vocabulary from the Disna and Pinsk areas and compiled the collection Songs of the Disna Region. He also wrote poetry, prose, diaries and memoirs.

Petuhova calls his story Varyat bez varyatstva ('Madman without madness') as the planned third part of a larger five-part prose work; only the prologue Pabratimtsy and the first part, Vyalikaya shyshka, were published, while the remaining sections survive only in sketches. Vyalikaya shyshka is Drazdovich's first published literary-artistic work.

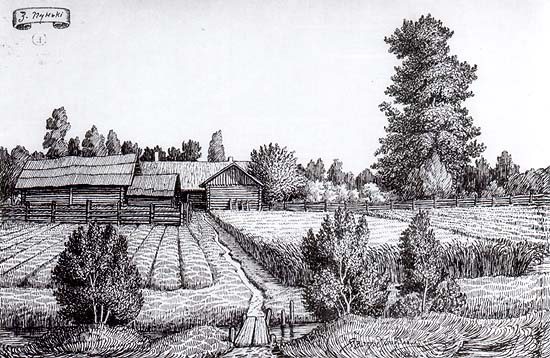
A drawing of Punki, Drazdovich's birthplace, 1922

Much of his literary work remained unpublished. Among his unfinished or manuscript works were the historical novel Haradolskaya Pushcha, the poem Tryzna minuwshchyny and a variety of prose, poetic and fantastic sketches. Tryzna minuwshchyny, begun in 1936 under the working title Songs of the Past, or Belarus from Ancient Times, presents Belarusian history from prehistoric times through the revolutionary era in the form of a cycle of historically themed songs. Haradolskaya Pushcha is the novel set in the First World War and the Middle Ages; Vytautas and Jogaila appear in its medieval narrative.

Drazdovich also conducted archaeological fieldwork. He documented excavations and finds, collected local legends and traditions, and produced albums including Haradolnya, Disna Prehistoric Antiquities and Starasvechchyna. He also wrote the article Where Are Dudutki and Harodnya, Mentioned in The Tale of Igor's Campaign?, in which he proposed his own identification of the historical Dudutki.

His diaries and memoirs constitute an important part of his literary legacy. The Diary was published in 1991–1992, while his Memoirs of Military Life appeared in print in 2014. They contain recollections of cultural figures such as Vaclaw Lastowski, Ryhor Shyrma, Yanka Pachopka, Anton Hrynevich, Mikhas Mashara, Anton Luckievich and others, as well as accounts of Belarusian cultural life in Vilnius and Białystok.

Drazdovich was particularly highly regarded by contemporaries as a graphic artist. His graphic work included portraits, allegorical and fantastic compositions and extensive documentary series devoted to architecture, historic towns and archaeological sites. During his journeys he drew Vilnius, Minsk, Mir, Navahrudak, Pinsk, Halshany, Lida, Kreva and numerous villages. He avoided distant travel and repeatedly returned to his native Disna region.

=== Cosmic art and cosmology ===
Nyabesnyya behi (1931)

Drazdovich devoted a substantial part of his art to the cosmos. Petuhova estimates that more than one hundred of his paintings and drawings on cosmic subjects are known, while his prose descriptions, maps and theoretical writings developed in parallel with the images. Drazdovich believed that he possessed a form of clairvoyance and described making "astral" or "somnambulistic" journeys in dreams to the Moon, Mars, Saturn and Venus. After waking he recorded what he believed he had seen in notebooks and albums, producing maps, landscapes, architectural studies and drawings of extraterrestrial plants, animals and inhabitants; some of these drawings were later developed into paintings. He regarded this material not as artistic fantasy but as a form of scientific observation that could be verified by astronomical observations.

The visual and written works were organised into interconnected cycles. In 1931–1932 Drazdovich developed Life on Mars, depicting a densely inhabited and technologically developed world of cities, palaces, universities, observatories, museums, theatres, hospitals, laboratories and workshops. His Saturn cycle of 1931–1932 included paintings such as Cosmopolis. Port of Celestial Space on the Ring of Saturn, Astran – Observatory with a Quadrant on the Ring of Saturn, Meeting Spring on Saturn and Saturnian Women Inspect Their Winter Caves, and a manuscript cycle he called "somnambulistic-televisual sketches". Petuhova describes the Saturn cycle as his most lyrical and emotional cosmic series, in which images of the distant planet repeatedly lead back to memories of Belarus and to Drazdovich's own sense of loneliness. Archipova likewise notes that the apparently exotic inhabitants, architecture and natural conditions of his other planets were repeatedly interpreted through comparisons with familiar Belarusian life.

The cycle Life on the Moon, developed in 1931–1933, is much darker. Its fortified cities, walls, towers, abandoned catacombs and necropolises suggest warfare and past catastrophes; in contrast to the active life of Drazdovich's Mars, his Moon is frequently silent, empty and threatening. The written descriptions are important for interpreting the images: Archipova shows, for example, that texts and maps identify the three towers of the lunar city Trivezh as a necropolis rather than a temple and explain otherwise cryptic architectural forms in the paintings. Drazdovich continued worked on Venus and Uranus series later in life; the 1947 painting In the Coastal Cliffs belongs to the Life on Venus series. Drazdovich continued theoretical work on astronomy through the 1930s and regarded his cosmological research and cosmic art as among the central achievements of his life.

== Legacy ==
Viktar Smataŭ at the first exhibition of Drazdovich's works in 1979

During the Soviet period Drazdovich's work remained relatively neglected by official cultural institutions. The first personal exhibition of his works was held in 1979. Interest in his life and work increased substantially after writer Arseny Lis published the biography Vechny vandrounik (The Eternal Wanderer) in 1984.

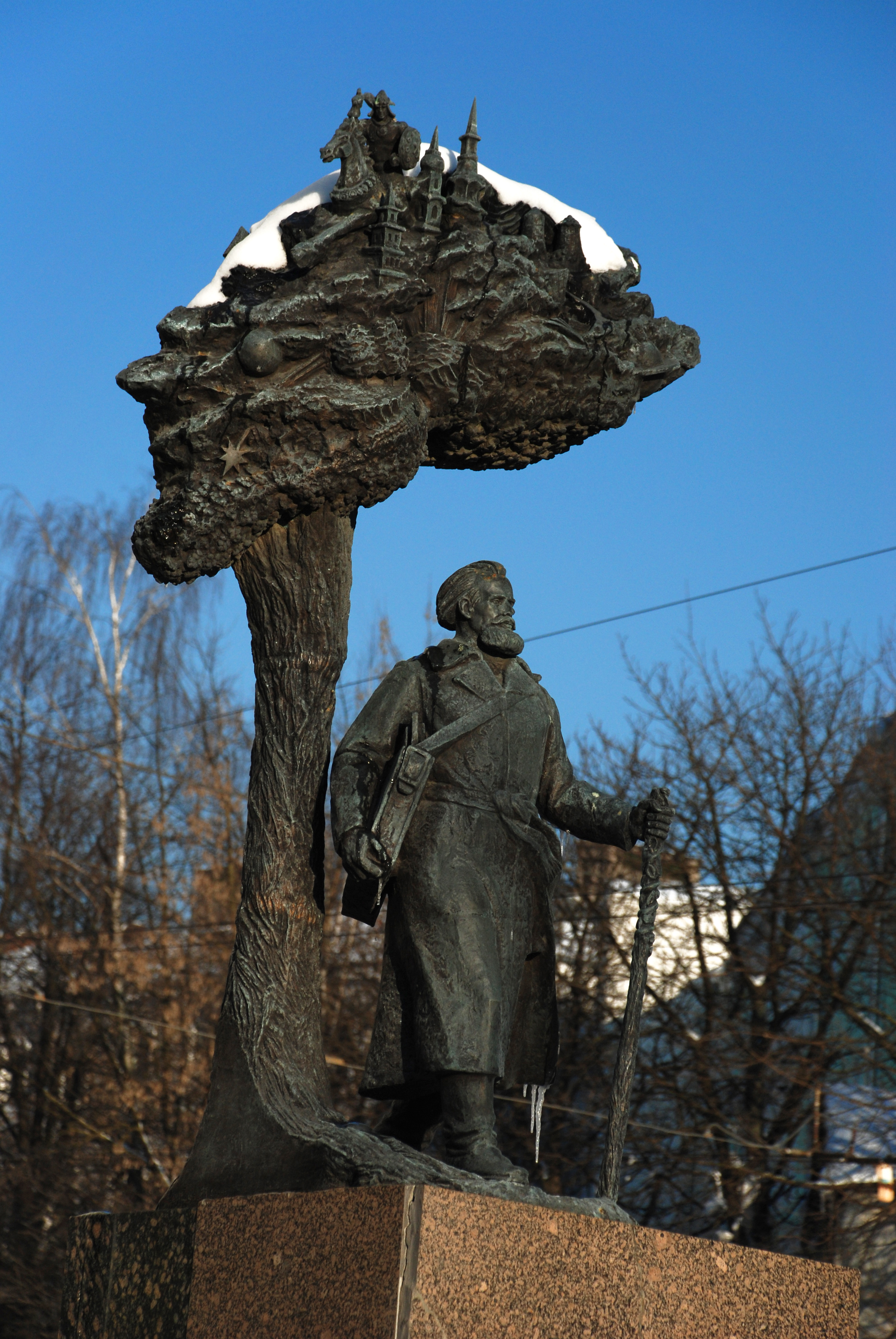
The Eternal Wanderer monument to Drazdovich in Minsk

Streets have been named after Drazdovich in Minsk, Orsha, Maladzyechna, Hlybokaye, Sharkawshchyna, Radaškovičy and Navahrudak. A monument to him by sculptor Ihar Holubeu stands in Minsk's Trinity Suburb since 1993. A bust was installed in Hlybokaye in 2012. In 2018 Drazdovich's grave was added to the Belarusian state list of historical and cultural heritage sites, and a memorial marker was erected at the site of his birthplace in Pun'ki.

Museum of art and ethnography in Hermanavichy, dedicated to Drazdovich, bear his name; it was founded in 1991 by a local teacher.

Works by Drazdovich are held by the National Museum of Lithuania, the Belarusian National History Museum, the National Art Museum of the Republic of Belarus, the Museum of Ancient Belarusian Culture, the Yakub Kolas Central Scientific Library, the Yakub Kolas State Literary and Memorial Museum, several regional museums and private collections. After the liquidation of the Ivan Lutskyevich Belarusian Museum its holdings were divided between Minsk and Vilnius: many of Drazdovich's paintings and drawings went to Belarusian institutions, while much of the textual documentation of his cosmic journeys, including the manuscript books Life on Mars and Life on Saturn, remained in the Wroblewski Library of the Lithuanian Academy of Sciences.

Drazdovich's personal archive was acquired by the library of the National Academy of Sciences.

== Gallery ==
=== Historical-themed works ===
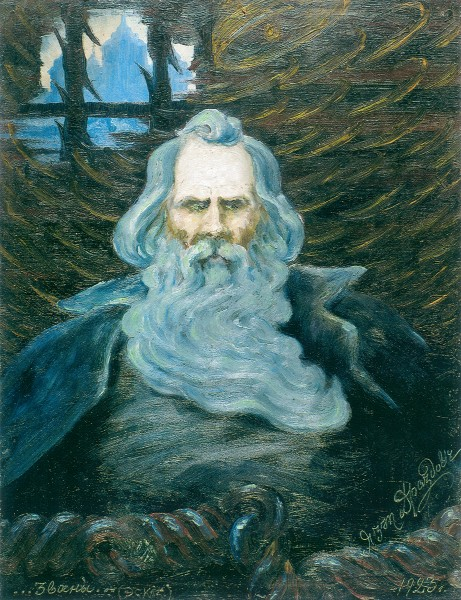
Усяслаў Полацкі ў парубе пад палатамі кіеўскага князя (Vseslav the Sorcerer), 1923

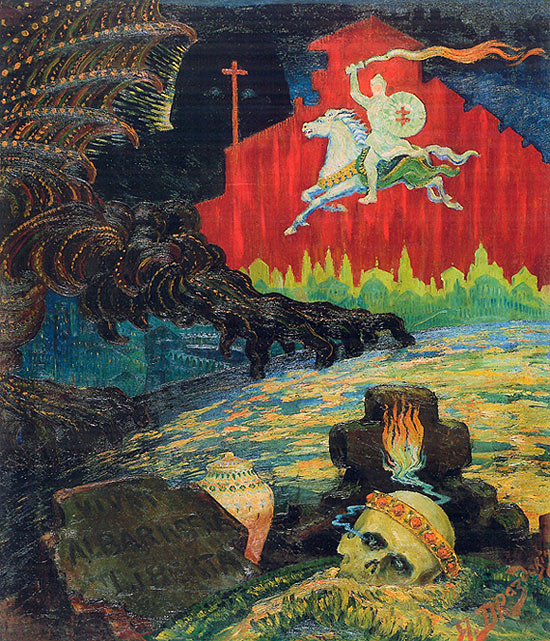
Пагоня (Pahonia), 1927

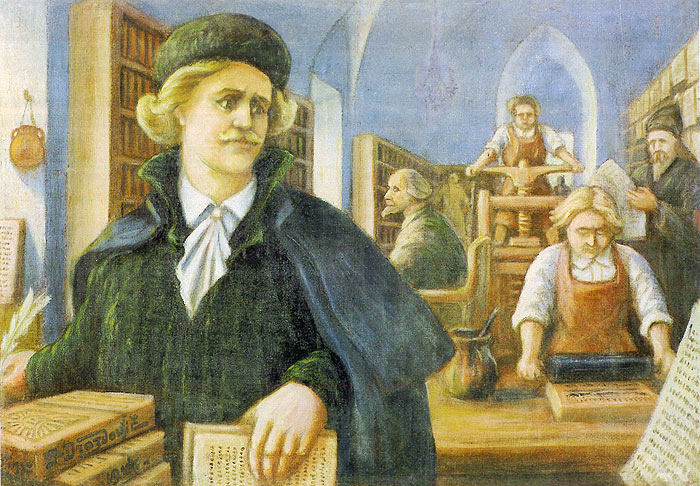
Друкарня Францішка Скарыны ў Вільні (Francysk Skarynas printing house in Vilnia), 1940–1943

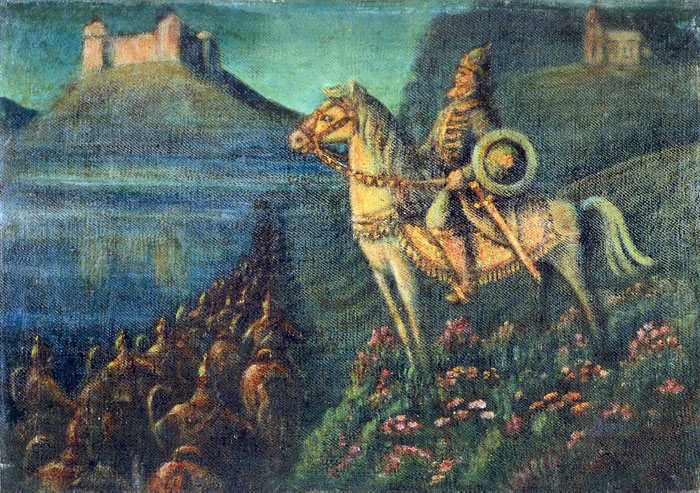
Усяслаў Чарадзей пад Гародняй (Vseslav the Sorcerer near Grodno), 1944

=== Architecture ===
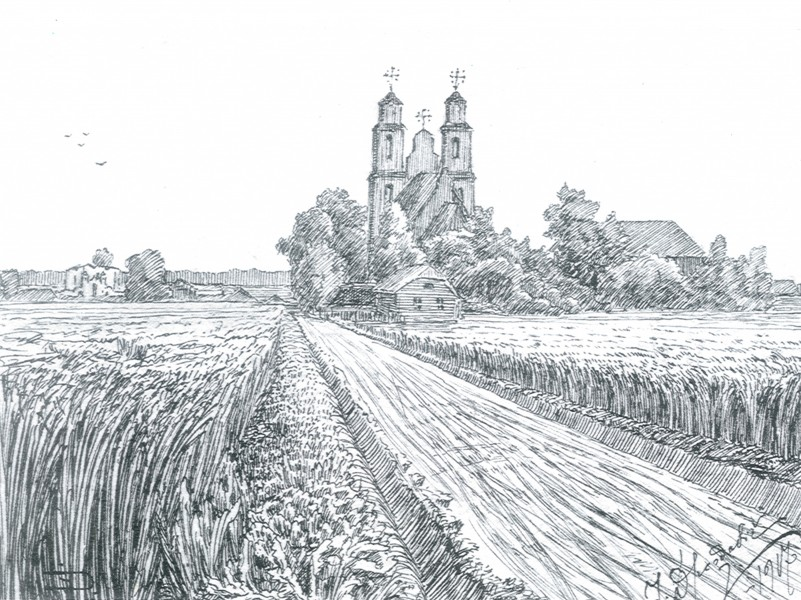
Германавічы. Касцёл (Hiermanavičy, Catholic church), 1917

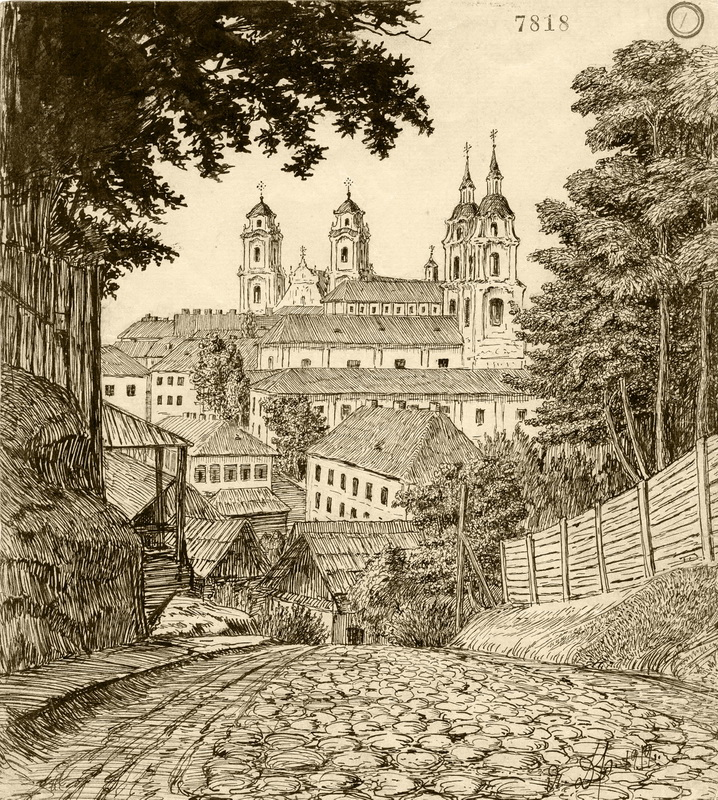
Менск. Выгляд са Шпітальна-Траецкага завулка (Minsk, view from Hospital-Troitskae street), 1919 г.

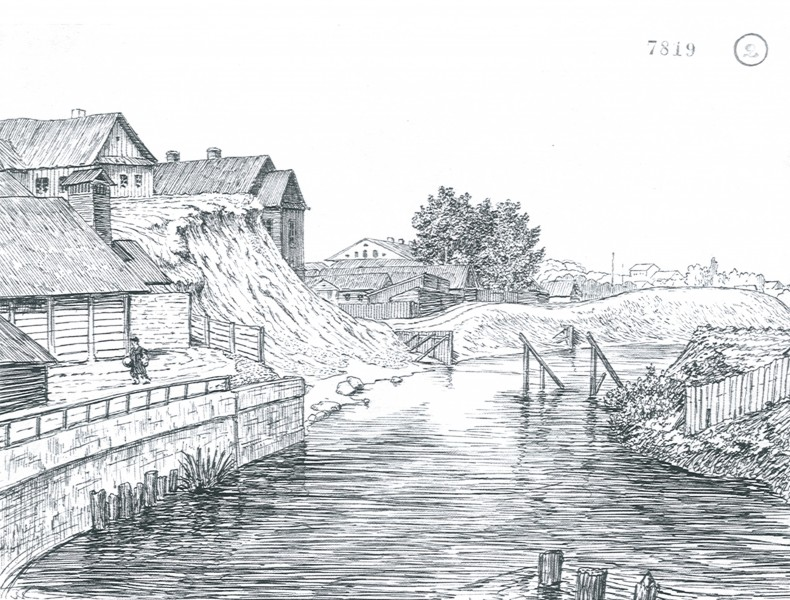
Менск. Абрыў Замкавай гары і прыбярэжная грэбля на правым беразе ракі Свіслач (Minsk, near Castle Hill and the Śvisłač river), 1920

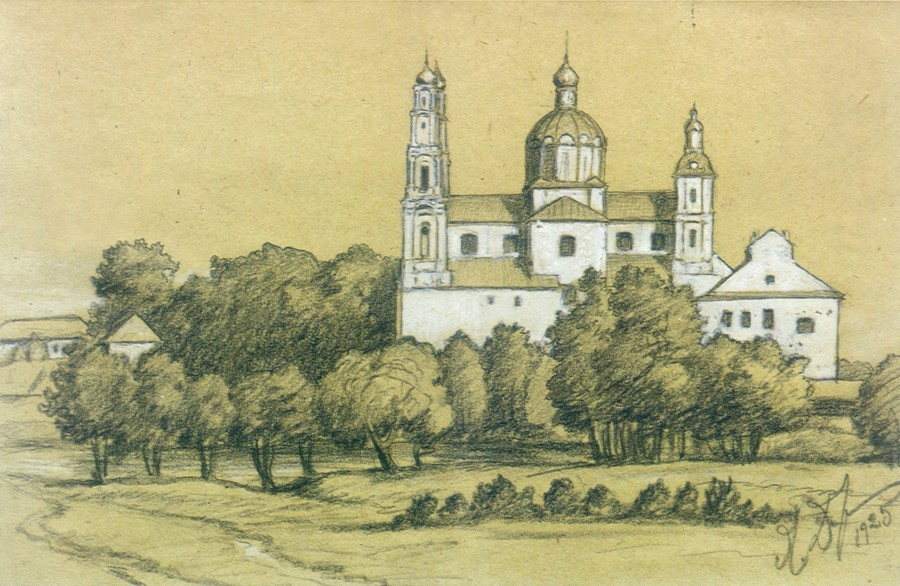
Глыбокае. Кармеліцкі касцёл і кляштар (Hłybokaje, Carmelite Catholic church), 1925

=== Cosmos ===
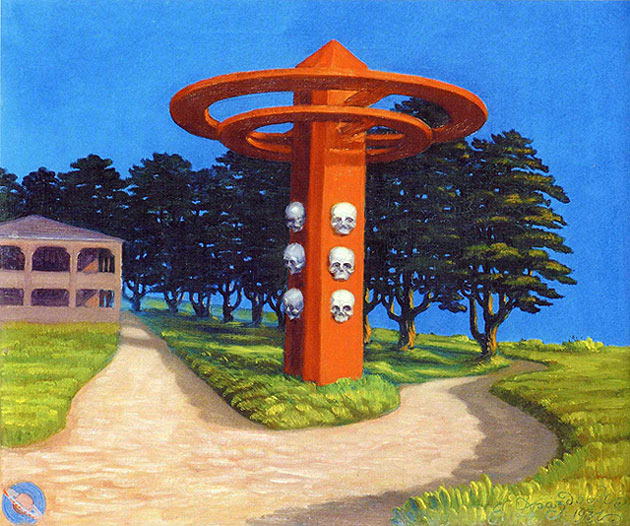
Над безданню (Upon abyss), 1931

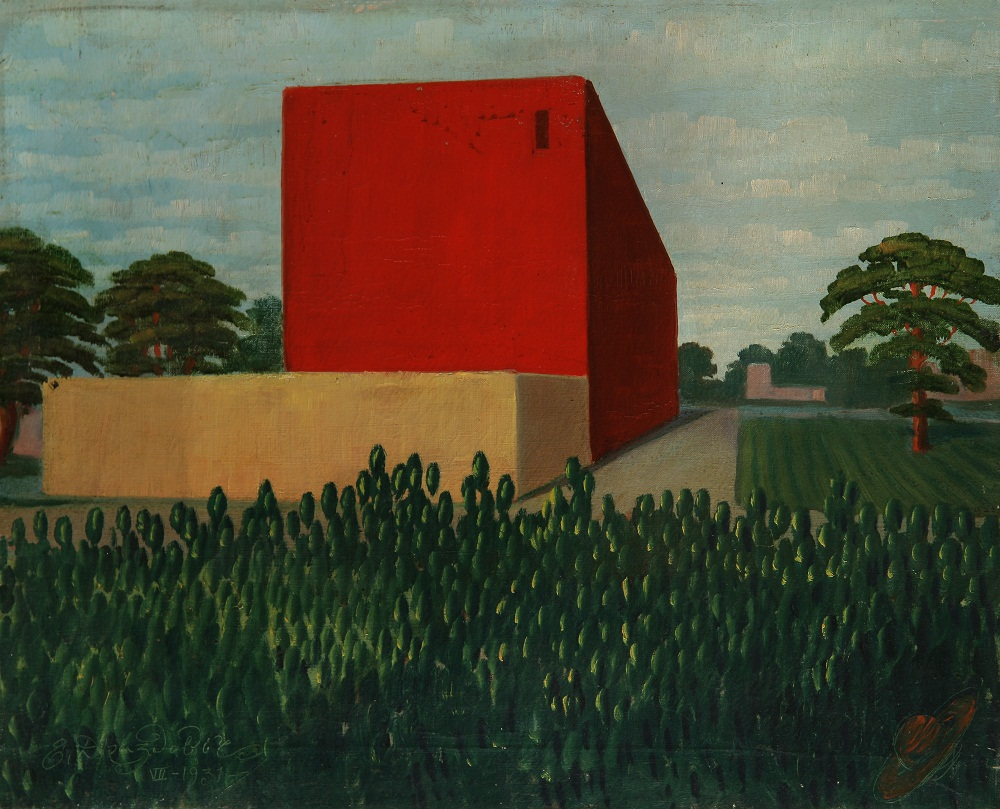
Абсерваторыя на кальцы Сатурна (Observatory on the ring of Saturn), 1931

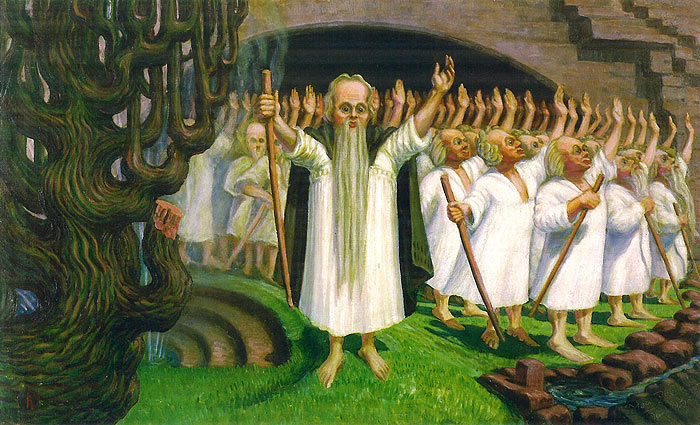
Сустрэча вясны на Сатурне (Welcoming spring coming on Saturn), 1931

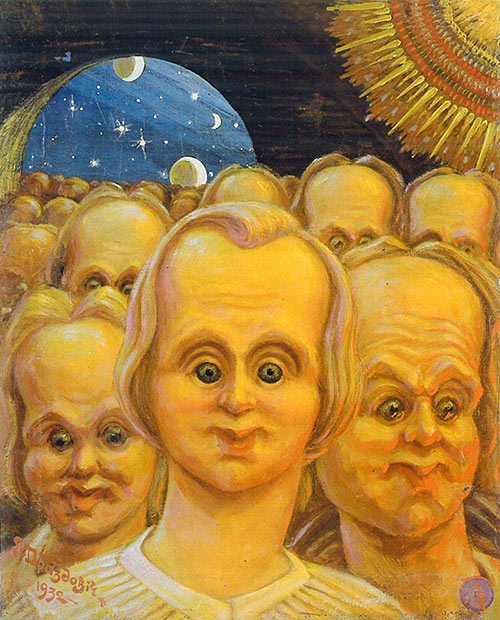
Агляд зімовых пячораў сатурнянамі (Saturnians watches their winter caves)

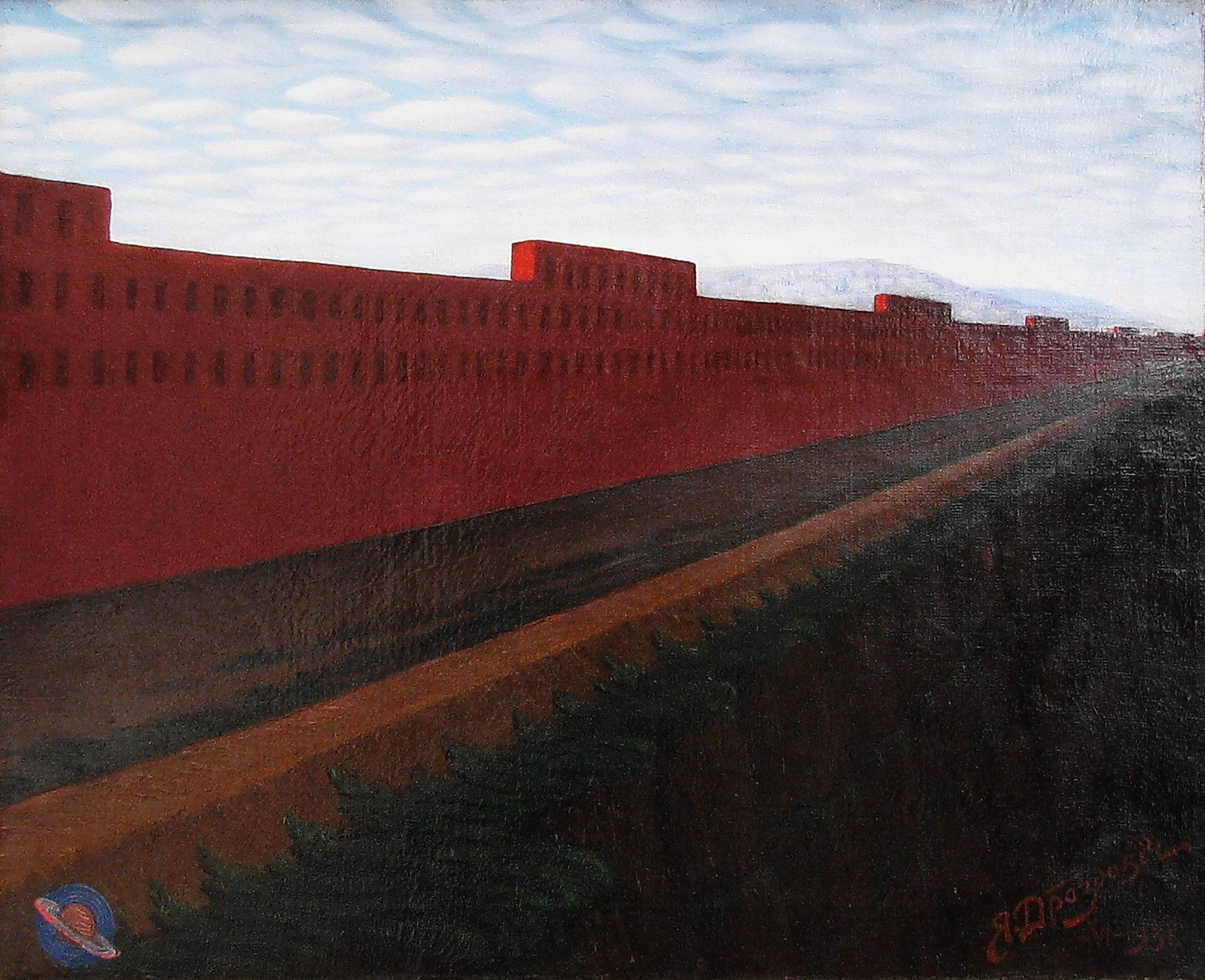
Cosmopolis. «Порт нябеснага прастору» на кольцы Сатурна (Cosmopolis. "Port of the sky" on the ring of Saturn)

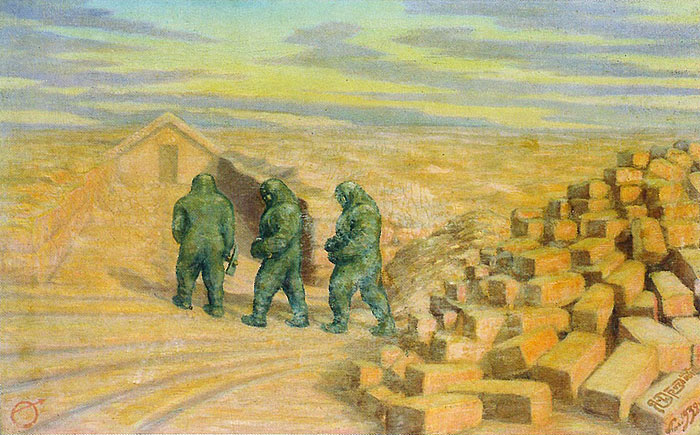
Вечар у пустэльні на Марсе (Evening in the Martian desert)

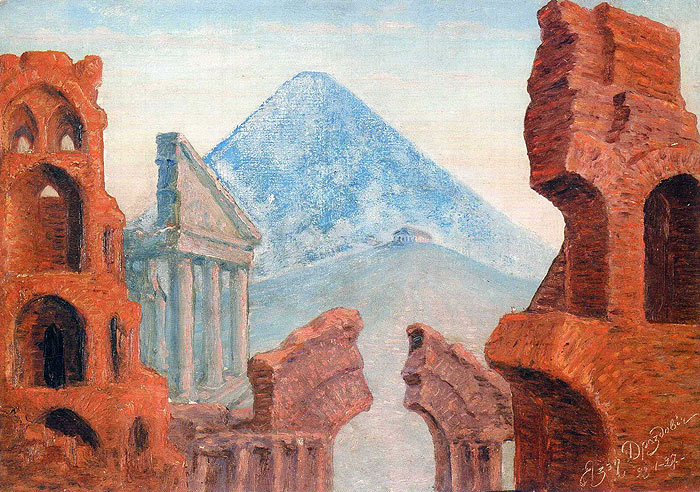
Мінулае (The Past)

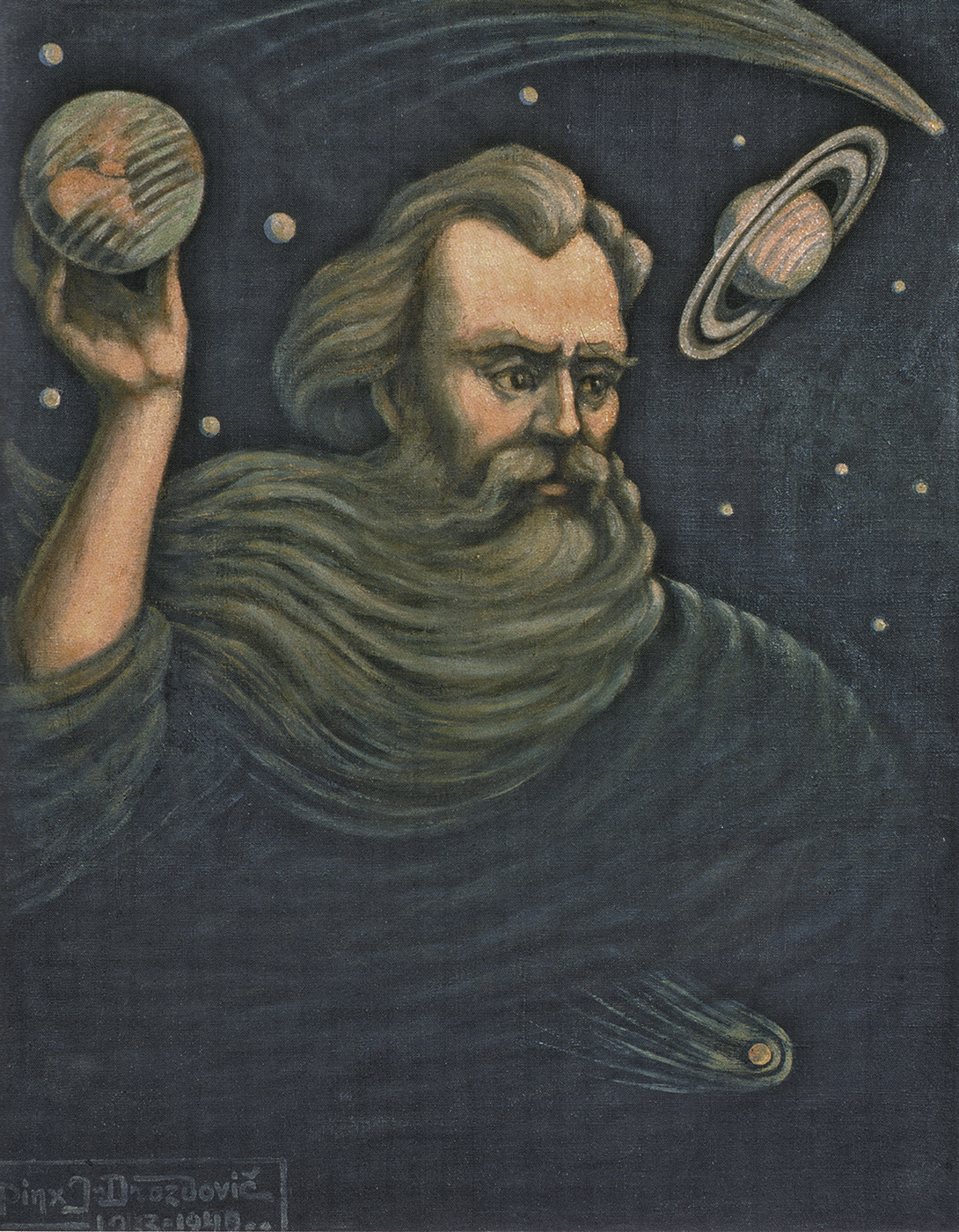
Космас (Cosmos), 1940–1943

=== Sceneries ===
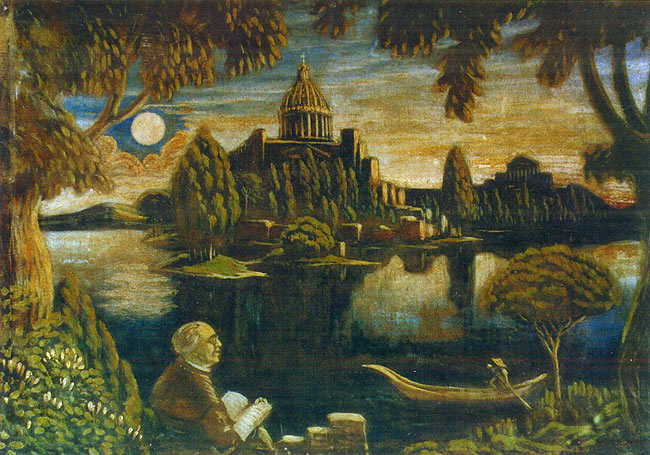
Далёкая краіна (A Far-Away Land), 1933

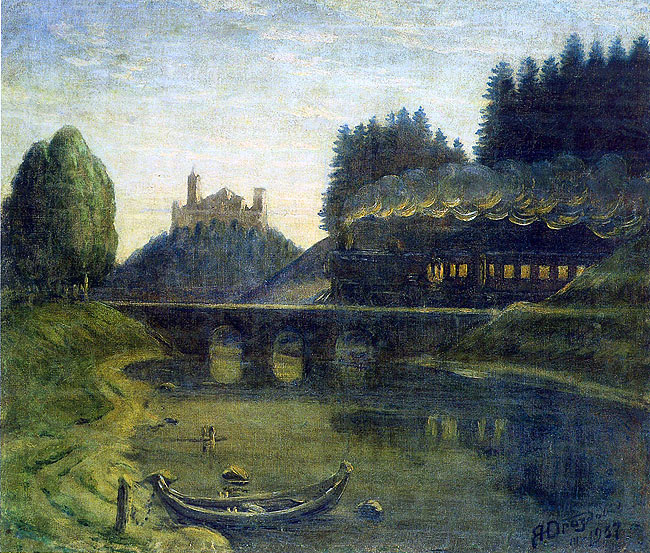
Краявід з цягніком (Scenery with a train), 1936

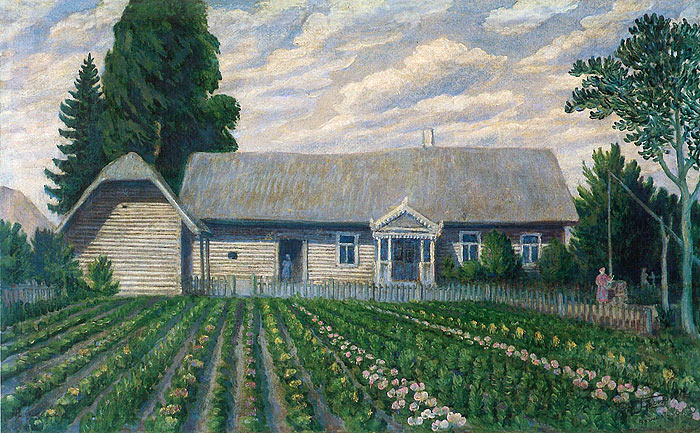
Ляскова (Laskova), 1936

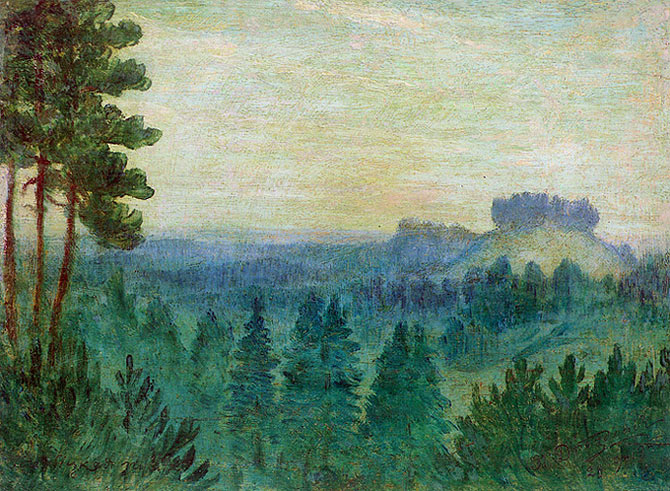
Гара Гарватка (Harvatka mountain), 1952

=== Carpets ===
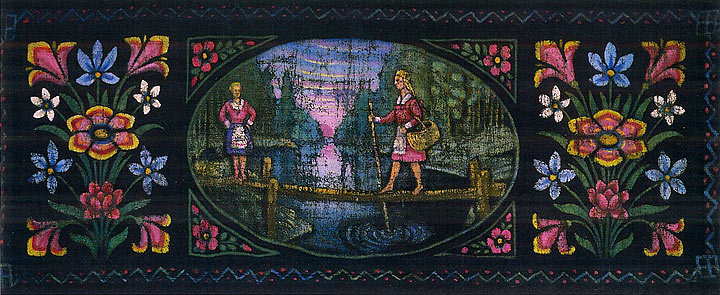
Дзве дзяўчыны на мастку (Two girls on a bridge), 1930s

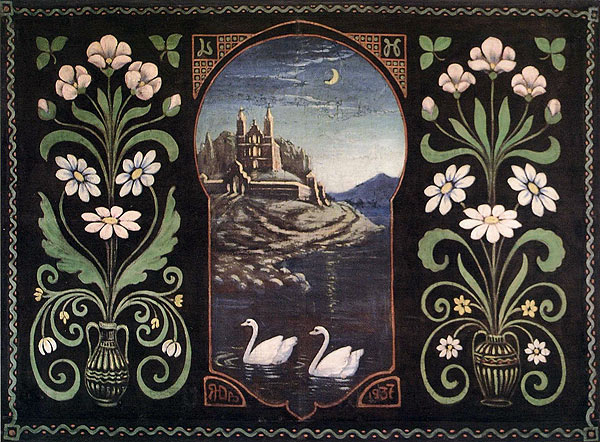
Месяцовая ноч (Moonlit night), 1937

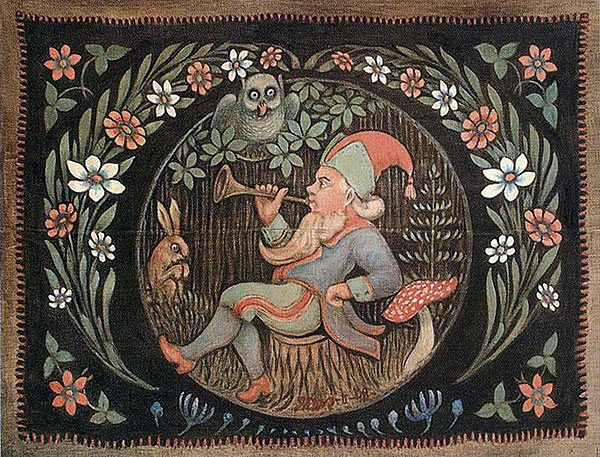
Красналюдка — казачнік-бай (Krasnaludka - storyteller), 1948

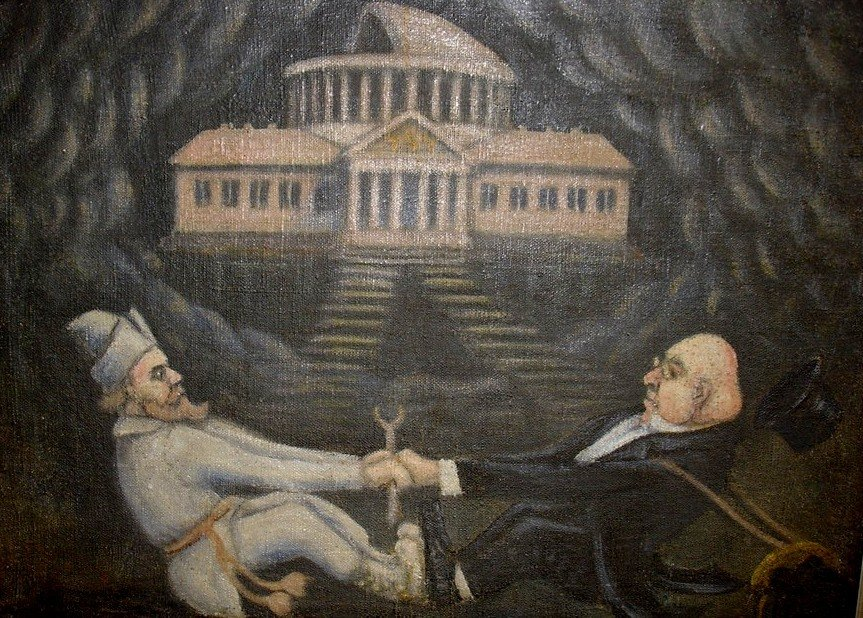
Як мужык з панам цягаецца (How a man competed with a landlord), 1930s

== Sources ==
- Archipova, Olga (2019). "Cosmic albums of Jazep Drozdovich". Menotyra (in Russian). 26 (4). Lithuanian Academy of Sciences: 215–233. doi:10.6001/menotyra.v26i4.4102. ISSN 2424-4708.
- Petuhova, Margaryta (2015). "Язэп Драздовiч – пiсьменнiк" (PDF). Białorutenistyka Białostocka (in Belarusian) (7). Wydawnictwo Uniwersytetu w Białymstoku: 107–130. ISSN 2081-2515.
- Kurtsova, Veranika N. (2025). "Linguistic heritage of Jazep Drazdovič – a bright representative of the Belarusian national revival of the 1st half of the 20th century". Vestnik of Kostroma State University (in Russian). 31 (1): 8–23. doi:10.34216/1998-0817-2025-31-1-8-23. ISSN 1998-0817.
