= Talaka =

Talaka (Belarusian: Талака) was a cultural and enlightenment youth organisation in Belarus during Soviet rule. It existed between 1985 and 1990 and was a predecessor and early part of the Perestroyka-inspired pro-independence movement in Soviet Belarus. Several key members of the Talaka later formed the Belarusian Popular Front.

Talaka was created in 1985 as an informal club for protection of historical architecture. Its creators were Siaržuk Vituška, Vincuk Viačorka (later chairman of the Partyja BNF), Viktar Ivaškievič (later one of the leaders of the Belarusian Popular Front and the Partyja BNF) and several others.

The club organised celebration of traditional holidays, revived traditional ceremonies, participated in archaeologic research. It was active in Samizdat publishing. Towards end of the 1980s the group started to more actively participate in pro-democracy and pro-independence political activities.

== Gallery ==
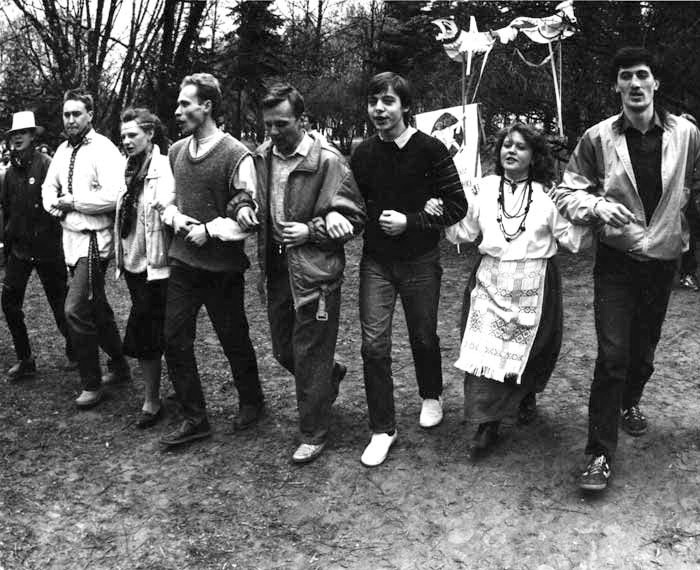
Spring celebration, 1990

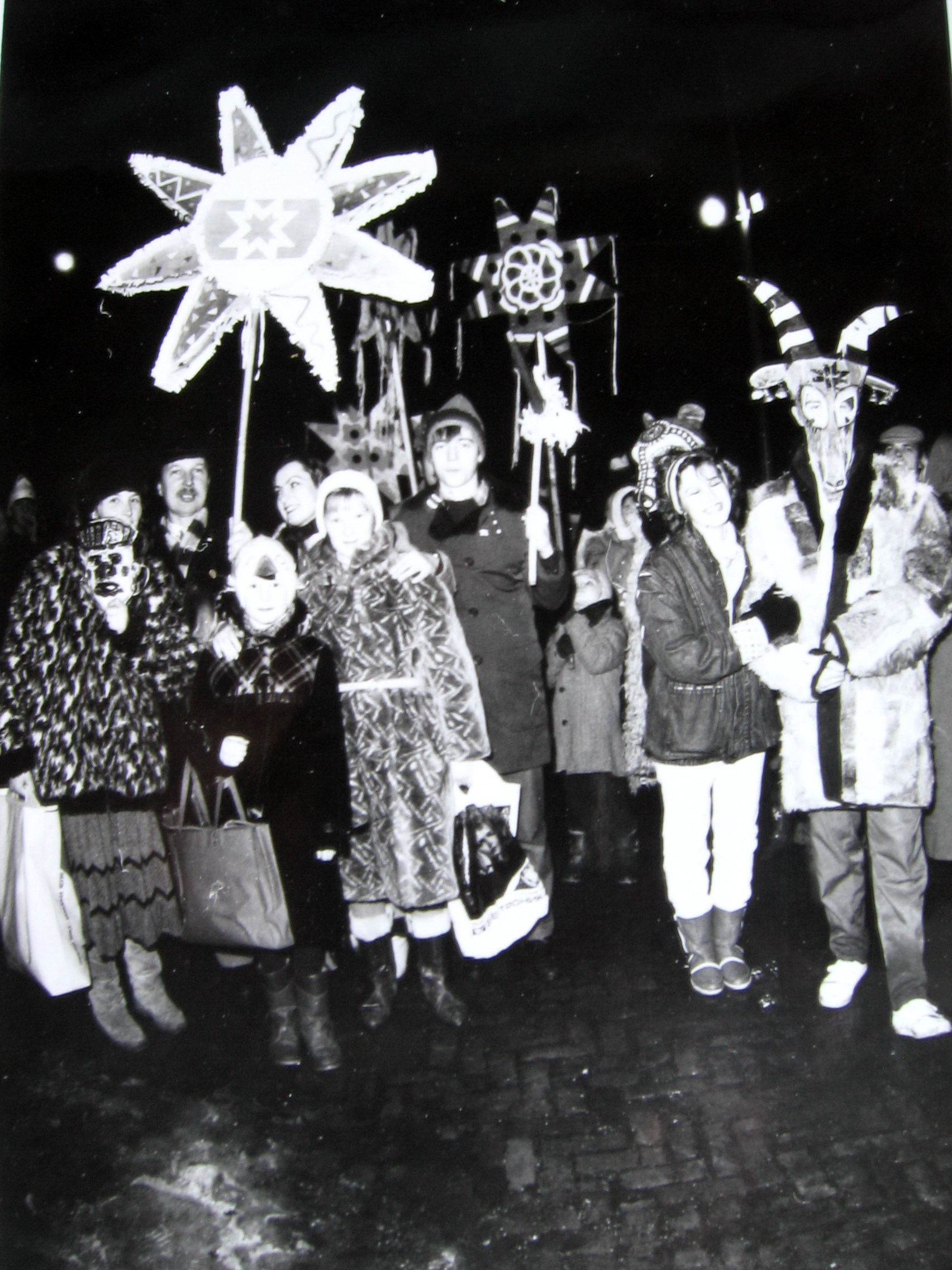
Kalyady, 1989

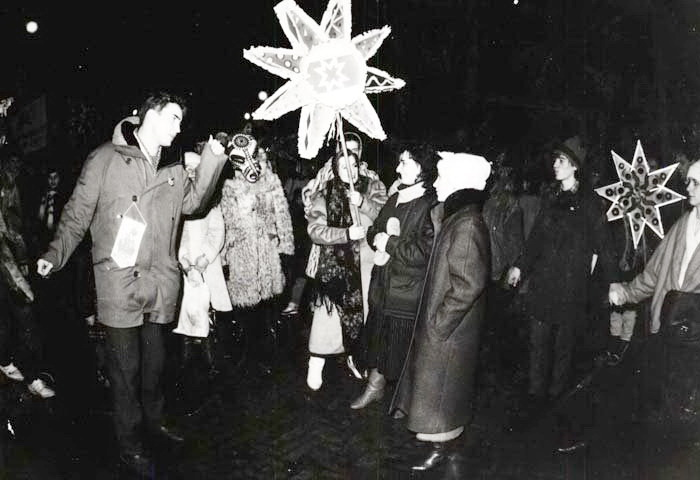
Kalyady, 1989

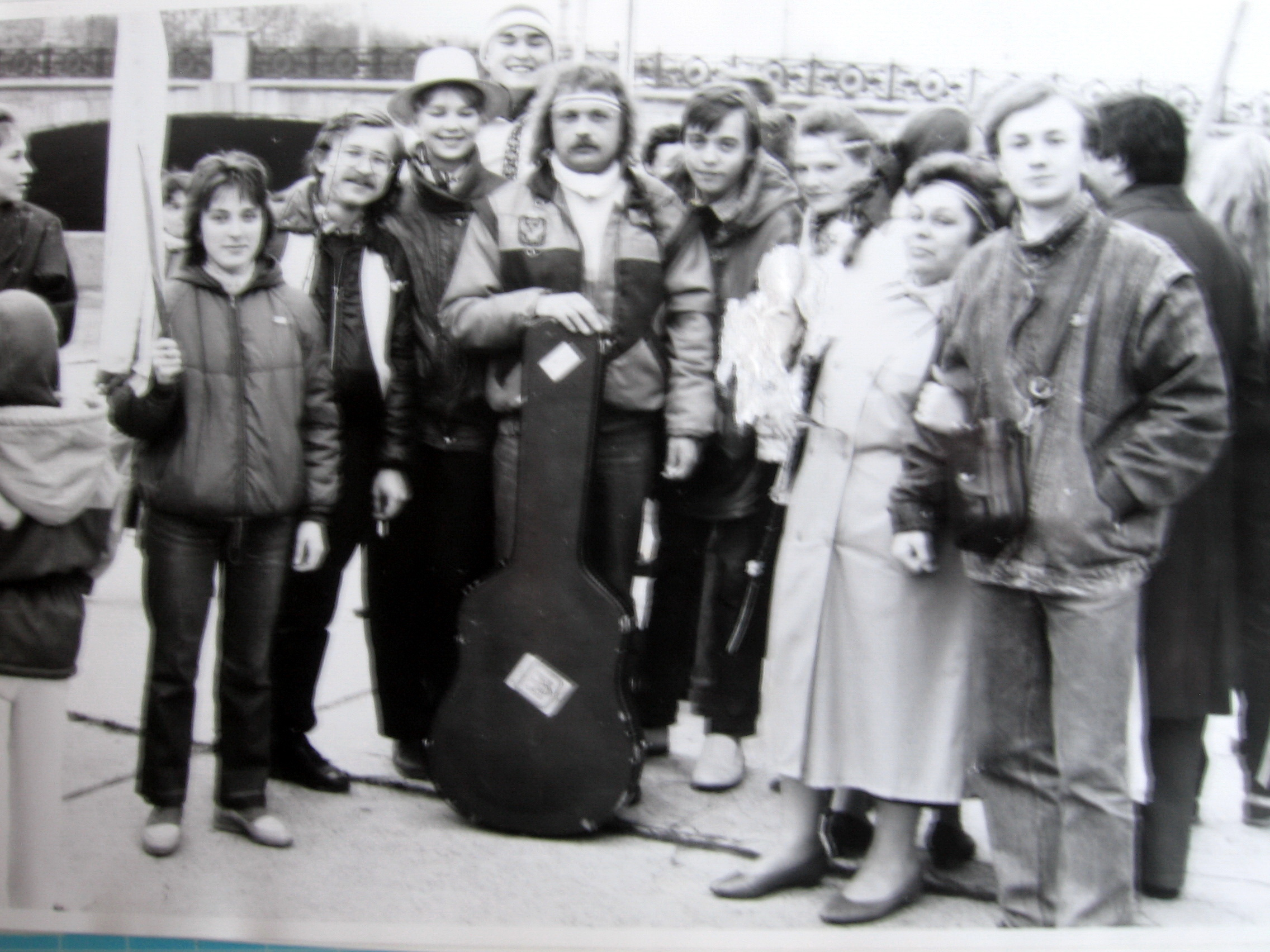
Talaka with Syarzhuk Sokalau-Voyush, 1990

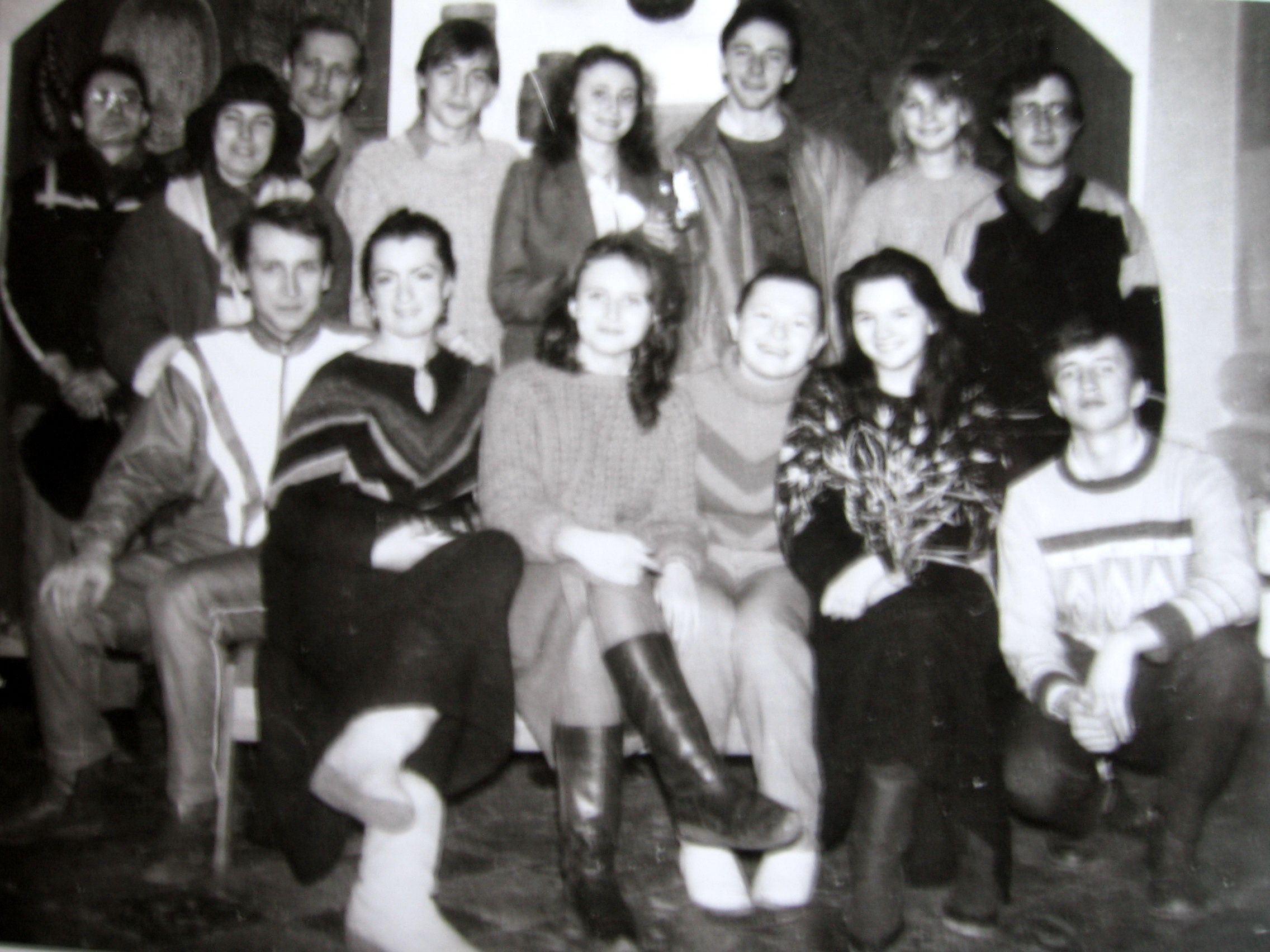
Zaslaŭje museum, 1989

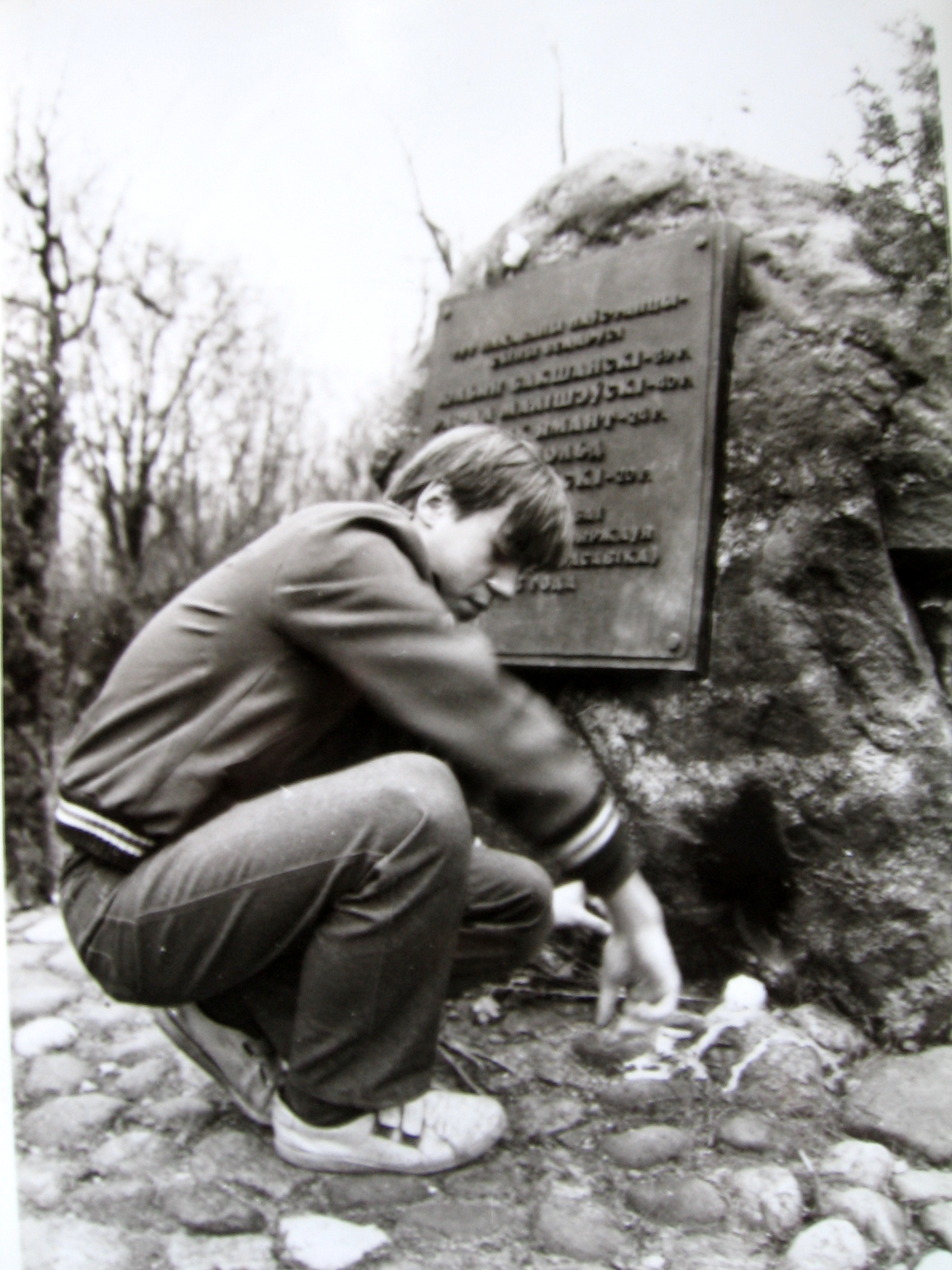
During Dziady, celebrating January Uprising, 1989

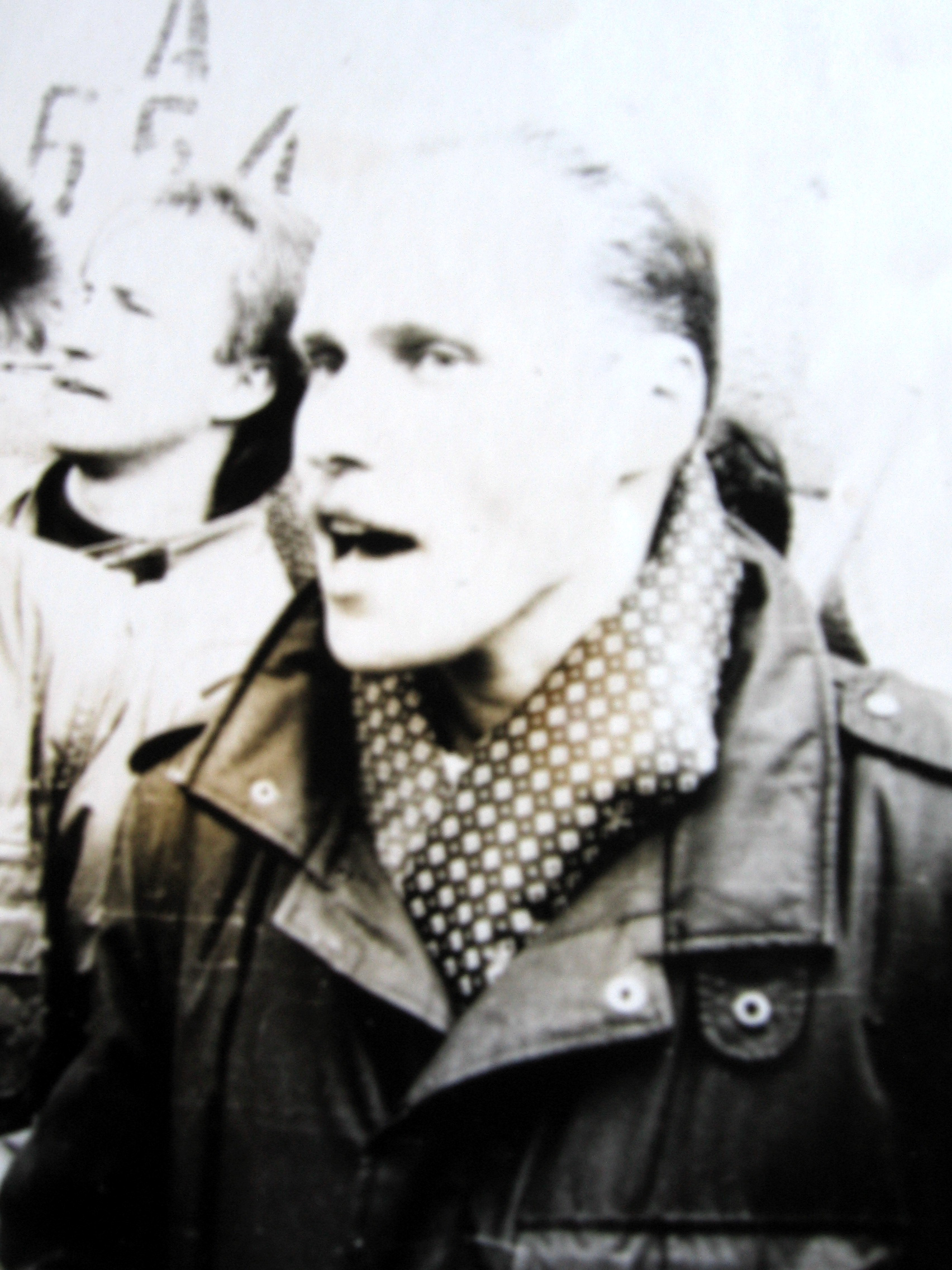
Leader Syarzhuk Vitushka, 1989
