= Siaržuk Vituška =

Belarusian writer and independence activist

- Сяржук Вітушка
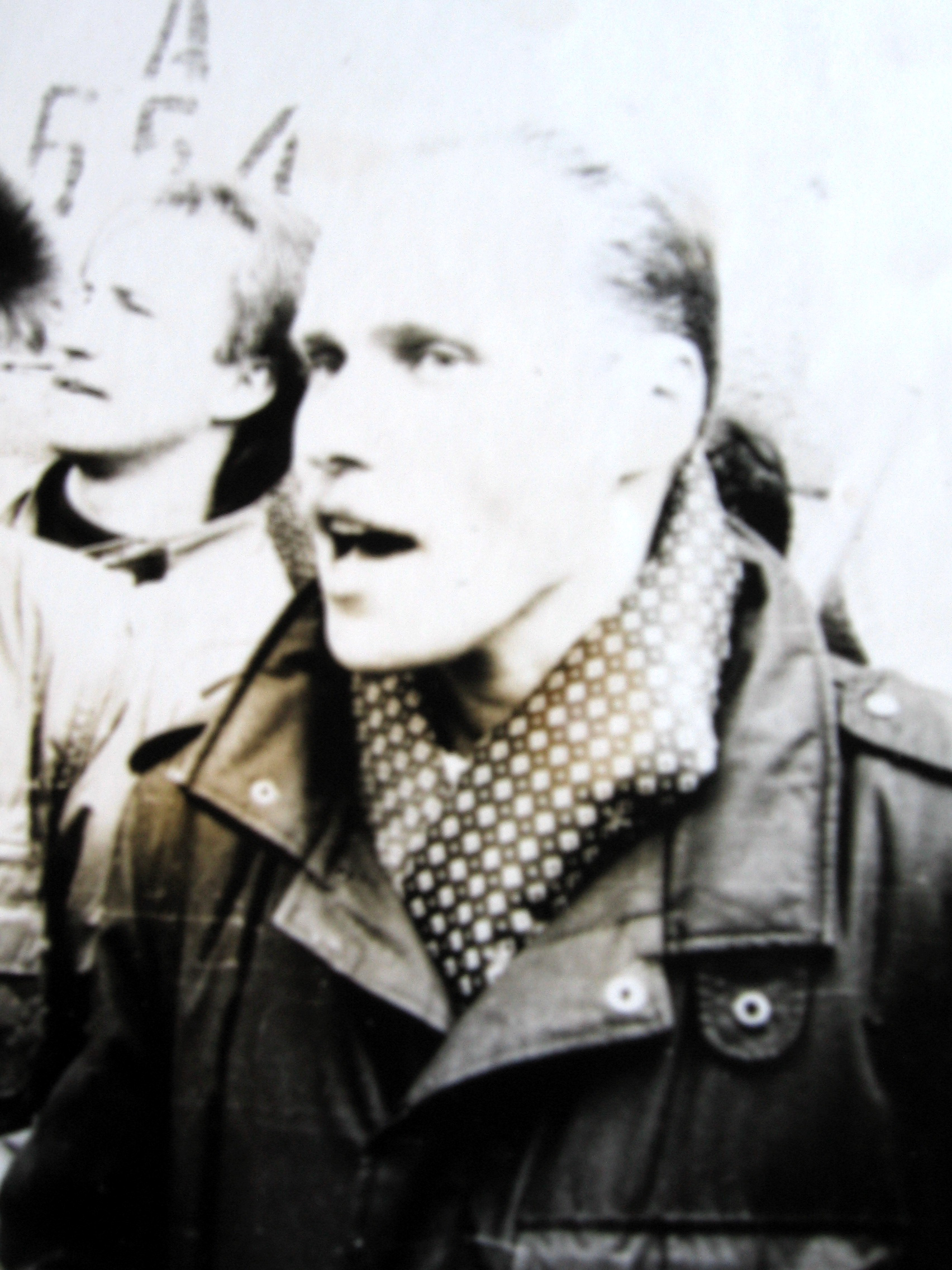
- Siaržuk Vituška in 1989
- Born: 10 April 1965; Chysts, Byelorussian SSR, Soviet Union
- Died: 2 July 2012 (aged 47); Vilnius, Lithuania
- Resting place: Rahava, Belarus
- Education: Belarusian State University
- Occupation: historian
- Organization: Talaka

Siaržuk Vituška (Belarusian: Сяржу́к Віту́шка; 10 April 1965 – 2 July 2012) was a prominent figure of the Belarusian independence movement in the late Soviet period, historian, columnist and writer.

== Early life ==
Vituška was born in Chysts near Maladzyechna in the northwest of the Byelorussian SSR.

In 1989, he graduated from the Belarusian State University with a degree in history.

== Belarusian Revival initiatives ==
In 1986 Vituška joined Talaka (Belarusian: Талака) and in 1987 was elected its chairman. Talaka was a cultural and educational youth organisation in Belarus in the late Soviet period. It was a predecessor and early part of the Perestroyka-inspired pro-independence movement in Soviet Belarus. Several key members of the Talaka later formed the Belarusian Popular Front, an anti-Soviet national movement.

Vituška was an author and member of the editorial board of Unija (Belarusian: Унія), a magazine researching Belarusian religious life and promoting the cause of the Uniate Church revival.

== Later life in Vilnius ==
From 1991 Vituška works at a Belarusian school in Vilnius. He was a founder and the first director of the Belarusian museum in that city. He published a newspaper «Vilnia i kraj» (“Vilnius and Country”), participated in radio and TV programs and wrote articles for Belarusian newspapers Naša Niva («Наша Ніва») and Ruń («Рунь»).

In 2011 he published his children book “Ding Dong: Let’s Do Stories” («Дзінь-дзілінь: пара гуляць у казкі!»).

== Death ==
Vituška suffered from poor health in his late life and died on 2 July 2012 году in Vilnius. He is buried in the village of Rahava near Minsk.
