= Chysts =

Chysts Чысць (Belarusian) Чисть (Russian) Chist
- Settlement
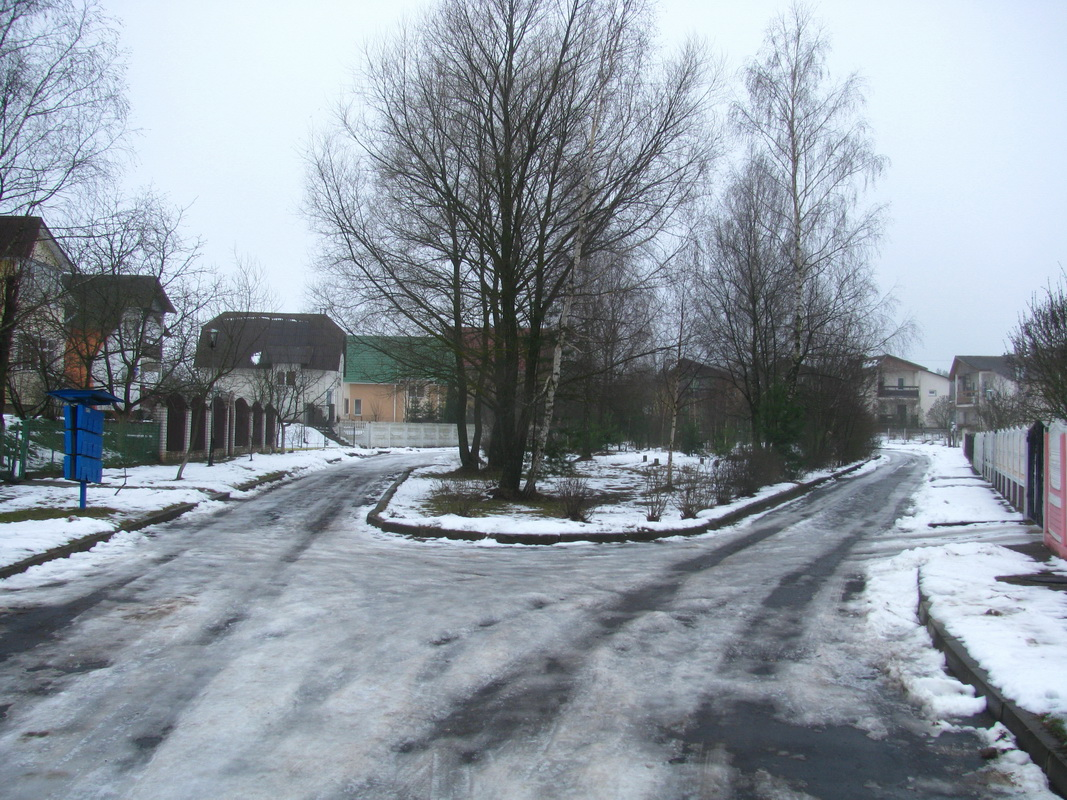

- Location within Belarus
- Coordinates: 54°16′06″N 27°06′32″E
- Country: Belarus
- Region: Minsk Region
- District: Maladzyechna District
- Founded: 1955

Population (2010)
  - Total: 5,422
- Time zone: UTC+3 (MSK)

Chysts or Chist (Belarusian: Чысць, romanized: Čysć; Russian: Чисть) is a settlement in Maladzyechna District, Minsk Region, Belarus. It serves as the administrative center of Chysts selsoviet. The population is 5,422 (2010 estimate).

== History ==
Chysts was founded in 1955 as a work settlement attached to the local peat mining factory, which was active until 1980s, before the peat run out. Since late 1980s the town is primarily known as a location of Zabudova, one of the biggest building material manufacturings in Belarus.

== Notable people ==
- Siaržuk Vituška (1965–2012), prominent figure of the Belarusian independence movement in the late Soviet period, historian, columnist and writer.
