= Ivan Luckievič =

Belarusian independence leader (1881–1919)

- Іван Луцкевіч
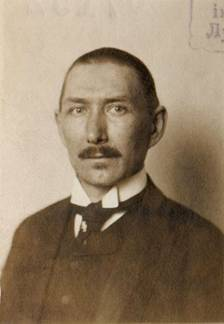
- Ivan Luckievič
- Born: June 9, 1881; Šiauliai, Kovno Governorate, Russian Empire
- Disappeared: Zakopane, Poland
- Died: August 20, 1919 (aged 38)
- Resting place: Rasos cemetery, Vilnius
- Occupations: publicist, archaeologist
- Known for: participation in the Belarusian independence movement in the early 20th century

Ivan Ivanavič Luckievič (Belarusian: Іва́н Іва́навіч Луцке́віч; Lithuanian: Ivanas Luckevičius; Russian: Ива́н Ива́нович Луцке́вич; 9 June 1881 – 20 August 1919) was a leading figure of the Belarusian independence movement in the early 20th century, publicist and archaeologist. He was a brother of Anton Luckievič.

== Early life ==
Luckievič was born in Šiauliai, in the Kovno Governorate of the Russian Empire (now in Lithuania) into the family of a petty nobleman who at the time worked as a railway official.

In 1890 he began his studies at the Liepāja Gymnasium followed by the Minsk Gymnasium from 1897 to 1902. This was followed by studies at the Faculty of Law of St. Petersburg University and the Moscow Archaeological Institute.

== Involvement in revolutionary activities ==
In 1903 Luckievič became one of the founders of the Belarusian Revolutionary Assembly (later the Belarusian Socialist Assembly). He was briefly imprisoned for his political activities and in 1904 moved to the Austro-Hungarian Empire to continue studies at the University of Vienna.

In 1905 Luckievič returned to Minsk to take an active part in the events of the Russian Revolution of 1905. Under threat of arrest, he left for Vilnius in early 1906.

== Leading figure of the Belarusian independence movement ==
At that time Vilnius was becoming "the most important centre for Belarusian intellectual activism" and Luckievič took an active part in the Belarusian cultural revival and independence movement.

He was instrumental in the setting up of the publishing house "Nasha Khata" ("Our House") and the Belarusian Publishing Society and the publication of the first Belarusian newspapers "Nasha Dolya" ("Our Destiny"), "Nasha Niva" ("Our Cornfield") and "Homan" (the "Babble").

He also initiated a Belarusian club where amateur drama was performed and the Belarusian Gymnasium of Vilnia, where he taught local lore and Belarusian studies.

== Illness and death ==
In the late 1910s, Luckievič contracted tuberculosis. In 1919 he went to a Polish resort in Zakopane where he succumbed to the disease on 20 August.

In 1991 his ashes were brought from Poland and reburied in the Rasos cemetery in Vilnius.

== Memory ==
After Ivan Lucievič's death, his collections of archeology, ethnography and old books were organised in 1921 into the Vilnius Belarusian Museum, which took his name.
