= Vilnius Belarusian Museum =

Coordinates: 54.6845°N 25.2798°E

Ivan Lutskievič Belarusian Museum in Vilnius
- Lithuanian: I. Luckevičiaus baltarusių muziejus Belarusian: Віленскі беларускі музэй імя Івана Луцкевіча
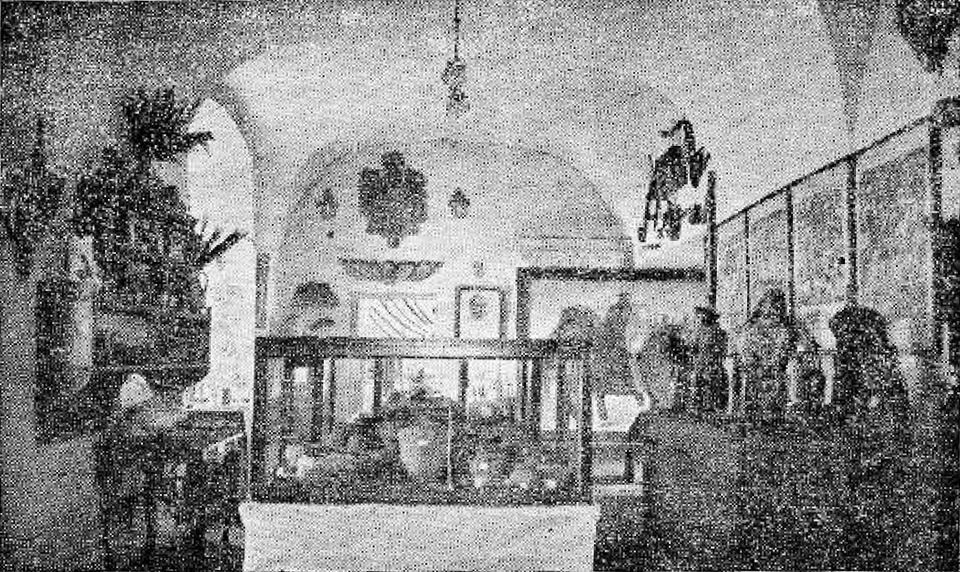
- One of the exhibition rooms of the Belarusian Museum (1933)
- Established: 1921 reestablished in 2001
- Location: Vilniaus g. 20, Vilnius, Lithuania
- Type: Ethnographic-historical
- Director: Liudvika Kardis

Ivan Lutskievič Belarusian Museum in Vilnius (Belarusian: Беларускі музэй у Вільне, romanized: Biełaruski muzej u Vilnie; Lithuanian: I. Luckevičiaus baltarusių muziejus; Polish: Muzeum Białoruskie w Wilnie) is a Belarusian scientific and educational organisation, which originally existed from 1921 to 1945 in Vilnius (Wilno, Vilna). It was located in the Monastery of the Holy Trinity in close proximity to the Belarusian Scientific Society and Vilnius Belarusian Gymnasium. The museum was reestablished in 2001.

The museum was founded based on the collection of Ivan Luckievič. The collection was divided into sections of ethnography (clothes, textile, music instruments), archeology, numismatics and library (mostly, of incunabulas and manuscripts).

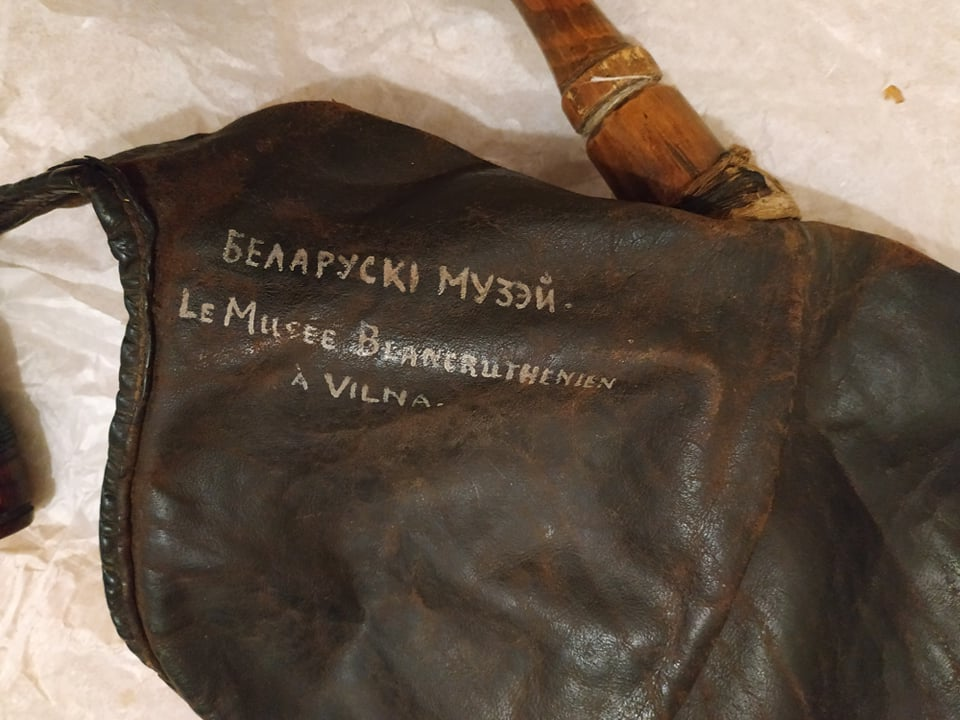
A volynka of Ignat Buinitski donated to the museum

== History ==
=== Interwar (1921–1939) ===
Ivan Luckievič started collecting Belarusian antiques during his school years. In 1908, he placed his collection at the editorial offices of Naša Niva. At that time, the collection already contained Skaryna's Bible, a Statute of Lithuania, several Slutsk belts, issues of Mużyckaja prauda.

In 1921, two years after Luckievič's death, his collection was transformed by the Belarusian Scientific Society to a public museum (full official name: Vilnius Belarusian Historic-Ethnographic Museum Named after Ivan Lutskievič). The museum was located in a small space of 4 or 5 chambers inside the Monastery of the Holy Trinity. The museum was managed by Ivan's younger brother, Anton Luckievič, and engineer Liavon Dubeikauski.

The museum's primary goal was the collection of materials to foster the study of the material and intangible culture of Belarusians, with a particular emphasis on their folk history during the period of the Grand Duchy of Lithuania.

First known inventory of the museum was made in 1922, categorizing items into sections such as folklore (106 items), hand drawings (797 drawings), armour (126 items), tiles, bricks etc. (435 items). A subsequent inventory from 1933 shows that the museum expanded to include a prehistoric section of 200 items from Palaeolithic, Neolithic, Bronze and Iron Ages, a sigillographic collection of 103 stamps, collections of rings, religious objects (old crosses, icons, clothes), painting and drawings, wooden sculpture. The ethnographic section contained textiles, clothes, musical instruments, clay and glass vessels.

In 1937, the full collection of museum included 4228 items, of which 1511 were exhibited and 2711 were stored. The items were divided into sections: ethnography (86 exhibits), visual arts (161 exhibits), sculpture (65 exhibits), crafts (154 exhibits), numismatics (2492 exhibits), archeology (184 exhibits). Museum's library had 10555 volumes.

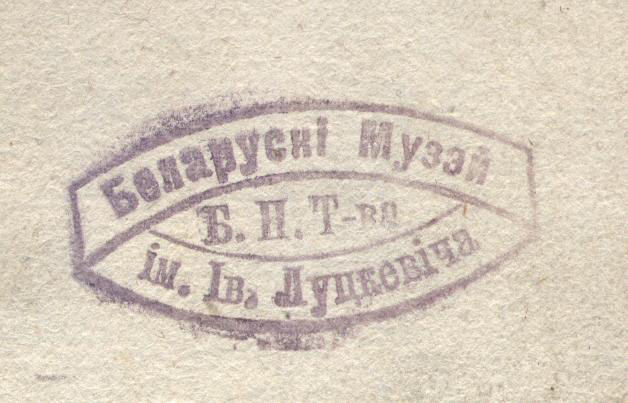
Museum's ex libris

=== World War II ===
After the capture of Vilnius by Soviet forces in September 1939, members of the museum's committee were arrested (Anton Luckievič, Uladzimir Samoila, Anton Nekanda-Trepka). Although formally museum was not shut down, it did not function from October 1939 to 15 July 1940. The museum was made a subsidiary of the newly established Academy of Sciences of the Lithuanian SSR.

In October 1940, the museum reopened. The position of director was first offered to the ethnographer Maryian Petsiukevich. Ianka Shutovich was the director of the museum from February 1941 to November 1944.

=== Liquidation ===
After return of Soviet regime, the collections were split among several other museums. Museum's director Shutovich was arrested and sent to Gulag camps.

Juozas Pertulis took over as the director. A liquidation committee was formed which included deputy Commissar of People's Education Michalina Meškauskienė and representative of the Central Committee of the Communist Party of Lithuania historian Albinas Daukša-Paškevičius. The committee finished its work in June 1945, distributing museum's collections between other institutions of Lithuania and Belarus: items with text in the Belarusian language were transferred to Belarus while items connected with the history of the Grand Duchy of Lithuania were given to Lithuanian museums. Some of the items were given to central museums in Moscow.

== Revival in 2000s ==
In 2001, Siaržuk Vituška launched an initiative to restore the museum. The initiative group, including Halina Voitsik, Siaržuk and Liudevika Vituška, Siarhei Dubaviets, Tatiana Poklad, registered NGO Ivan Lutskievitch Belarusian Museum in Lithuania. This NGO seeks to conduct historical research, present historical knowledge to the public, and claims to continue the traditions of the interwar museum.

In 2021, this organisation was granted a house at Vilniaus Street 20 by Vilnius City Municipality. The director of the new Belarusian Museum is Liudvika Kardzis (Vituška). On 4 August 2021, the first exhibition was opened in the new building. It presented works of Belarusian feminine artists Zoia Koush, Zhana Gladko, Sviatlana Petushkova, Aliesia Zhytkuevitch. The second exhibition (5 December 2012) celebrated 115 years of Nasha Niva, the newspaper founded by Ivan Luckievič, and 100 years of the museum.

During its first year, the revived museum organised exhibitions of paintings, photographs and book graphics, presentations of books by Uladzimir Nyaklyayew, Volha Hapeyeva, Jury Dzikavitski, concerts of Zmitar Bartosik, Zmitar Vajciukievich, Andrej Hadanovich, poetry festivals, workshops, theatre plays. It also opened a public library and circles for kids. The museum published guides Vilnius Folklore and Stories of Vilnius Printing Houses (in Belarusian and Lithuanian languages).

== Commemoration ==
From 15 October to 12 December 2021, the Belarusian National Arts Museum hosted an exhibition dedicated to the 100th anniversary of the museum. The exhibition presented the artefacts which once belonged to the museum and were later moved to Belarus.
