= Anton Luckievich =

Belarusian politician

Anton Luckievič
- Антон Луцкевіч
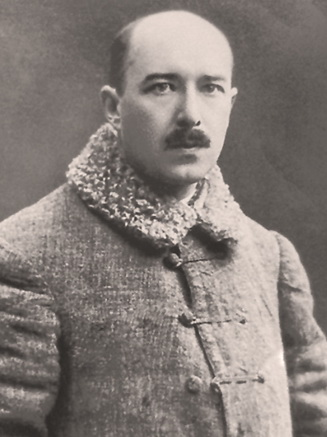

Chairmen of the Council of Ministers of the Belarusian Democratic Republic
- In office 11 October 1918 – 13 December 1919
- Preceded by: Himself as Chairman of the People's Secretariat
- Succeeded by: Vaclau Lastouski

Chairmen of the People's Secretariat of the Belarusian Democratic Republic
- In office October 1918 – 11 October 1918
- Preceded by: Raman Skirmunt and Jan Sierada
- Succeeded by: Himself as Chairman of the Council of Ministers

Personal details
- Born: 29 January 1884 Šiauliai, Kovno Governorate, Russian Empire (now Lithuania)
- Died: 23 March 1942 (aged 58) Atkarsk, Saratov Oblast, RSFSR, Soviet Union (now Russia)
- Occupation: politician, journalist, linguist

Anton Ivanavič Luckievič (Belarusian: Анто́н Іва́навіч Луцке́віч, Lithuanian: Antonas Luckevičius, Russian: Анто́н Ива́нович Луцке́вич, Polish: Antoni Łuckiewicz; 29 January 1884 – 23 March 1942) was a leading figure of the Belarusian independence movement in the early 20th century, an initiator of the proclamation of the independence of Belarus, the Prime Minister and the Minister of Foreign Affairs of the Belarusian Democratic Republic persecuted by the Soviet authorities. He was a brother of Ivan Luckievič.

== Early life ==
Luckievič was born in Šiauliai, Kovno Governorate, Russian Empire into the family of a petty nobleman of Nowina Coat of Arm who at the time worked as a railway official.

In 1902 he graduated from the Minsk Gymnasium. This was followed by studies at the Faculty of Mathematics and Physics of St. Petersburg University and the Faculty of Law of the Universität Dorpat.

== Involvement in revolutionary activities ==
In 1903 Luckievič, together with his brother Ivan and another prominent figure of the Belarusian national movement, Vacłaŭ Ivanoŭski, founded the Belarusian Revolutionary Assembly (later the Belarusian Socialist Assembly) with the goal to fight for democracy and national rights for Belarusians, including the right to pursue education in the Belarusian language, as well as to rise up against the Russian Tsarist authorities. In 1904, Luckievič was arrested in Minsk for distribution of revolutionary literature, but was eventually released with his right to leave the city restricted. Nevertheless, he left for Vilnius in 1906 because there was an assassination attempt against the Governor of Minsk, Pavel Kourlov, committed by Ivan Pulichaŭ and Aleksandra Izmailovich, who had frequented Luckievič's apartment, which automatically put him under threat of arrest.

In Vilnius, the Luckievič brothers were instrumental in the setting up of the publishing house "Naša Chata" ("Our House") and the Belarusian Publishing Society in 1906 as well as the publication of the first Belarusian newspapers "Naša Dolia" ("Our Destiny"), "Naša Niva" ("Our Cornfield") and "Homan" (the "Babble").

Luckievič was also one of the founders of the Freemasonry Lodge “Jedność” (“Unity”) established in Vilnius in 1910 as well as an active member of the Lodges “Lithuania” and “Belarus” representing Belarusian national interests there. He was involved in publishing activities of the lodges as he authored the vast majority of articles for the Russian-language newspaper “Вечерняя газета” (“Evening Newspaper”) and published the Polish-language newspaper “Kurjer Krajowy” (“The National Courier”).

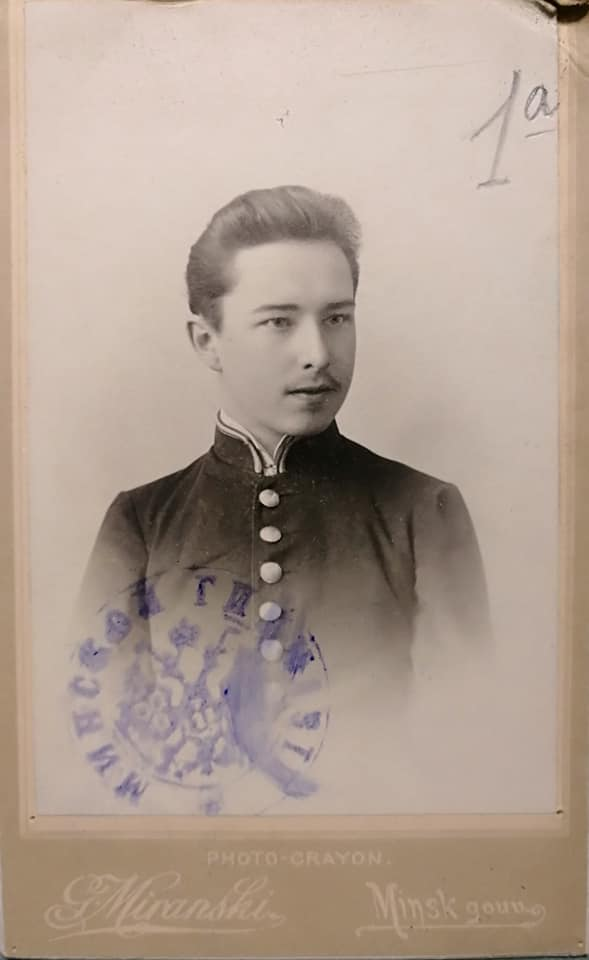
Anton Łuckievič after his graduation (1902)

== World War I ==
After the occupation of Vilnius by the German troops in 1915 Luckievič became the vice-president of the Belarusian Society of Help for Victims of War. The German authorities had forbidden any political activity and this Society actually covered the clandestine Belarusian People's Committee that was also headed by Luckievič. The same year, together with his brother Ivan as well as Alaiza Paškievič (Ciotka), Luckievič participated in the creation of the Belarusian Social Democratic Workers’ Group uniting representatives of Vilnius' factories that was an autonomous unit of the Belarusian Socialist Assembly.

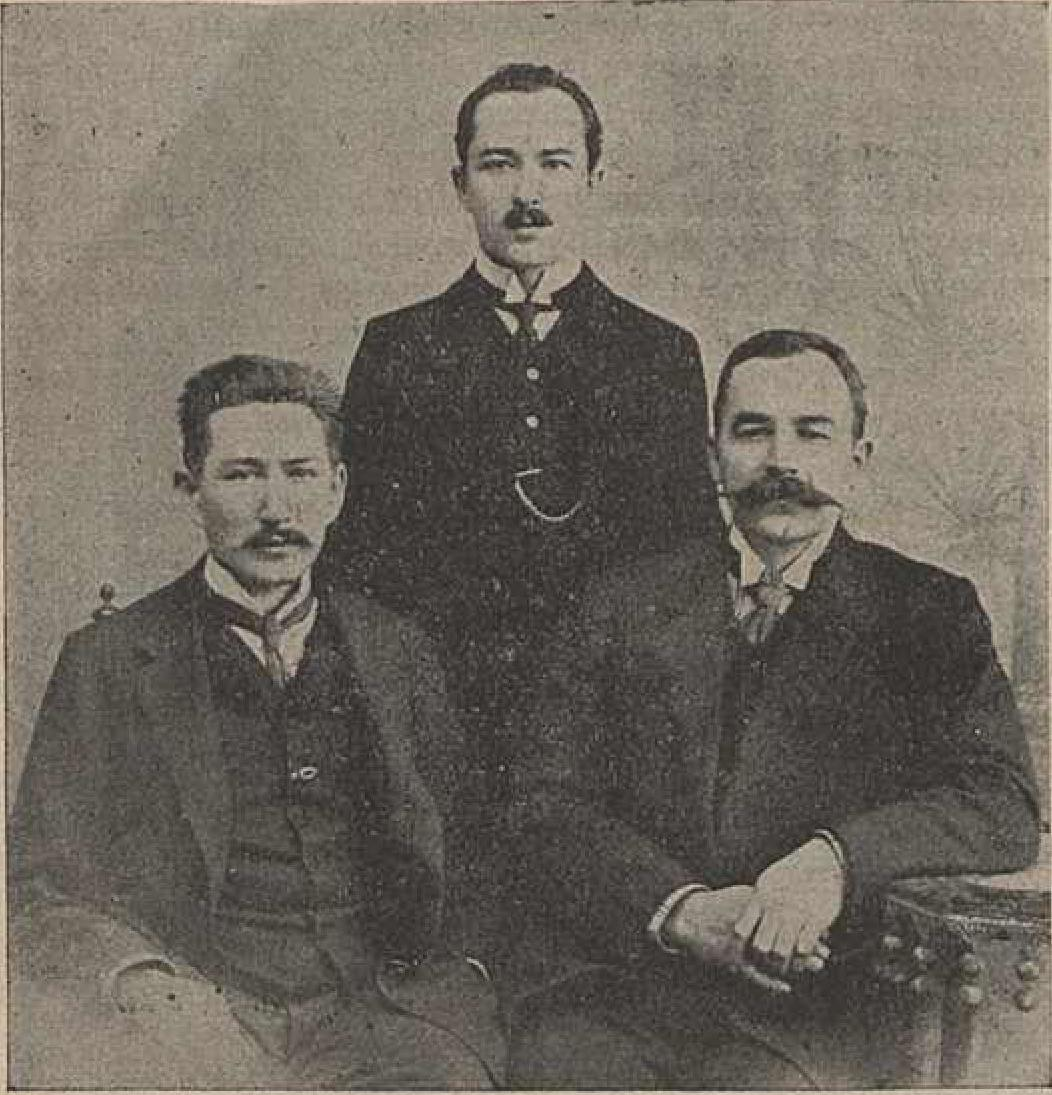
The Luckievič brothers and Aliaksandar Ulasaŭ at the time of publishing Naša Niva

He was one of the initiators of the Confederation of the Grand Duchy of Lithuania and Belarus, a union of Belarusian, Lithuanian, Polish and Jewish organisations that aimed at the re-creation of a Belarusian-Lithuanian-Latvian state on the territory of the former Great Duchy of Lithuania.

Luckievič also formulated the ground principles of the United States from the Baltic Sea until the Black Sea that constituted the political ideal accepted by all the Belarusian political parties and movements of that time and approved by the Belarusian People's Committee in 1916.

== At the time of the Belarusian Democratic Republic ==
In 1918, Luckievič was elected President of the Belarusian Council of Vilnius. Together with his brother Ivan, he headed a delegation of the Belarusian Council of Vilnius to the Rada of the Belarusian Democratic Republic that, on 25 March 1918, accepted the Third Constitutional Convention (or the Third Constitutional Hramata, Third Constituent Charter) and proclaimed the independence of the Belarusian Democratic Republic.

In September – November 1918, Luckievič headed a Belarusian delegation to Ukraine and met there with Hetman Pavlo Skoropadskyi. He also secretly met with Christian Rakovsky, a Bolshevik politician. As a result of these meetings Luckievič ascertained that Soviet Russia would not recognise the Belarusian Democratic Republic.

On 12 October 1918, he was appointed prime minister, and later that year, Minister of Foreign Affairs. Luckievič made every effort in order for representatives of the Belarusian Democratic Republic to participate in the Paris Peace Conference (1919–1920). On 22 January 1919, he signed a memorandum of the Belarusian Government to the Chairperson of the Paris Peace Conference in which he justified the right of the Belarusian people for statehood by referring to the history of the Belarusian independence movement and demanded to admit representatives of the Belarusian Democratic Republic to the conference. The Belarusian delegation arrived to Paris five months after the beginning of the conference, when the positions of the neighbouring countries (Lithuania and Poland) had been already heard. The reason for such a late arrival to the conference was the initial lack of finances and the necessity to wait for a loan from Ukraine.

Luckievič stayed in Paris for three months. In July 1919, he established contacts with Ignacy Paderewski, Prime Minister of Poland and Head of the Polish delegation, and handed over a draft agreement “On the Creation of the Union of Two Sovereign States – the Belarusian Democratic Republic and the Polish Republic” to him. This agreement specified provisions for close cooperation between the two countries and also had a secret attachment on military cooperation and mutual actions on establishing borders with the neighbouring countries. Ignacy Paderewski invited Luckievič to Warsaw. On 1 September 1919, the latter arrived there but neither could meet with the Prime Minister, who had earlier left for Paris, nor return to Paris because the Ministry of Foreign Affairs, unlike many other countries, did not recognize the passport of the Belarusian Democratic Republic and refused to issue a diplomatic visa to Luckievič. Instead, he could meet with Józef Piłsudski, but the negotiations did not result in any support for the Belarusian Democratic Republic.

On 1 December 1919, Luckievič returned to Minsk. After a rift in the Rada of the Belarusian Democratic Republic, he became President of the Council of Ministers of the Supreme Rada of the Belarusian Democratic Republic. However, having failed to come to an agreement with Poland, Luckievič resigned on 28 February 1920 and left for Vilnius.

== In Western Belarus ==
In Vilnius, Luckievič resumed publishing the newspaper "Naša Niva" and published the books "Naša Niva" and “Памяці Івана Луцкевіча” (“In Memory of Ivan Luckievič”). In July 1920 he was briefly imprisoned by the Bolsheviks authorities.

In 1921, Luckievič became President of the Belarusian National Committee in Vilnius. He also taught in the Belarusian Gymnasium of Vilnius and, in 1921, founded the Belarusian Scholar Council, which would later merge with the Society of the Belarusian Schools. He was also instrumental in establishing the Ivan Luckievič Belarusian Museum.

In 1922 he headed the Belarusian Central Electoral Committee in Vilnius and formulated the tactics and structure of the Belarusian Deputy Club, a Belarusian fraction in the Polish Sejm. Luckievič wrote extensively for several newspapers and edited the journals of the Belarusian Deputy Club, including “Syn Bielarusa” (“The Son of a Belarusian”), “Sialianskaja Praŭda” (“The Truth of a Farmworker”), “Holas Bielarusa” (“The Voice of a Belarusian”), “Bielaruskaja Dolia” (“Belarusian Destiny”), “Bielaruskaja Niva” (“Belarusian Cornfield”), “Iskra” (“Spark”). After the creation of the Belarusian Peasants' and Workers' Union in 1925, he worked in its editing committee on the invitation of Symon Rak-Michajłoŭski.

On 12 October 1927, Luckievič was arrested by the Polish authorities and charged with cooperation with German and Soviet intelligence services. He was acquitted of all the charges by the court at the beginning of 1928. Later that year, he was re-arrested and acquitted again. In 1929, Luckievič was expelled from the Society of the Belarusian Schools because his views were not supported by the communists, who had a strong position in the Society.

In 1930, the Polish authorities forbade the activities of the Belarusian Publishing Society headed by Luckievič. In 1931, he was fired from the Belarusian Gymnasium of Vilnius. Luckievič became a target of political speculations and attacks. Between 1933 and 1939, Belarusian newspapers and journals refused to publish his works. Luckievič ceased his political activities and worked in the Belarusian Scientific Society and the Ivan Luckievič Belarusian Museum. In Soviet Belarus his books had to be burned according to the Order No 33 of the Head Department of literature and publishing houses of 3 June 1937 on “The List of literature that has to be confiscated from public libraries, education institutions and bookstores”.

== Arrest by Soviet authorities and death ==
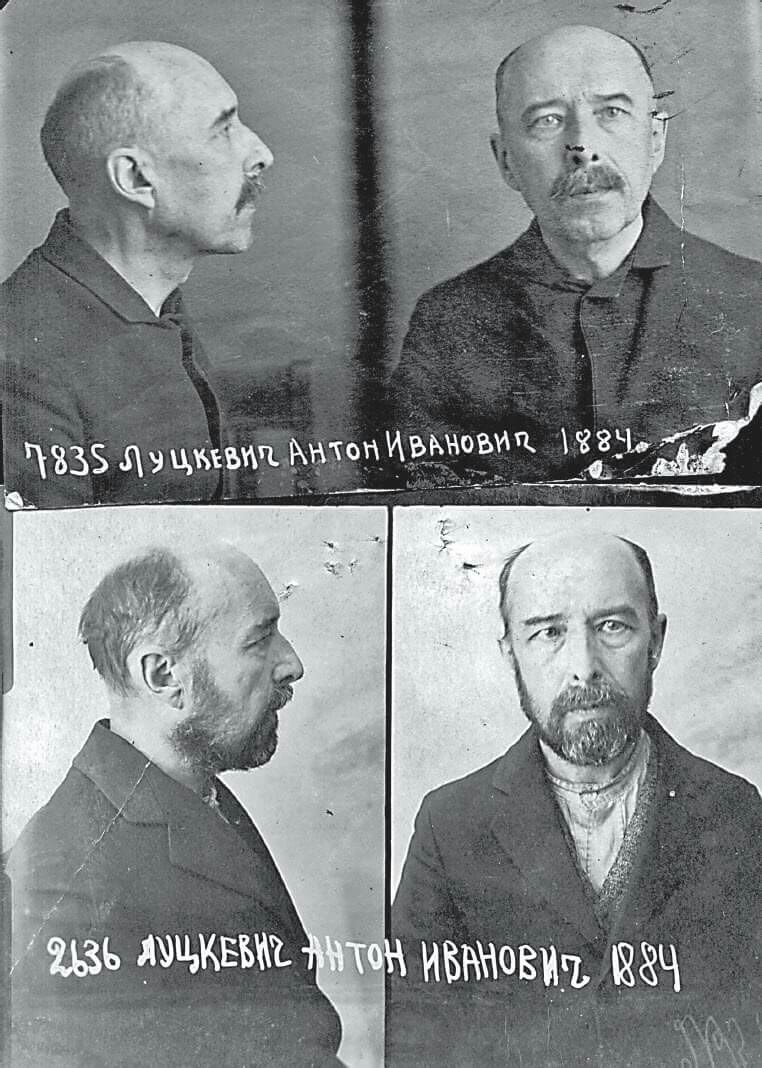
Photo of Anton Luckievič from the criminal case.

After the Soviet annexation of Western Belarus, Luckievič participated in the Conference of the Belarusian intellectual elite and urged to revive the Belarusian school, culture and arts. He supported the unification of Soviet Belarus and Western Belarus. On 30 September 1939, Luckievič was arrested by the Soviet authorities in Vilnius and, later, transferred to Minsk. On 8 August 1940, he was charged with cooperation with the Polish intelligence service, the creation of counter-revolutionary organisations within the Belarusian nationalist circles and the establishment of the government of a bourgeois Belarus headed by the national fascist Luckievič. On 14 June 1941, he was sentenced for anti-Soviet activities to eight years of Gulag prison camps. Luckievič died on 23 March 1942 during his transfer to the prison camp. He was buried in the special sector of the communal cemetery of Atkarsk in Russia. Luckievič was posthumously exonerated in 1989.

== Notable works ==
=== Works published during Luckievič’s lifetime ===
- Белорусы [Belarusians], St. Petersburg, 1909;
- Jak prawilna pisać pa biełarusku [How to Write Correctly in Belarusian], Viĺnia, 1917;
- Нашы песняры: літаратурна-сацыяльныя нарысы [Our National Bards: Literary-Social Sketches], Viĺnia, 1918;
- Ekanamičnaja ewalucyja i biełaruski ruch [Economic Evolution and Belarusian Movement], Viĺnia, 1918;
- Польская акупацыя Беларусі [Polish Occupation of Belarus], Viĺnia, 1920;
- Пуцяводныя ідэі беларускае літаратуры [The Guiding Ideas of the Belarusian Literature], Viĺnia, 1921;
- Вільня ў беларускай літаратуры [Viĺnia in the Belarusian Literature], Viĺnia, 1925;
- За дваццаць пяць гадоў (1903—1928): Успаміны аб працы першых беларускіх паліт. Арганізацый [In twenty-five years (1903-1928): Memoirs about the Activities of First Belarusian Political Organisations], Viĺnia, 1928 (republished: Minsk, 1991);
- Адбітае жыццё [Broken Life], Viĺnia, 1929;
- Białorusini i ich organ «Homan» [Belarusians and their Organ “Homan” (the “Babble”)] Lwów, 1935;

=== Posthumous publications ===
- Злучаныя Штаты ад Балтыкі да Чорнага мора [The United States from the Baltic Sea until the Black Sea]// Свабода [Svaboda]. 1990. No. 2;
- Дзённік [Diary]// Полымя [Polymia]. 1990. No. 4—5;
- Выбраныя творы: праблемы культуры, літаратуры і мастацтва [Selected Works: Problems of Culture, Literature and Arts ], Minsk, 2006.
- Беларуская граматыка [Belarusian Grammar Book], Viĺnia, 1916;

This book is the first Belarusian Grammar Book. It was written in 1916, before the Belarusian Grammar Book by Branislaŭ Taraškievič, 1918, but was discovered and published by the German Slavist Hermann Bieder only in 2017. The manuscript of the book is held in the Library of the Lithuanian Academy of Sciences.

== See also ==
- Lukash Dzekut-Malei
