= Zuyevka =

Zuyevka (Russian: Зуевка) is the name of several inhabited localities in Russia.

== Urban localities ==
- Zuyevka, Kirov Oblast, a town in Zuyevsky District of Kirov Oblast

== Rural localities ==
- Zuyevka, Republic of Bashkortostan, a village in Urgushevsky Selsoviet of Karaidelsky District of the Republic of Bashkortostan
- Zuyevka, Chelyabinsk Oblast, a village in Borovoy Selsoviet of Oktyabrsky District of Chelyabinsk Oblast
- Zuyevka, Kaliningrad Oblast, a settlement in Zalesovsky Rural Okrug of Polessky District of Kaliningrad Oblast
- Zuyevka, Kursk Oblast, a selo in Zuyevsky Selsoviet of Solntsevsky District of Kursk Oblast
- Zuyevka, Oryol Oblast, a village in Uzkinsky Selsoviet of Znamensky District of Oryol Oblast
- Zuyevka, Dedovichsky District, Pskov Oblast, a village in Dedovichsky District, Pskov Oblast
- Zuyevka, Sebezhsky District, Pskov Oblast, a village in Sebezhsky District, Pskov Oblast
- Zuyevka, Samara Oblast, a selo in Neftegorsky District of Samara Oblast
