= Zuyevsky =

Zuyevsky (masculine), Zuyevskaya (feminine), or Zuyevskoye (neuter) may refer to:

- Zuyevsky District, a district of Kirov Oblast, Russia
- Zuyevskoye Urban Settlement, a municipal formation which the Town of Zuyevka in Zuyevsky District of Kirov Oblast, Russia is incorporated as
- Zuyevsky (rural locality) (Zuyevskaya, Zuyevskoye), several rural localities in Russia
