= Ekaterina Kostina =

Belarusian-German mathematician

Ekaterina Arkad'evna Kostina (born October 18, 1964 in Minsk, Belarus) is a Belarusian-German mathematician specializing in numerical methods for nonlinear programming, robust optimization, and optimal control theory, and in the applications of these methods to the sciences. She is professor of numerical mathematics in the faculty of mathematics and computer science and institute for applied mathematics at Heidelberg University.

== Education ==
Kostina was a high school student in Minsk, and studied from 1981 to 1986 at Belarusian State University in Minsk, earning a master's degree in mathematics in 1986 with the master's thesis Solution algorithms and software for simple minmax problems. She completed her Ph.D. in 1990 through the Institute of Mathematics of the National Academy of Sciences of Belarus. Her dissertation, Algorithms for Solving Nonsmooth Minmax Problems, was supervised by Faina Mihajlovna Kirillova.

== Career ==
After completing her doctorate, Kostina continued as a researcher with the Institute of Mathematics until 1997, when she first came to the University of Heidelberg as a research scientist. After visiting the University of Siegen in 2005, she became a professor of mathematics at the University of Marburg in 2007, holding the chair for numerical optimization and becoming the first female mathematics professor there. In 2010 she added an affiliation with the Center for Synthetic Microbiology (Synmicro), a joint project of the University of Marburg and the Max Planck Society. She took her present position as a professor at Heidelberg University in 2015.

She has served since 2007 on the scientific board of the Ingrid zu Solms Foundation for the Promotion of Female Elites in Sciences and the Arts, which supports early-career women in the sciences and arts. In 2011 she became one of the founders of the National Committee for Mathematical Modeling, Simulation and Optimization (KoMSO).
