= Samuil Agurskii =

Belarusian Bundist and historian (1884–1947)

- Самуіл Агурскі שמואל אגורסקי
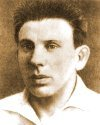
- Born: 29 April 1884; Grodno, Grodno Governorate, Russian Empire (now Belarus)
- Died: 19 May 1947 (aged 63); Pavlodar, Kazakh SSR, Soviet Union (now Kazakhstan)
- Occupation: Historian
- Political party: General Jewish Labour Bund

Samuil Khaimovich Agurskii (Belarusian: Самуіл Хаімавіч Агурскі, romanized: Samuil Khaimavich Ahurski; Yiddish: שמואל אגורסקי; Russian: Самуил Хаимович Агурский; 29 April 1884 – 19 May 1947) was a Belarusian Bundist and later Communist politician and historian.

== Early life and life in emigration ==
Samuil Khaimovich Agurskii was born in Grodno on 29 April 1884. He joined the General Jewish Labour Bund following the Russian Revolution of 1905, and subsequently lived in England and the United States between 1906 and 1917. In America, he was active in anarchism and the Yiddish press.

== Return to Belarus ==
He was Jewish commissar of Vitebsk between 1918 and 1919. He moved to Moscow, but visited the United States twice in the next four years, helping to found the Communist Party USA. In the mid- and late-1920s, he compiled historical documents on the history of the Jewish labor movement in the Communist Party of Byelorussia, into which the General Jewish Labour Bund had merged in the early 1920s. This, along with Agurskii's critical history of Konstanty Kalinowski and the January Uprising served as a criticism of the Belarusian Academy of Sciences and its policies which supported Belarusization. Agurskii's critiques were supported by First Secretary of the CPB Yan Gamarnik, who applauded Agurskii's efforts to combat nationalism. They later served as the basis for the removal of Usievalad Ihnatoŭski as head of the Belarusian Academy of Sciences and his persecution as part of the Case of the Union of Liberation of Belarus, who eventually died under disputed circumstances.

== Exile and death ==
In the late 1930s, amidst the Great Purge, the Communist Party of Byelorussia accused Agurskii of idealizing the Bund and subverting the Belarusian Academy of Sciences. Sentenced to exile in Kazakhstan, he died in the city of Pavlodar on 19 May 1947. He was posthumously rehabilitated on 7 April 1956.
