= Celestyn Burstin =

Austrian-Soviet mathematician

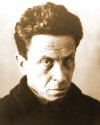
Celestyn Burstin

Celestyn Burstin (1888–1938) was an Austrian-Soviet mathematician. He was born in 1888 in Tarnopol (Austro-Hungary, currently Ukraine), graduated from the University of Vienna in 1911, and earned a doctorate degree in 1912. Being a Jew and a communist, he had difficulty to get an academic appointment in German-speaking lands, and moved to Minsk in 1929, where he was appointed as a professor of the Belarusian State University, and as the director of the Institute of Mathematics of the Belarusian National Academy of Sciences; shortly thereafter he was also elected as a member of the academy.

In 1925 he joined the Austrian communist party, and after emigration to Russia, the Soviet communist party. In 1931, after a coup d'état in the Moscow Mathematical Society, led by the communist zealots preaching the “class character of science,” he became a member of the Society's ruling board.

He was arrested in 1937 and died in prison in Minsk in 1938. He was rehabilitated in 1956.

Burstin's mathematical work included contributions to differential geometry, measure theory, and general algebraic systems.
