= Military Cemetery (Minsk) =

Cemetery in Minsk, Belarus

Coordinates: 53°54′31″N 27°35′11″E

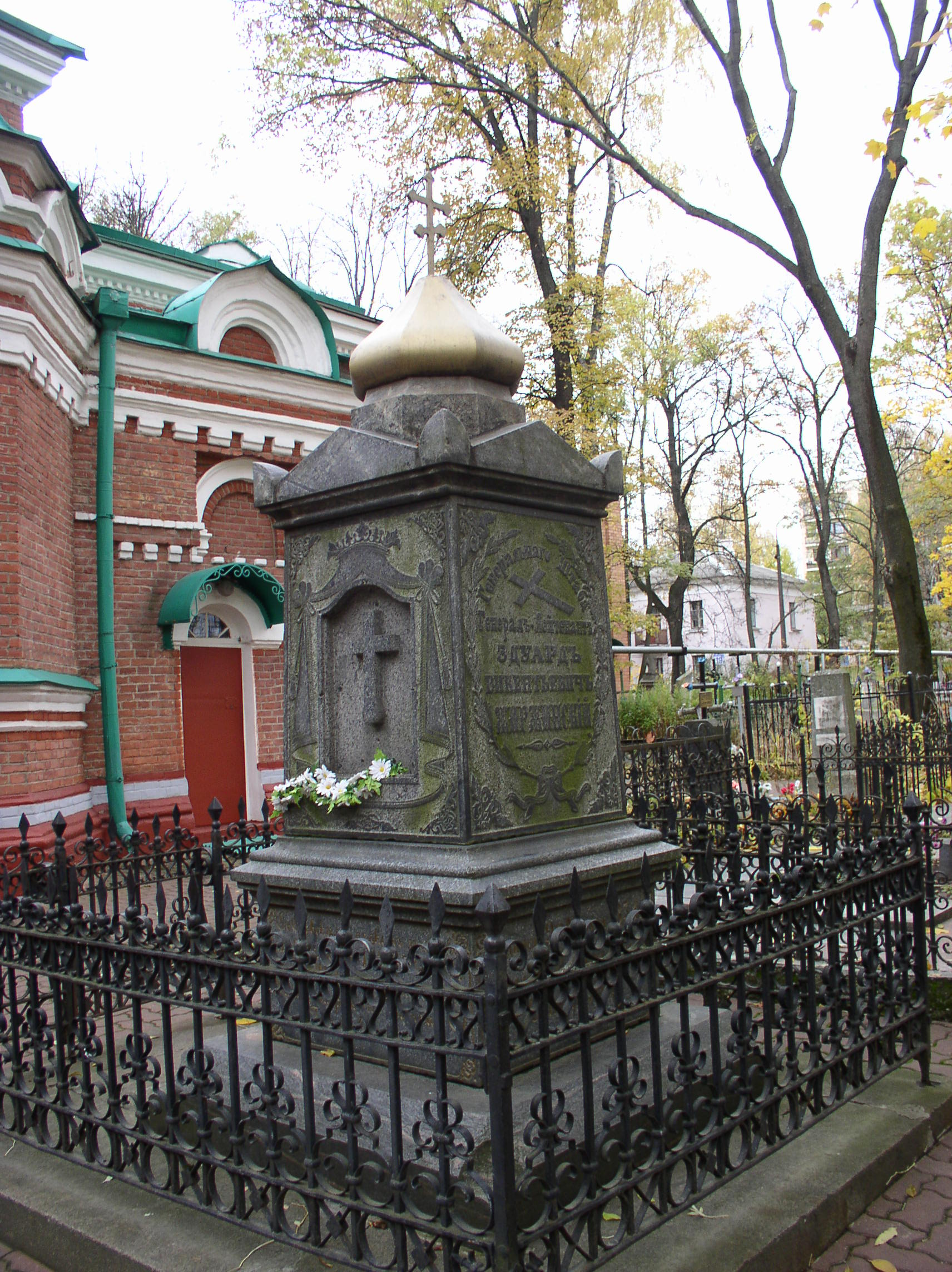
The grave of Edward Żyrzyński

Military Cemetery is a cemetery in Minsk, Belarus.

== History ==
The Military Cemetery was opened and consecrated in 1895 when a nearby older cemetery for military personnel was closed for further interments. In 1898, an Orthodox church was built in the cemetery – conceived as a monument to the soldiers who gave their lives in the Russo-Turkish war of 1877–1878. Inside the church there are plaques with the names of 118 Belarusians who perished recapturing the Bulgarian city of Pleven from the Turks.

in the interwar period the cemetery became the burial place of prominent statesmen, soldiers, scientists and people of creative professions.

Soviet authorities closed the church before World War II but during the German occupation services were resumed. After World War II the city authorities considered converting the church into a coffin workshop but the plans did not materialise and the church remained one of the few functioning places of worship in Soviet Minsk.

== Controversies ==
In 2018, improvements were announced by the city authorities and municipal workers began dismantling many fences and monuments, which were replaced by cheap concrete "headrests". Historians, restorers, and relatives of the buried argued that "the improvement is reminiscent of demolition," and called for the protection of the cemetery. The public initiative "Military Cemetery" was created, the participants of which improved the burials. After court proceedings brought by the descendants of the buried, the destruction of old graves stopped. However, the workers managed to "beautify" half of the cemetery and destroyed about 300 old tombstones.

== Notable interments ==
- Nadezhda Bantle (1851–1934), Belarusian physician
- Alexander Chervyakov (1892–1937), politician and revolutionary
- Kuźma Čorny (1900–1944), Belarusian poet, writer and dramatist
- Usievalad Ihnatoŭski (1881–1931), Belarusian politician, scholar and the first president of the National Academy of Sciences of Belarus
- Jazep Jucho (1921–2004), Belarusian lawyer, historian and writer, leading Belarusian authority on the laws of the Grand Duchy of Lithuania.
- Mikhas Klimkovich (1899–1954), Belarusian poet and librettist
- Yakub Kolas (1882–1956), Belarusian writer
- Yanka Kupala (1882–1942), Belarusian poet and writer
- Niescier Sakałoŭski (1902–1950), Belarusian composer
- Valancin Taǔlaj (1914–1947), Belarusian poet
- Paŭluk Trus (1904–1929), Belarusian poet
- Ruth Waller (1921–1946), member of the United Nations Relief and Rehabilitation Administration Mission in post-war Belarus who died after saving drowning Belarusian children.
