= Case of the Union of Liberation of Belarus =

1930–31 trial of Belarusian intellectuals in the Soviet Union

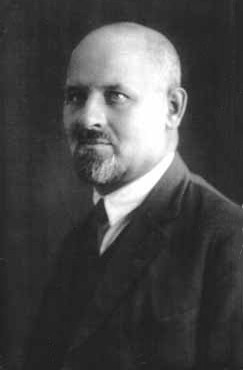
Vaclaw Lastowski, one of the victims of the case

The Case of the Union of Liberation of Belarus (Russian: Дело «Союза освобождения Белоруссии», romanized: Delo "Soyuza osvobozhdeniya Belorussii") was a political and criminal case initiated by the GPU of the Byelorussian Soviet Socialist Republic against several Belarusian scientists and culture activists. The case formed part of a wave of Soviet repressions in Belarus in 1929–1931. The GPU accused the victims of membership in a (presumably non-existent) anti-Soviet organization called the Union of Liberation of Belarus (Belarusian: Саюз вызвалення Беларусі, romanized: Sajuz vyzvalennia Biełarusi). Most of the accused were killed, or expelled to far-away regions of the USSR.

A case started with the arrest of the editor Piotar Iljučonak on February 17, 1930. During the spring and summer of 1930, 108 people were arrested. At the beginning the GPU saw Vaclaw Lastowski (former prime minister of the Belarusian People's Republic), Alaksandar Ćvikievič and Arkadź Smolič (former agriculture minister of the Belarusian People's Republic), as leaders of the organization. Later Alaksandar Adamovič (a Belarusian nationalist communist politician), Anton Balicki (statesman and writer), Piotar Iljučonak and Dźmitry Pryščepaŭ were viewed as such. People like the prominent poets Janka Kupała and Jakub Kołas or the first president of the Belarusian Science Academy Usievalad Ihnatoŭski were at certain stages accused of being members of the ULB.

All those arrested, except for 18 people, were sentenced to different terms of deportation. Usievalad Ihnatouski committed suicide on February 4, 1931. The supposed leaders of the ULB were sentenced to 10 years of deportation while most of the other members were deported to inner regions of the USSR for 5 years.

In 1937–1941 the case was heard again; many of the convicts were executed, some sent to concentration camps. In 1937–1939 many of the GPU executives who had worked on the case were also themselves executed. Another wave of repressions occurred in 1949–1952 against those former ULB membership suspects who were still alive at the time.

== List of suspects at the ULB case ==
- Dr. Anton Adamovič, literary historian
- Alaksandar Adamovič, statesman, executed in 1937
- Arkadź Adziniec, linguist, deported to Bashkortostan, fate unknown
- Cimafiej Adziarycha, pedagogue, fate unknown
- Michaił Adziarycha, pedagogue, executed in 1938
- Mikałaj Azbukin, geographer, died in prison
- Alaksandar Anichoŭski, pedagogue, deported to Ivanovo
- Todar Apacionak, pedagogue, sentenced to three years in concentration camps
- Adam Babareka, writer, died in concentration camp
- Hienadź Bahdanovič, pedagogue and social activist, died in prison
- Mikoła Bajkoŭ, pedagogue and linguist
- Anton Balicki, statesman, executed in 1937
- Chviedar Bandarčyk
- Pavał Bindziuk
- Piotar Buzuk, linguist, writer and pedagogue, executed in 1938
- Andrej Burdziejka
- Janka Bialkievič, linguist and pedagogue
- Jaŭhien Biadrycki
- Uładzisłaŭ Čaržynski
- Ničypar Čarnuševič
- Alaksandar Hałavinski
- Ryhor Haćko, pedagogue, fate unknown
- Maksim Harecki, writer, folklore researcher, executed in 1937
- Haŭryła Harecki
- Michajła Hramyka, writer, geologist and pedagogue, deported for 5 years
- Aleś Hurło, poet, translator, linguist
- Michaś Hurski
- Mikałaj Hutkoŭski
- Leŭ Daškievič
- A. Daraševič
- Siarhiej Dubinski, archeologist and historian, executed in 1937
- Uładzimier Duboŭka, poet, translator, deported
- Aleś Dudar
- Jazep Dyła, writer and statesman, deported
- D. Dyńko
- Branisłaŭ Epimach-Šypiła
- Usievaład Ihnatoŭski, politician and historian
- Piotar Iljučonak
- Chviedar Imšenik, literature scientist and pedagogue, fate unknown
- Michaś Kavyl
- Pavał Karavajčyk
- Mikałaj Kaśpiarovič
- P. Kaciarynič
- Symon Chursik
- Jaŭchim Kipiel, politician and pedagogue, deported
- Ivan Kiślakoŭ
- Mikałaj Krasinski
- Ivan Kraskoŭski, politician (former member of the government of the Ukrainian People's Republic) and pedagogue
- Janka Kupała, poet
- Feliks Kupcevič
- L. Kuryłovič
- Vacłaŭ Łastoŭski, former Prime Minister of the Belarusian Democratic Republic, executed in 1938
- Jazep Losik
- Jurka Listapad, politician
- Aleś Lažnievič
- Mikałaj Mamčyc
- Paŭlina Miadziołka, artist and pedagogue
- Michaił Mialeška
- Siarhiej Mialeška
- Adam Mickievič,
- U. Muraška
- Ściapan Niekraševič, politician and academician, one of the founders of the Institute of Belarusian Culture which later became the Belarusian Science Academy, executed in 1937
- Ivan Paškovič
- Uładzimier Prakulevič, politician, writer and lawyer, executed in 1938
- Dźmitry Pryščepaŭ
- Jazep Pušča (Płaščynski)
- R. Piacevič
- Časłaŭ Rodzievič
- Alaksandar Sak
- I. Sasinovič
- Jan Sierada, statesman, pedagogue and writer, the first President of the Belarusian Democratic Republic
- Siarhiej Skandrakoŭ
- Lavon Słuchanin
- Arkadź Smolič
- Jazep Sušynski
- Pavał Trampovič
- I. Traśko
- Ja. Trafimaŭ
- Alaksandar Ćvikievič, statesman, lawyer, philosopher, executed in 1937
- Ivan Ćvikievič
- Mikałaj Ułaščyk, historian, sent to concentration camp
- Vasil Šašalevič, poet and writer, died in concentration camp
- Alaksandar Šlubski, folklore researcher
- Paŭluk Šukajła
- Mikoła Ščakacichin, art researcher, pedagogue, died in prison
- Alaksandar Valkovič, statesman, executed in 1937
- Jazep Vasilevič
- Valeryjan Voły
- Mikałaj Janšyn
- Jeŭdakim Jaraščuk
- I. Juraškievič
- Todar Zabeła, historian
- Leanard Zajac, politician, died in prison
- Piotar Zianiuk
- Pavał Žaŭryd, military commander, died in prison
- Fłaryjan Ždanovič, actor and theatre director, sent to concentration camps and later possibly executed
- Uładzimier Žyłka, poet and literature critic, deported

== Sources ==
- Аркуш А. Рызыкоўная барацьба намэнклятуры // Наша Ніва, No.7.
- Сідарэвіч А. Трыюмвіры, або Помнік камісарам // Наша Ніва, No.13.

== See also ==
- Soviet repressions in Belarus
- 1937 mass execution of Belarusians
- 1931 Menshevik Trial
