= Sergei Shavel =

Soviet and Belarusian sociologist and scientist

Sergei Alexandrovich Shavel (Russian: Сергей Александрович Шавель; 17 October 1940 – 19 August 2023) was a Soviet and Belarusian sociologist, scientist, professor, expert in the field of theory, methodology, and methodology of sociological research, social structure of society, sociology of labor, sociology of consumption. He held the degree of candidate of philosophical sciences (1977) and the degree of doctor of sociological sciences (1990). He was the head of the Department of Social Theory and Methodology at the Institute of Sociology of the National Academy of Sciences of Belarus.

== Biography ==
Sergei Shavel was born on October 17, 1940, in Gerutevo, a village in the Svisloch district of the Grodno region.

In 1958, Shavel enrolled in the Vyborg Aviation School. After completing his studies in 1961, he started working as a technician at the Kremenchuk Helicopter School. However, he was subsequently terminated from his position.

In 1964, he enrolled at Moscow State University, specifically in the Faculty of Philosophy. In the year 1969, following the completion of his studies at Moscow State University, he was admitted as a junior researcher at the Institute of Philosophy and Law under the BSSR Academy of Sciences.

In 1974, he started working as a senior researcher in the sociological laboratory at the Belarusian State University.

In 1981, Shavel received admission to the Institute of Philosophy and Law of the Academy of Sciences of the BSSR as a senior researcher specializing in historical materialism and the methodological challenges associated with sociological research.

In 1990, he emerged as a pioneer in Belarus by effectively safeguarding his thesis for attaining the Doctor of Sociological Sciences degree. The subject matter of his thesis revolved around the correlation between the social sphere and the motivation behind labor.

Next year he assumed the role of deputy director at the Institute of Sociology of the Academy of Sciences of the Republic of Belarus, concurrently serving as the voluntary head of the department responsible for theory, methodology, and sociological research techniques.

In 2002, he assumed the role of leading the department responsible for studying and applying theoretical frameworks and methodologies in sociological research. In 2008, he became Director of the Center for Sociocultural Development.

In 2022, he was Chief Scientific Associate in the Department of Sociology of the Social Sphere at the Institute of Sociology of the National Academy of Sciences of Belarus.

Sergei Shavel is the author of over 220 scientific works, including 32 monographs.

== Awards ==
- Certificate of Honor of the Moscow Executive Committee for creative contribution to the elaboration of a comprehensive plan of economic and social development (1977)
- Certificate of Merit of the Ministry of Internal Affairs and SSSO of the BSSR for high performance in work and in connection with the 60th anniversary of the BSSR (1978)
- The gratitude of the Institute of Sociology of the National Academy of Sciences of Belarus for many years of fruitful work and outstanding personal contribution to the sociological science of the Republic of Belarus (1998)
- Diploma of the Council of Ministers of the Republic of Belarus for significant personal contribution to the development of sociology, many years of scientific and organizational activity, and training of scientific personnel (2009)
