= Di komunistishe velt =

Yiddish language journal from Moscow 1919–1920

Di komunistishe velt (Yiddish: די קאָמוניסטישע וועלט, 'The Communist World') was a Yiddish language journal published biweekly from Moscow 1919–1920. It was an organ of the Jewish Commissariat. The journal was published The first issue of Di komunistishe velt was published on 1 May 1919 by Samuel (Shmuel) Agurskii - a former anarchist from the United States having joined the Bolsheviks.

As publication of Der Emes was interrupted in the midst of the Russian Civil War, Di komunistishe velt came to function as the central party organ in Yiddish. The Jewish Commissariat recruited a non-Bolshevik, Daniel Charney, for the position as editor-in-chief of Di komunistishe velt.

Debates on Yiddish language reform played out in the issues of Di komunistishe velt.
