= Jazep Jucho =

Belarusian lawyer, historian, and writer

- Iosif Jucho
- Born: 19 March 1921; Minsk
- Died: 29 July 2004 (aged 83); Minsk
- Resting place: Military Cemetery (Minsk)
- Occupations: lawyer, historian, academic
- Employer: Law Department of the Belarusian State University
- Known for: a leading Belarusian researcher of the laws of the Grand Duchy of Lithuania

Jazep Jucho (19 March 1921 - 29 July 2004; also known as Iosif Jucho, Belarusian: Язэп Юxo or Iосiф Юxo) was a prominent Belarusian lawyer, historian and writer and a leading Belarusian authority on the laws of the Grand Duchy of Lithuania.

== Early years and career ==
Jucho was born in Minsk into a large working-class family on 19 March 1921. He finished a local school in 1938 and enrolled in a polytechnic.

However in 1939 he was conscripted into the Red Army and finished World War II as a decorated Soviet major having been wounded in action.

After the war, Jucho completed graduate and post-graduate studies at the Minsk Law Institute and the Belarusian Academy of Sciences. For most of his career he worked in different positions at the Law Department of the Belarusian State University.

He became “the founder of the academic studies of the history of the Belarusian state and law” in Soviet Belarus.

During Gorbachev’s Perestroika, Jucho actively participated in the Belarusian national revival movement - see Belarusian Democracy Movement.

He took part in the drafting of the 1994 Belarusian Constitution and other legislative acts of newly independent Belarus.

== Leading authority on Grand Duchy of Lithuania laws ==
In 1963 Jucho began studying the period of the Grand Duchy of Lithuania (of which Belarus was part) - something he would continue for the rest of his career. He prepared a course of lectures on the subject and researched the origin of the Statutes of the Grand Duchy of Lithuania, a 16th-century codification of the legislation of the [Grand Duchy written in the Ruthenian language (precursor to modern Belarusian).

The topic of his PhD dissertation in 1980 was “The Socio-Political Order and Rights in Belarus in the 16th century” (Belarusian: Грамадзка-палітычны лад і права Беларусі ў XVI ст.).

Jucho explored political and jurisprudential ideas of Francis Skaryna and concluded that Skaryna had a significant influence on the drafting of the first Statute.

He also studied the effects of the Union of Krewo (1385), the Pact of Vilnius and Radom (1401), the Union of Horodło (1413), the Union of Lublin (1569) and the Constitution of 3 May 1791 on the sovereignty of the Grand Duchy.

== Works ==
Yucho’s works include:

- Правовое положение населения Белоруссии в ХVI ст. [The Legal Status of the population of Belarus in the 16th century], Minsk, 1978 (in Russian)
- Францыск Скарына і яго час [Francis Skaryna and His Time], Minsk, 1988 (a co-author; in Belarusian)
- За вольнасьць нашу і вашу [For Yours and Our Freedom], Minsk, 1990 (a book about the [Kościuszko Uprising]; in Belarusian)
- Крыніцы беларуска-літоўскага права [The Sources of Belarusian-Lithuanian Law], Minsk, 1991 (in Belarusian)
- Кароткі нарыс гісторыі дзяржавы і права Беларусі [A Short Outline of the History of the Belarusian State and Laws], Minsk, 1992 (in Belarusian)
- Гісторыя дзяржавы і права Беларусі (1917—1994) [History of the Belarusian State and Laws (1917-1994)], Minsk, 2000 (a co-author; in Belarusian)
- Статут Вялікага Княства Літоўскага 1566 года [The Statute of the Grand Duchy of Lithuania of 1566], Minsk, 2003 (a co-author; in Belarusian)

== Death ==
Jucho died in Minsk on 29 July 2004 and is buried in the Minsk Military Cemetery.
