= Uładzimir Žyłka =

Belarusian poet

Uladzimir Zhylka
- Уладзімір Жылка
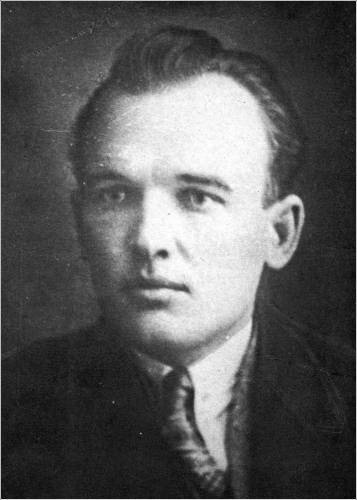
- Uladzimir Zhylka
- Born: 27 May 1900; Makaszy, Russian Empire
- Died: 1 March 1933 (aged 32)
- Occupation: Poet

Uladzimir Zhylka (Belarusian: Уладзімір Жылка; 27 May 1900, in Makaszy near Nesvizh, Russian Empire – 1 March 1933) was a Belarusian poet.

== Biography ==
He was an author of symbolistic love lyrical poetry and patriotic-independence related poems (Na rostani). He translated works of Adam Mickiewicz, Henrik Ibsen, and Charles Baudelaire.

In 1926, he emigrated to East Belarus, where he was arrested by the NKVD in 1930 as part of the Case of the Union of Liberation of Belarus and sentenced for 5 years to concentration camps in the Vyatka region.

He died in 1933.
