= Jazep Pušča =

Belarusian writer

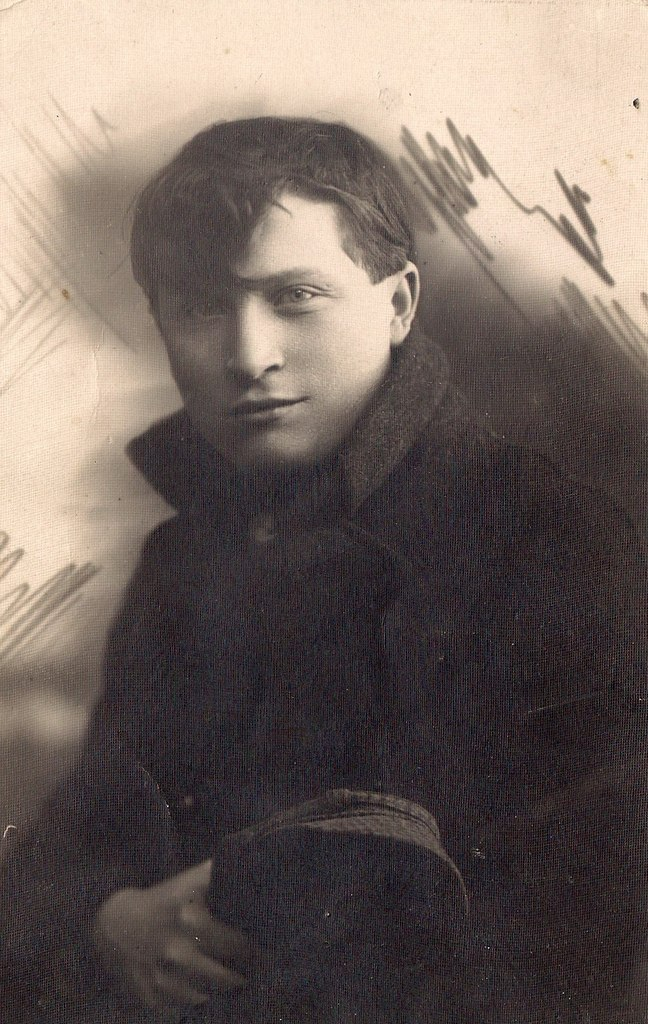
Jazep Pušča in 1925

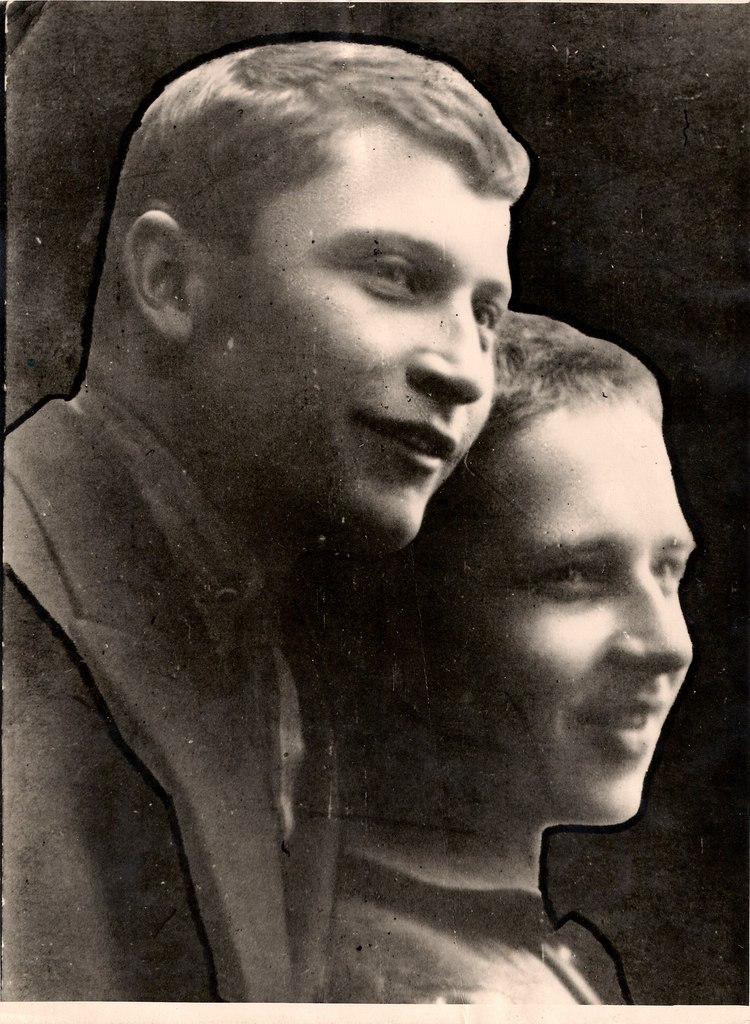
Pušča with writer Aleś Dudar

Jazep Pušča, born Iosif Paulavich Plaščinski, (Belarusian: Язэп Пушча / Язэп Паўлавіч Плашчынскі, (20 May [O.S. 7 May] 1902 — 14 September 1964) was a Belarusian poet, writer, critic and translator.

== Biography ==
Pušča was born in Karališčavičy in Mińsk County. He studied literature at Minsk University from 1918 until 1921. In 1921-22, he was a study listener in Belarusian courses in the Byelorussian SSR. In 1922 he released a collection of short stories, and in 1923 he became one of the founders of the literary groups Maladniak and Uzvyshsha. He published poetry collections from 1925 to 1930. In 1925, he was educated at the Belarusian State University and he abandoned his teaching and he moved to Minsk. For a while, he was working as a style editor in the Belarusian State Publishing House. In 1927, he moved to Leningrad to study.

On 25 July 1930, Pušča was arrested in connection with the Case of the Union of Liberation of Belarus. On 10 April 1931, he was sentenced to five years imprisonment by the Joint State Political Directorate and was sent to Shadrinsk.

From 1937 to 1942 he worked as a teacher in the Muromosk area. During World War Two he was a soldier and fought at the front. After the war he returned to Murumosk. On 30 January 1956, he was sent to rehab at the Khrushchev Thaw for two years. In 1958, he returned to Minsk, where he spent his final years.

He died on 14 September 1964, aged 62, and was buried at his birthplace in Karališčavičy.
