= Leanard Zajac =

Belarusian politician

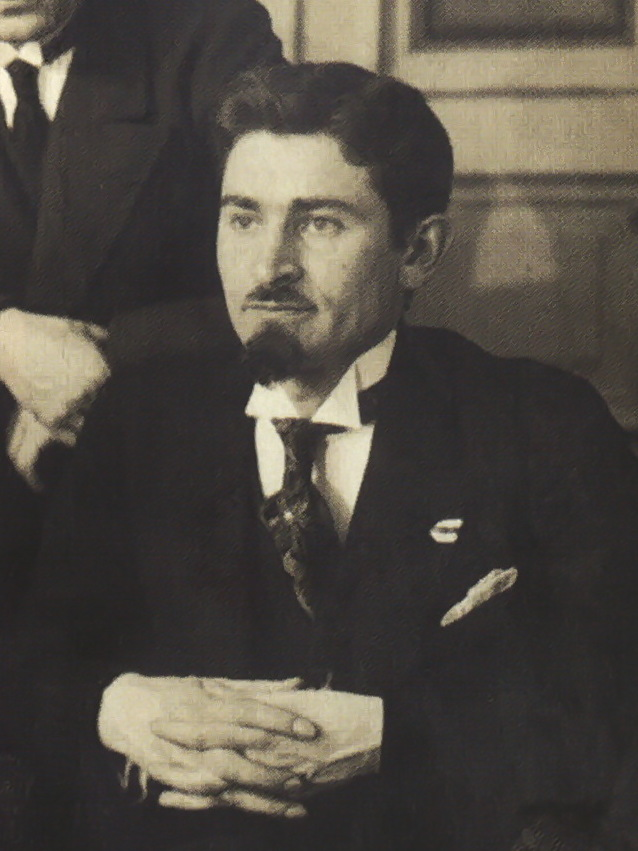

Secretary of People's Secretariat of Belarus
- In office 21 February 1918 – 26 May 1918
- Preceded by: position established
- Parliamentary group: Belarusian People's Socialist Party, Belarusian Socialist-Revolutionary Party

State Controller of Belarusian Democratic Republic
- In office from the second half of November, 1918
- Preceded by: position established

Head of the Diplomatic Mission of the Belarusian People's Republic in the German Reich
- In office 25 August 1919 – 27 October 1919
- Preceded by: position established
- Succeeded by: Leanid Barkou

Member of the Rada of the Belarusian Democratic Republic
- In office 26 December 1917 – 14 December 1919
- Preceded by: position established

Bureau member of the Belarusian National Committee
- In office 7–9 April 1917 – 23 July 1917
- Preceded by: position established
- Succeeded by: position terminated

Secretary of the Belarusian Provisional Government
- In office 12 July 1918 – 22 July 1918
- Preceded by: position established
- Succeeded by: position terminated

Personal details
- Born: March, 1890 Dawhinava
- Died: 23 September 1935 Ufa

Leanard Iosifawicz Zajac (Belarusian: Леана́рд Іо́сіфавіч За́яц, or Lawon Jazepawicz Zajac, Belarusian: Ляво́н Язэ́павіч За́яц, Russian: Леона́рд Ио́сифович За́яц; born in March 1890 in Dawhinava, died on 23 September 1935 in Ufa) was a Belarusian political activist, journalist, and author of memoirs. He was a delegate to the First All-Belarusian Congress and from 1918 held various positions in the Belarusian Democratic Republic, including government secretary, state controller, and head of the diplomatic mission in Berlin. He was imprisoned by the Soviet authorities and died in captivity.

== Early life ==
He was born in the village of Dawhinava, in the Vileysky Uyezd of the Vilna Governorate of the Russian Empire, now in the Vilyeyka District of the Minsk Region of Belarus. He graduated from the Leningrad State University, obtaining a law degree. From 1914 to 1916, he worked at the Vilyeyka Excise Office, and from 1916 to 1917, he served as the first (responsible) secretary of the Minsk Branch of the All-Russian Union of Landowners.

=== Beginnings of activity in the Belarusian movement ===
Since at least 1916, he had been in contact with the Belarusian national movement, attending meetings of its activists at the "Belarusian Hut" on Zacharzewskaya Street in Minsk. From March 1917, he was a member of the Belarusian People's Socialist Party, a group with a constitutional-democratic program. From April 7 to April 9, 1917, he participated as a representative of the Belarusian People's Socialist Party in the congress of Belarusian national organizations in Minsk, which advocated for the autonomy of Belarus within a democratic federation of Russia. During this congress, he was elected as a member of the presidium of the Belarusian National Committee. He belonged to the leadership of this organization, which determined its direction of activity. During another congress of Belarusian organizations and national parties on July 21–23, 1917, in protest against the actions of delegates from the Belarusian Socialist Assembly, he and delegates from the Belarusian People's Socialist Party left the meeting. On 23 July 1917, the Belarusian National Committee was dissolved.

In July 1917, Leanard Zajac participated in municipal elections and won a seat as a deputy in the Minsk City Pride on the Belarusian People's Socialist Party list.

=== The First All-Belarusian Congress and the Belarusian Democratic Republic ===
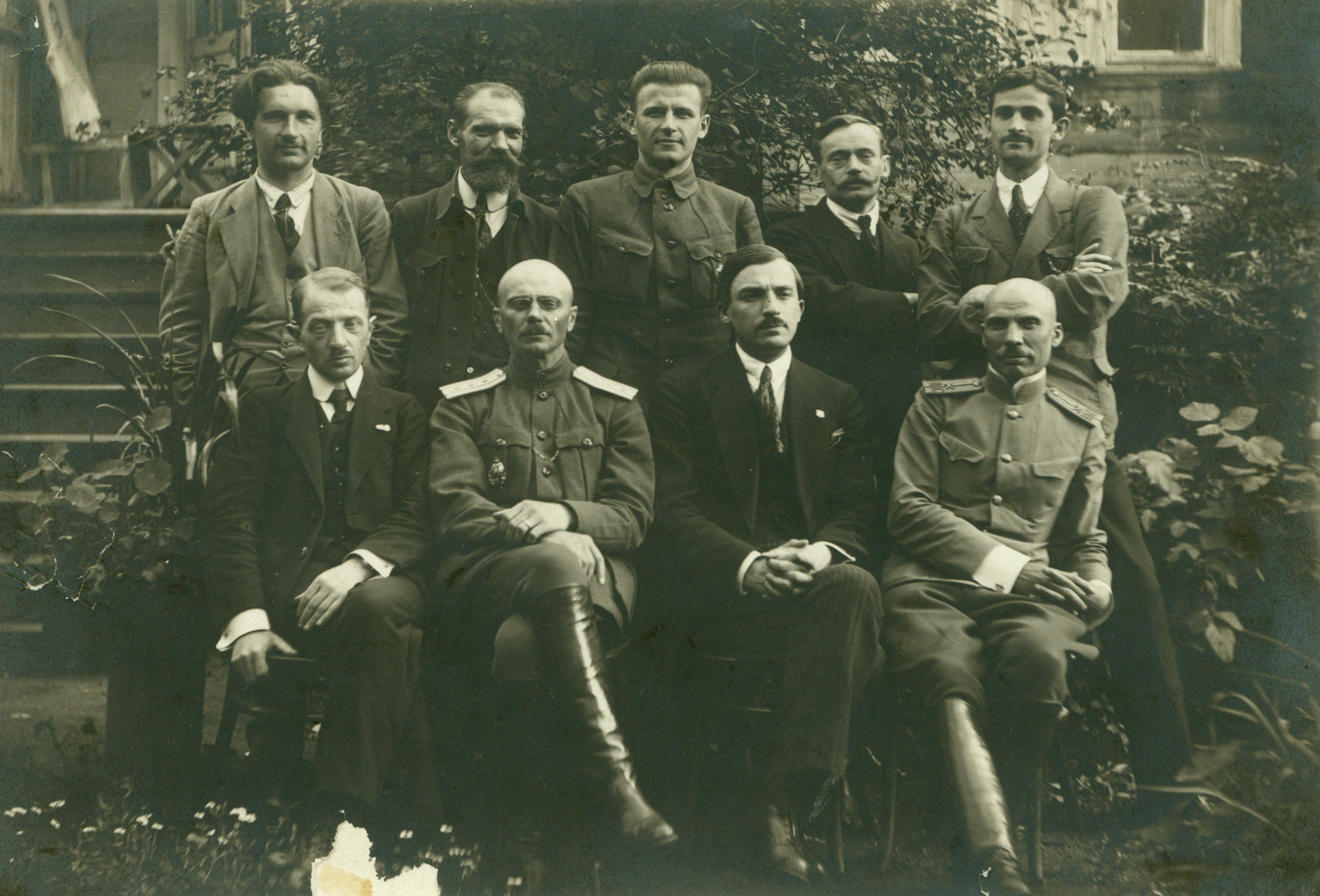
Belarusian People's Secretariat; Leanard Zajac at the back, first from the right

Leanard Zajac participated in the First All-Belarusian Congress, held from December 18 to December 30, 1917, in Minsk. During the congress, on 26 December 1917, he was elected as a member of the Rada of the Belarusian Democratic Republic. On 21 February 1918, he assumed the position of secretary in the Secretariat of Belarus, established by the Rada, which served as the embryo of the future Belarusian Democratic Republic government. (Note: On 9 March 1918, the Executive Committee of the Council of the All-Belarusian Congress promulgated the Second Constitutional Hramota, in which it announced the establishment of the Belarusian Democratic Republic. As a result of this decision, the Council of the All-Belarusian Congress changed its name to the BRL Council (Paszkou (1996, pp. 232–234)).) He continued to work in this capacity after the declaration of independence of the Belarusian Democratic Republic on 25 March 1918, in the People's Secretariat of Belarus under the leadership of Jazep Varonka. In late April and May 1918, due to a split in the Belarusian Socialist Assembly, he supported the Belarusian Party of Socialist-Revolutionaries, but by May 14, he belonged to the so-called Block faction, which included the Belarusian Socialist Assembly, Belarusian Party of Socialist-Federalists, Belarusian Social Democratic Party, and Belarusian People's Party of Socialists. On 9 June 1918, he did not find a place in the new government under the leadership of Raman Skirmunt, but he continued to work as a secretary in Jazep Varonka's office, who did not recognize Skirmunt's government and operated in parallel. On 12 July 1918, he became a member of the Belarusian Temporary Government, established by Jazep Varonka in opposition to Skirmunt's People's Secretariat of Belarus. On 22 July 1918, he joined the committee for international affairs of the new People's Secretariat of Belarus under the leadership of Jan Sierada. In mid-November 1918, he was appointed by the next head of government, Anton Luckievich, as the state controller.

After Minsk and then Vilnius were occupied by the Bolsheviks, Leanard Zajac moved between 1918 and 1919 to Grodno, which was still occupied by the Germans. There, alongside Prime Minister Anton Luckievich, he continued his activities within the structures of the Belarusian Democratic Republic. In the first days of January 1919, he was appointed by Luckievich to the Temporary City Committee established by the Germans, where he represented Belarusians. On 9 February 1919, he participated in a meeting organized by Luckievich with Belarusian organizations, during which a decision was made to initiate negotiations with the Polish government regarding the establishment of a Polish-Belarusian federation. However, the condition was the recognition by the Polish side of the Belarusian Democratic Republic Council of Ministers as the official government of Belarus, which did not happen. On 19 March 1919, in Grodno, he attended another Belarusian meeting, this time representing the Belarusian Social Democratic Party. On 22 March 1919, along with a group of Belarusian Democratic Republic politicians, he left Grodno and went to Berlin, where on May 4, he established the Belarusian Democratic Republic Diplomatic Mission in Germany. Initially, he acted as the acting head, and from August 25, he became the head of the Mission. On 27 October 1919, the Mission was downsized by Luckievich, and Leanard Zajac was ordered to return to Minsk with government funds. However, he did not comply with the orders. According to another source, he was dismissed from the position of mission head for health reasons.

=== Activities after the split of the Rada of the Belarusian Democratic Republic ===
After the split of the Rada of the Belarusian Democratic Republic on December 13–14, 1919, Leanard Zajac became the head of the office and state secretary in the People's Council of the Belarusian Democratic Republic. In October 1920, he temporarily headed the Belarusian Press Bureau in Berlin. In 1925, he lived in political exile in Czechoslovakia, where he underwent treatment in a sanatorium and wrote memoirs. In 1925, he participated in the Second All-Belarusian Conference in Berlin, during which he recognized the Soviet authorities in Minsk as the only center for the national and state revival of Belarus. In the same year, he returned to the Byelorussian Soviet Socialist Republic. He served as a consultant-inspector at the Budget Office of the People's Commissariat of Finance of the Byelorussian Soviet Socialist Republic. On 19 July 1930, he was arrested by the Joint State Political Directorate of the Byelorussian Soviet Socialist Republic and accused of involvement in the fictional anti-Soviet "Case of the Union of Liberation of Belarus". On 10 April 1931, he was found guilty of membership in a counter-revolutionary organization and anti-Soviet agitation. He was sentenced to 5 years of exile in Ufa, in Bashkir Autonomous Soviet Socialist Republic. On 25 July 1935, he was arrested again by the NKVD. He died in prison during the investigation on 23 September 1935.

On 10 June 1988, he was rehabilitated.

== Works and filing of documents ==
Leanard Zajac is the author of journalistic articles and memoirs about Belarusian cultural figures. He was also one of the main custodians of documents from the Belarusian Democratic Republic at a time when most of its structures had ceased to function.

=== Works ===
- "Maksim Bahdanowicz", Szlach paeta: Zbornik uspaminau i bijahraficznych materyjałau pra Maksima Bahdanowicza (in Belarusian), Minsk, 1975

== Private life ==
Leanard Zajac suffered from tuberculosis for many years, at least since 1916. He had been an acquaintance of the Belarusian poet Maksim Bahdanovič since the fall of 1916.

== Bibliography ==
- Marakou, Leanid (2003). Represawanyja litaratary, nawukoucy, rabotniki aswiety, hramadskija i kulturnyja dziejaczy Biełarusi, 1794–1991. Enc. dawiednik. U 10 t. (in Belarusian). Minsk: [s.n.] ISBN 985-6374-04-9. Archived from the original on 2015-03-19.
- Michaluk, Dorota (2010). Białoruska Republika Ludowa 1918–1920. U podstaw białoruskiej państwowości (in Polish). Toruń: Wydawnictwo Naukowe Uniwersytetu Mikołaja Kopernika. ISBN 978-83-231-2484-9.
- Paszkou, Hienadź, ed. (1996). Encykłapiedyja historyi Biełarusi u 6 tamach. Himnazii – kadencyja (in Belarusian). Vol. 3. Minsk: "Biełaruskaja encykłapiedyja" imia Pietrusia Brouki. ISBN 985-11-0041-2.
