= Usievalad Ihnatoŭski =

Belarusian politician and scholar (1881–1931)

- Усевалад Ігнатоўскі
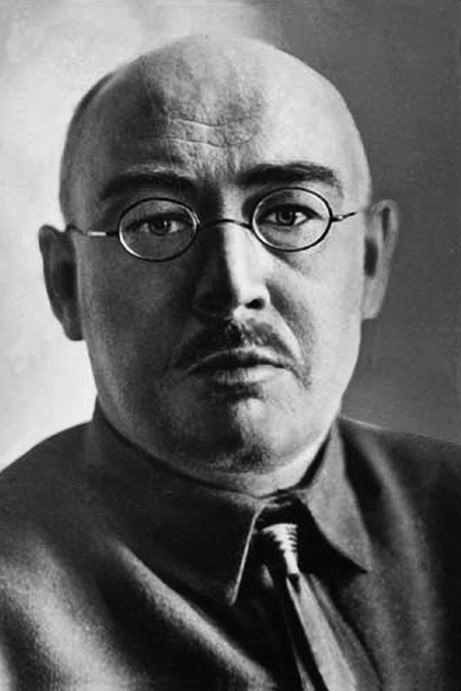
- Born: 19 April 1881; Takary, Grodno Governorate, Russian Empire
- Died: 4 February 1931 (aged 49); Minsk, Byelorussian SSR, Soviet Union
- Burial place: Military Cemetery (Minsk)
- Known for: author of "A Short Outline of the History of Belarus" (1919); author of the first Belarusian study of the January Uprising of 1863-1864

Academic background
- Education: University of Tartu

Academic work
- Discipline: History of Belarus
- Institutions: Minsk Teachers' Institute, Belarusian State University, National Academy of Sciences of Belarus

Usievalad Makaravich Ihnatoŭski (Belarusian: Усевалад Макаравіч Ігнатоўскі, romanized: Usyevalad Makaravich Ihnatowski; Russian: Все́волод Мака́рович Игнато́вский, romanized: Vsevolod Makarovich Ignatovsky; 19 April 1881 — 4 February 1931) was a Belarusian politician, scholar and the first president of the National Academy of Sciences of Belarus.

== Early years ==
Ihnatoŭski, the son of a teacher, was born in the village of Takary, Hrodna governorate of the Russian Empire (now Kamianiec district of Brest region in Belarus).

After finishing local schools, he studied history and philology at St. Petersburg University, but was expelled for revolutionary activities and was a member of the Socialist Revolutionary Party from 1901. He spent some time in various prisons and in exile in the North of Russia but ultimately graduated from Dorpat (Tartu) University in 1911. In 1912-14 he worked as a teacher in Vilnia and in 1914 became a teacher at the Minsk Teachers' Institute.

== Involvement in the Belarusian independence movement ==
Ihnatoŭski established close ties with various Belarusian activists and became actively involved in the Belarusian independence movement during World War I. In 1915 he created the cultural and educational organisation "Our Homeland" (Belarusian: Наш Край) which in 1917 became the socialist revolutionary organisation "Young Belarus" (Belarusian: Маладая Беларусь).

In 1917 he became a member of the Central Committee of the Belarusian Socialist Assembly (Hramada) and in 1918 - the Central Committee of the Belarusian Social-Revolutionary Party. He was one of the proponents and "fathers" of Soviet Belarus who took part in the signing of the "Declaration of Independence of the Soviet Socialist Republic of Belarus".

== Career in Soviet Belarus ==
Ihnatoŭski joined the Communist Party in 1920 and held numerous important party and government posts in Soviet Belarus. He actively participated in the implementation of the policy of Belarusisation in the 1920s and significantly influenced it.

He also played a significant role in the enlargement of the territory of Soviet Belarus in 1924 and 1926.

He became professor at the Belarusian State University in 1921. In 1926 he became the chairman of the Institute of Belarusian Culture and in 1929 the first President of the National Academy of Sciences of Belarus.

== Academic work ==
Ihnatoŭski authored over 30 academic works, the best known of which is A Short Outline of the History of Belarus (1919) - which became the standard textbook for nearly a decade in Soviet Belarus and formed the basis of the concept of the national history of Belarus.

He is also known as the author of the first Belarusian study of the January Uprising of 1863-1864 - the monograph "The year of 1863 in Belarus: an account of events" (1930).

== Persecution and death ==
When the Soviets began their campaign against the so-called Belarusian National Democrats in 1929, Ihnatoŭski came under strong attack for his convictions and efforts to maintain the independent development of Belarusian research and keep his close ties with the Belarusian national leadership of the revolutionary years. In December 1930, he was removed as President of the National Academy of Sciences of Belarus and the following month expelled from the Communist Party as "a leader of the national-democratic counterrevolution."

He was called for questioning at the State Political Directorate (GPU) in connection with the Case of the Union of Liberation of Belarus and after one such interrogation committed suicide on 4 February 1931. An alternative version of events is that he was shot dead by GPU officers in his house.

Ihnatoŭski was buried in the Minsk Military Cemetery the following morning, secretly from friends and colleagues.

His family was also persecuted by the Soviet authorities in 1937 “as family members of a traitor”. His wife was sentenced to eight years in the Gulag prison camps and his two sons were executed.
