= Ściapan Niekraševič =

Belarusian independence activist

- Сцяпан Некрашэвіч
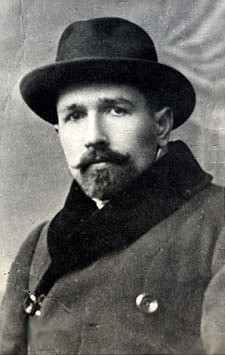
- Born: May 8, 1883 the estate of Daniłoŭka, Minsk province, Russian Empire (present-day Gomel Region, Belarus)
- Died: December 20, 1937 (aged 54)
- Cause of death: executed by Soviet authorities
- Education: Vilna Teachers' Institute
- Occupation: Belarusian linguist
- Known for: Vice President of the Belarusian Academy of Sciences

Ściapan Niekraševič (Belarusian: Сцяпан Некрашэвіч), also known as Stepan Nekrashevich (Russian: Степан Некрашевич; 8 May 1883 – 20 December 1937) was a Belarusian academic, political figure and a victim of Stalin's purges.

== Early years ==
Niekraševič was born in the estate of Daniłoŭka in Minsk province of the Russian Empire (nowadays in Śvietłahorsk district of Homiel region of Belarus) into the family of a petty nobleman. He graduated from the Vilna Teachers' Institute in 1913 and embarked on a teaching career.

During World War I he was conscripted into the Russian Imperial Army.

== Involvement in the Belarusian independence movement ==
While in the army, Niekraševič became involved with an organisation of Belarusian soldiers on the Romanian Front and in 1917 organised a conference in the city of Odessa. He published a bulletin for Belarusians in southern Ukraine.

He accepted the authority of the Belarusian Democratic Republic and agreed to represent the Rada of the Belarusian Democratic Republic in southern Ukraine and, in particular, held negotiations with representatives of the French military in Odessa on behalf of the Rada.

== Academic career in Soviet Belarus ==
Niekraševič returned to Soviet Belarus around 1920 and became actively involved in establishing Belarusian schools and cultural institutions. He was appointed the first Chairman of the Institute of Belarusian Culture, the forerunner of the Belarusian Academy of Sciences and in 1929 became vice president of the academy.

During the 1920s and 1930s he published a number of scholarly works, including a Russian-Belarusian Dictionary (together with Mikoła Bajkoŭ) and a standard dictionary of the Belarusian language.

Niekraševič is considered to be an “obsessed linguist” who “continued the traditions of [19th century Belarusian linguist] Yefim Karsky and developed them at a new level”.

== Persecution, death and exoneration ==
In October 1929, the authorities of Soviet Belarus ordered "the dismissal of academic Vaclaŭ Lastoŭski from the duties of the Permanent Secretary of the Belarusian Academy of Sciences and academic Ściapan Niekraševič from the duties of Vice President of the Belarusian Academy of Sciences" for allowing publications within the academy espousing “views that are completely incompatible with the policies of the Soviet government, and sometimes views hostile to the Soviet government”.

In 1930 Niekraševič was arrested and exiled to the Udmurt ASSR in Soviet Russia. He was rearrested in November 1937 and on 19 December of the same year sentenced to death.

Niekraševič was posthumously exonerated first during the Khrushchev's Thaw in 1957 and completely during Gorbachev's Perestroika in 1988.
