= Zuyevka, Republic of Bashkortostan =

Zuyevka Зуевка
- Village
- Location within Bashkortostan Location within Russia
- Coordinates: 55°44′N 56°44′E
- Country: Russia
- Region: Bashkortostan
- District: Karaidelsky District
- Time zone: UTC+5:00

Zuyevka (Russian: Зуевка) is a rural locality (a village) in Urgushevsky Selsoviet, Karaidelsky District, Bashkortostan, Russia. The population was 107 as of 2010. There are 3 streets.

== Geography ==
Zuyevka is located 33 km southwest of Karaidel (the district's administrative centre) by road. Urgush is the nearest rural locality.
