= Zuyevsky (rural locality) =

Zuyevsky (Russian: Зу́евский; masculine), Zuyevskaya (Зу́евская; feminine), or Zuyevskoye (Зу́евское; neuter) is the name of several rural localities in Russia:

- Zuyevsky, Novosibirsk Oblast, a settlement in Krasnozyorsky District of Novosibirsk Oblast
- Zuyevsky, Perm Krai, a settlement in Oktyabrsky District of Perm Krai
- Zuyevskaya, Arkhangelsk Oblast, a village in Tarnyansky Selsoviet of Shenkursky District of Arkhangelsk Oblast
- Zuyevskaya, Kirov Oblast, a village under the administrative jurisdiction of Oktyabrsky City District of the city of Kirov, Kirov Oblast
- Zuyevskaya, Vologda Oblast, a village in Maryinsky Selsoviet of Vozhegodsky District of Vologda Oblast
