= Institute of Mathematics (National Academy of Sciences of Belarus) =

Coordinates: 53°55′09″N 27°36′10″E

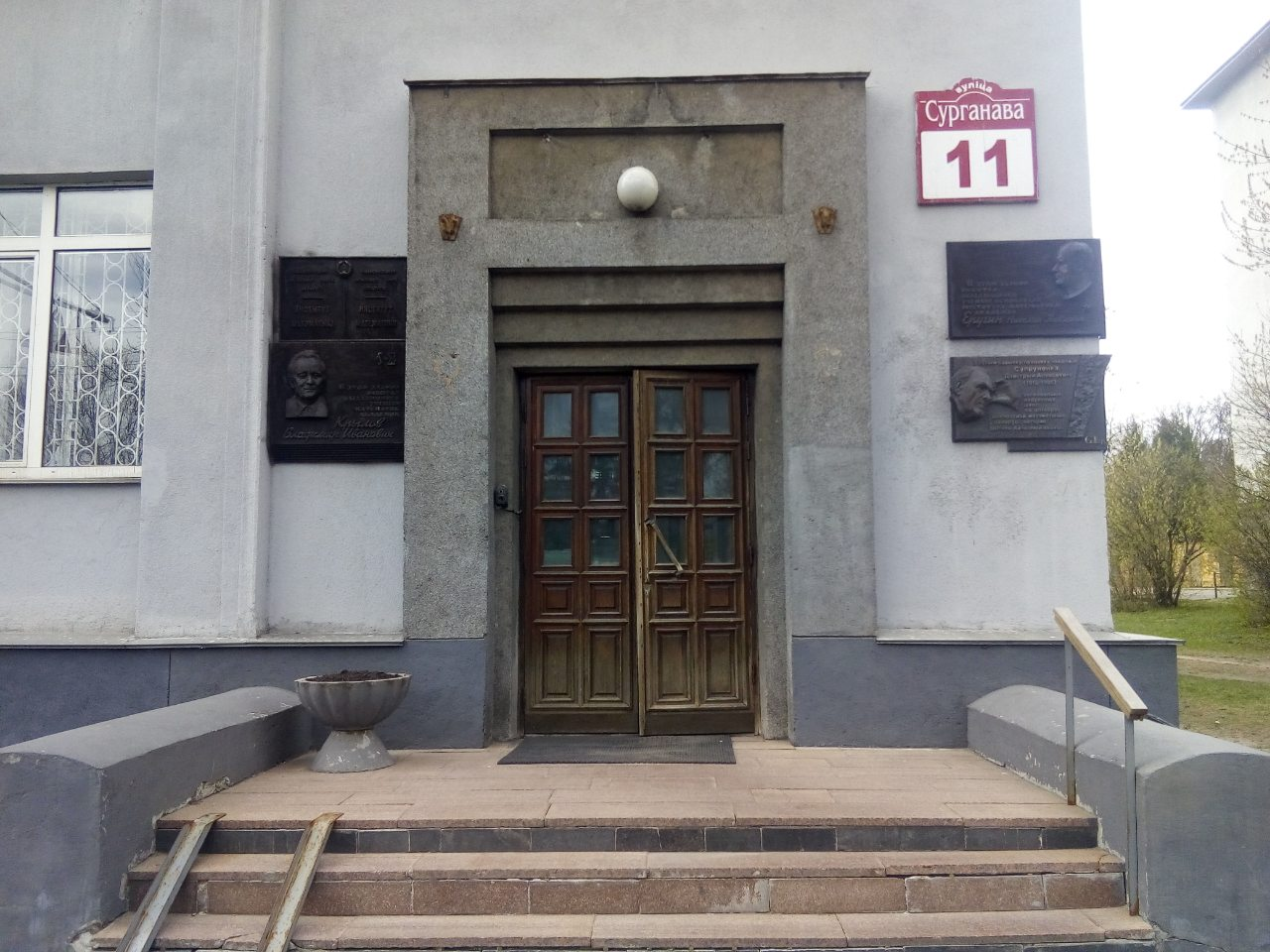
Institute of Mathematics, main entrance. Minsk, 2019

The Institute of Mathematics of the National Academy of Sciences of Belarus is headquartered in Minsk, with a division in Gomel.

== History ==
The institute was stablished in 1959 on the basis of mathematical laboratories and the laboratory of electronic computers of the Institute of Physics and Mathematics of the BSSR Academy of Sciences. Initially its name was the Institute of Mathematics and Computer Technics of the Academy of Sciences of the BSSR.

== Departments ==
As of 2024 the Institute has the following departments:

- Algebra
- Computational Mathematics and Mathematical Modelling
- Differential Equations
- Finite Croup Theory and Applications (in Gomel)
- Nonlinear and Stochastic Analysis

== Directors ==
- Nikolay Yerugin (1959-1977)
- Vladimir Platonov (1977-1992)
- Ivan Gaishun (1992-2018)
