= Zuyevsky District =

Zuyevsky District Зуевский район (Russian)
- District
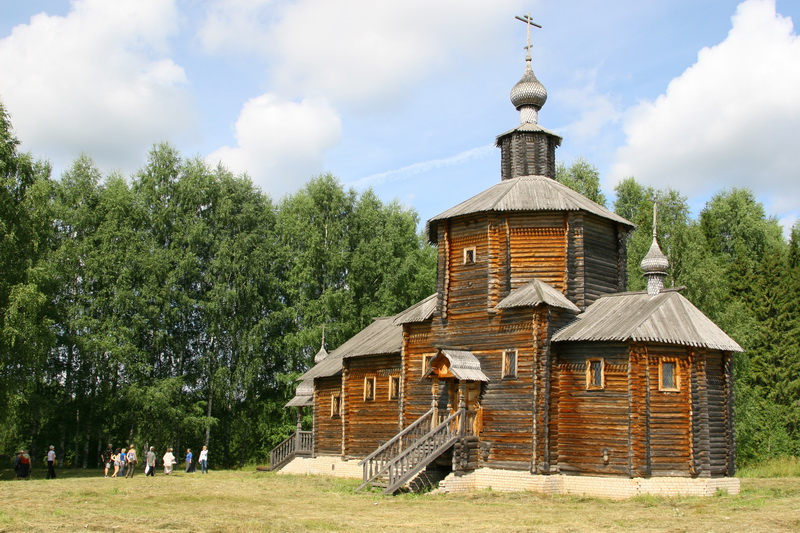
- Church with Ryabovo, Zuyevsky District

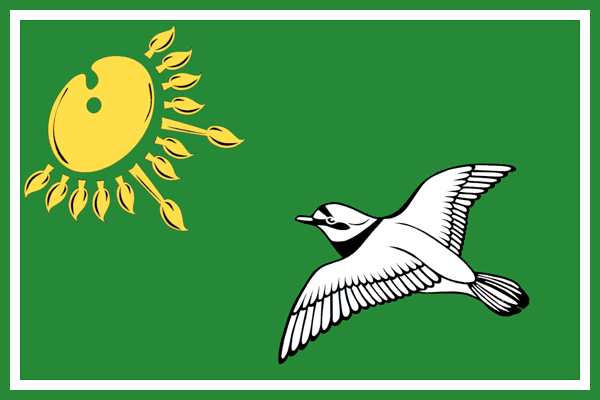
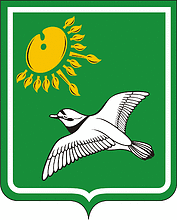
- Flag Coat of arms
- Location of Zuyevsky District in Kirov Oblast
- Coordinates: 58°24′N 51°08′E
- Country: Russia
- Federal subject: Kirov Oblast
- Established: 15 July 1929
- Administrative center: Zuyevka

Area
  - Total: 2,820 km^{2} (1,090 sq mi)

Population (2010 Census)
  - Total: 22,586
  - Density: 8.01/km^{2} (20.7/sq mi)
  - Urban: 57.5%
  - Rural: 42.5%

Administrative structure
  - Administrative divisions: 1 Towns, 10 Rural okrugs
  - Inhabited localities: 1 cities/towns, 82 rural localities

Municipal structure
  - Municipally incorporated as: Zuyevsky Municipal District
  - Municipal divisions: 1 urban settlements, 10 rural settlements
- Time zone: UTC+3 (MSK)
- OKTMO ID: 33614000
- Website: http://zrko.ru/

Zuyevsky District (Russian: Зу́евский райо́н) is an administrative and municipal district (raion), one of the thirty-nine in Kirov Oblast, Russia. It is located in the east of the oblast. The area of the district is 2,820 square kilometers (1,090 sq mi). Its administrative center is the town of Zuyevka. Population: 22,586 (2010 census); 27,823 (2002 Census); 36,023 (1989 Soviet census). The population of Zuyevka accounts for 49.6% of the district's total population.
