= Zuyevka, Kirov Oblast =

Town in Kirov Oblast, Russia

Zuyevka Зуевка
- Town
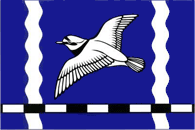
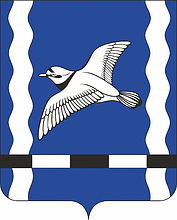
- Flag Coat of arms
- Interactive map of Zuyevka
- Location of Zuyevka Zuyevka (Kirov Oblast)
- Coordinates: 58°24′N 51°09′E
- Country: Russia
- Federal subject: Kirov Oblast
- Administrative district: Zuyevsky District
- TownSelsoviet: Zuyevka
- Founded: 1899
- Town status since: 1944
- Elevation: 140 m (460 ft)

Population (2010 Census)
  - Total: 11,198
  - Estimate (2021): 9,767 (−12.8%)

Administrative status
  - Capital of: Zuyevsky District, Town of Zuyevka

Municipal status
  - Municipal district: Zuyevsky Municipal District
  - Urban settlement: Zuyevskoye Urban Settlement
  - Capital of: Zuyevsky Municipal District, Zuyevskoye Urban Settlement
- Time zone: UTC+3 (MSK)
- Postal codes: 612410, 612412
- OKTMO ID: 33614101001

Zuyevka (Russian: Зу́евка) is a town and the administrative center of Zuyevsky District in Kirov Oblast, Russia, located 121 kilometers (75 mi) east of Kirov, the administrative center of the oblast. Population: 11,198 (2010 census); 12,600 (2002 census); 16,112 (1989 Soviet census).

== History ==
It was founded in 1899 as a settlement servicing the construction of the Perm–Kotlas railway. It was named after a nearby eponymous village. Town status was granted to it in 1944.

== Administrative and municipal status ==
Within the framework of administrative divisions, Zuyevka serves as the administrative center of Zuyevsky District. As an administrative division, it is incorporated within Zuyevsky District as the Town of Zuyevka. As a municipal division, the Town of Zuyevka is incorporated within Zuyevsky Municipal District as Zuyevskoye Urban Settlement.
