= National Academy of Sciences of Belarus =

Academy in Minsk, Belarus

Coordinates: 53°55′14″N 27°35′55″E

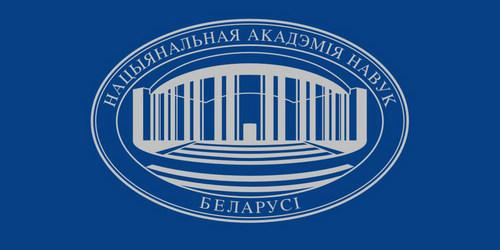
- Abbreviation: NANB / НАНБ
- Formation: 1 January 1929; 97 years ago
- Type: National academy
- Headquarters: Minsk, Belarus
- President: Vladimir Karanik
- Website: nasb.gov.by

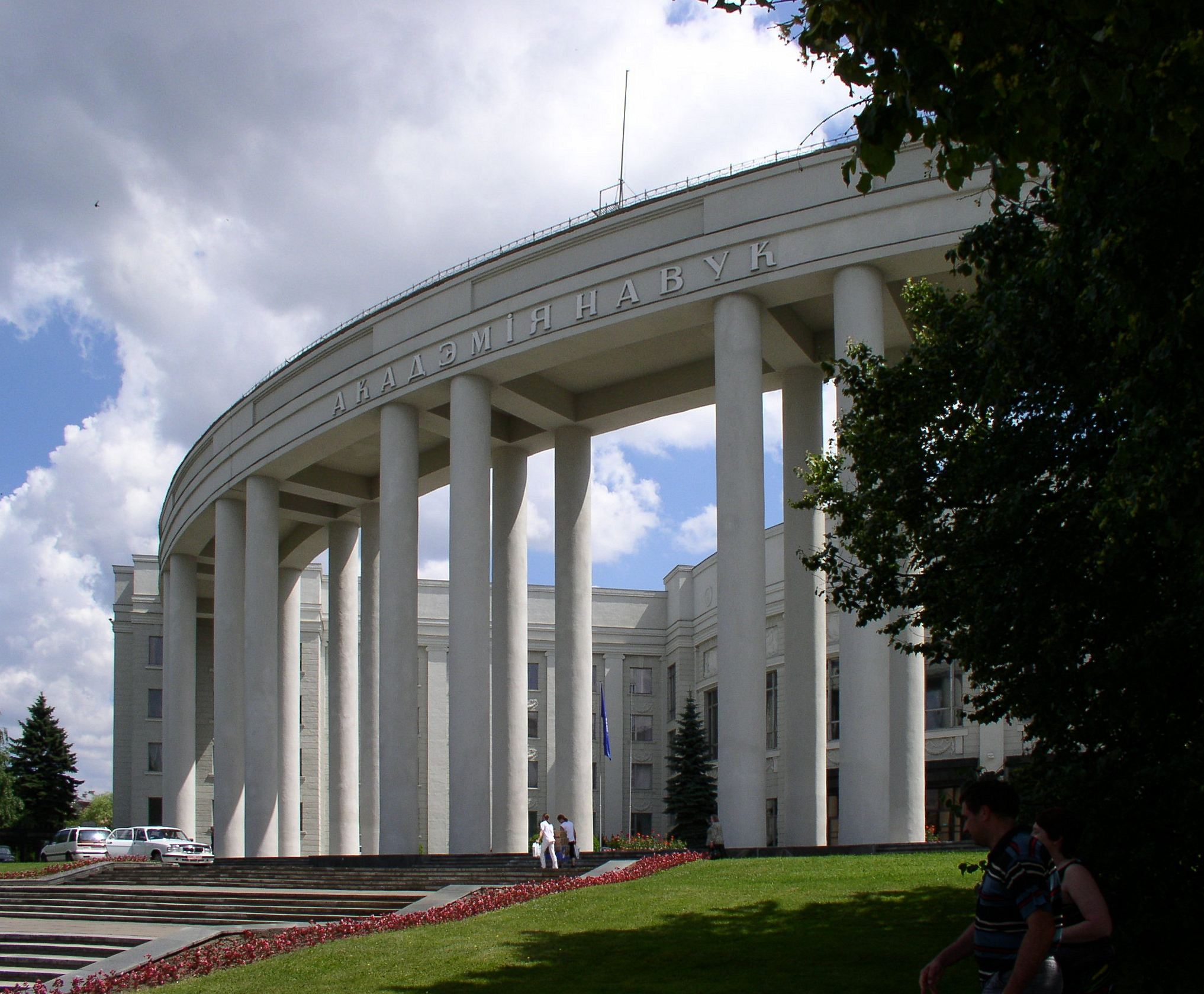

The National Academy of Sciences of Belarus (NASB; Belarusian: Нацыянальная акадэмія навук Беларусі, romanized: Nacyjanalnaja akademija navuk Biełarusi; Russian: Национальная академия наук Беларуси, romanized: Natsional'naya akademiya nauk Belarusi, НАН Беларуси, NAN Belarusi, НАНБ, NANB) is the national academy of Belarus.

== History ==
=== Inbelkult - predecessor to the Academy ===
The Academy has its origins in the Institute of Belarusian Culture (Inbelkult), a Belarusian academic and research institution founded on 30 January 1922.

In the early 1920s, a key policy of newly established Soviet Belarus was the advancement of science, aimed at accelerating the technological, economic and social development of the republic and resolving a broad range of regional issues. The idea of creating a Belarusian academic and research institution was discussed during 1920 - 1921 and by November 1921, a commission consisting of academicians Yefim Karsky, Jazep Dyla and Ściapan Niekraševič prepared a founding charter of Inbelkult. Pursuant to the charter, Inbelkult was both research and cultural-educational institution, a multidisciplinary organisation focusing on ethnographic, linguistic, literary, artistic, cultural, historical, natural and geographical studies. The first meeting of Inbelkult took place on 30 January 1922, which is considered its foundation date.

At first Inbelkult consisted of two departments - ethnological-linguistic and natural science and had among its members a number of prominent academics, poets and writers such as Ściapan Niekraševič (who was the first Chairman of Inbelkult), Yefim Karsky, Jasep Losik, Janka Kupala, Jakub Kolas, and Źmitrok Biadula. Meticulous work was carried out to standardise the modern Belarusian language and between 1922 – 1924 six compilations of Belarusian terminology were published comprising 15 thousand Belarusian terms. In 1923, archaeological and ethnographic expeditions were carried out and the publication of a monthly magazine in this area was initiated. Works of Inbelkult's academics were published in "The Notes of the Department of Nature and National Economy" and "The Notes of the Department of Humanities".

In July 1924, the government of Soviet Belarus designated Inbelkult "the highest state academic institution" whose role was to coordinate all academic work in the republic, with a right to organise museums, libraries and archives, convene academic conferences and carry out expeditions. Inbelkult was able to purchase foreign publication and research tools duty-free. In January 1925, Usievalad Ihnatoŭski was appointed as new chairman of Inbelkult. By 1926, the number of Inbelkult's departments has grown to include Belarusian language and literature, Belarusian art, historical and archeological (since 1927 socio-historical), the study of the revolutionary movement in Belarus, natural sciences, medicine, agriculture and others. The institute also had two ethnic minorities departments, Jewish and Polish, with independent academic commissions. The Institute also boasted its own library and a natural history museum.

By the end of the 1920s, Inbelkult has attained significant academic achievements in the areas of humanities and natural sciences and further broadened its studies, which prompted the Soviet Belarusian government to reorganise Inbelkult into the Belarusian Academy of Sciences on 1 January 1929.

=== Academy in Soviet Belarus ===
During the Soviet period, the Academy was called the Belarusian Academy of Sciences in 1929–1936 and the Academy of Sciences of the Byelorussian SSR in 1936–1991. The first president of the Academy was Usievalad Ihnatoŭski (1881-1931), Belarusian politician and historian, professor of the Belarusian State University.

Although at inception the Academy had only 128 staff members, among them 87 scientists, it became a leading academic center influencing the economic, technological, social and cultural development of Soviet Belarus. By 1941 the Academy had grown to 750 staff and 12 subdivisions.

Stalin's purges caused great damage to the Academy's intellectual potential. The first chairman of Inbelkult and famous linguist Ściapan Niekraševič was executed in 1937 and the first president of the Academy Usievalad Ihnatoŭski committed suicide in 1931.

During World War II the normal activity of the Academy was severely interrupted. Some scientists continued their research at institutions in Russia and other regions of the former Soviet Union but many employees of the Academy were conscripted. Scientific laboratories, equipment, buildings and library funds were burned or looted. In 1945, the total number of employees of the Academy was only 360 people. However the Academy was rapidly rebuilt after the war. Right after the war's end, eight institutes started their activity again and by 1951 the Academy had 29 subdivisions with 1234 staff including 33 academicians. The Academy was supported by the governments of Belarus and the USSR as well as by leading scientific centres in Moscow, Leningrad and other Soviet cities.

Many USSR-wide fame scientists were members of the National Science Academy of Belarus. Scientists like Panas Achrem (chemistry), Mikałaj Barysievič (physics), Fiodar Fiodaraŭ (physics), Vienijamin Vaciakoŭ (medicine, biology), Uładzimier Ułaščyk (medicine, biology).

=== Academy in independent Belarus ===
After Belarus gained its independence, the Academy continued its work as the Academy of Sciences of Belarus between 1991–1997. In 1997, it was reorganised as the National Academy of Sciences with the status of the highest state scientific organization of Belarus, responsible for coordinating and conducting fundamental and applied scientific research.

The main tasks of the Academy are defined by legislation as:

- scientific support for the economic, social and state-legal development of the Republic of Belarus, its culture, as well as the rational use and protection of nature;
- organisation and coordination of fundamental and applied scientific research carried out by all subjects of scientific activity, including in the fields of nano- and biotechnologies, robotics, fundamental and applied scientific research, developments in the most important areas of natural, technical, humanitarian, social sciences and arts in order to obtaining new knowledge about a person, society, nature and artificially created objects, increasing the scientific, technical, intellectual and spiritual potential of the Republic of Belarus;
- implementation of a unified state policy, coordination and state regulation of the activities of organizations in the field of exploration and use of outer space for peaceful purposes, with the exception of planning, distribution and efficient use of the radio frequency spectrum;
- organising and conducting research into the polar regions of the Earth;
- ensuring the introduction of domestic technologies in pharmaceuticals, agro-industrial complex, biotechnological production, industries of new materials and other high-tech sectors of the economy;
- implementation of scientific and methodological support for the organisation of fundamental and applied scientific research carried out by all subjects of scientific activity;
- determination and submission for approval in the manner prescribed by law of lists of priority areas of fundamental and applied scientific research of the Republic of Belarus;
- identification of fundamentally new ways of scientific and technological progress, participation in the development of recommendations on the use of the achievements of domestic and world science in practice;
- ensuring the development of science in the Republic of Belarus;
- implementation, together with the State Committee for Science and Technology, of accreditation of scientific organisations;
- creation of conditions for the development of scientific schools, training of highly qualified scientists, advanced training of scientists and specialists, including in foreign scientific centers;
- making, in the prescribed manner, proposals for financing scientific, scientific, technical and innovative activities in the Republic of Belarus;
- conducting monitoring and operational sociological research;
- organising and conducting monitoring of the flora and geophysical monitoring, monitoring of the fauna and integrated monitoring of natural ecological systems in specially protected natural areas within the framework of the National Environmental Monitoring System in the Republic of Belarus, scientific support for maintaining state cadastres of flora and fauna.

== Organization ==
=== Research facilities ===
==== Scientific-application centers ====
The scientific-application centers (Научно-практические центры, Scientific and Practical Centers) were introduced by Lukashenko's decree in 2006. Their emphasis is the problems of vital interest for the economical development of the country. The first centers of this kind created in 2006 specialize in agriculture. Later in 2006 an e-commerce

- Scientific and Practical Center for Arable Farming
- Scientific and Practical Center for Animal Breeding
- Scientific and Practical Center for Potato, Vegetable and Fruit Growing
- Scientific and Practical Center for Agriculture Mechanization
- Scientific and Practical Center for Foodstuffs
- Inter-branch Scientific and Practical Center for Identification Systems and E-business Operations

==== Research institutes and centers ====
- Central Botanic Garden
- Grodno Zonal Institute of Plant Growing
- Institute of Applied Physics
- Institute of Arable Farming and Selection
- Institute of Bioorganic Chemistry
- Institute of Biophysics and Cell Engineering
- Institute of Chemistry of New Materials
- Institute of Economics
  - The Center of Agricultural Economics
- Institute of Electronics
- Institute of Experimental Botany
- Institute of Experimental Veterinary Medicine
- Institute of Flax
- Institute for Fish Industry
- Institute of Forest
- Institute for Fruit Growing
- Institute of General and Inorganic Chemistry
- Institute of Genetics and Cytology
  - The National Co-ordination Centre for BioSafety
- Institute of Geochemistry and Geophysics
- Institute of Heat and Mass Transfer
- Institute of History
- Institute for Land Reclamation
- Institute of Linguistics
- Institute of Literature
- Institute of Mathematics
- Institute for Meat and Milk Industry
- Institute of Mechanics of Metal-Polymer Systems
- Institute of Metal Technology
- Institute of Microbiology
- Institute of Molecular and Atomic Physics
- Institute of Philosophy
- Institute of Physical Organic Chemistry
- Institute of Physics
- Institute of Physiology
- Institute of Plant Protection
- Institute for Problems of Natural Resources Use and Ecology
- Institute of Radiobiology
- Institute of Sociology
- Institute for Soil Science and Agrochemistry
- Institute of State and Law
- Institute of Study of Arts, Ethnography and Folklore
- Institute of Technical Acoustics
- Institute for Vegetable Crops
- Institute of Zoology
- Joint Institute of Machine Building
- Joint Institute of Power and Nuclear Research - "Sosny"
- Joint Institute of Solid State and Semiconductor Physics
- Physical-Engineering Institute
  - Scientific and Engineering Center "Plasmoteg"
- Polessian Agrarian-Ecological Institute
- Powder Metallurgy Institute
- Republican Scientific and Engineering Center for Remote Sensing of Environment "Ecomir"
- Research Center of Resource-Saving Problems
- Scientific-Engineering Enterprise "Geoinformation Systems"
- Scientific and Production Center "The Institute of Pharmacology and Biochemistry"
- United Institute of Informatics Problems

=== Design facilities ===
- Unitary enterprise Metallopolimer
  - Development and production of equipment for grading and recycling of polymer secondary materials.
  - Development and production of equipment for application of polymer powder coatings.
  - Production of equipment for recovery of building refuse.
  - Manufacture of fibrous-porous materials
- Unitary enterprise Nuklon
  - Development and organization of manufacture of laser-optical and spectral devices for scientific research, medicine, ecologies, equipment for processing of milk, vegetable growing, hothouses, electric drives for wheelchairs, electro bicycles
- R&D center CKB
  - machine building, instrument manufacturing, optical production
- R&D center Axicon
  - Design and manufacturing of spectral devices for composition, structure and properties of matter control and for medical-biological measurements; optoelectronics devices for control of environmental parameters and technological processes; solid-state lasers and tunable dye lasers; meters of laser radiation wavelength; high-resolution laser spectrometers; glass and crystalline optical elements; unified mechanical assemblies for breadboard of schemes of optical, laser and spectral devices; printed-circuit boards
- Design Bureau "Academical" ("ОКБ Академическое")
  - Experimental-design works of power plant engineering type on manufacturing the complex installation for scientific investigations and equipment for industrial use. Design and manufacturing of reservoir equipment; vessels, working under pressure; heat-exchange apparatus, hermetic machines and sealing units, rectification installation and other equipment

=== Experimental facilities ===
- Scientific Experimental Station on Sugar Beet
- Agricultural Experimental Station of Minsk, Mogilev and Vitebsk Oblasts
- Experimental bases of the Institute of Forest

=== Libraries, museums, archives ===
- Yakub Kolas Central Scientific Library
- Belarusian Agricultural Library
- Museum of History of the National Academy of Sciences of Belarus
- Museum of Ancient Belarusian Culture
- Museum of Boulders of the Institute of Geochemistry and Geophysics, a unique collection of glacial boulders of over 2,000 glacial stones
- NANB Central Scientific Archive

=== "Belarusian Science" publishing house ===
Previously known as Навука і Тэхніка (Navuka i Tekhnika, meaning "Science and Technology").
