= Grand Duchy of Lithuania and Belarus =

Proposed state in Eastern Europe (1918)

The Grand Duchy of Lithuania and Belarus (Polish: Wielkie Księstwo Litewsko-Białoruskie; Belarusian: Вялікае Княства Літоўска-Беларускае, romanized: Vialikaje Kniastva Litoŭska-Bielaruskaje) was a political project proposed in 1918 by the leaders of the conservative indigenous Catholic and Polish-speaking nobility of the Minsk Governorate (primarily members of the Minsk Agricultural Society). The project envisioned the creation of a new state governed by a constitutional monarchy on the lands of Belarus and Lithuania (the Northwestern provinces of the former Russian Empire) under the curatorship (protection) of the German Empire. The capital was to be Vilnius.

The project represented both the local liberal-conservative nobility's desire to create a joint Belarusian-Lithuanian state separate from Russia and Poland, and an alternative to the creation of possibly socialist republics in Belarus and Lithuania. The attempt to create the GDLB is one of the episodes in the struggle of local conservative nobles, led by Edward Woyniłłowicz (1847–1928), to realise the idea of the political subjectivity of the Lithuanian-Belarusian lands (or Belarus alone) in 1917–1921.

== History of the project ==
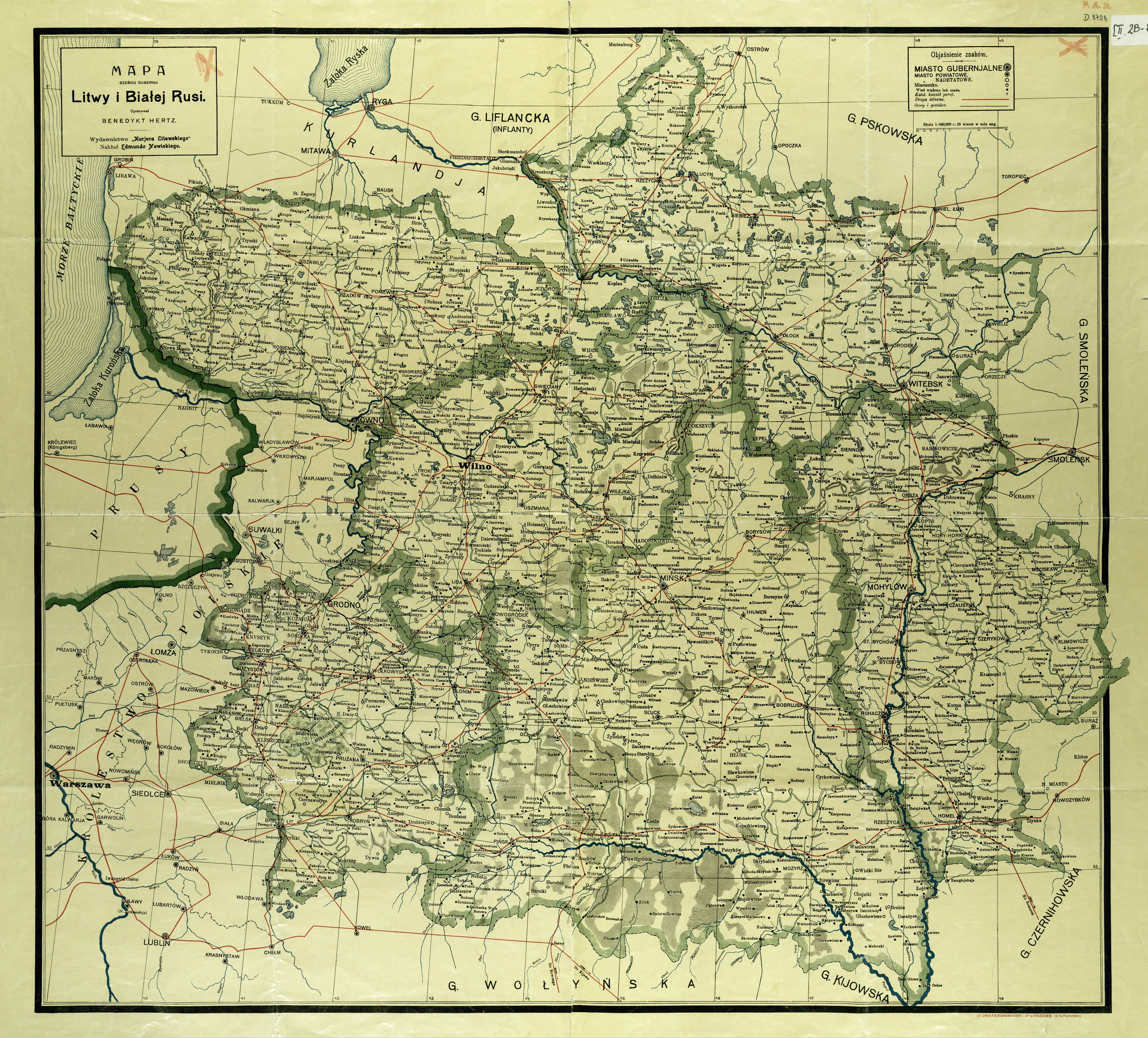
"Map of the six governorates of Lithuania and White Ruthenia", published by the newspaper Kurier Litewski, between 1905 and 1910.

The initiators of the creation of the GDLB in 1918 were the leaders of the conservative indigenous Catholic and Polish-speaking landed nobility of the Minsk Governorate. Many of them were leaders and members of the Minsk Agricultural Society (MAS), as well as former representatives of the liberal-conservative Krajowcy (Regionalist) movement, who had previously (in 1905–1907) demanded political subjectivity for the Lithuanian-Belarusian governorates (Northwestern Krai) from the Russian authorities and society in the form of autonomy within the Russian Empire. The leader of the conservative Krajowcy was Edward Woyniłłowicz, the chairman of the MAS. Although the influence of the liberal-conservative Krajowcy movement in the Lithuanian-Belarusian lands peaked in 1905–1911, the leaders of this movement in the Minsk, Mogilev, and Vitebsk governorates did not abandon the idea of the political subjectivity of these lands even afterwards. Even during the Russian Empire, Minsk conservative nobles expressed views at closed meetings of the Minsk Society of Agriculture that the planned independent Belarusian-Lithuanian state should have a constitutional monarchy system and support liberal conservatism (respect for private property rights; legal equality of all languages, cultures, and religions; support for family values and religiosity; development of the education system and universal literacy; abolition of estate distinctions, etc.). Karol Niezabytowski (1865–1952), one of the society's leaders, once aphoristically stated at a meeting that a "republic" would lead to "cutting the public" (a play on words: рэспубліка republika – рэж публіку rezh publiku). Vilnius was planned as the capital of the Grand Duchy.

=== 1917 ===
==== March–November ====
After the overthrow of the Russian autocracy during the February Revolution (1917) and the establishment of the Russian Provisional Government in Petrograd, the leaders of the MAS, led by Edward Woyniłłowicz, moved towards realising the political subjectivity of Belarus, although they did not postulate a clearly defined form—this depended on changing external circumstances. Through the vice-chairman of the MAS, Raman Skirmunt, Edward Woyniłłowicz's closest friend and right-hand man, the Minsk conservative nobles sought to influence socialist parties and organisations in the Minsk Governorate. They aimed to secure a moderate program of agrarian reforms in Belarus (preventing the abolition of private land ownership and nationalisation without compensation) and, in mid-April 1917, sought to achieve autonomy for Belarus within Russia from the Provisional Government, as well as the introduction of the Belarusian language and history in schools, democratic elections to local authorities, compensation for war damages, and more.

==== November: Requesting German arrival in Minsk ====
After the October Revolution in Russia and the establishment of Bolshevik power in Petrograd (which abolished private land ownership via the Decree on Land on 26 October 1917), the MAS leaders sent a delegation of representatives of the Polish Council of the Minsk Land across the front line to meet with German General Max Hoffmann (1869–1927) in Brest-Litovsk. They proposed that the Germans occupy Belarusian territory up to the Dnieper River, promising assistance by creating their own military units.

After the meeting in Brest, the delegation went to Warsaw to establish contact and achieve rapprochement with the semi-independent pro-German Polish Regency Council of the Kingdom of Poland. Their plans were guided by the principle "anything but Russia". The leaders of the MAS, also guided by the principle of maintaining the political subjectivity of Belarus, declared to the Polish Regency Council via their delegates that they desired Belarus's exit from the influence of Bolshevik Russia, but "without the intention of directly incorporating Belarus into Poland". The Regency Council in Warsaw included a longtime friend of Count Jerzy Hutten-Czapski, priest Zygmunt Chełmicki.

=== 1918 ===
==== February: German conquest of Minsk ====
The result of the agreement was the German offensive on Minsk in February 1918. The German military authority (10th Army) rejected the claims to power of Jazep Varonka's People's Secretariat of Belarus and reacted negatively to its socialist composition and statements about "defending the gains of the revolution". Instead, they accepted a welcoming address and memorial from the conservative nobles, signed by Edward Woyniłłowicz among others, and approved the creation of the Minsk Belarusian Representation on 25 February 1918, headed by Raman Skirmunt.

When German troops entered Minsk without a fight on 21 February 1918, Minsk landowners (Ignacy Witkiewicz, Edmund Iwaszkiewicz, Czesław Krupski and other members of the MAS and the Polish Council of the Minsk Land), including Raman Skirmunt and Paviel Aliaksiuk, expressed gratitude to German General Hoffmann in a welcoming speech at the Vilnius Station "for the return of social order, help in separating from Bolshevism and living together with the peoples of the West relying on the German state".

==== March–May: Competition from the Belarusian People's Republic ====
The conservative nobles (supporters of a capitalist state) faced competition from Belarusian socialist parties and organisations in the process of creating Belarusian statehood. The declaration of independence of the Belarusian People's Republic (BNR) on 25 March 1918 in German-occupied Minsk, which began to be created as a socialist state, was perceived negatively by the conservative Minsk nobles: the Second Constituent Charter of the BNR adopted on 9 March 1918 declared the abolition of private land ownership in its seventh point.

Raman Skirmunt, inducted into the Rada of the BNR on 12 April 1918, oriented the Rada toward cooperation with the German military administration in Minsk and Germany. On Skirmunt's initiative, on 25 April 1918, the Chairman of the Rada of the BNR Jan Sierada, the Chairman of the People's Secretariat Jazep Varonka, members of the Rada Raman Skirmunt, Paviel Aliaksiuk, Jazep Losik, and others sent a secret telegram to the German Emperor, in which they announced their desire for an independent and indivisible Belarus in alliance with the German Empire. On the recommendation of the German military command in Minsk, the formation of a new cabinet of ministers of the BNR was entrusted to Raman Skirmunt. In May 1918, Skirmunt travelled to Berlin as a delegate of the BNR, where he unsuccessfully petitioned for an audience with the German Emperor.

Nevertheless, according to Belarusian historian Zachar Šybieka, it was only under the protection of the 10th German Army, brought to Minsk and the Minsk Governorate by local conservative Catholic and Polish-speaking landowners, that it was possible to deploy the creation of real elements of the BNR's power structures – the Rada, local councils in the districts – and to issue BNR passports, engage in international activities, open Belarusian-language schools and publish newspapers, and restore the activities of the Church, except for the creation of the BNR's own army and police, which the Germans did not allow. Šybieka believes that without German guarantees, amid the lack of interest and aggressive intentions of close neighbours (Russia, Ukraine, Poland, and Lithuania), it is unlikely that such a phenomenon as the BNR – an important experience in creating Belarusian statehood in the 20th century – could have occurred.

==== June ====
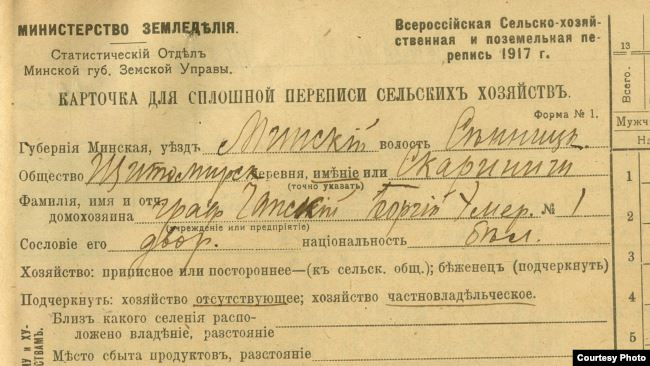
Card from the All-Russian Agricultural Census of 1917, where Count Jerzy Hutten-Czapski personally indicated his nationality as "Belarusian".

On 16 June 1918, the so-called "Woyniłłowicz group" in Minsk addressed a Declaration to the commander of the German 10th Army, General Erich von Falkenhayn, asking for assistance in recognizing the independence of the Belarusian state:

"The General Meeting of the Minsk Agricultural Society, consisting of loyal sons and citizens of this country, expresses a fervent wish that Belarus, a country rich in historical, state traditions and ethnographic distinctiveness, a country with its own culture, with the help of the powerful German Reich, will be recognized as an independent state following the example of Lithuania and Ukraine and will flourish in alliance with the Central European states."

This Declaration was signed by representatives of the MAS (Edward Woyniłłowicz, Mieczysław Porowski, Witold Łopatt, Zygmunt Rewieński, Ignacy Witkiewicz), the Union of Landowners (Count Jerzy Hutten-Czapski, Aleksander Lubański, Lew Wańkowicz, Michał Wołłowicz), and the Union of Minsk Nobility (Ludwik Uniechowski, Hieronim Kieniewicz, Józef Święcicki). In July 1918, the head of the Representation of the Regency Council of the Kingdom of Poland in Berlin, Count Adam Ronikier, received an order to acquaint the public of the German Empire and the Austro-Hungarian Empire with this document through the press. The cover letter to the order indicated that the Minsk landowners supported the independence of Belarus proclaimed by the Rada of the BNR, and their position was not connected with the Polish national movement.

==== July ====
Raman Skirmunt, entrusted with forming a new cabinet of ministers of the BNR from 9 July 1918 and supported by MAS leaders and conservative nobles, immediately proposed revising the seventh point of the BNR's Second Constituent Charter on the agrarian question. With the approval of conservative noble landowners, Skirmunt proposed a compromise on the land issue to the Belarusian socialist parties (selling part of the landowners' land to peasants in small allotments at a price corresponding to their real value), but could not achieve an understanding with the socialists.

Ultimately, on 20 July 1918, Raman Skirmunt's cabinet was forced to officially resign, and the formation of a new cabinet on a coalition basis was entrusted to Ivan Sierada. The intention of the local conservative noble landowners was to form the BNR army of 200,000 soldiers at their own expense (financing was also promised by Vilnius bankers), which was crucial for strengthening Belarusian statehood. However, the German political leadership in Berlin was in no hurry to recognize and support Belarusian statehood and the formation of the Belarusian army.

== Appeal to the German Emperor ==
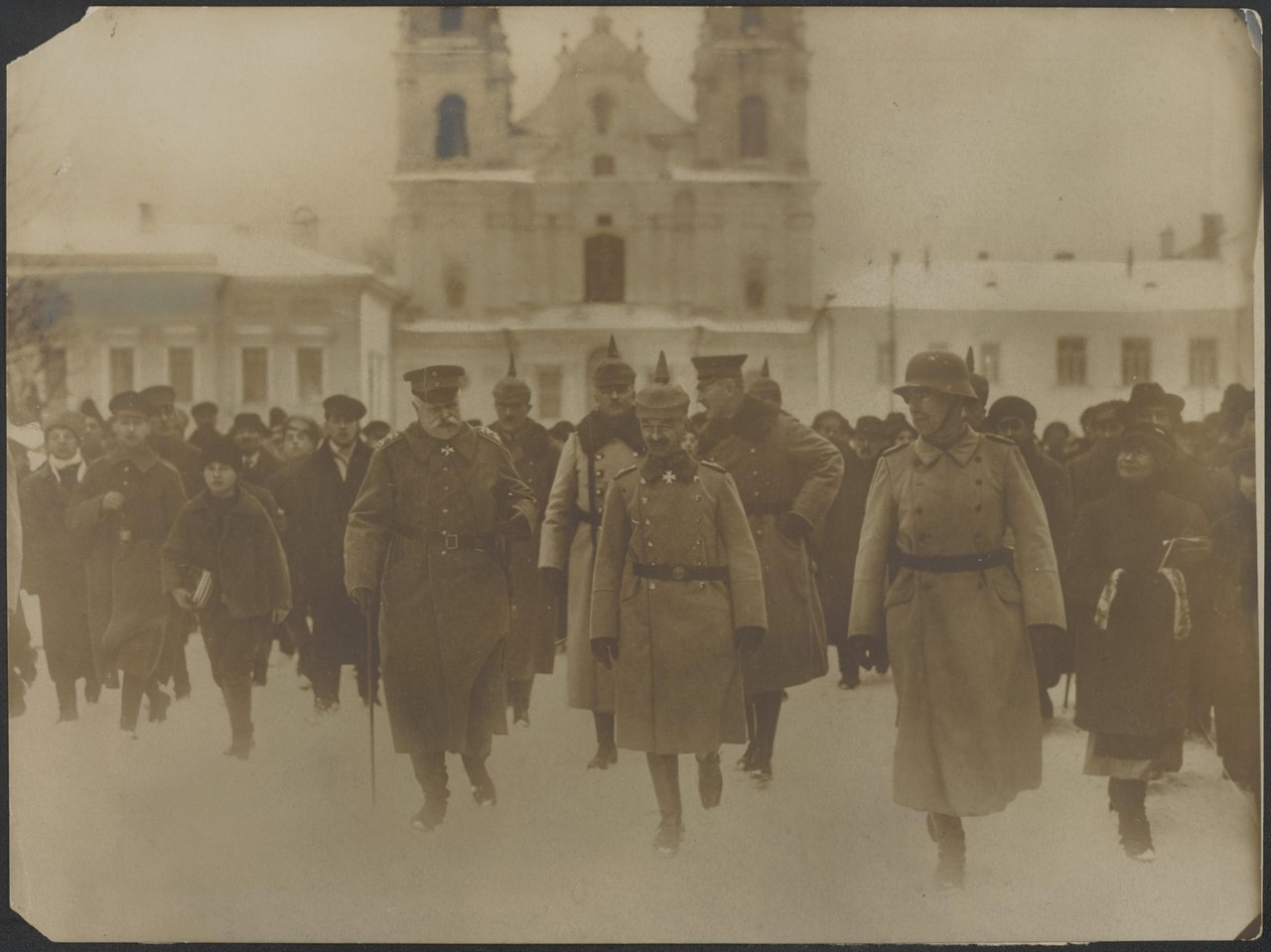
Field Marshal Hermann von Eichhorn (left) and General Ferdinand von Bredow (right) visit Minsk , recently occupied by German troops. Photo 1918 — near the Cathedral of the Blessed Virgin Mary.

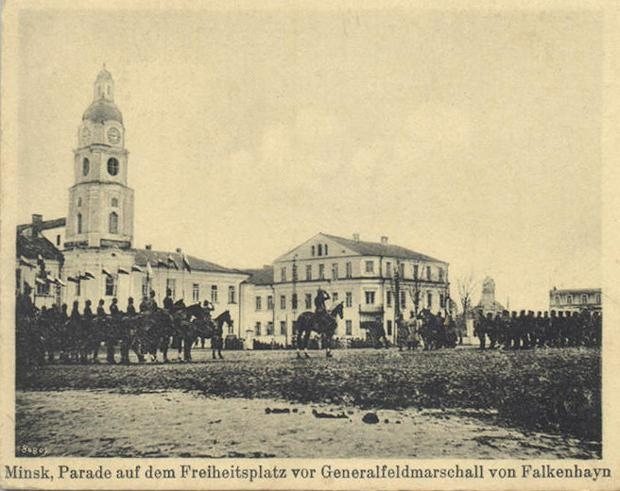
Parade of German troops in Minsk on Liberty Square — received by Field Marshal Erich von Falkenhayn. Photo 1918.

As follows from the memoirs of Edward Woyniłłowicz, after German troops began leaving the territory of the Mogilev Governorate in late October/early November 1918 according to the decisions of the Treaty of Brest-Litovsk with the Bolsheviks (3 March 1918), leaders of the indigenous nobility of the Minsk Governorate in Minsk (primarily members of the Minsk Society of Agriculture) spoke out against the division of Belarus. They launched an initiative to create a "Grand Duchy of Lithuania-Belarus" (comprising the northwestern governorates) under German curatorship. According to Woyniłłowicz, the youngest member of that delegation was Zygmunt Rewieński.

Initially, Edward Woyniłłowicz was offered the leadership of the delegation of Minsk nobles to the German General Erich von Falkenhayn (1861–1922), commander of the 10th German Army, as the most respected and influential leader of the indigenous Minsk nobles (a fact the German authorities also knew). However, he refused because he held anti-German political views and did not consider it dignified to create a state under German curatorship. Nevertheless, Woyniłłowicz ultimately signed the appeal (the document would not have carried much weight without it), although he did not sign first, and he was present in the delegation (which also included individual Russian landowners of the Minsk Governorate) to General von Falkenhayn. In Minsk, the delegates (30 persons), led by the newly elected Marshal of the Nobility of the Minsk Governorate, Count Jerzy Hutten-Czapski, asked General von Falkenhayn to inform the German Emperor Wilhelm II of their aspiration. Essentially, this was the last attempt by the conservative Krajowcy to unite the Lithuanian-Belarusian lands administratively and territorially, not as an autonomy within Russia or Poland, but as an independent state. General von Falkenhayn replied to the delegation of Minsk nobles that he must strictly observe the decisions of the Treaty of Brest-Litovsk, but would pass the proposal to the Imperial Headquarters.

On 24 October 1918, Raman Skirmunt went to Berlin with a mission from the Minsk conservative nobles, leading a delegation of local nobles (Prince Antoni Albrecht Wilhelm Radziwiłł, Stanisław Chrzanowski, Count Jerzy Czapski, Aleksander Lubański) and a representative of merchants and entrepreneurs (Gregor Kaplan), but they failed to obtain an audience with the German Emperor Wilhelm II. The German Revolution began in Berlin, abolishing the monarchy and establishing a republic. In February 1919, the Germans quickly left the entire territory of Belarus and were replaced by Bolshevik troops—the Red Army.

Naming the new state the "Grand Duchy of Lithuania-Belarus" (rather than, for example, the "Kingdom of Lithuania and Belarus") directly appealed to the historical tradition of the medieval Grand Duchy of Lithuania (GDL) and sought to emphasise continuity with it, although they did introduce the novelty of naming the new state not the "Grand Duchy of Lithuania", but the "Grand Duchy of Lithuania-Belarus". The Krajowcy appealed to both the state traditions of the GDL and their genealogical and cultural roots in that state.

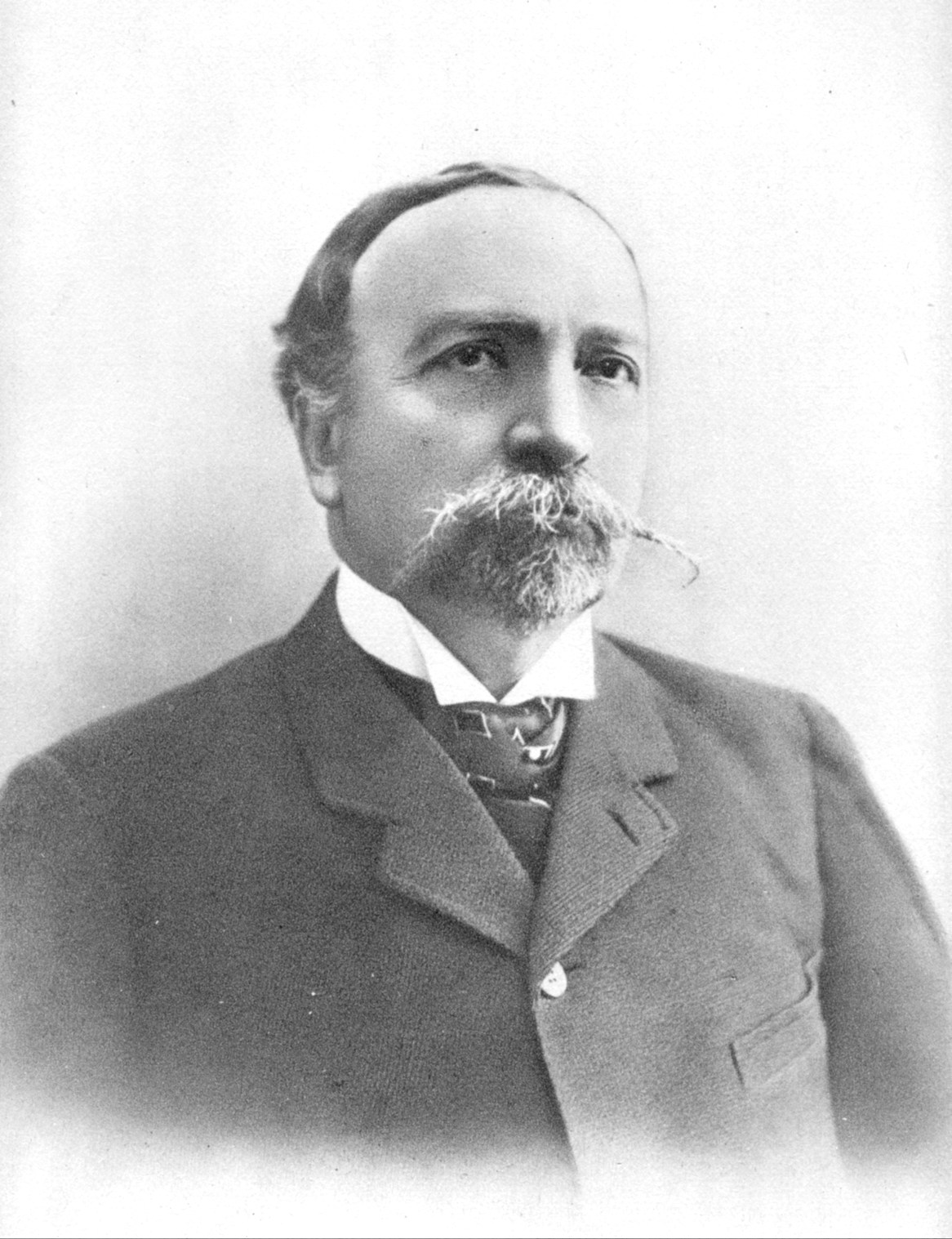
Edward Woyniłłowicz (1847–1928)

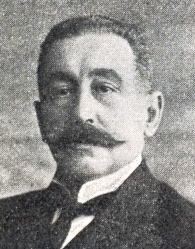
Count Jerzy Hutten-Czapski (1861–1930)

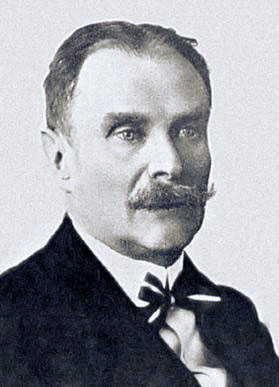
Karol Niezabytowski (1865–1952)

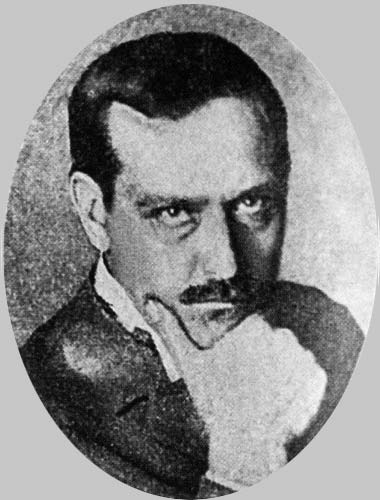
Raman Skirmunt (1868–1939)

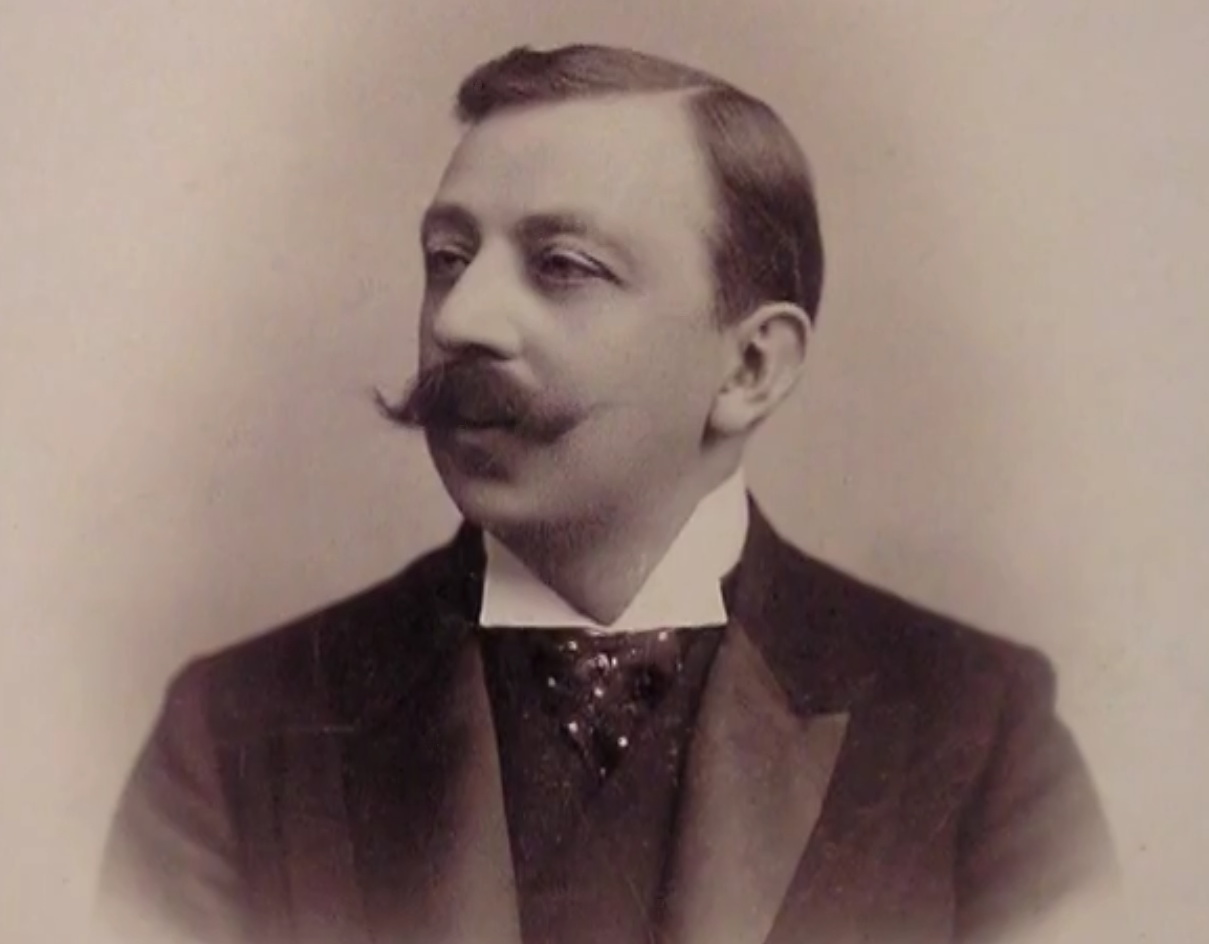
Aleksander Lubański (1863–1932)

The project to create the GDLB is not well studied by historians. However, there is indirect information that the Minsk initiators of the political project likely had certain connections and coordination with conservative Catholic and Polish-speaking nobles in Vilnius and the Vilnius region (held by the Council of Lithuania), as well as representatives in Berlin, in particular with Prince Maciej Mikołaj Radziwiłł (1873–1920), Count Alfred Tyszkiewicz (1882–1930), Count Jan Michał Tyszkiewicz (1896–1939), and others who disliked the policy of the Council of Lithuania. Furthermore, the project of the GDLB was essentially analogous to projects for the emergence of monarchical limitrophe states under German curatorship on the lands of Poland, Estonia, Latvia, Lithuania, Ukraine, and Finland in the same period, when the German economy could no longer sustain military expenditures, threatening the German position on the Eastern Front at the end of World War I.

== Search for new forms of political subjectivity ==
The attempt to create the GDLB is one of the episodes in the struggle of the Woyniłłowicz-led local conservative nobles to realise the idea of the political subjectivity of the Belarusian-Lithuanian lands (or Belarus alone) and to break their provincialization in the international arena between 1917 and 1921. After the failure to create the GDLB, many Catholic and Polish-speaking conservative nobles (including many members of the MAS) supported the idea of the incorporation of the Lithuanian-Belarusian lands as a subject of the federation into the multinational federal Second Polish Republic being restored by Józef Piłsudski in 1919–1920, and took part in financing the Lithuanian–Belarusian Division.

The idea of transforming interwar Poland (1918–1939) into a constitutional-monarchist and federal state (comprising subjects such as Poland, Belarus, and Lithuania) would be supported by the "Vilnius conservatives" (Żubry kresowe), who became, to some extent, the successors of the liberal-conservative Krajowcy trend.

== See also ==
- Kingdom of Poland (1917–1918)
- Kingdom of Lithuania (1918)
- United Baltic Duchy
- Kingdom of Finland (1918)
- Wilhelm Franz von Habsburg-Lothringen
- General Confederation of the Kingdom of Poland (1812)

== Bibliography ==
=== Belarusian-language sources ===
- Гамулка, К. (2008). Паміж Польшчай і Расіяй. Беларусь у канцэпцыях польскіх палітычных фарміраванняў (1918—1922) [Between Poland and Russia. Belarus in the Concepts of Polish Political Formations (1918—1922)] (in Belarusian). Вільня. p. 256.
- Вабішчэвіч А. [і інш.]; рэдкал. М. Касцюк (гал. рэд.) і інш., ed. (2007). Гісторыя Беларусі : у 6 т. Т. 5. Беларусь у 1917—1945 гг [History of Belarus: In 6 Vol. Vol. 5. Belarus in 1917—1945] (in Belarusian). Мінск: Экаперспектыва. p. 613.
- Дзярновіч, А. (2012). Пошукі Айчыны: «Літва» і «Русь» у сучаснай беларускай гістарыяграфіі [Search for the Fatherland: "Lithuania" and "Rus" in Modern Belarusian Historiography]. Палітычная сфера (in Belarusian) (18–19 (1–2)): 30–53. Archived from the original (PDF) on 2022-09-21.
- Казакевіч, А. (2003). Вялікае Княства Літоўскае як ідэалагічная рэальнасць [The Grand Duchy of Lithuania as an Ideological Reality]. Arche (in Belarusian) (5): 43–60. Archived from the original on 2012-04-16.
- Купала, Янка (2002). Поўны збор твораў: у 9 т. Т. 8. Артыкулы, нататкі, выступленні. Калектыўныя творы [Complete Works: In 9 Vol. Vol. 8. Articles, Notes, Speeches. Collective Works] (in Belarusian). Мінск: Мастацкая літаратура. p. 462.
- Ладысеў, У. Ф.; Брыгадзін, П. І. (1999). На пераломе эпох: станаўленне беларускай дзяржаўнасці (1917—1920 гг.) [At the Turn of Epochs: The Formation of Belarusian Statehood (1917—1920)] (in Belarusian). Мінск: БДУ. p. 128.
- Раюк, А. Р. (2020). Беларускі палітычны кансерватызм канца XIX – пачатку XX ст. [Belarusian Political Conservatism of the Late 19th – Early 20th Century] (PDF). Научные труды Респ. ин-та высш. школы. Истор. и псих.-пед. науки (in Belarusian) (20 (2)). Мінск: РИВШ: 178–184. Archived from the original (PDF) on 2022-03-03.
- Раюк, А. Р. (2020). Статус Беларусі ў свядомасці мясцовых каталіцкіх дваран-кансерватараў канца XIX — пачатку XX ст. [The Status of Belarus in the Consciousness of Local Catholic Conservative Nobles of the Late 19th – Early 20th Century]. In А. І. Лакотка (ed.). Пытанні мастацтвазнаўства, этналогіі і фалькларыстыкі. Вып. 27 [Questions of Art History, Ethnology and Folklore. Issue 27] (PDF) (in Belarusian). Мінск: Права і эканоміка. pp. 337–342.
- Цвикевич, А. (1919). Беларусь: политический очерк (перевод с белорусского) [Belarus: Political Essay (translation from Belarusian)] (in Russian). Берлин: Издание Чрезвычайной дипломатической миссии БНР. p. 33.
- Шыбека, З. (2003). Нарыс гісторыі Беларусі (1795—2002) [Outline of the History of Belarus (1795—2002)] (in Belarusian). Мінск: Энцыклапедыкс. p. 490.

=== Polish-language sources ===
- Brzoza, Cz.; Stepan, K. (1998). "Skirmunt Roman". Polski Słownik Biograficzny (in Polish). Vol. XXXVIII/2. Warszawa etc.: Ossolineum. pp. 184–187.
- Gierowska-Kałłaur, J. (2003). Zarząd cywilny Ziem Wschodnich (19 lutego 1919 — 9 września 1920) (in Polish). Warszawa: Neriton. p. 455.
- Jurkowski, R. (2007). "Rada Polska Ziemi Mińskiej wobec I Korpusu polskiego gen. J. Dowbór-Muśnickiego". Znakamityia minchane: Materyialy Belaruska-polskai navuk. kanf., Minsk, 9 list. 2006 h. (in Polish). Мінск: Polski In-t u Minsku. pp. 65–81.
- Łatyszonek, O. (1995). Białoruskie formacje wojskowe 1917—1923 (PDF) (in Polish). Białystok: Białoruskie Towarzystwo Historyczne. p. 273. Archived from the original (PDF) on 2020-09-27.
- Smaliańczuk, A. (2005). "Białorusini w gronie krajowców". In Tadeusz Bujnicki i Krzysztof Stępnik (ed.). Ostatni obywatele Wielkiego Księstwa Litewskiego (in Polish). Lublin: Wyd. Uniwersytetu Marii Curie-Składowskiej.
- Szpoper, D. (2009). Gente Lithuana, Natione Lithuana. Myśl polityczna i działalność Konstancji Skirmuntt (1851—1934) (in Polish). Gdańsk: Arche. p. 487.
- Szpoper, D. (1999). Sukcesorzy Wielkiego Księstwa. Myśl polityczna i działalność konserwatystów polskich na ziemiach litewsko-białoruskich w latach 1904—1939 (in Polish). Gdańsk: Arche. p. 357.
- Woyniłłowicz, E. (1931). Wspomnienia. 1847—1928 (in Polish). Vol. 1. Wilno: Józef Zawadzki. p. 368.
