= Zachar =

Zachar is both a given name and a surname of Jewish origin. Notable people with the name include:

- Zachar Šybieka (born 1948), Belarusian historian
- Imre Zachár (1890–1954), Hungarian water polo player
- Jacob Zachar (born 1986), American actor
- Ján Zachar (born 1936), Slovak football coach
- Karol Zachar (1918–2003), Slovak director

== See also ==
- Zachara, surname
