= Regional Party of Lithuania and White Ruthenia =

Defunct political parties in Belarus

The Regional Party of Lithuania and White Ruthenia was a political party of major Polish-speaking (mostly of Belarusian origin) nobility and landlords (so called krajowcy) living on the lands of the former Grand Duchy of Lithuania (what is now Republic of Lithuania and Belarus) in early 20th century.

The initiator of creation of the party was Raman Skirmunt (he called himself "Belarusian"). In November 1905 he published a manifest of the Regional party of Lithuania and Ruthenia that in fact was a party program which demanded introduction of democratic freedoms and especially the freedom of national life and equality of nationalities as well as regional autonomy for the former Grand Duchy of Lithuania and protection of private property. In early 1906 Skirmunt published the manifest once again, having adjusted the name of the party to Regional party of White Ruthenia and Lithuania.

On June 17 in Vilnius which decided to establish the Regional party of Lithuania and Belarus and approved its programme (it was signed by 23 delegates out of 30). The programme called for regional autonomy, equality of all nations, introduction of education native languages, and considered alienation of estates as unacceptable. Eduard Vaynilovich (he called himself "Belarusian") was elected chairman of the party.

The party had its newspaper called Glos Polski ("Polish voice", 1907). Representatives of the Kaunas province and Skirmunt did not join the party because of its being too Poland-oriented and ignoring the interests of Lithuanian minority and Belarusians.

The party dissolved in 1908 and came back to life for a short time during World War I. With the revival of Poland as an independent state the krajowcy movement disappeared completely.

== Sources ==
- Смалянчук, А. Ф. Паміж краёвасцю і нацыянальнай ідэяй. Польскі рух на беларускіх і літоўскіх землях. 1864 — люты 1917 г. / А. Ф. Смалянчук. — СПб. : Неўскі прасцяг, 2004. — 406 с
