= Mieczysław Jałowiecki =

Polish agronomist and diplomat (1876–1962)

Mieczysław Perejasławski-Jałowiecki
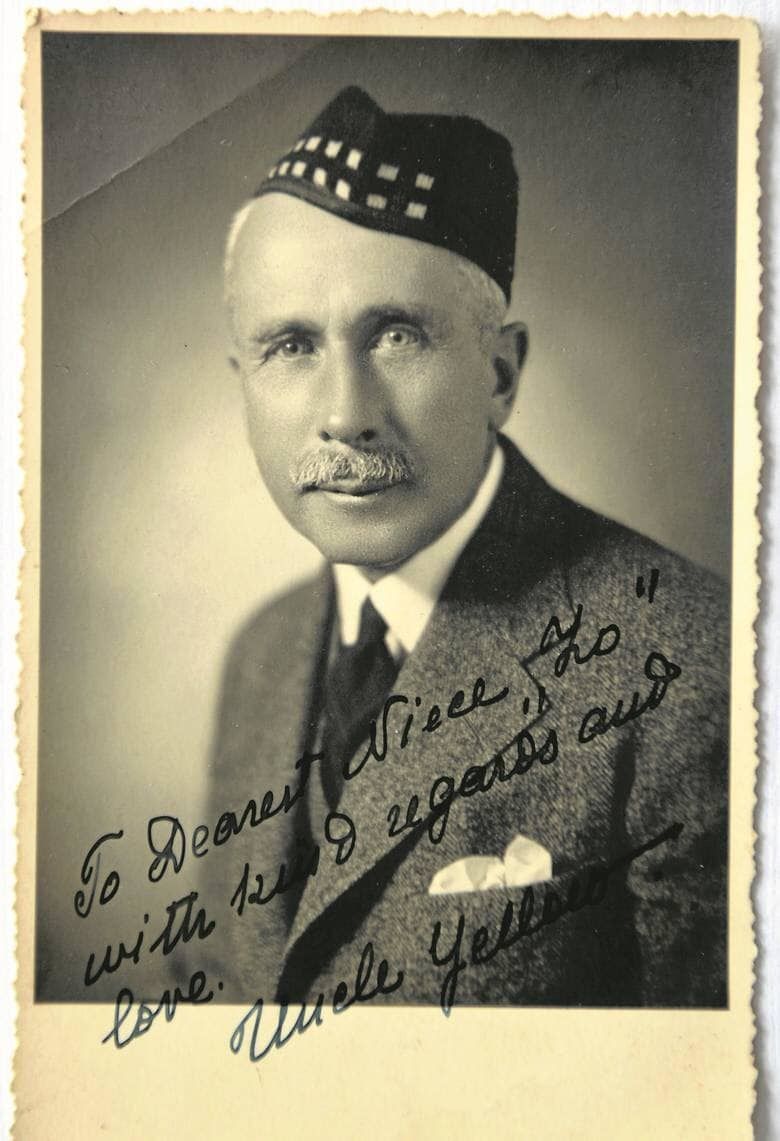
- Born: 2 December 1876; Saldutiškis, Russian Empire
- Died: 10 March 1962; Beckenham, United Kingdom

Mieczysław Perejasławski-Jałowiecki (2 December 1876 – 1962 ) (Note: Machaliński states that he died in 1962, as does Maria Minakowska in her genealology database, but other sources give the year 1963. Similarly, sources disagree on his place of birth. Machaliński and Minakowska both give Saldutiškis, but Kulas names Rostov-on-Don, and Rostov is mentioned as his place of birth in his biographical sketch in his diaries.) was a Polish diplomat, agronomist, writer and nobleman.

== Early life and education ==
Mieczysław was born in his family manor in Saldutiškis (then in the Russian Empire, now in Lithuania). His mother, Aniela, was a sister of Stanisław Witkiewicz; she was also a relative of the Piłsudski family. His father, general Bolesław Jałowiecki, was an engineer, the grandson of an Imperial Russian Army general who sided with the Polish-Lithuanian 1830–31 insurgents during the November Uprising and was sentenced to death, but pardoned.

He graduated from the Riga Technical University, studying agronomics and chemistry, finishing agronomics studies. He also served in the Russian army, and continued studies at the University of Bonn. Before World War I he worked for the Russian government (Ministry of Agriculture) as the agricultural consul in Germany, was a director or a board member of several organizations and presided over the sejmik of local nobility (szlachta). He worked at the Vilnius Land Bank. His agricultural possessions (in Saldutiškis and Otulany) were seen as a model by many in Lithuania, he was frequently visited by other landowners interested in his methods; he also gave talks and presentations on the agronomic subjects.

== World War I and post-war ==
During World War I, he served in the civilian arm of the Russian Army, reaching the rank of colonel. After the war he found that his estates had been taken over by the German administration, whose representatives refused to turn them over to him. At the same time, he was worried by the worsening relations between Poles and Lithuanians. He was a vocal representative of the many among the local Polonized nobility who wanted to reach a compromise solution with the Lithuanians (the krajowcy); he was involved in direct negotiations with the Lithuanian president Antanas Smetona. Machaliński, in his biographical sketch of Jałowiecki, writes that he was "shocked by the growing hostility of Lithuanians towards the Poles". Jałowiecki himself, after the failure of his attempt to reach a compromise with the Lithuanian authorities, wrote: "For me and many of my compatriotes... who were raised in the spirit of love for Lithuania, Lithuanian people... this new direction was totally incomprehensible." As the tensions between Poles and Lithuanians grew, he became involved in the organization of self-defense forces, and was one of the members of the delegation from the Vilnius Region to Józef Piłsudski in Warsaw, requesting his aid (that would eventually take the form of the Vilna offensive).

In Warsaw, he began working for the government of Second Polish Republic, employed as a diplomat for the Polish Ministry of Foreign Affairs; he was the Polish government's delegate to Gdańsk (Danzig) in the years 1919–1920. In Gdańsk he was involved with Herbert Hoover's American Relief Administration. Afterwards, unable to return to his Lithuanian homeland, he bought a new estate in Kamień, near Kalisz. Saldutiškis, looted during the war, was converted by the Lithuanian state into administrative offices and a primary school while the former barn was converted into a parish church.

== Later life ==
After German invasion of Poland he left for the United Kingdom, where he was a politician and social activist in the Polish government in exile. He stayed in the UK after the war. Till his death he was involved in the activities of the British Polonia, publishing books and brochures about agronomics and about his homeland. In 1962 he died near London.

Mieczysław was also a writer and has published several books in the Polish language about his diplomatic career and on agronomic subjects. He also wrote a diary trilogy, describing his life in Na skraju imperium, Wolne Miasto and Requiem dla ziemiaństwa.
