= Zachara =

Zachara is a surname of Slavic origin. Notable people with the surname include:

- Franciszek Zachara (1898–1966), Polish pianist and composer
- Ján Zachara (1928–2025), Slovak boxer
- Mateusz Zachara (born 1990), Polish footballer

== See also ==
- Zachar, given name and surname
