= Saldutiškis =

- Town
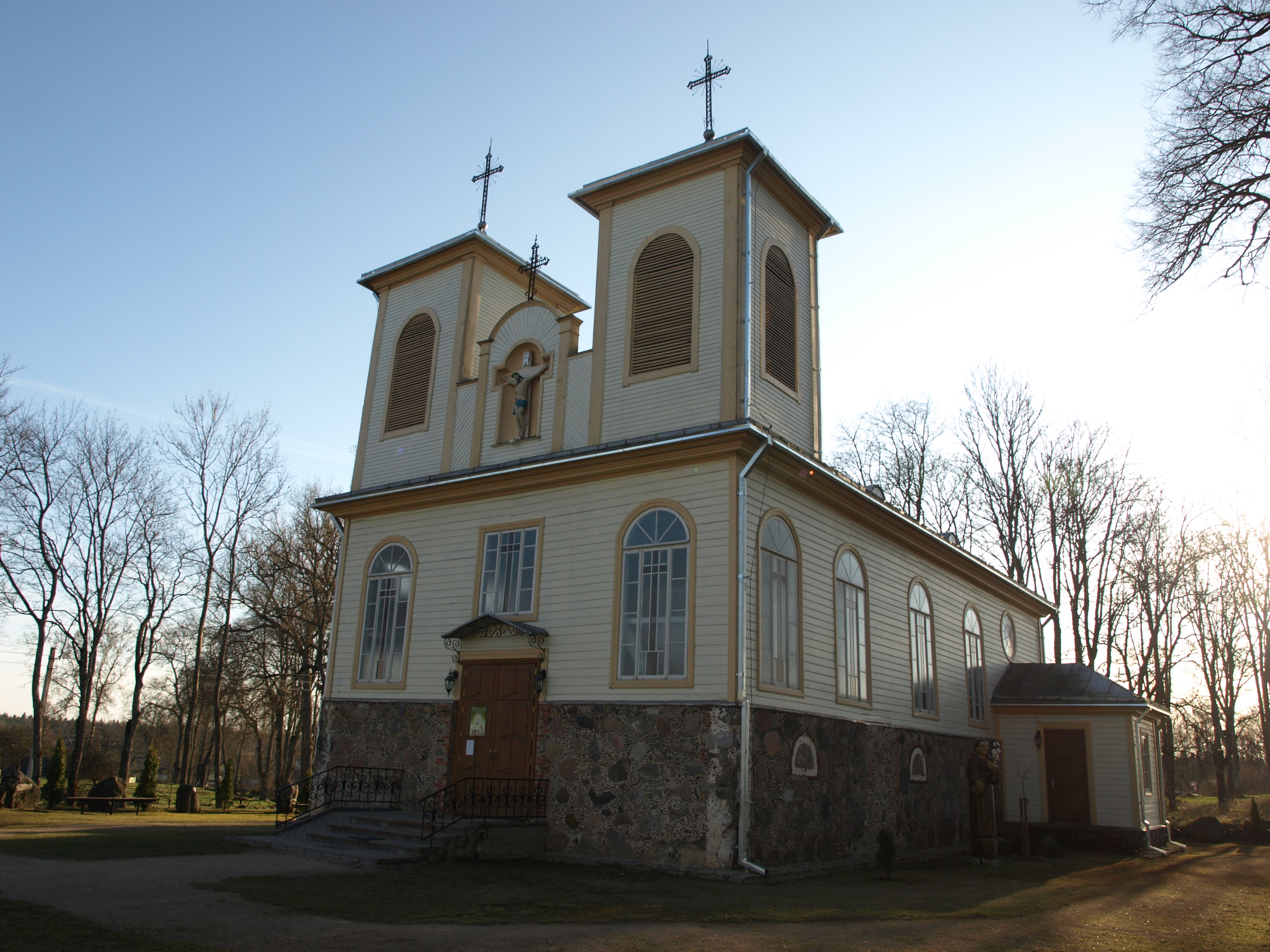
- The church of Saldutiškis

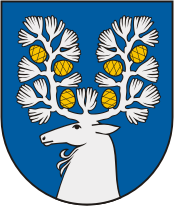
- Coat of arms

- Location in Lithuania
- Coordinates: 55°21′10″N 25°48′50″E
- Country: Lithuania
- County: Utena County
- Municipality: Utena district municipality
- Eldership: Saldutiškis eldership
- Capital of: Saldutiškis eldership

Population (2021)
  - Total: 261
- Time zone: UTC+2 (EET)
  - Summer (DST): UTC+3 (EEST)

Saldutiškis is a small town in northeastern Lithuania. According to the Lithuanian census of 2021, it had 261 residents.

Its alternate names include Syłgudyszki (Polish language), Saldutishkis, Trunkuny, and Saldatiškio.

== History ==
The village was first mentioned in the late 18th century, when the property and manor of the Jaloveckis (Jałowiecki) family were recorded. Two of its most famous members were General Boleslovas Jaloveckis (August 10, 1846 – July 10, 1918) and his son Mieczysław (December 2, 1876 – March 10, 1962), a diplomat for the interwar Polish government of the Second Polish Republic and a known agronomist. Bolesław established a park, rich in tree variety. The settlement began to grow after a narrow gauge railway between Panevėžys and Švenčionėliai was built in 1899. Its train station was built in the traditional Zakopane Style of Architecture. The Panevėžys-Saldutiškis railway was the object of the 1938–1939 Panevėžys-Saldutiškis Railway Case of the Permanent Court of International Justice between Estonia and Lithuania.

During World War I, the manor was abandoned and looted. In the aftermath of World War I, the village became part of the independent Lithuanian state. In the independent Lithuania, Jałowiecki family was unable to regain their estates, and Mieczysław settled in Poland. In the 1920s the former Jałowiecki's manor was converted into administrative offices and a primary school while the former barn was converted into a parish church. According to the 1923 census, there were 79 residents in Saldutiškis. As the settlement grew, an agricultural school and foresters office was moved into the town. A sawmill provided electricity for the town and surrounding settlements.

On July 3 and August 4, 1941, German Einsatzgruppen and Lithuanian collaborators executed the Jews from Saldutiškis. The remaining Jews from the city were shot at the military training grounds in Švenčionėliai.

After World War II, several collective farms (kolkhozy) were established and primary school was converted into secondary. Saldutiškis had 309 residents in 1957, 388 in 1970, and 434 in 1979.

On July 30, 2002, the President of Lithuania confirmed the coat of arms of the town. The arms depict a silver deer with two pine branches with golden cones instead of antlers. These are symbols of the nearby Labanoras Forest, the largest forest in Lithuania.
