= Raman Skirmunt =

Belarusian-Polish aristocrat and politician

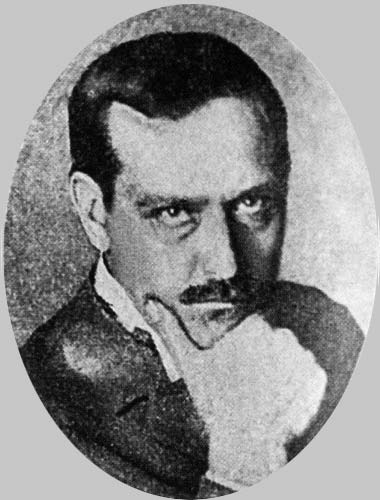

Chairmen of the People's Secretariat of the Belarusian Democratic Republic
- In office June 1918 – August 1918 Serving with Jan Sierada
- Preceded by: Jazep Varonka
- Succeeded by: Anton Luckievich

Personal details
- Born: 7 May 1868 Parechcha, Pinsky Uyezd, Minsk Governorate, Russian Empire (now Pinsk District, Belarus)
- Died: 7 October 1939 near Pinsk

Raman (Roman) Alyaksandravich Skirmunt (Belarusian: Рама́н Алякса́ндравіч Скі́рмунт; Russian: Рома́н Алекса́ндрович Ски́рмунт 7 May 1868 – 7 October 1939) was a Belarusian and Polesian statesman, aristocrat and landlord. Patron, significant landowner, vice-chairman (1907–1917, 1918–?) of the Minsk Agricultural Society. Deputy (1906) of the First State Duma of the Russian Empire; deputy (1910–1911) of the State Council of the Russian Empire from the Minsk province; (nominal) Prime Minister of the BNR (1918) — was not approved for the post of Prime Minister; senator of Poland (1930–1935). His cousin Konstanty Skirmunt was a notable Polish diplomat and minister of foreign affairs.

== Early years ==
Raman Skirmunt was born in the village Parechcha in the Pinsky Uyezd of the Minsk Governorate (present-day Pinsk District of Belarus) in the family of Alexander Alexandrovich-Izidorovich Skirmunt (1830—1909), the representative of into the local noble family of the Catholic Lithuanian noble family of the Skirmunts. Raman Skyrmunt wrote about his origins:

"I myself am a native of the Belarusian Polesia, a descendant of a Lithuanian family that has lived in this region since ancient times, since centuries, and my ancestors date back to the 17th century and used the Belarusian language as their mother tongue".

His father was the son of Alexander Aliaksandrawicz Skirmunt (1830–1909), a prominent landowner of Pinsk District, and his mother was the daughter of Zyanon Janovich Lubanski (about 1807–1854), Viley District Marshall (1835 —1841, 1844—1847), from his wife Marta Lyavkovich.

He was the seventh child in the family, Teofila (1857) and Alexander (1858) were born in Albrechtov, and Branislava (1864), Yusuf (1862), Wanda (1866) and Vaclav (1867) were born in Parechcha. Alena (1869), Felicia (1873) and Zenon (1874) were born during Raman's lifetime, but Vaclav died tragically in 1872. On 30 April Raman was baptized in the Pinsk parish church by priest Vikentius Swidersky, the godparents were the landowner Kazimir Tvardovsky and his sister Maria Skirmunt from Tvardowski, the wife of Henrik Skirmunt from Moladov, the uncle of the newborn.

== Education ==
Skirmunt received only home and primary education. He graduated from three classes of the Riga City Gymnasium, but did not receive a diploma of secondary education, because according to the will of Alexander's parents, he was taken away from the gymnasium at age 15. He took over the responsibilities of managing the estate in order to provide financially for the whole family in the future.

== Political and economic activity ==
In early 20th century Skirmunt was among the leaders of the local krajowcy movement and advocated the creation of the Krajowcy Party of Lithuania and White Ruthenia as a common Polish-Belarusian-Lithuanian political organization.

Skirmunt was a member of the Minsk Agricultural Society (MTSG), and in 1904 he was elected a member of the Council of this society. He became a faithful friend, associate and, according to Count Ippolit Korvin-Milewski, "favorite student" of Edward Vainilovich in terms of economic work in the Moscow State University of Technology and political activity. In 1905–1911 he was the chairman of the Department for Agriculture Affairs and Needs of Minsky Polessie (Poleski Society of Agriculture), which was a department of the Minsk Society of Agriculture. He was the vice-chairman (1907–1917, 1918–?) of the Minsk Society of Agriculture and one of its leaders.

In 1906, under the patronage of Edward Vainilovich, Skirmunt was elected a deputy from Minsk province of the First Russian State Duma. In the official Duma questionnaire, Skirmunt registered himself as "Polish". The newspaper "Nowy Kurier Litewski" (No. 104, 1917) reported that in 1906, in one of the backroom conversations in the State Duma, Skirmunt once called himself a "Belarusian". On 25 March 1907 Raman Skirmunt became a member of the Supervisory Board of the Polish Society "Enlightenment" in Minsk.

Skirmunt helped found a Polish-Belarusian fraction, the so-called Western Borderlands Group (Russian: Группа западных окраин), which united with deputies from Polish provinces (the so-called "Polish circle from the Kingdom of Poland") and formed the core of the parliamentary group "Union of Autonomists". Skirmunt called for the creation of a regional party, the "Regional Party of Belarus and Lithuania". He envisioned the "regional party" project as an international bloc of Polish, Belarusian and Lithuanian political organizations.

Skirmunt, like other members of the Western Borderlands Group, spoke in defense of the right of private ownership of land and against the alienation of a part of privately owned lands: he stated that the creation (as proposed by the Russian Cadets) of a state fund of land would not solve the issue of increasing (or strengthening) peasant land ownership, because the fund would only offer peasants the use of land, not ownership, and in the Western region, where peasant land ownership prevailed, it would cause only misunderstanding and horror. He advocated instead the sale of the state land fund to peasants.

On 17 June 1907 a congress of landowners of six Belarusian–Lithuanian provinces took place in Vilnius to create the "National Party of Lithuania and Belarus", which had been announced long ago in the press. However, Skirmunt himself did not join the party, as he was unhappy with the fact that the "regional party" emerged as exclusively "Polish", and Skirmunt sought to create a party that would have three factions – Polish, Lithuanian and Belarusian. As a result, the Regional Party of Lithuania and Belarus was headed by the main leader of conservative regionalists, Edward Vainilovich.

From October 1910 to January 1911, Skirmunt was a senator-deputy of the State Council of the Russian Empire, where he was elected for a three-year term from the Minsk province under the patronage of Edward Vainilovich. In the official questionnaire, Skirmunt indicated that he had graduated from a gymnasium in Riga. However, because he could not document his claim that he received a gymnasium education and because it was necessary to have at least a high school education to qualify as a deputy of the State Council of the Russian Empire, Skirmunt was forced to leave the State Council in January 1911, to be replaced by Karol Nezabytovsky.

In 1911 he returned to Belarus and worked as leader of the local zemstvo of Minsk; he was also a member of the board of the Vilnius Land Bank. In 1914 he was a member of the Minsk Provincial Committee of the All-Russian Zemstvo Union.

== War, revolution and independence efforts ==
In January 1917, he headed the Minsk branch of the Belarusian Society for Aid to War Victims, which served to provide a cover for political groups banned by the German occupation forces. He was also the head of the Minsk Provincial Food Committee.

From 27 March to 10 July 1917 he was the chairman of the Belarusian National Committee in Minsk. In April 1917, he headed the Belarusian delegation to the Russian Provisional Government, which controlled the central and eastern territories of Belarus together with Minsk, demanding the autonomy of Belarus.

When, in connection with the elections to the Constituent Assembly of Russia, the Main Polish Election Committee of the Minsk District was established in Minsk on 8 October 1917, Skirmunt became a member of this committee. He took part in the elections of deputies from the Minsk province to the Constituent Assembly of Russia in Minsk as the first candidate from the list "Bloc of landowners" of the Minsk province (list No. 3 – which included Belarusian, Polish and Russian landowners), but lost.

After the October Revolution Skirmunt took part in the Belarusian Congress of District Councils of the Minsk Province, where he was among the initiators of the resolution of the Great Belarusian Council regarding the conclusion of peace between Russia and Germany and the unification of all Belarusian lands under Russian rule. He participated in the First All-Belarusian Congress, which was held on 7–18 December 1917 in Minsk, and was elected to the council of the congress, as an unofficial representative of local Polish and Belarusian interests.

During the German occupation of Minsk in February 1918, he headed the "Minsk Belarusian Representation". In April 1918 Skirmunt became a member of the Council of the newly proclaimed Belarusian Democratic Republic; in July he became Prime Minister of Belarus and secretary for foreign affairs. On 21 July 1918 he resigned from the post of Prime Minister. In November 1918 he led the Belarusian diplomatic delegation in Germany and Switzerland seeking international recognition of Belarus.

In November 1918, as part of an extraordinary Belarusian delegation, he was in Germany and Switzerland for the purpose of recognizing the independence of Belarus. He was one of the founders of the Polish–Belarusian Society in Warsaw (1919). Like Edward Vainilovich, he advocated the creation of a Polish–Belarusian federation. During the Polish-Soviet War he tried to prevent the division of Belarus between the opposing sides.

== In interwar Poland (1921-1939) ==
After the Polish-Soviet War and the division of Belarus according to the Riga Peace Treaty, he accepted Polish citizenship, while advocating autonomy for West Belarus within the Second Polish Republic, but was no longer politically active, mostly concentrating on his life in his manor. In 1923–1928 he held the elected position of judge of the Pinsk District Court. In 1923–1927 he was also the chairman of the Poleski District Society of Agriculture (Pinsk).

He took an active part in the social and cultural life of the Poleski Voivodeship. He devoted himself to literary studies and was engaged in the local history of Polesia, taking part in the creation of the Polesia Museum in Pinsk and supporting the idea of inter-ethnic and inter-religious tolerance in the region.

Only after the "May Coup" in 1926 did he regain interest in politics at the national level. In 1929 Skirmunt became a member of the Council of the Conservative Organization of State Work – a public association of the political group "Vilnius Conservatives", and in 1930 was elected senator (1930–1935) from the Pola Voivodeship, joining the Nonpartisan Bloc for Cooperation with the Government, which supported the policies of József Piłsudski. Skirmunt opposed the Polishization of the Belarusian population.

Vilnius conservatives (Prince Eustachy Sapieha and Stanislav Matskevich (1896–1966)) also took an active part in drafting the new constitution of the Second Polish-Lithuanian Commonwealth, adopted on 23 April 1935. On 28 August 1933, in Vilnius, in the building of the Vilnius Land Bank, a meeting convened by the Conservative Organization of State Work was held, at which Prince Sapieha, who wrote the treatise "Constitution of State Interests" (Konstytucja racji stanu"), read a report on the legal solutions proposed in the new constitution. The meeting was chaired and managed by Senator Skirmunt.

== Death and burial ==
After the signing of the Molotov–Ribbentrop Pact Nazi Germany and the Soviet Union absorbed formerly Polish territory. In September 1939 the local population of Pinshchyna, which supported the Soviets, made a fatal mistake: they ran out to meet a train full of Polish soldiers with red banners. Skyrmunt fell on his knees in front of the latter so that they would not punish the peasants.

Having learned of the attack by the USSR, Skirmunt, his sister Elena, and her husband Bolyaslav Skirmunt left Parechcha for Pinsk. On the evening of 20 September 1939 units of the Red Army entered the city. In the following days, mass arrests of "class alien elements" took place. The Skirmunts were also arrested, but they stayed in prison only for a day. After interrogation and recording of personal data, they, like most other detainees, were released. Towards the end of September, Raman and Boleslav Skirmunty decided to return to Parechcha.

As Father Mikalai (Matsukevich) mentions, during the September turmoil after the occupation of Western Belarus by Soviet troops in 1939, Skirmunt hid with his friend, the peasant Roman Baranchuk, in the village of Parechcha. But on the morning of October 6, the Skirmunts were arrested by armed "committee officers" and placed in the prison of the former commune administration, which became the seat of the committee. The next morning, the arrested were put on a cart and told that they would be taken to Pinsk for questioning. But first, the general meeting of the villagers was supposed to become a "people's court" over the landlord. Maria Nikolaychyk (born in 1920) said that people were crying, and Skirmunt said: "I say goodbye to you forever. I hope I didn't hurt anyone".

Skirmunt was killed by local residents on the orders of the Soviet commissar Kholadov. The chairman of the village council ordered to take him and his brother-in-law Boleslav Skirmunt to Pinsk. Before reaching the city, in the forest, they were stopped, given shovels and ordered to dig their own graves. Skirmunt, who was 71 at the time, leaned against a tree and said, "I don't deserve to dig my own grave." It was said that before his death, Raman Skyrmunt was ordered to turn away from the killers. He refused: "I never turned my back on people." After shooting both of them, they threw them into a pit, without finishing them off.

According to historian I. K. Kiryanov Raman Skirmunt was killed by the NKVD. In order to calm the people, several people who took part in the murder of Skirmunt were arrested and taken to Siberia by the NKVD. In the spring of 1940, shepherds who grazed cows in the Koran Forest found the body of Skirmunt and informed the authorities about the find. As Skirmunt's body was carried through the village of Parechcha, the peasants poured out into the street to pay their last respects to their lord. NKVDists, on horseback, escorted the body and secretly buried him in his native estate of Parechcha.

== Estates and property ==
In 1876, Raman Skirmunt's father, Alexander Skirmunt, owned the Porechcha estate in the Pinsk District of the Minsk Province, where there were 5,193 acres of land, a sugar factory, a cloth factory and two taverns. After his death the estate passed into the possession of his son Raman; in 1911 it comprised 6,030 acres of land. Raman Skirmunt also owned real estate in Minsk and Moscow.

In the course of the First World War, the palace in Porecchi and its collections survived, but the factory buildings and farms were looted by the Germans or destroyed by military actions. In interwar Poland, Skirmunt's financial situation was difficult. However, at the same time, Skirmunt regularly helped the peasants of Poreč, including giving them pieces of land as a gift. According to the historian Alexander Smolyanchuk, the memories of the peasants paint a positive image of the Mayantkov man who treated the peasants well: "Raman spoke only in Belarusian with his servants and the peasants. The peasants said: "He is our master, he even speaks our way." … Above all, he was human. He was kind to his servants and helped more than one elderly peasant by bringing, cutting and chopping firewood in the winter, or pouring grain into their granary in the spring. Not only the maintenance of the estate, but also the surrounding peasants remembered Raman Skyrmunt with one kind word".

== Family ==
During his life, he never married and had no acknowledged children. According to a survey of local residents conducted by the historian Alexander Smolyanchuk, Skirmunt had a mistress, whose name was Kateryna Tereshka (Tiareshchenko), from among the rural workers of his estate. She permanently lived in the palace in the Porečcha estate. According to the testimony of the villagers, Skirmunt had four illegitimate children from Kateryna: Alexander (Oles), Roman, Vladislav and Peter (Petrus). All the children were educated, lived and worked on the estate of Raman Skirmunt. It is known that Oles died in the 1930s, Roman was arrested by the NKVD and died in Siberia, Petrus left for Poland, and Vladislav's fate is unknown.

== Legacy ==
"He was devoted to politics body and soul, he spared neither physical nor moral work for it. Undoubtedly, a man with great spiritual culture and a broad worldview, Skirmunt belonged to the group of those rare Belarusians for whom a Belarusian peasant was closer than a peasant... Skirmunt's speeches at Belarusian gatherings stood out both in content and form. They were always highly patriotic, from the Belarusian point of view, and even simply revolutionary, which caused a storm of enthusiasm among those present," wrote Belarusian religious figure Vincent Godlewski.

In the 1990s, a monument to Skirmunt was erected in the Poreč park – an iron cross with an inscription in Polish. Already in the 21st century, a wooden cross with an inscription in Belarusian appeared near the first cross on the supposed grave of the Skirmunts. In 2009, in Ivacevichy, in the Greek-Catholic parish, the icons of the Mother of God Zhirovitskaya installed a memorial plaque in honor of Skirmunt.
