= Krajowcy =

Central and Eastern European anti-nationalist current

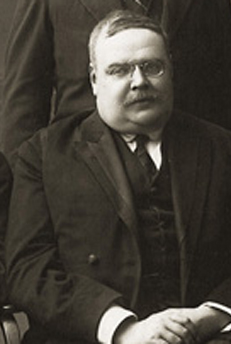
Michał Pius Römer (who later adopted the Lithuanized name Mykolas Römeris) was one of the better-known members of the Krajowcy movement

The Krajowcy (Polish pronunciation: [kraˈjɔft͡sɨ], Fellow Countrymen or Natives; Lithuanian: Krajovcai, Belarusian: Краёўцы) were a group of mainly Polish-speaking intellectuals from the Vilnius Region who, at the beginning of the 20th century, opposed the division of the former Polish–Lithuanian Commonwealth into nation states along ethnic and linguistic lines. The movement was a reaction against growing nationalism in Poland, Lithuania and Belarus. The Krajowcy attempted to maintain their dual self-identification as Polish–Lithuanian (gente Lithuanus, natione Polonus) rather than just Polish or Lithuanian. The Krajowcy were scattered and few in number and as a result failed to organize a widescale social movement.

== Views ==
The Krajowcy were mostly descendants of the nobles of the former Grand Duchy of Lithuania (Lithuanian nobility being part of the szlachta). They identified themselves with Polish culture but maintained a sense of loyalty to the old Grand Duchy. The Krajowcy consisted of two wings: the conservative-moderate wing, composed mostly of large landowners, and the democratic wing, formed from the Vilnius intelligentsia. The conservative wing was generally wary of social upheaval and thus supported authorities of the Russian Empire. They sought expansion of local self-government and cultural freedoms, but did not wish to separate Lithuania from the Russian Empire. The democratic Krajowcy wanted to neutralize ethnic strife and proposed the creation of a civil society in the former territory of the Grand Duchy (principally Lithuania and Belarus), which would include Lithuanians, Poles, Belarusians, Jews, Ukrainians, and other nationalities. To them, national identity was not important as long as the person identified with and felt loyalty to the former Duchy. In their view, the Lithuanian state would be formed based not on ethnicity, but on citizenship. The democratic Krajowcy relied on and encouraged the Belarusian and Lithuanian National Revivals, but only to an extent—they opposed nation states and anti-Polonization. They did not want to cut the cultural ties with Poland as they saw it as an integral part of Lithuanian and Belarusian history and heritage. The democratic Krajowcy either lukewarmly supported or opposed the Polish federalists who dreamed of resurrecting the Polish-led Commonwealth. These ideas were not adopted by the nationalists: the Lithuanians resented Polish culture and the Poles could not adopt regional traditions and loyalties.

== Members ==
Bishop Antanas Baranauskas (1835–1902) held views similar to the early Krajowcy (although he was not one of them). Even though he wrote about "our dear nation" in the Lithuanian language, he was against disintegration of the former Grand Duchy into ethnic entities: he was against both Lithuanian and Polish nationalism and hoped that the Lithuanian and Polish languages and cultures could co-exist and expand together.

The conservative-traditionalist Krajowcy believed that the nobility was the natural leader of nations and wanted to preserve its privileged status. Their members included Ignacy Karol Milewski, Raman Skirmunt and Konstancja Skirmuntt. The democratic Krajowcy were led by Michał Pius Römer (1880–1946), Tadeusz Wróblewski (1858–1925) and Ludwik Abramowicz (1879–1939).

After the outbreak of World War I, and especially after the re-establishment of the Polish and Lithuanian national states, members of the Krajowcy were hard-pressed to hold onto their dual self-identification and had to declare their loyalty to one country or the other. Most of them, like Mieczysław Jałowiecki, declared loyalty to Poland. Some, like Römer and Stanisław Narutowicz, chose Lithuania and became citizens there. Raman Skirmunt, an activist of the Krajowcy movement in Belarus, became one of the leaders of the Belarusian Democratic Republic.

== See also ==
- Regional Party of Lithuania and White Ruthenia
- Tutejszy
