= Zachar Šybieka =

Belarusian historian

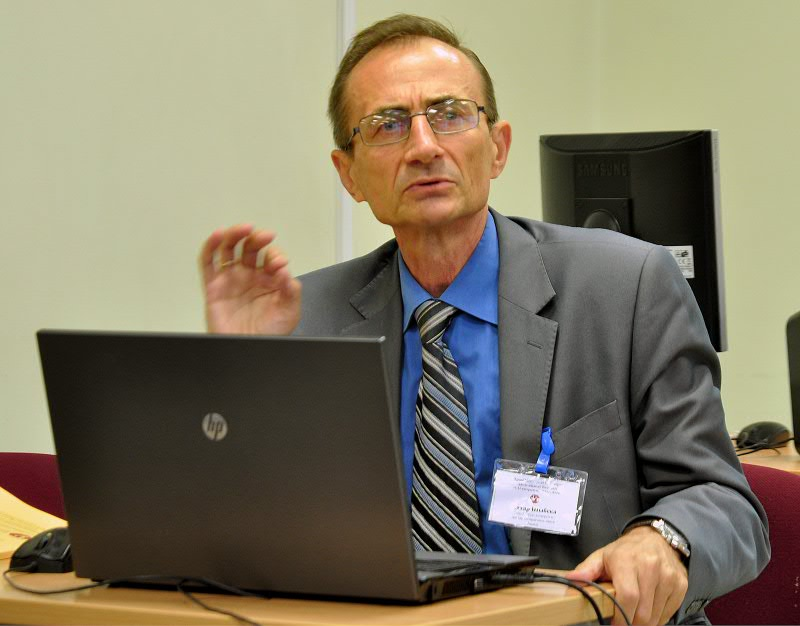
Zachar Šybieka

Dr. Prof. Zachar Vasiljevič Šybieka (Belarusian: Заха́р Васі́льевіч Шыбе́ка, Russian: Заха́р Васи́льевич Шибе́ко; born July 30, 1948) is a Belarusian historian and professor.

== Biography ==
Šybieka was born on July 30, 1948, in the village of Asinauka, Belitskiy Rural Council of the Sennenskiy Region in the Vitebsk Region of the Byelorussian SSR.

In 1972, he graduated from the history department of Belarusian State University, where in 1977 he defended his candidate's dissertation, and in 1998 his doctor's dissertation. In 2003 he was designated a professor.

Šybieka worked as a teacher of history (1972–1974), then as a research fellow at the History Institute of the Academy of Sciences of the Byelorussian Soviet Socialist Republic (1974–1991), and as director of the Department of Belarusian Studies at the Francysk Skaryna National Education Center (1991–1998).

In 1999 he became director of National Museum of History and Culture of the Republic of Belarus.

Since the year 2000, he has served as a professor at the Belarusian State Economic University, in the Department of Economic History.

From September 2001 to September 2002, he simultaneously served as editor-in-chief of "Spadčyna" ("Heritage") magazine.

Šybieka's main areas of expertise are Minsk from the second half of the 19th century through the beginning of the 20th century, Belarusian cities between during the time of 1861–1904, and the Belarusian national movement of the 19th to 20th centuries.

He has more than 200 scholarly publications. His work on Belarusian History in the 19th to 20th centuries received an award from the Polish magazine "Przegląd Wschodni" in 2001, and also, in 2003, the Francysk Bogushevich Prize of the Belarusian PEN Center.

He is a member of International Association for Belarusian Studies (IAB) and of the Belarusian Historical Society.

== Monographs ==
1. Минск в конце ХІХ - начале ХХ в. Очерк социально-экономического разивития ("Minsk at the end of 19th to the beginning of 20th century: an Outline of Socio-economic development. "). Minsk, 1985. P.136.
2. Мінск. Старонкi жыцця дарэвалюцыйнага горада ("Minsk. Pages from the life of a pre-revolutionary city"). 2nd edition. Minsk., 1994. P.341. In co-authorship with S.Šybieka.
3. Гарады Беларусі (60-я гады XIX–пачатак ХХ стагоддзяў) ("Belarusian Cities from the 1860s to the beginning of the 20th century"). Minsk, 1997. P.320.
4. Historia Białorusi. 1795-2000 ("History of Belarus. 1795-2000"). Lublin, 2002 (in Polish). P.571.
5. Нарыс гісторыі Беларусі. 1795-2002 ("Essays in Belarusian History. 1795-2002"). Minsk, 2003. P.490.
6. Dějiny Běloruska ("History of Belarus"). Prague, 2006 (in Czech, in co-authorship with Hienadź Sahanovič). P.400
7. Минскъ сто гадоў таму ("Minsk of One Hundred Years Ago"). Minsk, 2007. P.304.
8. Гарадская цывілізацыя: Беларусь і свет. Курс лекцый. ("Urban civilization: Belarus and World. Lectures."). Vilno, 2009. P.372.

== Reviews and literature about the author ==
1. Энцыклапедыя гісторыі Беларусі ("Encyclopedia of Belarusian History"). Vol. 6. Book ІІ. Minsk, 2001. P.244.
2. Review of the book "Гарады Беларусі (60-я гады ХІХ – пачатак ХХ стагоддзяў)" - Guido Hausman, Koeln, "Jahrbucher fuer Geschichte Osteuropas". Band 48/2000 (in German). S. 450–451.
