= Nachmanas Rachmilevičius =

Jewish politician in interwar Lithuania

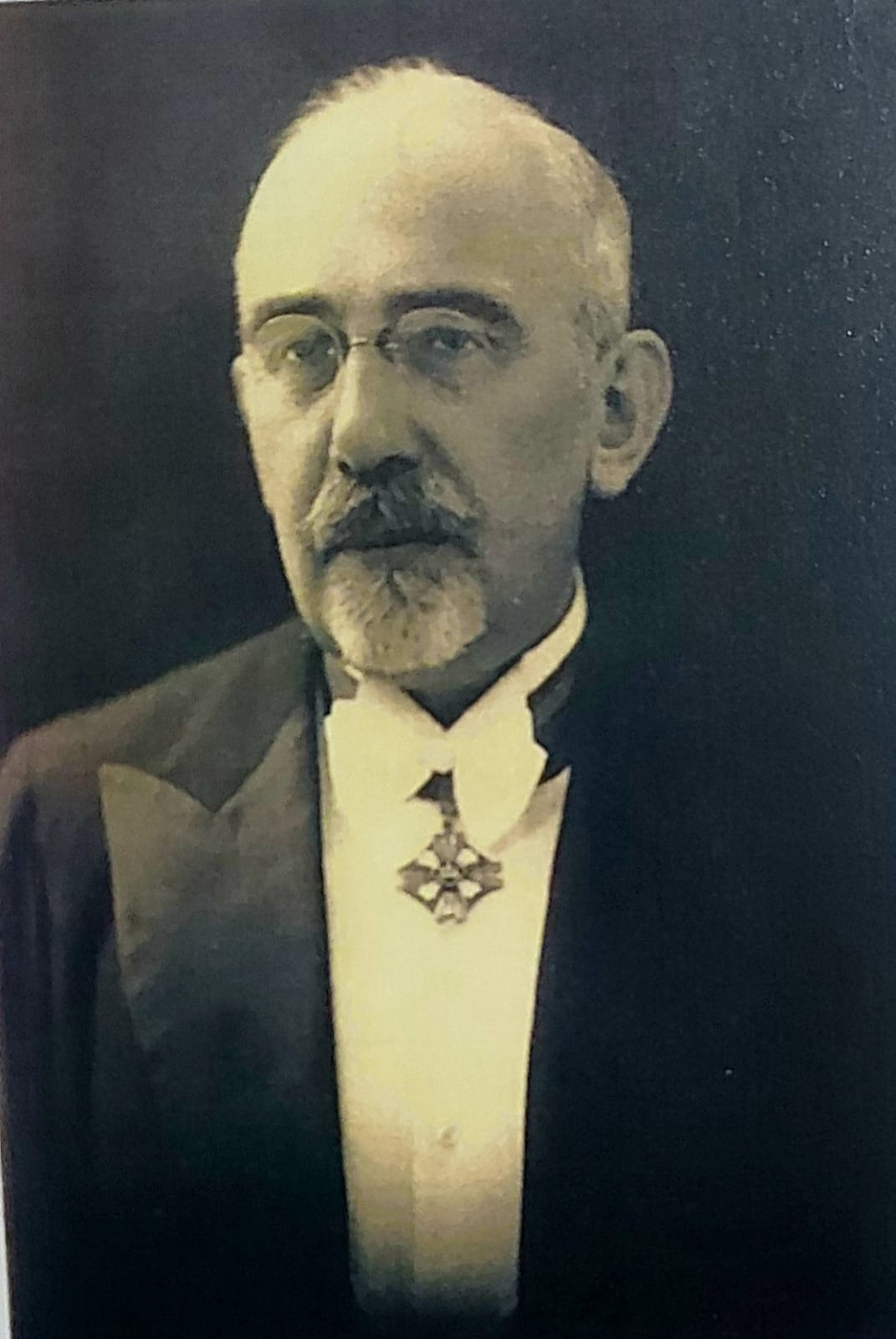
- Rachmilevičius in 1935
- Born: 25 May 1876; Vawkavysk, Russian Empire
- Died: 27 January 1942 (aged 65); Jerusalem, Mandatory Palestine
- Burial place: Mount of Olives Jewish Cemetery
- Other names: Nachman Rachmilewitz; Nachman Rachmilevich
- Education: University of Königsberg; Heidelberg University
- Awards: Order of the Lithuanian Grand Duke Gediminas

Nachmanas Rachmilevičius or Nachman Rachmilewitz (25 May 1876 – 27 January 1942) was a Jewish politician in interwar Lithuania.

After receiving doctorate in philosophy at the Heidelberg University, Rachmilevičius settled in Vilnius where he joined Jewish political life. He became more active during World War I when he joined the Central Relief Committee that organized aid to Jewish war refugees. He supported Lithuania's independence and was coopted into the Council of Lithuania and became vice-minister of trade and industry in 1918. In 1920, he was elected to the Constituent Assembly of Lithuania and the Jewish National Council in Lithuania. After a conflict with secular Jewish political parties in 1923, he retired from politics. In 1930s, he emigrated to Mandatory Palestine where he became general consul of Lithuania in Tel Aviv until his death in 1942.

== Biography ==
=== Early life and activities ===
Rachmilevičius was born on 25 May 1876 in Vawkavysk, then part of the Russian Empire. After graduating from a local school in 1889, he continued his education in Germany. He graduated from a gymnasium in Bensheim in 1896. He studied philosophy, chemistry, physics, mathematics at the University of Königsberg. He received doctorate in philosophy from the Heidelberg University in 1900.

Rachmilevičius moved to Vilnius in 1905 and joined the political life of the Jewish community. For a time, he made a living trading timber. He became more active during World War I. In 1916, he was a member of a nine-member committee that assisted German Ober Ost officials with conducting a population census in Vilnius. He was a vice-chairman of the Central Relief Committee set up to help Jewish war refugees. He was a member of the Vilnius City Council in 1916–1918.

=== Lithuanian government ===
At the end of 1918, Rachmilevičius organized a conference during which Jewish activists declared support for Lithuania's independence. On 11 December 1918, together with Simon Rosenbaum and Jakub Wygodzki, he was coopted to the Council of Lithuania. Rachmilevičius represented the General Zionists. On 26 December 1918, he became vice-minister of trade and industry in the government of Prime Minister Mykolas Sleževičius. At the start of the Lithuanian–Soviet War, he evacuated to Kaunas and continued to work at the ministry until 22 June 1920.

In April 1920, he was elected to the Constituent Assembly of Lithuania on the electoral list of the Democratic Jewish Union, a coalition list of various Jewish organizations. He represented Achdus, which was affiliated with Agudath Israel. Rachmilevičius was active in the Constituent Assembly, frequently speaking during it sessions. He was a member of the Finance and Budget Committee and the Economy Committee. In November 1921, he became deputy to the secretary of the presidium of the Constituent Assembly. During his tenure at the Constituent Assembly, Rachmilevičius proposed about 30 amendments, proposals, and corrections, though vast majority of them were rejected.

In January 1920, the Lithuanian Jewish community elected 34-member Jewish National Council, the supreme institution of Jewish autonomy in Lithuania (a Kehilla). Rachmilevičius became its vice-chairman. In February 1923, Prime Minister Ernestas Galvanauskas formed a new government and selected Bernardas Fridmanas as the Minister for Jewish Affairs. This was done without consulting the Jewish community. Agudath and Rachmilevičius supported Fridmanas, while the Zionists fiercely opposed him. As a result of this conflict, Rachmilevičius was removed from the United Minorities list in the May 1923 elections to the Second Seimas. He subsequently withdrew from politics and political parties.

=== Later life ===
In 1920, Rachmilevičius co-founded the Central Cooperative Lithuanian Jewish Bank and became its long-term board member. He continued to be active in the Jewish community. He was an honorary board member of the educational society Yavne.

He lived in Berlin in 1928–1932 and later emigrated to Mandatory Palestine. On 10 January 1935, he was accredited by King George V as the general consul of Lithuania in Tel Aviv. He continued to represent Lithuania after its occupation by the Soviet Union in June 1940 helping to preserve the legal state continuity of Lithuania.

He died on 27 January 1942 in Jerusalem and was buried at the Mount of Olives Jewish Cemetery. A memorial plaque to Rachmilevičius was affixed to a house on Vilnius Street in Vilnius Old Town in 1997.

== Awards ==
For merits to Lithuania, Rachmilevičius was awarded the Order of the Lithuanian Grand Duke Gediminas in 1933.

== Bibliography ==
- Liekis, Šarūnas (2003). A State within a State? Jewish Autonomy in Lithuania 1918–1925 (in Lithuanian). Versus aureus. ISBN 9955-9613-5-X.
