= First Constituent Charter =

Constitutional document of the Belarusian Democratic Republic

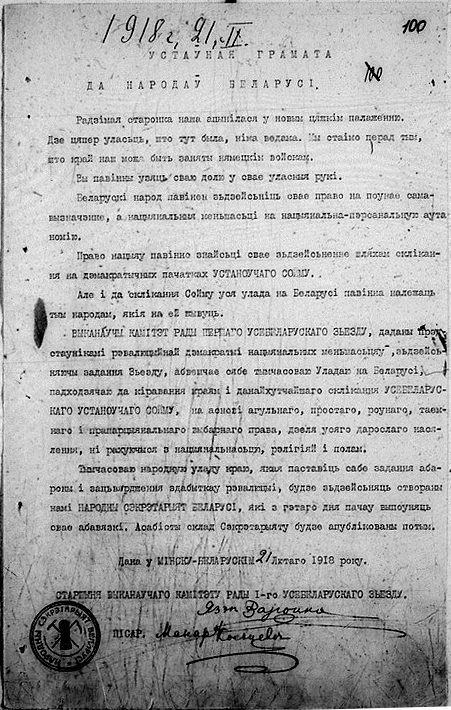
The First Constituent Charter to the peoples of Belarus

The First Constituent Charter to the peoples of Belarus (Belarusian: Першая Ўстаўная грамата да народаў Беларусі, Pieršaja Ŭstaŭnaja hramata da narodaŭ Biełarusi) is a legal and political act issued by the Executive Committee of the Council of the All-Belarusian Congress on 21 February 1918 in Minsk (in the former Governor's House). She called on the Belarusian people to exercise their right to full self-determination, and national minorities — on national and personal autonomy.

The microfilmed original of the act is kept in the 325th fund of the National Archives of Belarus.

== Historical context ==
The rapid offensive of the German Empire, which began on 18 February 1918, forced the regional executive committees and the SNC of the Western region and the front on the night of 19 February 1918 to evacuate from Minsk to Smolensk. This contributed to the resumption of the open activities of the Executive Committee of the Council of the All-Belarusian Congress and the release from Bolshevik captivity of the Central Belarusian Military Council (CBMC). The Executive Committee of the Council of the All-Belarusian Congress issued Order No. 1 of 19 February, which stated that it had taken power into its own hands. The new commander of Minsk, appointed by the Executive Committee, Kastus Ezavitau, issued an order that the German army should see calm civilians who did not want a war. Martial law was imposed under paragraph 2 of the order. At the same time, the Polish Military Organisation (PMO) became active in Minsk.

== Text ==
On 21 February 1918, the Executive Committee of the Council of the All-Belarusian Congress addressed the peoples of Belarus with the First Charter, which stated: "Our homeland is in a new predicament... We are facing the fact that our land may be occupied by German troops." The first Charter called on the Belarusian people to exercise their right to "full self-determination" and national minorities to exercise national and personal autonomy. Referring to the right of peoples to self-determination, the authors of the charter argued that power in Belarus should be formed in accordance with the will of the peoples inhabiting the country. This principle must be implemented through democratic elections to the All-Belarusian Constituent Assembly.

In this document, on 20 February 1918 the Executive Committee announced the establishment of the government - the People's Secretariat of Belarus - a temporary executive body of people's power in the region, which on February 21 began to perform its duties. The secretariat included Paluta Badunova, Jazep Varonka (chairman), Tamaš Hryb, Kastuś Jezavitaŭ, Vasil Zacharka, Pyotra Krecheuski, and Arkadź Smolič.

The Executive Committee of the Council of the All-Belarusian Congress has declared itself the interim government in Belarus. For the first time, the charter did not mention autonomy and the need to remain part of Soviet Russia. Her text in Belarusian and Russian was posted all over Minsk.

The beginning, which fixed the text of the document, contained an image of a high sheaf with crossed scythes and rakes and the inscription on the rim: "PEOPLE'S SECRETARIAT OF BELARUS".

== Results ==
On 21 February 1918, power in Belarus was in the hands of the command of the army of the German Empire. On 22 February, she ordered Polish units to leave Minsk and Belarusian units to lay down their arms. In order not to complicate relations with Russia, the German authorities did not recognize the Belarusian government, occupied the headquarters of the People's Secretariat, requisitioned its property, removed the Belarusian national flags from the buildings and forbade government officials to leave Minsk. However, in late February, negotiations took place between the Secretariat and the German military administration, as a result of which the occupiers recognized the government of Jazep Varonka as a representation of the Belarusian population. The authorities of the German Empire allowed the Secretariat to operate legally in the Minority, mainly in the field of local administration, schooling and publishing.

In response to the conclusion of the Brest Peace Treaty on 3 March 1918 between the German Empire and Soviet Russia, the Executive Committee of the Council of the All-Belarusian Congress responded on 9 March 1918 by adopting the Second Charter. The next step was the declaration of independence of the Belarusian People's Republic on 25 March 1918.

== See also ==
- Second Constituent Charter
- Third Constituent Charter
- Fourth Constituent Charter

== Sources ==
- Ustaŭnyja hramaty BNR, Rada of the Belarusian Democratic Republic
