= Third Constituent Charter =

Constitutional document of the Belarusian Democratic Republic

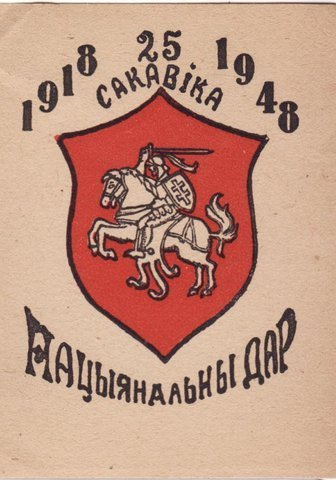
Emigration sticker with the Pahonia for Independence Day, 1948

The Third Constituent Charter (Belarusian: Трэцяя Ўстаўная грамата, romanized: Treciaja Ŭstaŭnaja hramata) is a legal act adopted by the Rada of the Belarusian Democratic Republic on 25 March 1918 in Minsk (in Malin's house), according to which the Belarusian People's Republic was proclaimed an independent state. The anniversary of this historic event is traditionally celebrated by Belarusians as the Freedom Day.

A copy of the Third Constituent Charter is kept in the National Archives of Belarus.

== History ==
The adoption of the Third Charter took place in conditions when, according to the Treaty of Brest-Litovsk, Soviet Russia agreed to the occupation of most of Belarus by the German Empire. The document summed up the results of the internal struggle in the leadership of the Belarusian Democratic Republic and the Belarusian Socialist Assembly for the adoption of the Second Constituent Charter, which dissatisfied the independence movement in the Belarusian Socialist Assembly, Branislaw Tarashkyevich and others. On 9 March 1918, the de facto leader of the BSA, Arkadź Smolič, wrote a letter to Ivan Luckievič, in which he claimed that the republic's leadership did not have enough conscious supporters of the independence of Belarus. On 18 March 1918, at a meeting of the Council of the All-Belarusian Congress of 1917, supporters of independence managed to rename it the Rada of the Belarusian Democratic Republic. They adopted a resolution to include Vaclau Lastouski, Ivan and Anton Luckievich, Jan Stankievič, Dominik Semashko and Yazep Turkevich, representatives of the Vilnius Belarusian Council, in the BNR Council. between Belarus and Russia. On 23 March 1918, Lastouski, the Luckievič brothers, Stankievič and Turkevich arrived in Minsk.

On the same day, the government of the German Empire responded to the statement of the People's Secretariat of Belarus of 9 March 1918 on the proclamation of the Belarusian Democratic Republic. According to the telegram, Chancellor Georg von Hertling could not accept the statement of the People's Secretariat, as it would mean interference in Russia's internal affairs. Thus, the government of the German Empire still considered Belarus an integral part of Russia and did not recognize the Belarusian Democratic Republic. Due to the fact that the Bolsheviks during their withdrawal from Minsk on 19 February 1918 took with them the treasures of the State Bank, on 23 March 1918 the People's Secretariat decided to apply for a loan to the government of the Ukrainian People's Republic. Belarusian government representatives were present at the meeting. At a meeting with his brother, Anton Luckievich proposed to declare full independence of Belarus from Russia, in protest against the trade of Belarusian lands with the German Empire. Anton Luckievich's proposal was met with understanding by the People's Secretariat. The chairman of the People's Secretariat, Jazep Varonka, stated that the proposal should be discussed at a meeting of the BSA faction, as the representatives of this party were the majority in the Rada. In the faction, a group of BSA members led by Makar Kraŭcoŭ initially spoke out against the proposal of BNR activists, but eventually agreed with the majority.

On 24 March 1918, at 8:00 in the evening, the plenary session of the Rada began. Smolič made a report on the political situation in Belarus. He proposed to adopt an act declaring the independence of the Belarusian Democratic Republic. Russian and Polish Zemstvo activists and representatives of the General Jewish Labour Bund opposed the idea of Belarusian socialists. Representatives of the United Jewish Socialist Workers Party, the Jewish Social Democratic Workers' Party, and the Russian Socialist-Revolutionaries abstained. The Zemsky faction announced its withdrawal from the Rada. On 25 March 1918, at 8:00 in the morning, the BNR Council adopted the Third Charter by a majority vote.

== Text ==
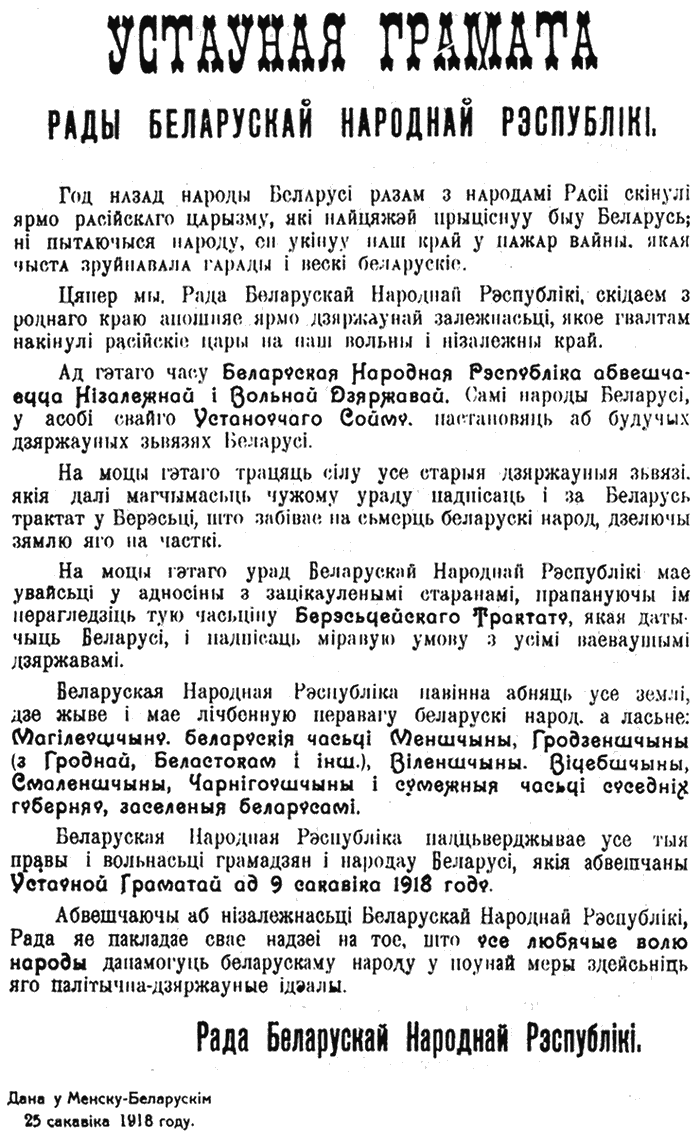
The Third Constituent Charter

The Rada demanded to revise the Brest Peace Treaty. In the lands of the former Russian Empire, where the Belarusian people live and have a numerical advantage, a free, independent state was proclaimed; it included Mahilioŭ, Mensk, Viciebsk, Belarusian parts of Horadnia, Vilno, Smolensk, Chernihiv and neighboring governorate (meaning Suwalki and Kovno Governorate). The rights and freedoms of the citizens and peoples of Belarus, proclaimed by the Second Constituent Charter of 9 March 1918, were also confirmed.

== Signatories ==
The original diploma is a typewritten sheet of paper signed on the reverse side and sealed with the state seal. List of signatories of the diploma:

1. Prime Minister and People's Secretary for Foreign Affairs Jazep Varonka,
2. People's Secretary of Military Affairs Kastuś Jezavitaŭ,
3. People's Secretary of the Economy Jan Sierada,
4. People's Secretary of Agriculture Tamaš Hryb,
5. Head of Affairs Lavon Zajac,
6. People's Secretary of Justice Jaŭchim Bialevič,
7. People's Secretary of Control Piotra Krečeŭski,
8. People's Secretary of Education Arkadź Smolič,
9. People's Secretary of Guardianship Paluta Badunova,
10. People's Secretary of the Post and Telegraph Alaksandar Karabač.

== In art ==
On 25 March 1920, Yanka Kupala, who in 1919 was the Deputy Chairman of the Belarusian National Committee (a post equivalent to Deputy Prime Minister of Belarus), wrote the poem "March 25, 1918 - March 25, 1920. Gadowszczyna - memorial service ":

Not a bright holiday to celebrate

Today will be our people. A delusion about the motherland

He is dealing in this difficult year.

In the poem, the poet expresses disappointment at the results of the recognition of the independent Belarusian state by the then international community (primarily by Soviet Russia and the interwar Polish Republic).

The adoption of the Third Charter as the day of the restoration of independence of Belarus is sung in the poems "On March 25" (1932) and "On March 25, 1933" (1933) by Jazep Hermanovich "March 25" (1935) by Michaś Mashara, "Listen that says the mound" (1944), "March 25" (1946) and "There were Heroes" (1962) by Aleś Zmahar, "March 25 "(1950) by Natallia Arsiennieva. People's Poet of Belarus Nil Hilevich, who in 1991 actively advocated the establishment of March 25 as a national holiday, has a poem with the lines "And the first holiday of the Fatherland will be the Day of the Twenty-fifth of March!". The poem "March 25", written by the People's Poet of Belarus Ryhor Baradulin, ends with the following lines:

25 March —

Our holiday, Password,

And oath!

A large number of art postcards, stickers and envelopes associated with the celebration of the date of adoption of the Third Constituent Charter as Independence Day, were published by the efforts of the Belarusian Diaspora.

== See also ==
- First Constituent Charter
- Second Constituent Charter
- Fourth Constituent Charter

== Sources ==
- Ustaŭnyja hramaty BNR, Rada of the Belarusian Democratic Republic
