= Julius Brutzkus =

Zionist activist

Julius Davidovich Brutzkus
- Born: 1872; Palanga, Courland Governorate, Russian Empire
- Died: January 27, 1951 (aged 80–81); Tel Aviv, Israel
- Other names: Judah Loeb Brutzkus; Joselis Bruckus
- Education: Moscow University
- Movement: Zionism
- Relatives: Boris Brutzkus (brother)

Julius Davidovich Brutzkus or Judah Loeb Brutzkus or Joselis Bruckus (Hebrew: יהודה ליבּ בֶּן־דָּוִד ברוצקוס, Yehuda Loeb ben David Brutzkus; Russian: Ю́лий Давы́дович Бру́цкус; (25 December 1872 – January 27, 1951) was a Lithuanian Jewish activist and politician, and one of the leaders of Zionist movement in the Russian Empire.

Educated as a physician at the University of Moscow, Brutzkus was active with various Jewish organizations, including Lovers of Zion and Jewish Colonization Association, and was editor of several Jewish periodicals, including Voskhod, Evreiskaia zhizn, Rassvet. In 1917, he was elected to the Russian Constituent Assembly. He opposed the Bolshevik regime and moved to Lithuania in 1922. There he was elected to the Jewish National Council (a Kehilla), the First Seimas (parliament of Lithuania), and became the acting Minister for Jewish Affairs. In 1924, he moved to Germany and later to France. There he worked with various Jewish organizations, primarily with the World Jewish Health Society (known by its acronym OSE). During World War II, he attempted to use his status as a former government minister to issue citizenship papers to Jews in detainment camps in France, but was arrested and imprisoned. He was freed and emigrated to the United States. He later moved to Israel where he died in 1951. He was interested in the history of the Jews in Russia and wrote various articles and books on the topic.

== Biography ==
=== Early life and education ===
Brutzkus was born in 1870 in Palanga, Courland Governorate, Russian Empire (in present-day Lithuania). His brother was the economist Boris Brutzkus. In 1878, the family relocated to Moscow where his father and uncle opened a factory of leather goods. Julius studied medicine at the University of Moscow. His family, along with thousands of other Jewish families, was expelled from the city in 1892 (see May Laws). He was able to continue his education and received his degree in 1894. He worked as a physician in Minsk and Saint Petersburg.

=== Activist and newspaper editor ===
Brutzkus joined the Lovers of Zion (Hibbat Zion). He was also active in the Society for the Promotion of Culture among the Jews of Russia (OPE), the Jewish Colonization Association (ICA), and the League for the Attainment of Full Rights for the Jewish People in Russia (Folksgrupe). In 1909, he was elected to the council of the Jewish Colonial Trust, a Zionist bank and parent of present-day Bank Leumi.

Together with Leon Bramson, Brutzkus took part in the Russian Jewish bibliographical work, Systematic Index of Literature Concerning Jews (Систематический Указатель Литературы о Евреях). Beginning in 1895, Brutzkus contributed to the Russian-Jewish periodical Voskhod. In 1899 he was appointed assistant editor of that periodical. However, he resigned in 1902 as the periodical started to oppose Zionism. Brutzkus was also an editor of Evreiskaia zhizn (1904–1906). He was also one of the editorial staff members of Rassvet ("Dawn") reestablished in 1907.

=== Politician ===
In 1917, he was elected to the Russian Constituent Assembly on the Jewish list representing the Minsk Governorate. He was critical of the Bolsheviks and the October Revolution and was briefly arrested. In 1919, he became a member of the central committee of the Russian Zionist Organization. On April 23, 1920, he was arrested in Moscow by the Cheka together with 106 delegates of the Russian Zionist Conference.

In 1919–1920, he lectured on Jewish history at the University of Saint Petersburg. He moved to Lithuania and became one of the leaders of local Jews. He was elected by the Lithuanian Jewish community to the Jewish National Council, the supreme institution of Jewish autonomy in Lithuania (a Kehilla). After the conclusion of the Soviet–Lithuanian Peace Treaty, he worked on a Lithuanian commission tasked with repatriation of cultural and historical valuables from Russia, including the Lithuanian Metrica.

In October 1922, Brutzkus was elected to the First Seimas as a candidate of the Zionist Group for the Nation and Autonomy. However, parties representing ethnic minorities performed poorly in the election and protested "stolen" seats that were allocated to the larger Lithuanian parties. As a result, Brutzkus and other Jewish representatives boycotted the Seimas and did not participate in its proceedings. The Seimas was deadlocked and could not form a government; therefore it was dissolved in March 1923.

Maksas Soloveičikas resigned as the Minister for Jewish Affairs in April 1922. The post remained vacant for some time. Brutzkus became the acting Minister for Jewish Affairs in the cabinet of Prime Minister Ernestas Galvanauskas in early 1923. However, the government dissolved on February 23, 1923, and Brutzkus was replaced by Bernardas Fridmanas.

=== Work in Germany and France ===
In 1924, Brutzkus moved to Berlin, and in 1934 to Paris due to the growing threat of Nazism in Germany. From around 1923, together with Ze'ev Jabotinsky, he was editor of the journal Rassvet ("Dawn"), a weekly organ of the Federation of Russian-Ukrainian Zionists (in exile), and later of the World Union of Zionist Revisionists. Brutzkus was a member of the executive board of the Association for the Promotion of Skilled Trades (known by its acronym ORT) and vice-president of the World Jewish Health Society (known by its acronym OSE). He also worked with YIVO.

During World War II, he worked to save the European Jews. As a former minister in the Lithuania government, he convinced the Consul of Lithuania in Marseille to issue citizenship papers to Jews detained in Camp de Rivesaltes and Camp de Gurs in France. Brutzkus utilized his status to access the camps and distributed hundreds of documents, also to non-Lithuanian nationals, before he was arrested in 1940 and sentenced to six months in prison by the Vichy regime in France. He spent 12 weeks in prison in Nice. In 2022, B'nai B'rith awarded Julius Brutzkus with a Certificate of the Jewish Savior of the Holocaust (posthumously).

=== Later life ===
In April 1941, Brutzkus sailed from Lisbon to New York aboard the liner Nyassa. He became a leader of the Union of Russian Zionists in the United States. In 1949, he moved to Israel to Petah Tikva. He died in Tel Aviv on January 29, 1951.

== Works ==
Throughout the late nineteenth and early twentieth centuries Brutzkus authored various articles and books in Russian, Lithuanian, Polish, English, German, Yiddish, Hebrew, and French on the history of the Jews in Russia; he was particularly intrigued with the history of the Khazars and the early Rus' Khaganate. His archives are kept by the Goldstein-Goren Diaspora Research Center at Tel Aviv University.

=== Selected works ===
- "Pershi zvistki pro Evreev n Polshchi ta na Rusi". Nankovyi Zbirnyk. 24 (1927), pp. 3–11
- "Bukhara." Encyclopaedia Judaica, vol. 4. Berlin 1929. p. 1126.
- Der Handel der westeuropäischen Juden mit dem alten Kiev, in "Zeitschrift für die Geschichte der Juden in Deutschland", No. 2-3, Berlin 1931, pp. 97–110 in German
- "Di Geshikhte fun di Bergyiden oyf kavkaz." (History of the Jewish Mountaineers in Dagestan, Caucasia), YIVO Studies in History, vol.2. Vilna, 1937 (in Yiddish)
- "The Khazar Origin of Ancient Kiev". Slavonic and East European Review, 22, 1944, pp. 108–124
