= Boris Ferber =

Writer

- Born: 1859; Zhitomir, Volhynian Governorate, Russian Empire
- Died: 1895 (aged 35–36); Saint Petersburg, Saint Petersburg Governorate, Russian Empire
- Writing career
- Pen name: Baron Beneditto

Boris Akimovich Ferber (Russian: Борис Акимович Фербер; 1859–1895), also known by the pen name Baron Beneditto (Russian: Барон Бенедитто), was a Jewish Russian writer and educator.

== Biography ==
Ferber was born into a Jewish family in Zhitomir. In 1889, he graduated from the University of Saint Petersburg with a degree in law. He thereupon accepted a position as instructor in the Jewish school of St. Petersburg, teaching there until poor health compelled him to resign.

His first literary labours date from shortly after 1880, when he published several letters in the Russki Yevrei. Ferber soon gained recognition through his sketches of Russian-Jewish life—"Iz Khroniki Myestechka Cherashni" (in Voskhod, 1890), and "Okolo Lyubvi" (ib., 1892)—as well as through numerous critical essays and feuilletons in various numbers of the same periodical for 1892 and 1893.

During a residence in Odessa in 1892–94 Ferber took part in the work of the historico-ethnographical commission of the Society for the Promotion of Culture Among the Jews of Russia; there he wrote "Sketches of the History of the Jews in England" and "Materials for a History of the Jewish Community of London" (in Voskhod, 1894).
