= Vilnius People's Republic =

2015 Internet hoax

The Vilnius People's Republic (VPR; Polish: Wileńska Republika Ludowa (WRL); Russian: Виленская Наро́дная Респу́блика (ВНР), romanised: Vilenskaya Narodnaya Respublika (VNR); Lithuanian: Vilniaus Liaudies Respublika (VLR), also known as the People's Republic of Vilnius (PRV), was an early 2015 anti-Lithuanian, Polish nationalist and pro-Putinist Internet hoax, which has gained significant international media coverage and became a factor resulting in an increased level of national security threat in the Republic of Lithuania and the reintroduction of universal military draft in the country.

== Origins and history ==
On the 28 January 2015, only 9 months after the proclamation of militant pro-Russian separist entities in the Donbas region in Eastern Ukraine, a Facebook page with bi-lingual name in Polish and Russian "Wileńska Republika Ludowa / Виленская Народная Республика" had emerged. Due to the unstable geopolitical context in the Central and Eastern European area, the page quickly caused a notable stir and a following among Polish and Lithuanian users.

The site's main slogan was "We demand the introduction of Polish 'green men' into the Vilnius region and the holding of a referendum among the indigenous population". The page posted multiple photos showing crossed-out signs with Lithuanian names of Vilnius and other cities, which have been vandalised and changed to Polish. VPR directly indicated and referenced the separatist Donetsk People's Republic and Lughansk People's Republic as its predecessors in Ukraine.

In March 2015, the Lithuanian State Defence Council has proposed the reinstatement of compulsory military service, taking into account the geopolitical situation in the region and the conflict in Ukraine, and Seimas had called on the government to prepare relevant legislation.

The VPR site became completely defunct by 2019.

== International reactions ==
=== Poland ===
Grzegorz Schetyna, the Minister of Foreign Affairs during his interview with Dziennik Gazeta Prawna has commented that VPR "is a provocation rooted in resentment, difficult relations, a difficult history, and local elections. We are discussing this with Lithuanians. We should look for something that can unite us. We cannot constantly offend each other. We are a larger nation, which poses a challenge in this matter. We should strive for the rights of Poles in Lithuania, but at the same time enforce their basic commitment to Lithuanian statehood."

=== Lithuania ===
Arvydas Anušauskas, a Member of the Lithuanian National Security and Defence Committee (NSGK) (and the later Minister of Defence), has declared on subject of VPR that "this should not be seen as a joke. The Constitution clearly specifies territorial integrity. In this case, the Constitution of the Republic of Lithuania does not understand any jokes – if there are any attempts on territorial integrity and there are informational and other indications. It is necessary to find responsible persons and react with all the power given by the law. In this case, our laws clearly provide that law enforcement must react to such cases without any reservations. If this is humor, we will find out whether they were joking or not."

On the 29 January 2025, European Foundation of Human Rights has declared that "the [VPR] site violates Article 10 of the Constitution of the Republic of Lithuania, which states that the territory of the state is unified and indivisible into any state entities. Chapter XVI of the Criminal Code of the Republic of Lithuania provides for liability for activities directed against the independence of the Lithuanian state, the unity of its territory, and the state system. Therefore, the EFHR has requested the Prosecutor General's Office to close the site and identify the individuals who contributed to its creation."

== Investigation and allegations ==
On 4 February 2015, the Prosecutor General's Office of the Republic of Lithuania launched a formal investigation in regard with the articles 121. and 122. of the Criminal Code of Lithuania, which strictly prohibit the creation or participation in activities of unconstitutional groups and organisations and punish public incitements to violate the sovereignty or territorial integrity of the country. No individuals responsible were officially identified in the pre-trial investigation at the time.

According to an April 2017 statement of the Polish-French blogger Marcin Rey, the VPR was co-created by Polish journalist Marcin Skalski (who was a staff member of the KRESY.PL portal when the VPR has launched) – along with two members of the Falanga organisation: Bartosz Kasprzak and Michał Prokopowicz. In the same month Marcin Skalski has completely denied his complicinty in co-running the VPR site. Contrary to that, in 2022 he became an author writing for wPrawo.pl portal where he introduced himself as "the VPR's originator".

In October 2024, the abovementioned allegations addressed by Marcin Rey were also publictly confirmed by another former member of Falanga (and former KUKIZ15 MEP candidate) – Alexander Norbert Koss, who has turned from a pro-Putinist to a pro-Western activist. Koss has leaked 2016 audio recordings of Bartosz Kasprzak and Marcin Skalski, who both admitted that they were posting content on the VPR site at the time. Koss has also stated that the former Polish MP and the leader of Zmiana party Mateusz Piskorski was linked with the preparations behind the VPR hoax and in December 2024 the activist's own detailed notification about the formed anti-Lithuanian and anti-constitutional group was sent to the Prosecutor General's Office in Vilnius in the prior month.

== See also ==
- Narva scenario
