= 1st Belarusian Regiment =

Military unit

1st Belarusian Infantry Regiment
- Active: December 1, 1918 – June 15, 1919

1st Belarusian Regiment (Belarusian: 1-ы беларускі полк, Lithuanian: 1-asis Baltgudžių pulkas), officially 1st Belarusian Infantry Regiment (Lithuanian: 1-asis baltgudžių pėstininkų pulkas), commanded by Alaksandar Ružancoŭ, was a Belarusian unit of the Lithuanian Army formed mainly from Grodno's inhabitants in 1919.

It also participated in supporting the Independence of Lithuania during the Lithuanian Wars of Independence, therefore many members of this unit were awarded with the highest state award of Lithuania – Order of the Cross of Vytis.

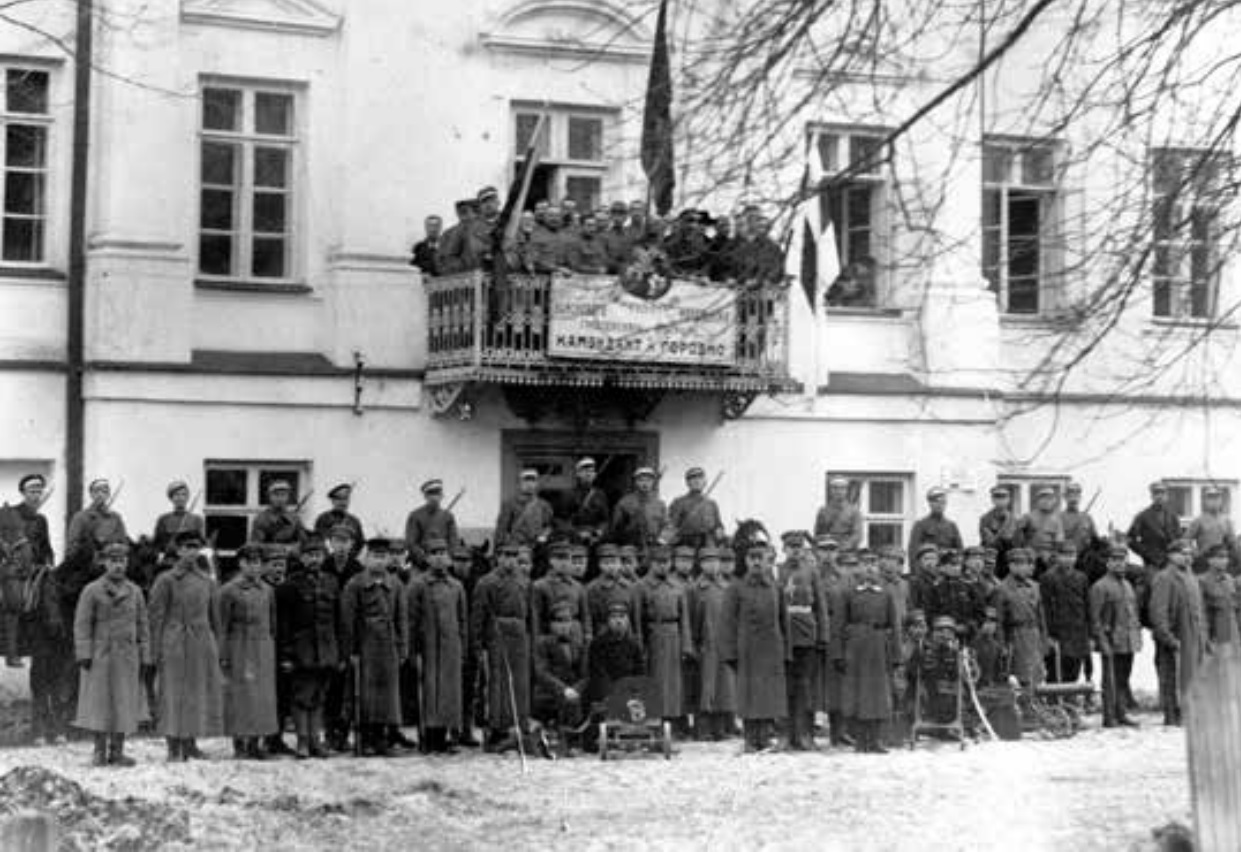
Soldiers of the 1st Belarusian Regiment near the Grodno Military Command decorated with three flags of Lithuania, Belarus, and with the Coat of arms of Lithuania in January 1919

== Background ==
Aware of their weakness, Belarusian activists in the area of German occupation during World War I sought the creation of a federal state, primarily the restoration of the Grand Duchy of Lithuania in some form, or federation with Lithuania on other terms. These plans were abandoned after the creation of the Belarusian People's Republic in March 1918, but were revived in November in the face of pressure from the Bolsheviks.

=== November–December 1918 ===
On November 27, 6 members of the Belarusian Council of Vilnius became part of the Council of Lithuania. And on December 1, the Ministry of Belarusian Affairs was established as part of the Lithuanian government, headed by Jazep Varonka. The agreement also provided for the creation of Belarusian units in the Lithuanian army. This was of great importance to the Lithuanians, since at the time their army numbered only a little over 200 soldiers. The formation of the 1st Belarusian Infantry Regiment began in Vilnius on December 1, but in the face of pressure from the Bolsheviks it was moved to Grodno on December 27, 1918.

== Formation ==
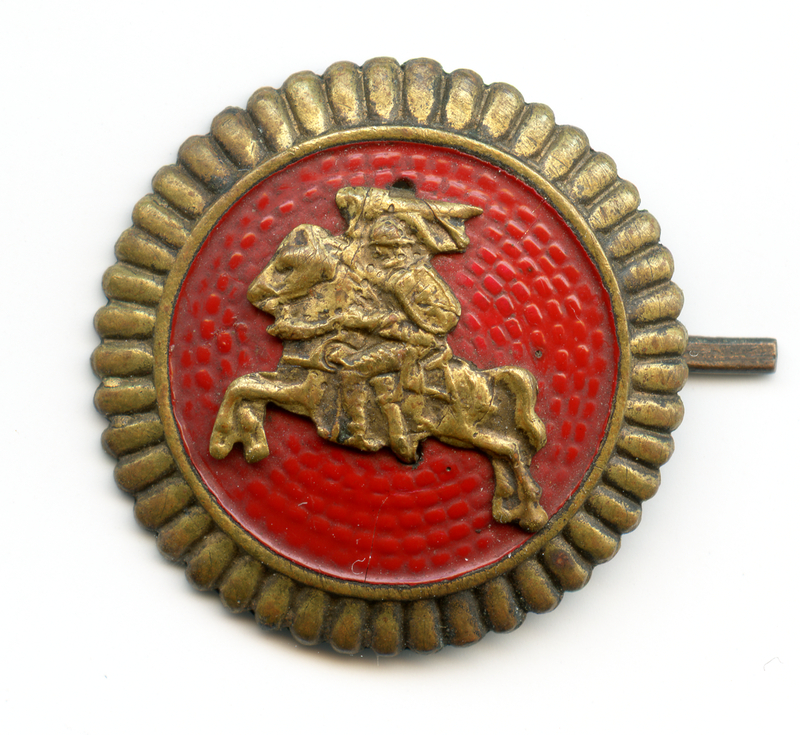
An example of cockade of the Lithuanian Armed Forces with the Coat of arms of Lithuania, dating to 1919. Members of the 1st Belarusian Regiment were required to wear such insignias since 10 February 1919.

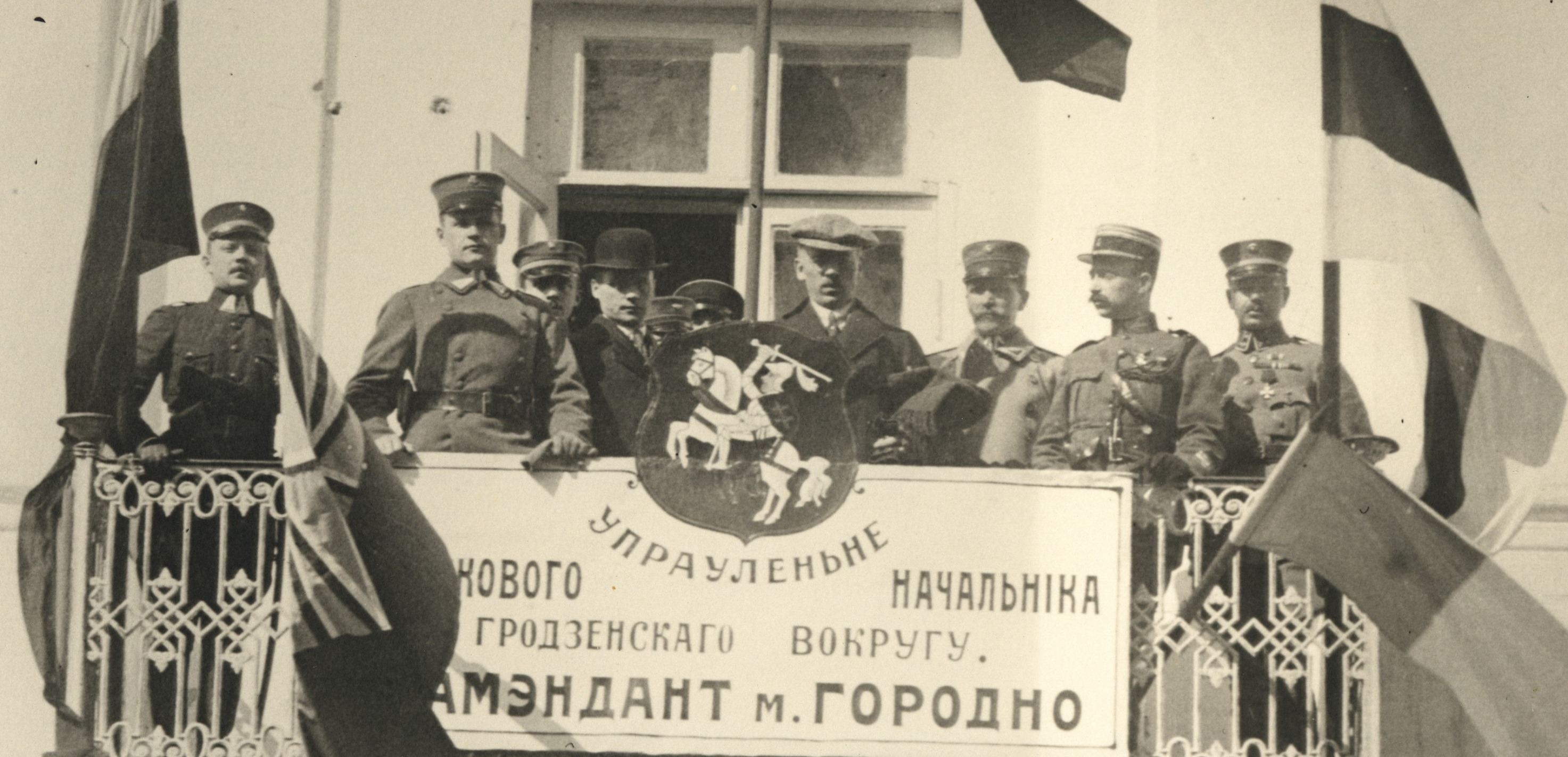
Members of the 1st Belarusian Regiment in Grodno in 1919

Grodno quickly became the center of Belarusian political life, and a number of Belarusian organizations and periodicals were established here. Nonetheless, Varonka relied on the Russian Board of Grodno, headed by Evgeny Kurlov, brother of former Russian governor of Minsk Pavel Kurlov, who was renamed the Belarusian Board of Grodno. Due to intra-Belarusian conflicts and the reluctance of the Imperial German army, which actually controlled the Grodno region, no progress was made in organizing the regiment until February 1919. In mid-January, the Belarusian army numbered 21 officers and a dozen soldiers, and had neither weapons nor barracks.

=== February 1919 ===
The Germans authorized the formation of a Belarusian unit on February 1, 1919. Captain Nikolay Demidov began vigorous recruitment, opened recruitment points in Vawkavysk, Białystok, Slonim, Radun, Lida, Sokółka, Pruzhany, Kobryn, Brest, Vasilishki, Shchuchyn, Druskininkai and others.

Soon the regiment numbered about 800 men, while the Special Battalion of the Grodno command, which was created in parallel, numbered about 350 men. The arming of the army was done in consultation with the German command, funding came from grants from the Lithuanian government and taxes levied on the local population. V. Kozlov was sent to Kaunas to form a volunteer company there, which numbered up to 200 soldiers on April 12 and was renamed the 5th Company of the 1st Belarusian Regiment. On 1 February 1919, the Grodno Military Command was established alongside the 1st Belarusian Regiment and the Grodno's military crew was formed according to a 13 February 1919 decision by Chief of Staff of the Ministry of National Defense of Lithuania. M. Lavrentiev, the commander of the 1st Belarusian Regiment, was appointed as Chief of the Grodno Military Command. On 10 February 1919, the commander of the 1st Belarusian Regiment, following the instructions of the Belarusian Military Secretariat, ordered all officers and soldiers to wear only the Lithuanian Army insignias on their uniforms and most of components of the 1st Belarusian Regiment's uniforms (which were officially confirmed on 7 March 1919) had to be the same as those of other Lithuanian military units.

== Relations with Poland ==
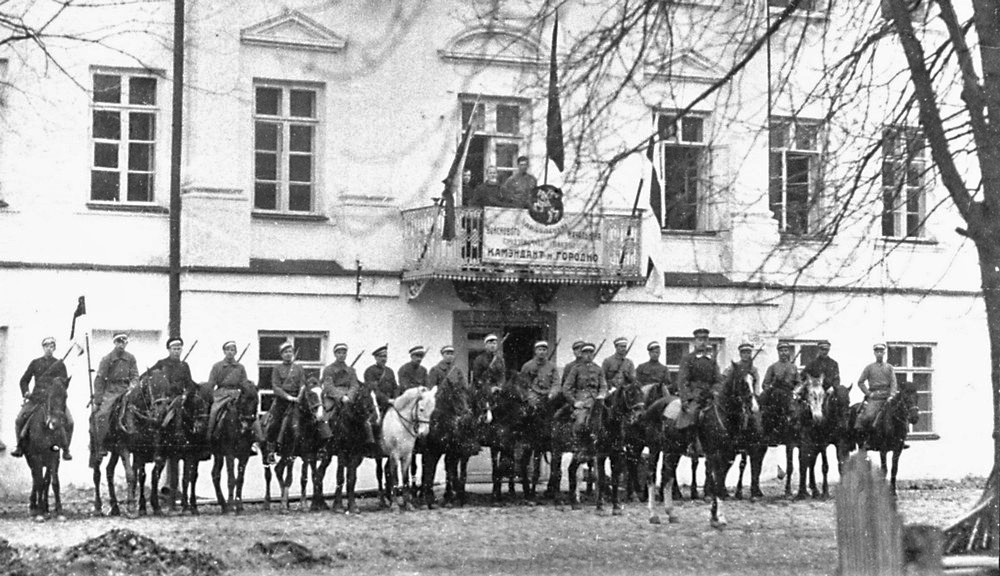
Cavalry of the regiment

Grodno was a lonely Belarusian island, protected by German troops. Polish troops were pressing in from the west and Bolshevik troops from the east. German troops were slowly retreating northward from Ukraine and Belarus. In Grodno, Polish representatives were active, striving to pull the Belarusian army to the Polish side. First Lieutenant Jan Kwiatkowski was active there, while from the beginning of 1919 Stanisław Iwanowski (brother of Vacłaŭ Ivanoŭski), who succeeded in dragging an entire single Belarusian battalion (about 500 soldiers), which was incorporated into the Kaunas Rifle Regiment of the Lithuanian-Belarusian Division. He also organised local branch of the Polish Military Organisation.

=== February 1919 ===
On February 5, Poland signed an agreement with Germany regulating the withdrawal of the German army from western Belarus and giving the Polish army the opportunity to march eastward. On February 14, 1919, Polish troops came into contact with the Bolshevik army near Vawkavysk.

=== March ===
The Belarusian authorities, informed by the Germans of the agreement, began to leave Grodno in March 1919. Lithuanian authorities proposed moving the army to Sejny and Suwalki, which the Belarusians rejected. They obtained a loan of 4 million marks from the Ukrainian People's Republic, which gave them some independence. It is possible that at that time the regiment ceased to be maintained from the Lithuanian budget and began to be maintained from Belarusian funds.

=== April ===
In early April, German troops began evacuating Grodno. Col. Demidov pulled the 5th company from Kaunas to reinforce his position. On April 16, 1919, the Polish Army launched a wide-ranging offensive against the Bolsheviks from Lida to Vilnius, and entered Grodno. Gen. Wojciech Falewicz took over the command of the Grodno Fortress.

When the regimental commander Col. Kastuś Jezavitaŭ was in Warsaw on a Lithuanian diplomatic mission, the then-commander of the regiment Col. Uspensky signed an agreement with the Polish command on April 23, under which the regiment was to remain an autonomous unit within the Lithuanian army, but would subordinate itself to the Polish command in the fight against the Bolsheviks. On April 24, Jezavitaŭ returned to Grodno and defied this agreement, he wanted to evacuate the regiment, but the German and Lithuanian commands ordered him to stay. In view of this, on April 27 he himself left for Kaunas, leaving the command to Col. Antonov. Same day Polish troops appeared in Grodno, and on April 28 they disarmed and arrested Belarusian hussars. On April 29, German troops completely left Grodno, which came under Polish control. Earlier, on April 19, 1919, the Polish cavalry under Władysław Belina-Prażmowski captured Vilnius from Bolsheviks. The Lithuanian government appointed a Russian, an officer of a Belarusian regiment, Leonid Kalugin, as commander of the city of Grodno in place of Demidov, although Demidov did not resign.

=== May ===
Initially, the coexistence of Polish and Belarusian troops was good. On May 3, a joint parade was held. On May 5, the hussars were dismissed and went with the 5th company to Druskininkai and then to Kaunas. On May 30, Falewicz handed over an order from front commander Gen. Stanisław Szeptycki to move to Slonim. Col. Antonov refused, citing the April 23 agreement.

=== June 1919 ===
Poland feared a conflict with Germany at the time, so it could not condone the stationing of an alien unit in Grodno, so they decided to disarm the regiment on June 1.

Soldiers were disarmed, looted, and publicly humiliated by the Polish soldiers, who even ripped off the Belarusian officers' insignias from their uniforms and trampled these symbols with their feet in public, because this unit refused to carry out the Polish orders and remained loyal to Lithuania. The Lithuanian and Belarusian flags, and signs with the Lithuanian coat of arms were torn off, with the Polish gendarmes dragging them on the dusty streets for ridicule; instead of them, Polish signs and flags were raised in their place everywhere in the city.

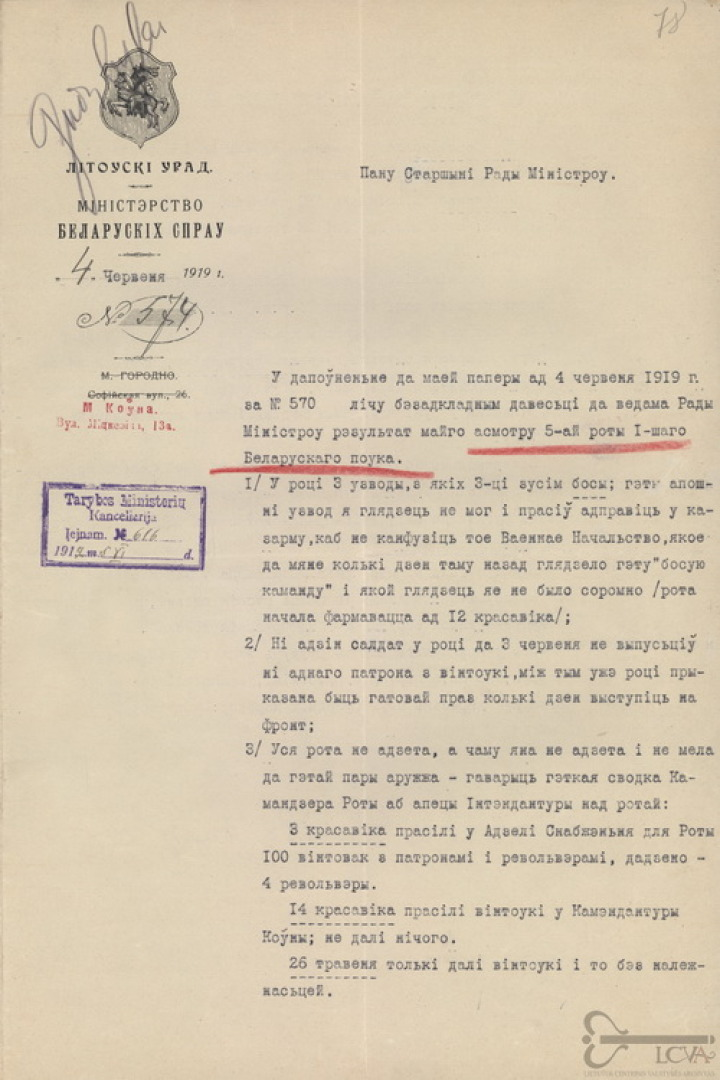
Lithuanian Ministry for Belarusian Affairs 4 June 1919 report sent to the Government of Lithuania about the 1st Belarusian Regiment military actions

On June 3 the head of the Polish state Józef Piłsudski arrived in Grodno. On this occasion, the guard was removed from the Belarusian barracks, and soldiers were allowed to move freely around the city. Pilsudski received Col. E. Haydukevych, who was replacing the ill Antonov in the role of commander. On June 11, the Polish command separated the soldiers according to religion, Catholics were escorted to Polish barracks, while Orthodox and Jews were demobilized. Officers were offered service in the Polish army. Demidov and for a short time Antonov were arrested. Officers were not allowed to go to Kaunas, but some were allowed to go to the White Russian army of Gen. Nikolai Yudenich. A part of the Belarusian regiment's soldiers and officers escaped to Kaunas to continue serving Lithuania.

== Organization and command ==
- Commander: Col. M. Lavrentiev, later Col. Kastuś Jezavitaŭ
- Chief of Staff: Col. P. Ravich-Scherba
- Head of training: Col. A. Uspensky
- Head of logistics: U. Yushkevich
- Special Battalion of Grodno Headquarters : Capt. Nikolay Demidov
  - Hussar Squadron Commander: Capt. M. Glinsky
- 1st Battalion Commander: Lt. Col. E. Haydukevych
- 2nd Battalion Commander: Col. U. Mikhalovsky
- 3rd Battalion Commander: Col. Kuzmin-Karavyev
- 4th Battalion Commander: Col. Volkov

== Bibliography ==
=== Polish-language sources ===
- Łatyszonek, Oleg (1995). Białoruskie formacje wojskowe 1917–1923 [Belarusian military formations 1917–1923] (in Polish). Białystok: Białoruskie Tow. Historyczne.
- Łossowski, Piotr (1996). Konflikt polsko-litewski 1918–1920 [Polish–Lithuanian conflict 1918–1920] (in Polish). Warsaw: Książka i Wiedza.
- Wyszczelski, Lech (2008). Wilno 1919-1920 (in Polish). Warsaw: Bellona. ISBN 978-83-11-11249-0.

=== Lithuanian-languages sources ===
- Uspensky, Aleksandr (1925). "l-as gudų pulkas Gardine ir kaip jis tapo lenkų nuginkluotas (1918. XI. I–1919. VIII. 17)". Karo Archyvas (in Lithuanian). 1.
- Surgailis, Gintautas (2020). Lietuvos kariuomenės gudų kariniai daliniai 1918–1923 m. (PDF) (in Lithuanian). Vilnius: General Jonas Žemaitis Military Academy of Lithuania. ISBN 978-609-8277-00-5.
