= Jakub Wygodzki =

Polish–Lithuanian Jewish politician, Zionist activist and medical doctor

- יעקב ויגודסקי
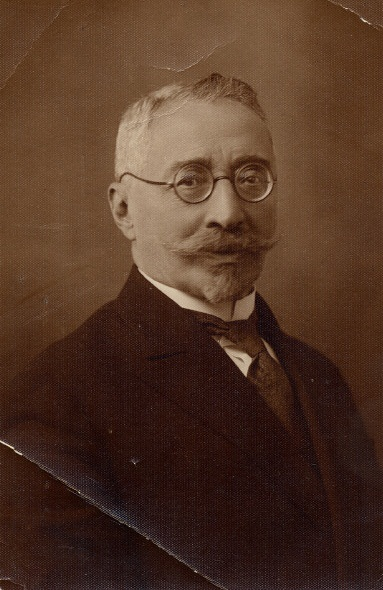

Lithuanian Minister for Jewish Affairs
- In office December 11, 1918 – January 1919
- Prime Minister: Augustinas Voldemaras; Mykolas Sleževičius
- Preceded by: none
- Succeeded by: Max Soloveitchik

Personal details
- Born: June 3, 1857 Babruysk, Russian Empire
- Died: August 1941 (age 84) Vilnius, Reichskommissariat Ostland
- Cause of death: The Holocaust
- Citizenship: Russian Empire; Second Polish Republic
- Party: Constitutional Democratic Party; Bloc of National Minorities
- Children: Writer Aleksandra Brushtein (1884–1968)
- Education: Imperial Military Medical Academy
- Occupation: Doctor, political activist

Jakub Wygodzki (1856–1941; Lithuanian: Jokūbas Vygodskis, Hebrew: יעקב ויגודסקי) was a Polish–Lithuanian Jewish politician, Zionist activist and a medical doctor. He was one of the most prominent Jewish activists in Vilnius (Vilna, Wilno). Educated as a doctor in Russia and Western Europe, he established his gynecology and pediatric practice in 1884. In 1905, he was one of the founding members of the Constitutional Democratic Party (Kadets) in Vilnius Region. In 1918, he was co-opted to the Council of Lithuania and briefly served as the first Lithuanian Minister for Jewish Affairs. After Vilnius was captured by Poland, Wygodzki was elected to the Polish parliament (Sejm) in 1922 and 1928. He died in the Lukiškės Prison during the first months of the German occupation of Lithuania during World War II.

== Biography ==
=== Early life and education ===
Wygodzki was born to a family of Hasidic Jews. His family moved to Vilnius (Vilna, Wilno) in 1860 where his father was a merchant, supplying the local garrison of the Imperial Russian Army with clothes. He was the eldest of seven brothers and received traditional Jewish education at a cheder.

He studied at Marijampolė Gymnasium and Imperial Military Medical Academy in Saint Petersburg. He was arrested for anti-Tsarist activities and involvement with a revolutionary group. Later he studied medicine in Vienna, Berlin, Paris. In 1884, he returned to Vilnius and established his practice as gynecologist and pediatrician. He published medical articles in Russian and German journals.

=== Activist in Vilnius ===
He joined Jewish cultural and political life. He was one of the first Zionist activist in Vilnius and chaired their organization. In 1905, during the Russian Revolution, he was one of the founding members of the Constitutional Democratic Party (Kadets) in Vilnius Region. In 1908, he established and chaired the Union of Jewish Doctors. During World War I, he was a member of a Jewish relief committee and established daily Yiddish newspaper Flugblat. For anti-German protests, he was arrested by the German police in March 1917 and imprisoned in the Czersk POW camp until April 1918.

He supported Lithuanian independence and, together with Nachmanas Rachmilevičius and Simon Rosenbaum, was co-opted to the Council of Lithuania on December 11, 1918. The same day he became the first Lithuanian Minister for Jewish Affairs. He held the post briefly as he did not evacuate from Vilnius with the rest of the government at the start of the Lithuanian–Soviet War. He was briefly imprisoned by the Bolsheviks.

=== Second Polish Republic ===
In 1919, when Poland captured Vilnius, Wygodzki was chairman of the Jewish community in the city. He opposed the Żeligowski's Mutiny and the Republic of Central Lithuania and urged people to boycott the elections in 1922. Nevertheless, he accepted the situation and became a member of the Bloc of National Minorities and was elected to the Polish parliament (Sejm) in 1922 and 1928. In the Sejm, Wygodzki worked to improve Jewish education in Hebrew and Yiddish languages. He was also a member of the Vilnius Council from 1919 to 1929.

After the invasion of Poland in September 1940, Wygodzki organized relief for the Jewish refugees. In June 1941, Nazi Germany invaded the Soviet Union and occupied the city. Wygodzki joined the pre-ghetto Judenrat on July 24. He was arrested at the end of August and died in the Lukiškės Prison.

== Writings ==
Wygodzki contributed to the press, publishing his articles in Tsayt, Vilner Tog, Haynt, Nasz Przegląd, and others. He published three books of his memoirs: In shturm (In the Storm; 1921) on the German occupation during World War I; In gehenom (In Hell; 1927) on his imprisonment by the Germans; and In Sambatyon (1931) on his activities in the Sejm.
