= Flugblat =

Yiddish newspaper

Flugblat פלוג בלאט
- Type: Daily
- Founder(s): Jacob Wygodzki
- Founded: October 13, 1915
- Language: Yiddish
- Ceased publication: January, 1916
- Headquarters: Vilnius

Flugblat (Yiddish: פלוג בלאט, 'Leaflet') was a Yiddish-language daily newspaper published in Vilnius between October 13, 1915 and January, 1916, during the German occupation of the city. Flugblat was the first Yiddish newspaper to appear in Vilnius following the July 1915 Russian ban on non-Cyrillic press. The issues of Flugblat consisted of one or two pages containing translations of official telegram wires from the German military for the Eastern Front and decrees from the German authorities to the local population.

The newspaper was shut down when Feivel Margolin, a known journalist, obtained an exclusive permit to print a new daily Yiddish newspaper for the entire Ober Ost district, Letze nayes. Altogether, 100 issues of Flugblat were printed.
