= Ethnic minorities in Lithuania =

The government of Lithuania has made provision for ethnic minorities since 1918. A substantial Jewish group that existed up to World War II was almost eliminated in the Holocaust. The Census of 2011 showed that 15.8% of inhabitants belonged to ethnic minorities: the two largest groups were the Poles and the Russians, although the proportions had decreased since independence in 1989. Other minorities include the Samogitians - not classified in the Census - and the historically important Latvian-speaking Kursenieki.

== Independent Lithuania (1918–1940) ==
From 1918 to 1924 two ministries were specifically dedicated to ethnic minorities, the Ministry for Belarusian Affairs and the Ministry for Jewish Affairs.

On May 12, 1922, a Declaration concerning the protection of minorities in Lithuania was signed at Geneva under the auspices of the League of Nations. Its article 1 stipulated that "The stipulations of this Declaration are recognized as fundamental laws of Lithuania and no law, regulation or official action shall conflict or interfere with these stipulations, nor shall any law, regulation or official action now or in the future prevail over them.".

art.4 §4 Notwithstanding the establishing by the Lithuanian Government of an official language, appropriated facilities will be given to Lithuanian citizens with another language than Lithuanian, for the use of their language, be it by oral way or by written way, before the courts.

== World War II (1939–1945) ==
There was a significant Jewish community in Lithuania prior to World War II, and an influx of Jews from Nazi-occupied Poland in 1941 increased this population to its maximum of nearly 250,000. However, by 1944, the vast majority of this population had been murdered, deported, or sent to concentration camps.

== Soviet Lithuania (1944–1990) ==
In 1989, a Law on National Minorities was voted and a Committee of Nationalities for the Government of the Republic of Lithuania was established. Since 1999, it has been renamed Department of National Minorities and Émigrés.

== Independent modern Lithuania (1990–present) ==
The Council of Europe's Framework Convention for the Protection of National Minorities was signed on February 1, 1995, and ratified on March 23, 2000. It came into force on July 1, 2000. Several other national laws have a direct or indirect link to minorities, e.g. the State Language Law (1995) and the Law of Education (1991, amended in 2003).

According to the census conducted in 2011, about 15.8% of Lithuania's population was composed of ethnic minorities:

Ethnic groups	Total population	Compared to all population, %
Total	3,043,429	100
ethnic Lithuanians	2,561,314	84.2
Poles	200,317	6.6
Russians	176,913	5.8
Belarusians	36,227	1.2
Ukrainians	16,423	0.5
Jews	3,050	0.1
Tatars	2,793	0.09
Germans	2,418	0.07
Roma	2,115	0.07
Latvians	2,025	0.06
Armenians	1,233	0.04
Moldovans	540	0.01
Azerbaijani	648	0.02
Chinese	500	0.015
Georgians	372	0.01
Estonians	314	0.01
African	264	0.01
Karaites	241	0.008
Bulgarians	170	0.006
Chuvashs	164	0.005
Greeks	159	0.005
Uzbeks	157	0.005
Kazakhs	144	0.005
Ossetians	119	0.004
Finns	109	0.004
French	104	0.003
Koreans	67	0.002
Other	(2,356)	0.1
No response on the ethnicity question	32,978	1.1

The percentage of ethnic Lithuanians has increased from 79.6% in 1989 to 83.5% in 2001; the percentage of Poles has decreased from 7.0% to 6.7%, Russians from 9.4% to 6.3%.

According to the 2001 census, in Šalčininkai District Municipality as well as in the town of Visaginas (which enjoys a special status) ethnic Lithuanians are in minority (10 and 15 per cent respectively).

== Samogitians ==
The respondents in the various censuses do not have the option to choose for the Samogitian ethnicity. This was contested before a court by the Žemaitē bova, īr ė būs ("Samogitians were, are and will be") Association, also named Žemaitiu soeiga, which considers that it is a violation of the Constitution, more particularly of the provision that everyone has the right to decide on his nationality. According to Egidijus Skarbalius, the founder of the Samogitian Party, a new Samogitian autonomist party founded in April 2008, Samogitians could be as many as one million, thus representing a third of Lithuania's total population.

== Kursenieki ==
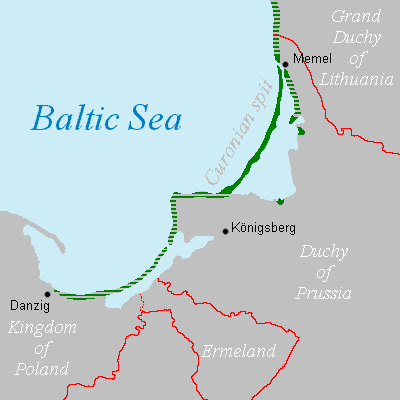
Curonian-populated area in 1649

While today the Kursenieki, also known as Kuršininkai, are a nearly extinct Baltic ethnic group living along the Curonian Spit, in 1649 Kuršininkai settlement spanned from Memel (Klaipėda) to Danzig (Gdańsk). The Kuršininkai were eventually assimilated by the Germans, except along the Curonian Spit where some still live. The Kuršininkai were considered Latvians until after World War I when Latvia gained independence from the Russian Empire, a consideration based on linguistic arguments. This was the rationale for Latvian claims over the Curonian Spit, Memel, and other territories of East Prussia which would be later dropped.

== See also ==
- Baltic Germans
  - Klaipėda Region
- Baltic Russians
