= Boris Brutskus =

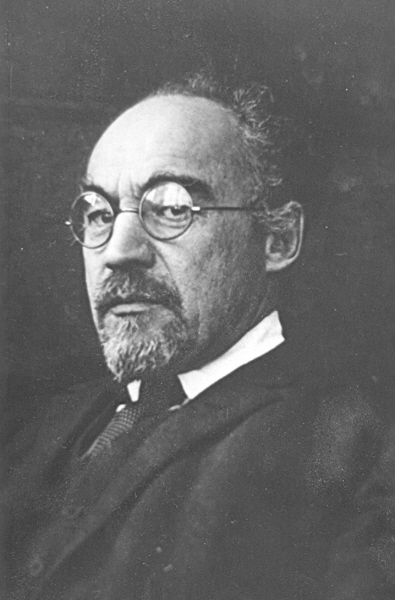
- Born: Palanga (Russian Empire)
- Died: 7 December 1938; Jerusalem
- Education: Institute of Agriculture and Forestry
- Occupations: Economist, statistician, agriculturist
- Children: David Anatol Brutzkus
- Relatives: Julius Brutzkus

Boris (Ber) Davydovich Brutskus (Russian: Бори́с (Бер) Давы́дович Бру́цкус, Hebrew: בוריס (בר/דּוֹב) בֶּן־דָּוִד ברוצקוס, German: Boris Brutzkus; October 15/October 3 (Russian information), 1874 – December 6/December 7 (same with birthdate), 1938) was an economist from the Russian Empire.

Brutskus was born in Polangen/Palanga in Lithuania, which was then part of the Russian Empire. His brother was the historian and politician Julius Brutzkus.

Brutskus published an English translation for Economic Planning in Soviet Russia with an introduction by Friedrich Hayek in 1935.

He was forced into exile by the Bolshevik government in 1922.

He died in 1938 in Jerusalem.

== Literary works ==
- Экономия сельского хозяйства, народно-хозяйственные основа. 1924.
- Die Lehren des Marxismus im Lichte der russischen Revolution, 1928
- B. D. Bruckus: »Ėkonomičeskija osnovy sovremennago političeskago krizisa Rossii« [i. e. Die ökonomischen Ursachen der gegenwärtigen politischen Krise Rußlands]. Russkij naučnyj institut RNI, Berlin, January 27, 1928 (i.e. Russian scientific institute)
