= Fourth Constituent Charter =

The Fourth Constituent Charter (Belarusian: Чацьвертая Ўстаўная грамата, Čaćviertaja Ŭstaŭnaja hramata) is a resolution of the Council of People's Ministers of the Belarusian People's Republic of November 29, 1918 on the Establishment of Local Self-Government Institutions at the Volast, Paviet and Miesto Levels: "Let all the citizens of Belarus unite around the Council of the Belarusian People's Republic and the Belarusian Government and create their own parish, county and local Belarusian Councils throughout Belarus".

== Text ==
The Rada of BNR, which received its powers from the Belarusian People at the All-Belarusian Congress, announced in its letters of March 9 and 25, 1918, that all power in the Belarusian land would pass into the hands of the people. The land, forests and natural resources of the region have been declared a popular opinion. Following this, the Council began to build an independent Belarusian state on the basis established by the Charter of March 25 this year. The German occupation suspended this work and made it impossible to transfer power to the people and resolve the land issue on a fair basis. Now that the German people have established a new order on their land, and the occupying forces are leaving our land, the time has come for the Belarusian people, suffering for hundreds of years in foreign captivity, to become full masters of their free and independent land. Let all the citizens of Belarus unite around the Rada of the Belarusian People's Republic and the Belarusian Government and create their own parish, county and local Belarusian Councils throughout Belarus, so that the organized people can truly take control of their page. The Belarusian Government will first of all strive to ensure that our people establish true freedom for all its citizens as soon as possible. Council of People's Ministers of the BNR. Minsk, November 29, 1918

— Rada of People's Ministers

== See also ==
- First Constituent Charter
- Second Constituent Charter
- Third Constituent Charter

== Sources ==
- Ustaŭnyja hramaty BNR, Rada of the Belarusian Democratic Republic
