= Second Constituent Charter =

Constitutional document of the Belarusian Democratic Republic

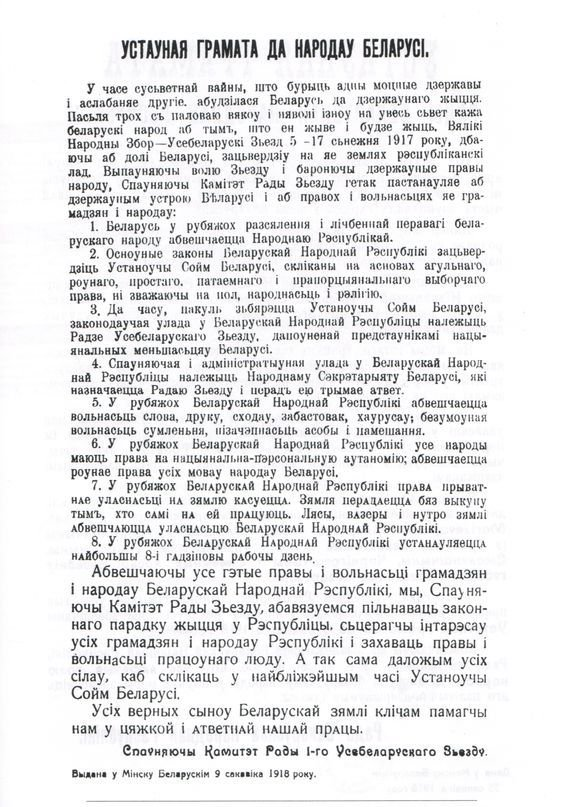
The Second Constituent Charter to the peoples of Belarus

The Second Constituent Charter to the peoples of Belarus (Belarusian: Другая Ўстаўная грамата да народаў Беларусі, Druhaja Ŭstaŭnaja hramata da narodaŭ Biełarusi) is a legal act adopted by the executive committee of the Council of the All-Belarusian Congress on March 9, 1918, in Minsk. Announced the formation of the Belarusian People's Republic as a democratic parliamentary and legal state, defined its territory within the settlement and numerical superiority of Belarusians. Embodied the then achievements of political and legal thought.

== Historical context ==
Adopted on February 21, 1918, the First Constituent Charter proclaimed the executive committee of the Council of the All-Belarusian Congress a temporary people's power in Belarus. However, on March 3, 1918, Soviet Russia concluded the Brest Peace Treaty, according to which it transferred most of the territory of Belarus to the German Empire. At the same time, the German authorities undertook not to recognize the states declared in the occupied territories upon signing the treaty.

In these circumstances, Belarusian activists went to adopt the Second Charter.

== Text ==
The text of the Second Constituent Charter consisted of eight paragraphs.

The Belarusian People's Republic was proclaimed within the limits of the settlement and numerical superiority of the Belarusian people. The Council of the All-Belarusian Congress, supplemented by representatives of the national minorities of Belarus, temporarily took over the legislative power in the country. The basic laws of the Belarusian People's Republic were later to be approved by the Constituent Assembly of Belarus, convened on the basis of universal and equal suffrage.

The rights and freedoms of citizens and peoples of the Belarusian People's Republic were proclaimed: freedom of speech, press, assembly, strikes, allies; freedom of conscience, inviolability of person and premises; the right of peoples to national and personal autonomy; equality of all languages of the peoples of Belarus. Private ownership of land was abolished, the transfer of land without redemption to those who worked on it was announced; forests, lakes and subsoil were declared state property. The maximum length of the working day was 8 hours.

== Results ==
On March 18, 1918, at a meeting of the Council of the All-Belarusian Congress of 1917, supporters of independence managed to rename it the Council of the BNR, which on March 23, 1918, included the Vilnius Belarusian Council. On March 25, 1918, the BNR Council adopted the Third Constituent Charter, which proclaimed the independence of the Belarusian People's Republic.

There is a late adoption of the Second Constituent Charter — after the ratification of the Brest Peace Treaty. The German Empire, following his articles, could not recognize the BNR. In addition, German ruling circles were alarmed by the nationalization of land, lakes and forests. There is also dissatisfaction among BNR activists with the lack of a clear definition of the territory of the Belarusian state, as well as the nature of Belarus' relations with other states, including Russia. These issues were resolved by the Third Charter.

== See also ==
- First Constituent Charter
- Third Constituent Charter
- Fourth Constituent Charter

== Sources ==
- Ustaŭnyja hramaty BNR, Rada of the Belarusian Democratic Republic
- Шупа С. Падарожжа ў БНР (4). Абвясьцілі БНР, дэкляравалі правы і свабоды, Радыё Свабода, February 23, 2018
