= European Foundation of Human Rights =

- Europos žmogaus teisių fondas
- Established: 2010
- Type: Foundation
- Headquarters: Vilnius, Lithuania
- Location: J. Dobkevičiaus g. 6, Vilnius LT-02189
- Field: Human rights
- Website: www.efhr.eu

European Foundation of Human Rights or EFHR (Lithuanian: Europos žmogaus teisių fondas, Polish: Europejska Fundacja Praw Człowieka, Russian: Европейский Фонд Прав Человека) is an organization established in 2010 in Lithuania in response to the increasing number of human rights violations within the country of Lithuania, and more specifically regarding the rights of ethnic minorities.

== History and mission ==
The activity of the EFHR focuses mainly on protecting and promoting the rights of ethnic minorities living in Lithuania, particularly the Polish minority which numbers at 6.6% of the total population. From the very beginning, the EFHR has struggled against laws forbidding the Lithuanian Poles using the original Polish spelling of their names in passports and other official documents, or of putting up Polish-language street signs. The Foundation also takes measures to prevent all forms of discrimination with special regard to the employment discrimination.

The European Foundation of Human Rights was established during the growing legal uncertainty around the situation of ethnic minorities in Lithuania. As of 1 January 2010, the Law on National Minorities from 1989, which previously regulated minority rights, is no longer in force and no law has been adopted to fill the legal vacuum. However, Lithuania in 2000 ratified the Framework Convention for the Protection of National Minorities with no reservations. Attempts undertaken by the Lithuanian parliament to enact the relevant provisions have not yielded results. On the other hand, the controversial amendments to the Law on Education were adopted on March 17, 2011. According to Polish organizations operating in Lithuania new law restricts the right of minorities to receive education in their native language. These events were the impetus for the creation of the EFHR.

As a result of the efforts of the European Foundation of Human Rights, one of the world’s biggest organization for democracy, Freedom House, has changed its report Freedom in the World 2013. In the section on Lithuania the statement "The rights of ethnic minorities,(...), are legally protected" was removed. Instead of that, Freedom House underlined that discrimination against ethnic minorities remains a problem in Lithuania.

== Current activity ==
- Free legal advice to victims of discrimination, intolerance and other human rights abuses
- Free human rights workshops and lectures
- Educational outreach programs
- Media and the Internet monitoring
- Monitoring job advertisements
- English translations of articles. At the end of 2018 there were more than 3,206 articles published on media.efhr.eu.
- Disseminate of information on Legal Aid Center through leaflets in Polish, Lithuanian, Russian and English

== EFHR reports ==
- Alternative report prepared for the Committee on the Elimination of Racial Discrimination (2011);
- Alternative NGO Report on Lithuania’s Implementation of the Framework Convention for the Protection of National Minorities (2014);
- ”Observance of human rights in Lithuania for years 2012 – 2013” (2014);
- Alternative Report for the Committee on the Elimination of Racial Discrimination (2015);
- Alternative Report about the Framework Convention for the Protection of National Minorities in Lithuania (2018)

== EFHR and Erasmus+ ==
EFHR is coordinating, sending and hosting organization since 2013.

Completed projects:

- “Notice it! Human Rights in our daily life” – volunteer from Spain
- “Youth for human rights“ – volunteers from Poland and Hungary;
- “Promote diversity, promote human rights“ – volunteers from Poland and United Kingdom[
- "Sensitive communication of Human Rights"- intern form Portugal

== See also ==
- Ethnic minorities in Lithuania
- Electoral Action of Poles in Lithuania
- European Charter for Regional or Minority Languages
- Framework Convention for the Protection of National Minorities
- Lithuania–Poland relations
- Polish minority in Lithuania
- Russians in Lithuania - Baltic Russians
