= Dominik Semashko =

Belarusian activist

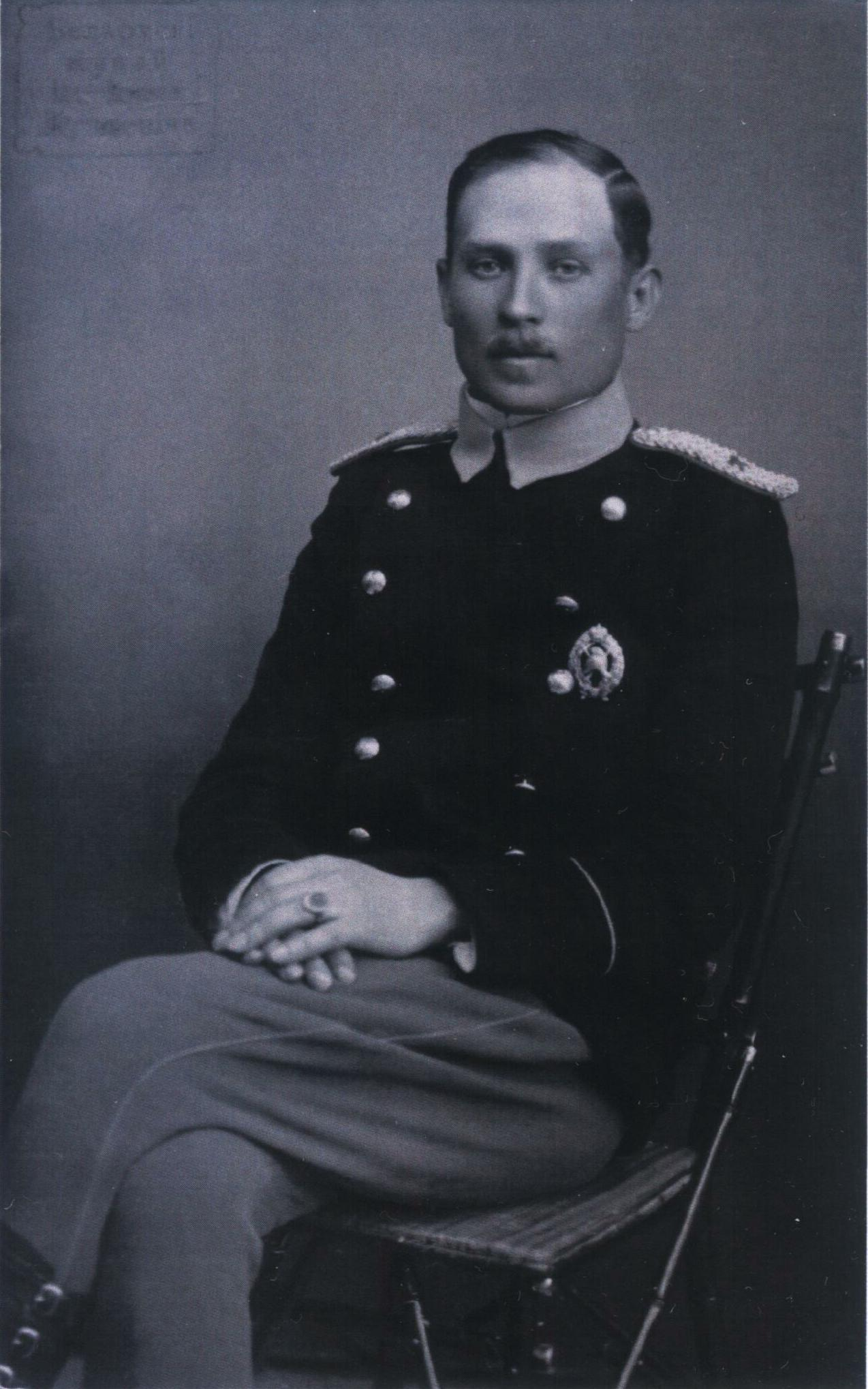
- Semashko in firefighter's uniform

Minister for Belarusian Affairs
- In office 19 June 1920 – 1 August 1922
- Prime Minister: Kazys Grinius; Ernestas Galvanauskas
- Preceded by: Jazep Varonka
- Succeeded by: Ernestas Galvanauskas (acting)

Personal details
- Born: 16 August 1878 Vilnius, Russian Empire
- Died: 27 November 1932 (aged 54) Kaunas, Lithuania
- Awards: Order of the Lithuanian Grand Duke Gediminas

Dominik Semashko (Belarusian: Дамінік Сямашка, lit. 'Daminik Siamaška', Lithuanian: Domininkas Siemaška; 16 August 1878 – 27 November 1932) was a Belarusian activist. In the 1890s, he joined the Polish Socialist Party and other socialist groups advocating workers' rights. The police forced him to flee to Switzerland where he received engineering education and firefighting training. During World War I, he was fire chief in Vilnius from 1915 to 1918. In 1918, he was elected to the Rada of the Belarusian Democratic Republic and then became part of the Council of Lithuania. Initially, he was a supporter of a union between Lithuania and Belarus along the lines of the old Grand Duchy of Lithuania but later became more aligned with Lithuania. He represented Lithuania at the Paris Peace Conference and during the negotiations of the Soviet–Lithuanian Peace Treaty. In 1920–1922, he was Minister for Belarusian Affairs. He then retired from politics and devoted his time to firefighting.

== Biography ==
Semashko was born into a family of poor nobles from Raseiniai. He was born in Vilnius though in his autobiography he noted Surdegis as his birth place. He studied at the Real Gymnasium in Vilnius but was expelled for anti-Tsarist activities after he joined the Polish Socialist Party. In 1895, he moved to Kamianske on the Dnieper river in Ukraine to work in a factory. There he joined a volunteer firefighter brigade and a union advocating for workers' rights. For that, he was searched by the Tsarist police and had to escape to Lviv in then Austria-Hungary in 1898. There he joined the workers' organization Borba (fight, struggle), was arrested by the police, and exiled to Switzerland. He completed firefighting courses in Biel/Bienne and a technical school in Winterthur in 1902. In 1903, he joined Polish socialists in London and helped them publish various revolutionary brochures in Belarusian.

He returned to the factory in Kamianske during the Russian Revolution of 1905. He again joined the volunteer fire brigade. He returned to Vilnius in 1911 and organized a fire brigade in Šnipiškės in 1914. Semashko rallied the men into a militia to protect the city from hooligans and fires when the Russian Imperial Army abandoned the city during the Great Retreat in mid-1915. He became the city's fire chief (brandmajor) and commanded both local and German Ober Ost firefighters during the fire. At the same time, he turned away from Polish political activists towards Belarusian and Lithuanian causes. He was a contributor to the Belarusian newspaper Homan and was elected to the Rada of the Belarusian Democratic Republic in January 1918. He participated in the declaration of independence of the Belarusian People's Republic and drafted plans for establishing a Belarusian university, named after Adam Mickiewicz, in Minsk. On 23 April 1918, he participated in discussions with the Council of Lithuania regarding the territory of Lithuania and Belarus after the war and ideas on resurrecting the old Grand Duchy of Lithuania.

On 27 November 1918, Semashko and five other Belarusians joined the Council of Lithuania. In January 1919, as a representative of the Belarusian minority, Semashko was sent by Lithuania to the Paris Peace Conference. His role at the conference became more prominent after a Belarusian delegation, led by Prime Minister Anton Luckievich, arrived in Paris in summer 1919. In mid-June 1919, Semashko issued a memorandum that unconditionally recognized the territories of the former Vilna and Grodno Governorates as Lithuanian. According to Tomasz Błaszczak, Semashko began to take an anti-Belarusian stance and came to fully support Lithuania's independence. In April 1920, he was sent as a representative of the Council of Lithuania to the negotiations of the Soviet–Lithuanian Peace Treaty. However, he played a minimal role and was quickly recalled to Kaunas. After the elections to the Constituent Assembly of Lithuania in May 1920, Jazep Varonka was replaced by more pro-Lithuanian Semashko as the Minister for Belarusian Affairs without portfolio. As the minister, he published weekly two-page Belarusian newsletter Pahonia (Пагоня, the Belarusian name of the Lithuanian coat of arms) from July to October 1920. Its circulation was 2,000 copies. Activities of the ministry were minimal and the Belarusians did not trust or support Semashko. He resigned in August 1922 but continued as acting minister until the cabinet change in February 1923. Lithuanians could not find a suitable replacement and the position was temporarily taken by Ernestas Galvanauskas, who at the same time was Prime Minister and Minister of Foreign Affairs. The last ministry employees were dismissed by the end of 1923.

After 1922, Semashko withdrew from politics and devoted his energy to firefighting. Notably, he did not join any Belarusian organizations. He established and briefly edited monthly journal Lietuvos gaisrininkas (Lithuanian Fireman) in 1923 and published a book on firefighting techniques in 1926. He was a special consultant on firefighting to the Ministry of the Interior from 1924 to his death. Semashko assisted in organizing firefighter units in Kaunas and elsewhere. For his efforts, he was awarded the Order of the Lithuanian Grand Duke Gediminas. He was also a freemason and a member of the Lithuania Lodge. He died in 1932 after getting an inflammation in his lungs.
