= Constituent Charter of the Belarusian People's Republic =

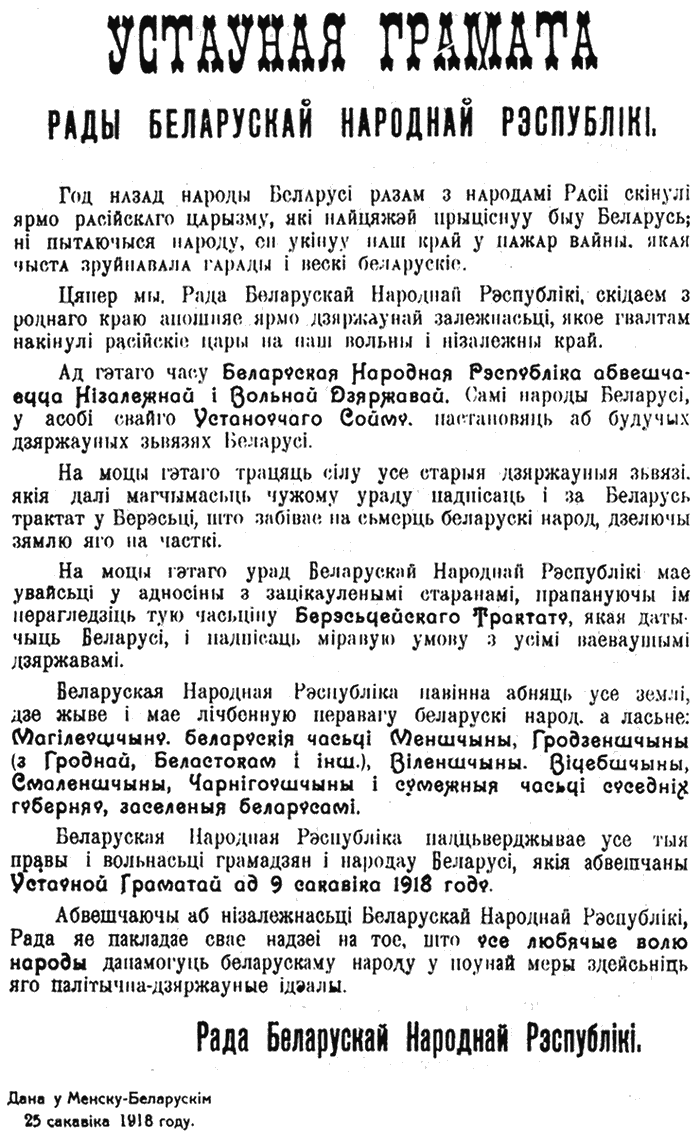
The Third Constituent Charter proclaimed an independent of Belarusian People's Republic.

The Constituent Charter of the Belarusian People's Republic (Belarusian: Устаўныя граматы БНР, Ustaŭnyja hramaty BNR) are documents adopted by the Executive Committee of the Council of the All-Belarusian Congress and the Council of the BNR in February and March 1918, which proclaimed the will of the Belarusian people regarding their national and state future.

== The First Constituent Charter ==
Adopted by the Executive Committee of the Council of the All-Belarusian Congress on February 21, 1918 in Minsk.

The First Constituent Charter called on the Belarusian people to exercise their right to "full self-determination" and national minorities to exercise national and personal autonomy. Referring to the right of peoples to self-determination, the authors of the charter argued that power in Belarus should be formed in accordance with the will of the peoples inhabiting the country. This principle must be implemented through democratic elections to the All-Belarusian Constituent Assembly.

== The Second Constituent Charter ==
Adopted by the Executive Committee of the All-Belarusian Congress on March 9, 1918 in Minsk.

The Belarusian People's Republic was proclaimed within the limits of the settlement and numerical superiority of the Belarusian people.

The rights and freedoms of citizens and peoples of the Belarusian People's Republic were proclaimed: freedom of speech, press, assembly, strikes, allies; freedom of conscience, inviolability of person and premises; the right of peoples to national and personal autonomy; equality of all languages of the peoples of Belarus. Private ownership of land was abolished, the transfer of land without redemption to those who worked on it was announced; forests, lakes and subsoil were declared state property. The maximum length of the working day was 8 hours.

== The Third Constituent Charter ==
Adopted by the BNR Council on March 25, 1918 in Minsk.

The Belarusian People's Republic was proclaimed an independent state.

The BNR Rada demanded to revise the Treaty of Brest-Litovsk. In the lands of the former Russian Empire, where the Belarusian people live and have a numerical advantage, a free, independent state was proclaimed; it included Mahilioŭ, Mensk, Viciebsk, Belarusian parts of Horadnia, Vilno, Smolensk, Chernihiv and neighboring governorate. The rights and freedoms of the citizens and peoples of Belarus, proclaimed by the Second Constituent Charter of March 9, 1918, were also confirmed.

== See also ==
- Fourth Constituent Charter

== Sources ==
- Ustaŭnyja hramaty BNR, Rada of the Belarusian Democratic Republic
