= Lithuanian Ministry for Belarusian Affairs =

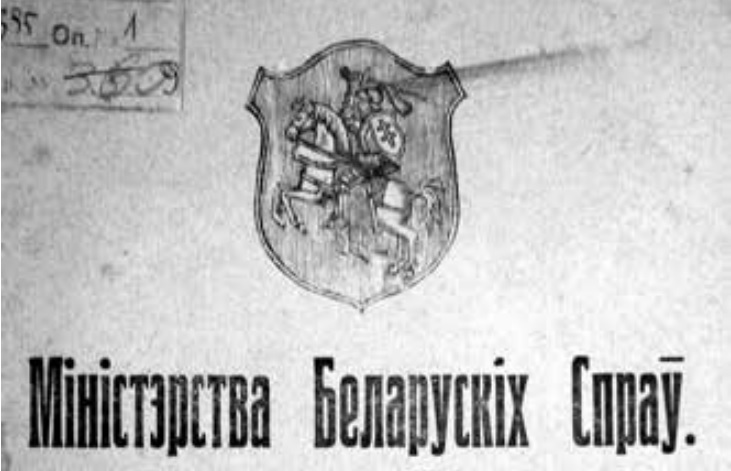
Lithuanian Ministry for Belarusian Affairs logo and name written in the Belarusian language

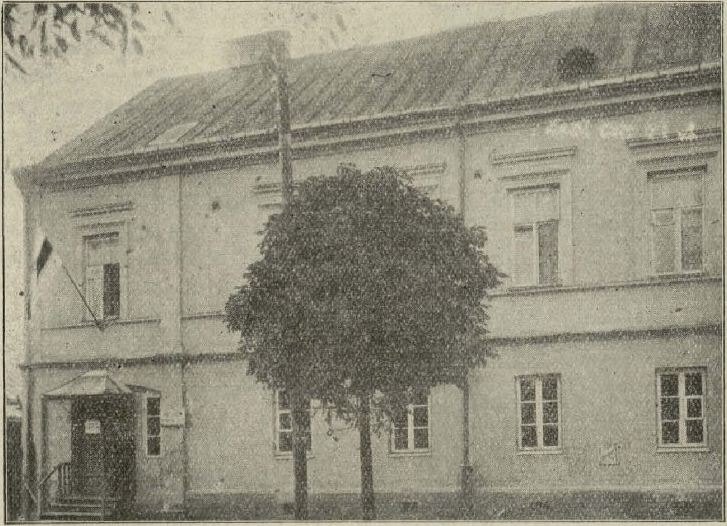
Ministry building in Kaunas, 1920

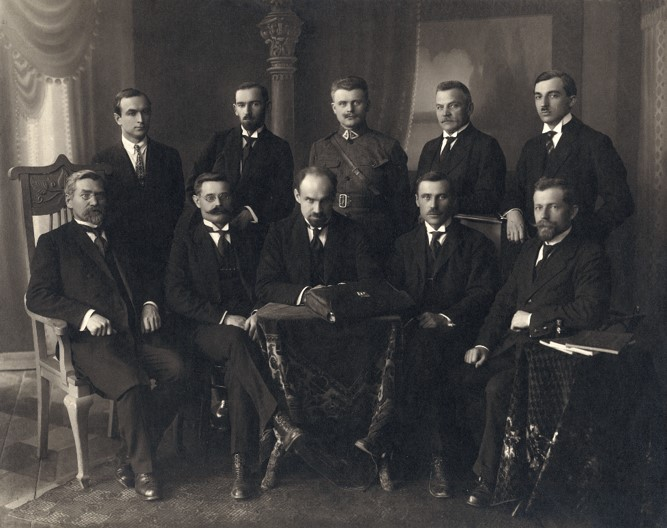
Minister for Belarusian Affairs Jazep Varonka (standing first from the right) with the Lithuanian ministers in Kaunas, between 1919 and 1920

The Ministry for Belarusian Affairs (Lithuanian: Lietuvos gudų reikalų ministerija, Belarusian: Міністэрства беларускіх спраў) was an interwar Lithuanian ministry that functioned from December 1918 to January 1924.

The Ministry was established in December 1918 to gain support of Belarusians in international negotiations over the borders of the newly independent Lithuania. However, the Lithuanian government did not support Belarusian autonomy and the ministry effectively competed with the Rada of the Belarusian Democratic Republic. Activities of the ministry were limited to publication of several books and two periodicals and other cultural work. The ministry was officially closed in January 1924.

The first Lithuanian President Antanas Smetona wrote that, following a successful liberation of the Polish-occupied Vilnius, the constitutional capital of Lithuania, the Lithuanians planned to expand further into the Belarusian territories (the former lands of the Grand Duchy of Lithuania) and considered granting autonomy to the Belarusian territories, as requested by the Belarusian side, therefore had kept the Lithuanian Ministry for Belarusian Affairs in force, moreover, in 1924 Smetona noted that there were a lot of pro-Lithuanian sympathies among the Belarusians and criticized the closing of the ministry.

The ministry used the coat of arms of Lithuania, including in its official correspondence.

== History ==
This ministry was established as a result of negotiations between leaders of the Belarusian People's Republic and the Council of Lithuania in November–December 1918. Lithuanians wanted to secure Belarusian support in the upcoming Paris Peace Conference over the borders of the new Lithuanian State. For the same reason, there was a Ministry for Jewish Affairs. As a result of the negotiations, six Belarusians were co-opted into the council on 27 November and the Ministry for Belarusian Affairs was established on 9 December. Jazep Varonka became the first minister without portfolio. In late December 1918, when Vilnius was under the threat of the Soviet westward offensive at the outbreak of the Lithuanian–Soviet War, the Ministry for Belarusian Affairs evacuated to Grodno while other Lithuanian government institutions evacuated to Kaunas. The ministry moved to Kaunas in spring 1919 when Grodno was captured during the Polish–Soviet War.

By spring 1919, Belarusian leaders became disillusioned with Lithuanian support. Belarusian Prime Minister Anton Luckievich sent Pyotra Krecheuski to negotiate with Lithuania regarding the liquidation of the Ministry for Belarusian Affairs and establishment of a diplomatic mission of the Belarusian People's Republic in Kaunas. Negotiations failed and Varonka remained minister. In late 1919, the Lithuanian government decided to reign in ministry's contacts with foreign powers, specifically the West Russian Volunteer Army and the Belarusian People's Republic. Several Belarusian couriers travelling from Berlin to Riga were arrested and Varonka resigned in protest on 3 January 1920. Government inspectors found no irregularities at the ministry and the couriers were soon released, but the ministry was essentially inactive from February to June 1920 when the new minister Dominik Semashko was appointed. He did not support Belarusian autonomy and thus was largely isolated from the community.

After Lithuania lost its capital Vilnius to the Żeligowski's Mutiny, the Rada of the Belarusian Democratic Republic signed a partnership treaty with Lithuania on 11 November 1920 and relocated to Kaunas. That brought two centres of Belarusians activities to Kaunas but they were not inclined to cooperate. Their competencies were divided: the ministry was in charge of Belarusian affairs inside the Lithuanian borders up to the demarcation line with Poland, while the Rada was in charge in Vilnius Region (i.e. between the demarcation line and the border drawn by the Soviet–Lithuanian Peace Treaty). That pushed the ministry into a secondary role as the Lithuanians cared more about the support Belarusians could provide in their territorial conflict with Poland over the Vilnius Region.

Semashko resigned in February 1923 when a new cabinet was sworn in. Lithuanians could not find a suitable replacement and Prime Minister Ernestas Galvanauskas also became acting Minister for Belarusian Affairs in the 8th cabinet that was appointed in June 1923. The last employees of the ministry were dismissed on 31 December 1923. The Ministry for Belarusian Affairs was officially liquidated on 19 January 1924. Its Jewish counterpart followed suit a couple of months later.

== Activities ==
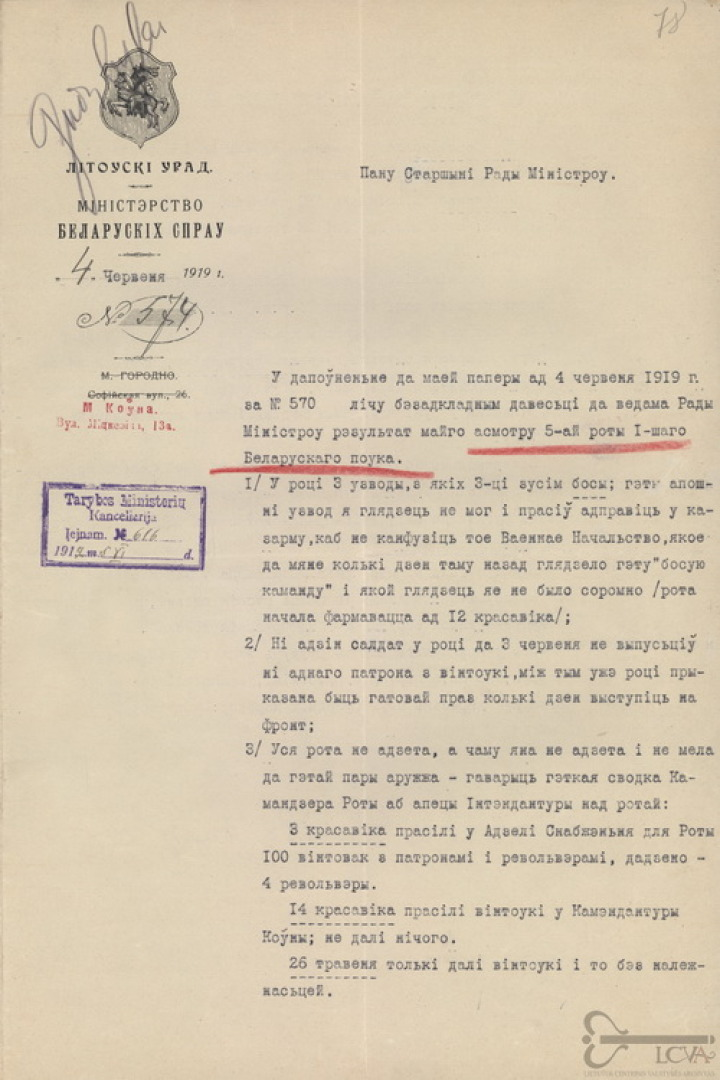
Lithuanian Ministry for Belarusian Affairs 4 June 1919 report sent to the Government of Lithuania about the 1st Belarusian Regiment military actions

Belarusians envisioned Lithuania that would include territories of the former Vilna and Grodno Governorates and where Belarusians would be treated not as an ethnic minority but as an equal. To that end, they sought autonomy in Belarusian-inhabited areas. The Lithuanian government did not support such aspirations and limited the activities of the Ministry for Belarusian Affairs. In January 1919, Jazep Varonka presented a plan for the ministry's functions that included education and social support. However, the government approved only seven out of 20 activities and provided funding of 28,400 German Papiermarks out of the requested 197,300. Thus, the ministry carried out mostly representative functions. Varonka sent notes to Germany and the Entente Powers protesting Polish and Soviet military actions in Belarusian-inhabited areas and met with American and French military attachés.

The formation of Belarusian military units within the Lithuanian Armed Forces was supported by minister Varonka, who, for example, on 3 February 1919 addressed the Ministry of National Defense of Lithuania and presented his proposals regarding the formation of Belarusian military units.

From September 1919 to February 1920, the ministry published illustrated Belarusian-language Journal of the Ministry for Belarusian Affairs (Belarusian: Часопісь Міністэрства беларускіх спраў, romanized: Časopiś Ministerstva bielaruskich spraŭ) which wrote on activities of the Lithuanian government, culture and education of Belarusians, biographies of prominent activists. The ministry published weekly two-page Belarusian newsletter Pahonia (which is the Belarusian name for the Lithuanian coat of arms) from July to October 1920. Its circulation was 2,000 copies. The newsletter reported on military actions and other news from Belarusian territories. The ministry also published several Belarusian language books, including two collections of poems by Francišak Bahuševič, translated fairy-tales by Hans Christian Andersen, primer by Jan Stankievič, several books by Vaclau Lastouski.

After the resignation of Semashko, Klawdziy Duzh-Dushewski continued cultural activities of the ministry and organized a six-week training on Lithuanian and Belarusian languages. When the ministry was closed, the publication of Belarusian books was taken over by Lastouski and Duzh-Dushewski.

== Ministers ==
List of ministers:

- Jazep Varonka from 9 December 1918 to 3 January 1920 (resigned)
- Dominik Semashko from 19 June 1920 to 1 August 1922, continued as acting minister until 22 February 1923
- Ernestas Galvanauskas acting from 29 June 1923 to 19 January 1924 (at the same time also Prime Minister and Minister for Foreign Affairs)

== See also ==
- List of governments of Lithuania (1918–40)
- Belarusians in Lithuania
- Lithuanian Ministry for Jewish Affairs

== Bibliography ==
- Surgailis, Gintautas (2020). Lietuvos kariuomenės gudų kariniai daliniai 1918–1923 m. (PDF) (in Lithuanian). Vilnius: General Jonas Žemaitis Military Academy of Lithuania. ISBN 978-609-8277-00-5.
