= Belarusians in Lithuania =

Ethnic group in Lithuania

Total population
- Ethnic Belarusians: 28,183 (2021 census); Citizens of Belarus: 53,739 (April 2025)

Regions with significant populations
- Vilnius, Visaginas, Šalčininkai District

Languages
- Russian, Belarusian (incl. simple speech), Lithuanian, Polish

Religion
- Roman Catholicism (49.6%), Eastern Orthodoxy (32.3%)

Related ethnic groups
- Belarusians, Poles in Lithuania, Lithuanians

The Belarusian minority in Lithuania (Belarusian: Беларусы Літвы; Lithuanian: Lietuvos baltarusiai) is one of the ethnic minorities in Lithuania.

The community is historically divided into two distinct groups: the so-called locals inhabiting the Vilnius and Šalčininkai districts, and the modern diaspora formed by migration during the Soviet era and the recent wave of political and economic emigrants following the 2020–2021 Belarusian protests.

According to the 2021 census, there were 28,183 ethnic Belarusians in Lithuania (1.0% of the population), making them the third-largest ethnic group after Lithuanians and Poles. However, the number of Belarusian citizens residing in the country surged after 2020, reaching over 62,000 in 2024 before declining to approximately 53,700 by April 2025.

== History ==
=== Grand Duchy of Lithuania and Russian Empire ===
Since the times of the Grand Duchy of Lithuania until World War I, the socio-economic, national, and cultural development of Belarusians and Lithuanians took place within a unified state space. The main Belarusian center here was historically Vilnius, where common state and cultural institutions existed, including Vilnius University and the Vilnius Brotherhood printing house. After the partitions of Poland–Lithuania by the Russian Empire at the end of the 18th century, Belarusians and Lithuanians participated together in the national liberation movement (the Kościuszko Uprising of 1794, the Philomaths and Philarets societies, the activities of Szymon Konarski and Franz Savitch, the November Uprising of 1830–31, and the January Uprising of 1863–64).

According to the Russian Empire census of 1897, 70,300 Belarusians lived on the territory of Vilnius Governorate (which included some parts now in Belarus), where they made up 56% of the population. In the early 20th century, various Belarusian organizations operated in Vilnius, such as the Vilnius Art and Industrial Society, the Nasha Niva publishing house, the Belarusian Publishing Society (active 1919–1930), the Belarusian Music and Drama Circle, and the Belarusian Teachers' Union. Newspapers like Nasha Dolya and Nasha Niva were published there.

=== World War I and Interwar Period ===
During World War I, after the German occupation of Lithuania in 1915, the Belarusian Club was organized in Vilnius, and the Belarusian Hramada in Kaunas. With the proclamation of the restoration of Lithuanian independence on 16 February 1918, the activities of Belarusian organizations in the German-occupied territories of Belarus and Lithuania were coordinated by the Vilnius Belarusian Rada (VBR). After the denunciation of the Treaty of Brest-Litovsk in 1918, representatives of the VBR joined the Council of Lithuania, and the Lithuanian Ministry for Belarusian Affairs was created.

In December 1918, the government of the Belarusian People's Republic (BPR) was located in Vilnius, and from late 1920 to October 1923, in Kaunas. The Belarusian Diplomatic Mission was also located there in 1919–1923. In June 1919, the 1st and 2nd Separate Belarusian Companies were formed in Kaunas, which participated together with Lithuanian units in battles against Soviet and Polish troops. In November 1919, both companies were united into the Belarusian Battalion. In April 1920, it was transformed into the Belarusian Separate Company, and in December 1920, back into the Belarusian Separate Battalion, which until 1923 waged an anti-Polish partisan war in Western Belarus.

In October 1920, troops of the Polish general Lucjan Żeligowski seized Vilnius and the Vilnius Region (see Republic of Central Lithuania), and in early 1922, the Sejm approved their incorporation into Poland as the Wilno Voivodeship. From that time until the end of 1939, Vilnius was the social, educational, and cultural center of Western Belarus. In 1923–24, the "Belarusian Riflemen's Union" cooperated with the Lithuanian side in the struggle against Poland. In the early 1920s, a foreign group of the Belarusian Party of Socialist Revolutionaries, the Belarusian Assembly, the Belarusian Brotherhood, and others operated in Kaunas; a significant number of Belarusian-language periodicals were published in Lithuania.

After the abolition of the Ministry of Belarusian Affairs in Lithuania (1923), whose successor the Belarusian Center (Kaunas) tried to become, public activity of Belarusians in Lithuania decreased due to the unfavorable attitude of Lithuanian authorities towards Belarusian national problems; by the end of the 1920s, almost all Belarusian schools there were closed. In the 1930s, the national-cultural life of Belarusians in Lithuania became active again (see Belarusian Cultural and Educational Society in Kaunas), and the Kaunas Belarusian Center was restored.

=== World War II and Soviet Period ===
At the beginning of World War II, when Vilnius and the Vilnius Region were transferred to Lithuania (October 1939), the Vilnius Belarusian Scientific Society and the Belarusian Student Union ceased their activities. During the German occupation of Lithuania during World War II, the Vilnius Belarusian Gymnasium, the Belarusian Teachers' Seminary, and the Vilnius Belarusian Museum (closed in 1945) were still active, and the newspaper Bielaruski holas (ed. Frantsishak Alyakhnovich) was published.

After the Soviet re-occupation of Lithuania in 1944, part of the Belarusians of the Vilnius Region resettled in Poland based on the Lithuanian-Polish agreement on the mutual evacuation of the population of 22 September 1944. From 1945, Belarusians from the BSSR arrived in Lithuania for recruitment, construction projects, etc. Their number increased from 30,000 in 1959 to 63,000 in 1989; however, they had practically no organized national life. Piotra Sierhijevič, Zośka Vieras, Liavon Luckievič, Janka Šutovič, and others continued their activities in Vilnius.

The activation of public life of the Belarusian national minority in Lithuania began during the liberalization of socio-political life in the USSR (second half of the 1980s), when a number of Belarusian cultural and educational organizations emerged, including "Siabryna". Since 1989, Belarusian programs have been broadcast on radio and television in Lithuania.

=== Independent Lithuania ===
After the declaration of independence of Lithuania and Belarus and the collapse of the USSR in 1991–96, more than 7,600 Belarusians returned from Lithuania to the Republic of Belarus, and 3,800 of its residents moved to Lithuania from Belarus. According to Lithuanian statistical data, in the mid-1990s, more than 50,000 Belarusians lived in Lithuania (mainly in the Vilnius Region) (1.5% of the country's population). In early 1998, 15 Belarusian organizations conducted cultural and educational work in Lithuania (in Vilnius, Druskininkai, Visaginas, Šalčininkai, Švenčionys, etc.), including the Society of Belarusian Culture and the Society of the Belarusian Language. Since 1993, the Francysk Skaryna Gymnasium has been operating in Vilnius. Exhibitions of works by Belarusian artists, festivals of Belarusian songs are held in Visaginas and other cities of Lithuania, and Belarusian-language periodicals are published.

The provision of conditions for the free development of the native language, preservation of traditions, performance of religious rites, and protection of the legal rights of Belarusian citizens in Lithuania is provided for by the Treaty on Good Neighborliness and Cooperation between Belarus and Lithuania (1995), the Belarusian-Lithuanian intergovernmental agreement on the protection of their citizens on the territory of both countries (1996), on the guarantee of their rights in the field of pension provision (1994), and others.

=== Post-2020 Migration (The "New Diaspora") ===
Following the fraudulent 2020 Belarusian presidential election and the subsequent brutal crackdown on protests, Lithuania became a primary destination for Belarusian political refugees. This wave of migration was fundamentally different from the Soviet-era labor migration, as it consisted largely of political activists, journalists, IT professionals, and businesses relocating to safety.

Major Belarusian tech companies, such as Wargaming, EPAM Systems, and Flo Health, relocated thousands of employees to Vilnius. By early 2023, the number of Belarusian citizens in Lithuania had doubled compared to 2020.

However, the situation changed after the Russian invasion of Ukraine in 2022. While Lithuania continued to support the Belarusian democratic opposition led by Sviatlana Tsikhanouskaya (who is based in Vilnius), public sentiment and government policy towards ordinary Belarusians became more restrictive. In 2023–2024, Lithuanian authorities designated over 2,000 Belarusians as threats to national security (often due to prior service in the Belarusian army or state structures), resulting in the revocation of residence permits.

Tensions were further inflamed by the rise of Litvinism—a fringe pseudo-historical theory claiming that the Grand Duchy of Lithuania was exclusively Belarusian, perceived by Lithuanian society as a threat to its heritage and history. This led to scepticism with regards to some parts of the diaspora, exemplified by the pressure on the Belarusian-owned bar "Pahonia" in Vilnius, which was forced to rebrand as "Poliklinika" in 2025 due to hostility.

As of April 1, 2025, the number of Belarusian citizens with valid residence permits in Lithuania stood at 53,739, a decrease of nearly 15% compared to the previous year. This decline is attributed to stricter migration laws, including proposals to revoke permits for frequent travel to Belarus, which heavily affects the transport sector (around 36,000 Belarusians work as truck drivers in Lithuania).

== Identity and Language ==
The identity of the autochthonous Slavic population in southeastern Lithuania is complex. Ethnologist Yury Vnukovich defines the situation in the Vilnius Region as an "ethnic anomaly." While local Lithuanians are identified by their language, for the local Slavic speakers, their everyday language is not a primary marker of ethnicity.

The vernacular spoken by this group is known as prostaya mova ("simple speech"), an uncodified dialect with a Belarusian linguistic base and significant borrowings from Polish, Russian, and Lithuanian. Polish linguist Mirosław Jankowiak attested that many inhabitants who declare Polish nationality speak this Belarusian dialect.

However, speakers of prostaya mova often identify as Poles. Research indicates that religion serves as the primary boundary marker: the local population strictly categorizes Catholics as Poles and Orthodox believers as Belarusians (or Russians).

According to the 2011 census, the linguistic situation among ethnic Belarusians in Lithuania was as follows:

- Russian as mother tongue: 56.3%
- Belarusian as mother tongue: 18.4%
- Polish: 9.3%
- Lithuanian: 5.2%

== Demographics ==
The number of ethnic Belarusians has been steadily declining since the collapse of the USSR due to assimilation and emigration, while the number of Belarusian citizens (migrants) has fluctuated.

Ethnic Belarusians in Lithuania (Census data):

Year	Population	% of total
1959	30,256	1.11%
1989	63,169	1.71%
2001	42,866	1.23%
2011	36,227	1.19%
2021	28,183	1.01%

== Education and Culture ==
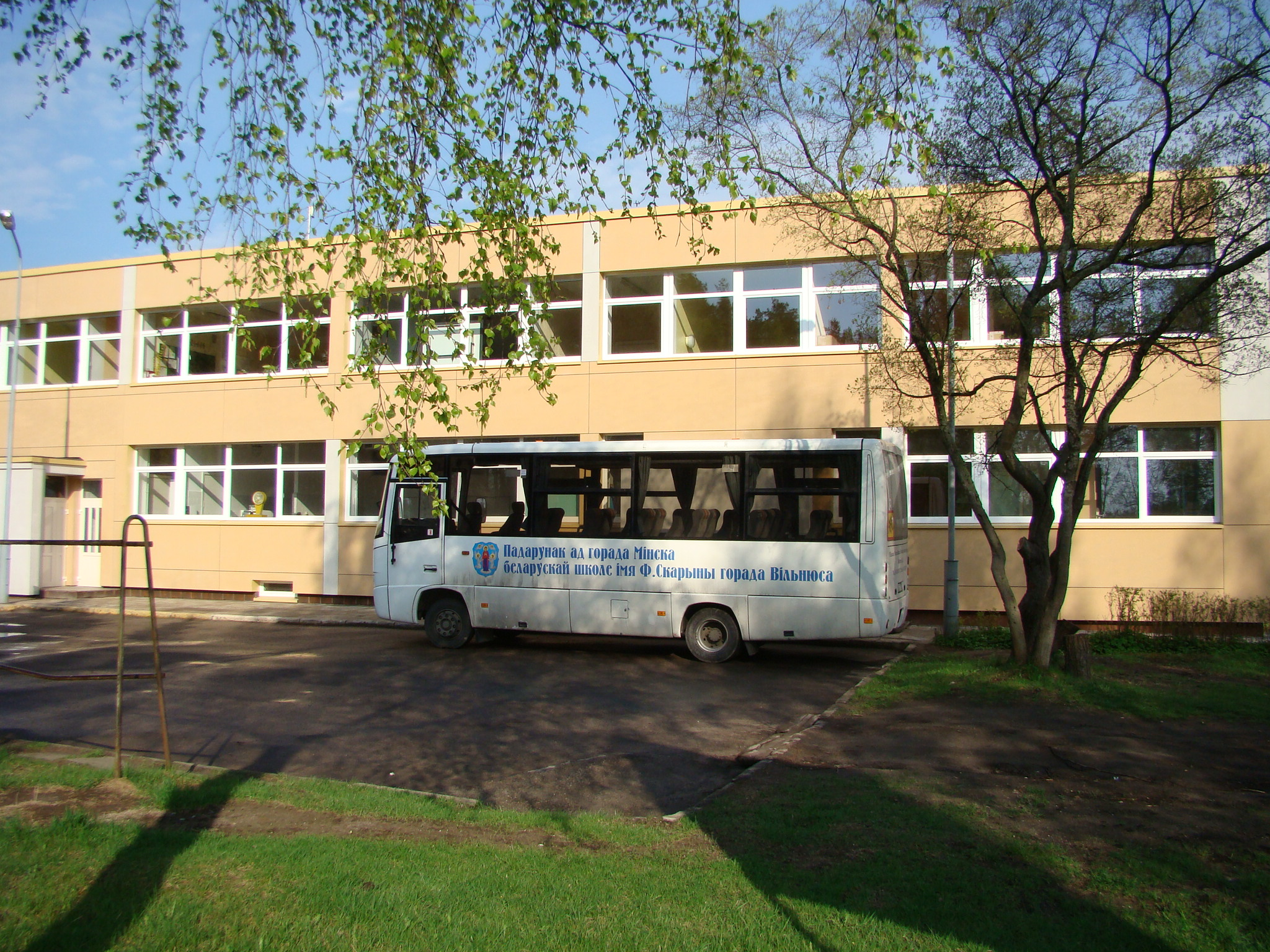
Francysk Skaryna Gymnasium in Vilnius

There are several organizations aimed at preserving Belarusian culture, united under the Association of Belarusian Public Organizations in Lithuania. Vilnius has once again become a major center for Belarusian culture and civil society in exile.

- Education: The Francysk Skaryna Gymnasium in Vilnius is the only school with Belarusian as the language of instruction (12-year curriculum). There is also a Sunday school in Klaipėda.
- Organizations: Dozens of NGOs operate in Lithuania, including the Belarusian House (Vilniaus St. 20), which hosts the Vilnius Belarusian Museum named after Ivan Luckievič, a library, and a Sunday school. Other prominent organizations include the Razam foundation and Dapamoha, which assist refugees.
- Media: Major independent Belarusian media outlets, such as Nasha Niva, operate from Vilnius after being banned in Belarus.
- Education: Since 2005, the European Humanities University (EHU), a Belarusian university in exile, has been operating in Vilnius, offering degrees in humanities and social sciences. There are also informal education initiatives like the Aktyunym być fajna (It's cool to be active) space.
- Religion: Religious services in the Belarusian language are held at St. Bartholomew's Church, Vilnius (Roman Catholic).

Funding: Under Lithuanian law, residents can allocate 1.2% of their income tax to NGOs. In 2024, Belarusians in Lithuania donated over €15,000 to Nasha Niva and nearly €10,000 to the Belarusian House via this mechanism.

== Notable people ==
- Frantsishak Alyakhnovich (1883–1944), writer and playwright
- Klawdziy Duzh-Dushewski (1891–1959), architect, creator of the White-red-white flag
- Vacłaŭ Łastoŭski (1883–1938), historian and politician, Prime Minister of the Belarusian People's Republic
- Ivan Łuckievič (1881–1919), leading figure of the Belarusian independence movement, founder of the Vilnius Belarusian Museum
- Anton Łuckievič (1884–1942), politician and publicist, Prime Minister of the BPR
- Natallia Arsiennieva (1903–1997), poet
- Piotra Sierhijevič (1900–1984), painter
- Branislaw Tarashkyevich (1892–1938), linguist
- Zoska Veras (1892–1991), writer and cultural activist

== See also ==
- Belarus–Lithuania relations
- Lithuanians in Belarus
- Poles in Lithuania
- Prostaya mova
- Tutejszy

== Bibliography ==
- Пашкоў, Г. П., ed. (1999). "Літва". Беларуская энцыклапедыя: У 18 т. Т. 9: Кулібін — Малаіта [Belarusian Encyclopedia: In 18 Vol. Vol. 9: Kulibin — Malaita] (in Belarusian). Мінск: БелЭн. ISBN 985-11-0155-9.
- Внуковіч, Ю. (2023). Маркеры этнічнай ідэнтычнасці жыхароў Віленшчыны (па матэрыялах палявых этнаграфічных экспедыцый пачатку ХХІ ст.) [Markers of the Ethnic Identity of the Inhabitants of Vilnius Region (on the Material of Ethnographic Field Expeditions of the Beginning of the 21st Century)]. Studia Białorutenistyczne (in Belarusian). 17: 65–87. doi:10.17951/sb.2023.17.65-87.
- Беларускае замежжа = Белорусское зарубежье [Belarusian Diaspora] (in Belarusian). Мінск: Беларуская Энцыклапедыя. 2010. p. 479. ISBN 978-985-11-0534-8.
