= Lithuanian Ministry for Jewish Affairs =

Government ministry of Lithuania

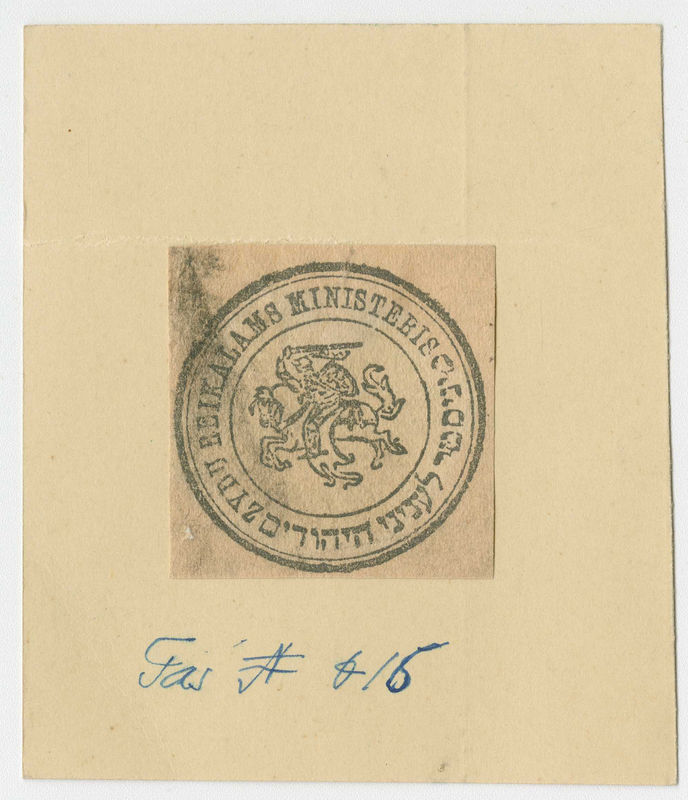
Seal of the Minister for Jewish Affairs, 1920s

The Ministry for Jewish Affairs (Lithuanian: Lietuvos žydų reikalų ministerija) was an interwar Lithuanian government portfolio.

This ministry was established as a result of bargaining between the Jewish community leaders and the Lithuanian government to gain the support of the latter in the peace conference negotiations over the boundaries of the new Lithuanian State. For the same reason, there was a Ministry for Belarusian Affairs. The portfolio was abolished on March 19, 1924.

List of incumbents

- Jakub Wygodzki from November 11, 1918, to April 12, 1919
- Max Soloveitchik from April 12, 1919, to April 1922 (resignation)
- Julius Brutzkus from April 1922 to February 22, 1923
- Bernard Naftal Friedman from February 22, 1923, to June 29, 1923
- Simon Yakovlevich Rosenbaum from June 29, 1923, till his resignation on February 12, 1924

== See also ==
- Ethnic minorities in Lithuania
- Lithuanian Ministry for Belarusian Affairs
