= National Archives of Belarus =

Нацыянальны гістарычны архіў Беларусі
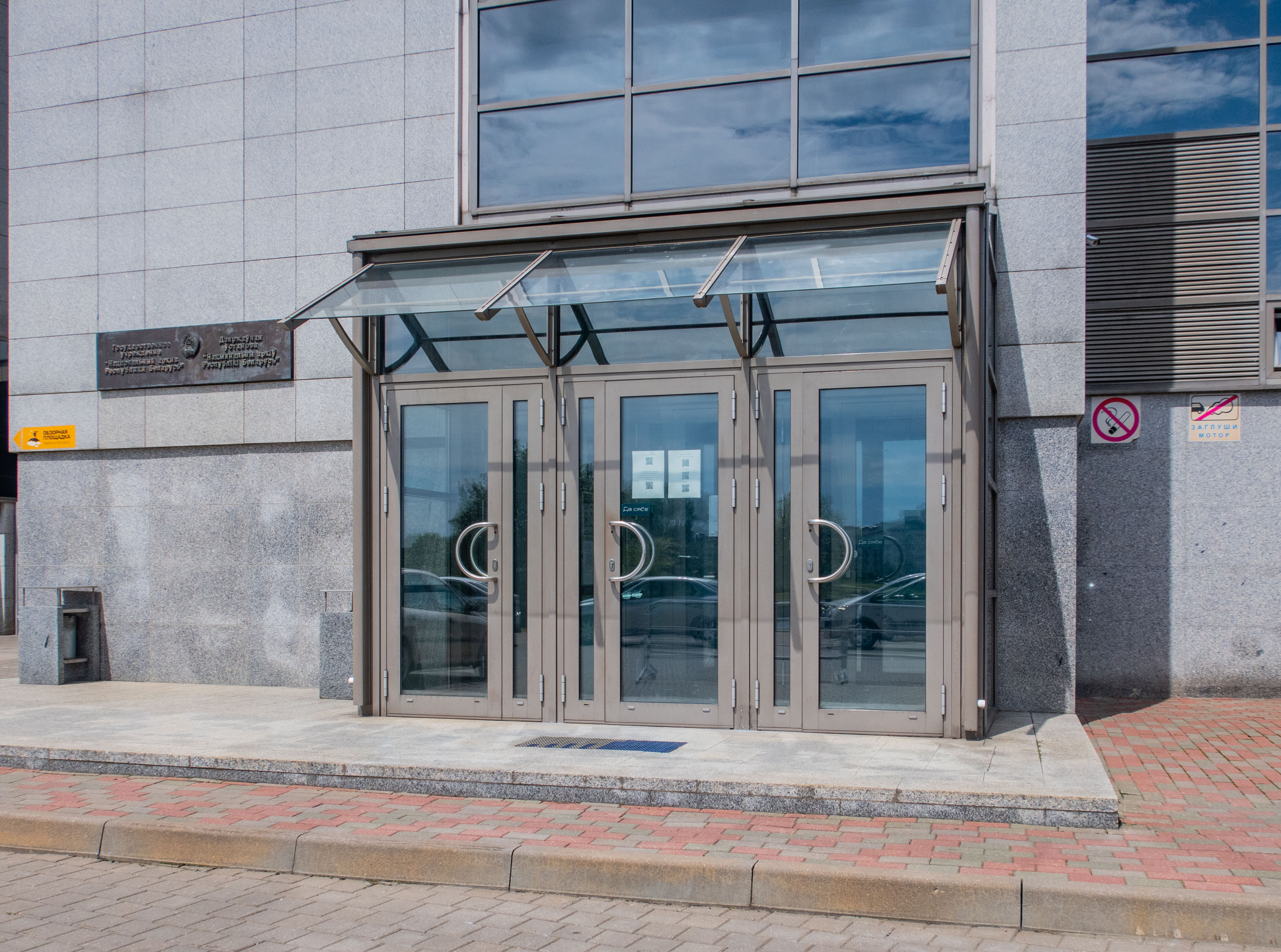
- Main entrance
- Interactive map of Нацыянальны гістарычны архіў Беларусі
- 53.919572298837714°N 27.557190433036038°E
- Alternative names: National Archives of Belarus, NARB
- Location: Minsk, Belarus
- Period covered: 20th Century
- Website: http://www.narb.by/eng

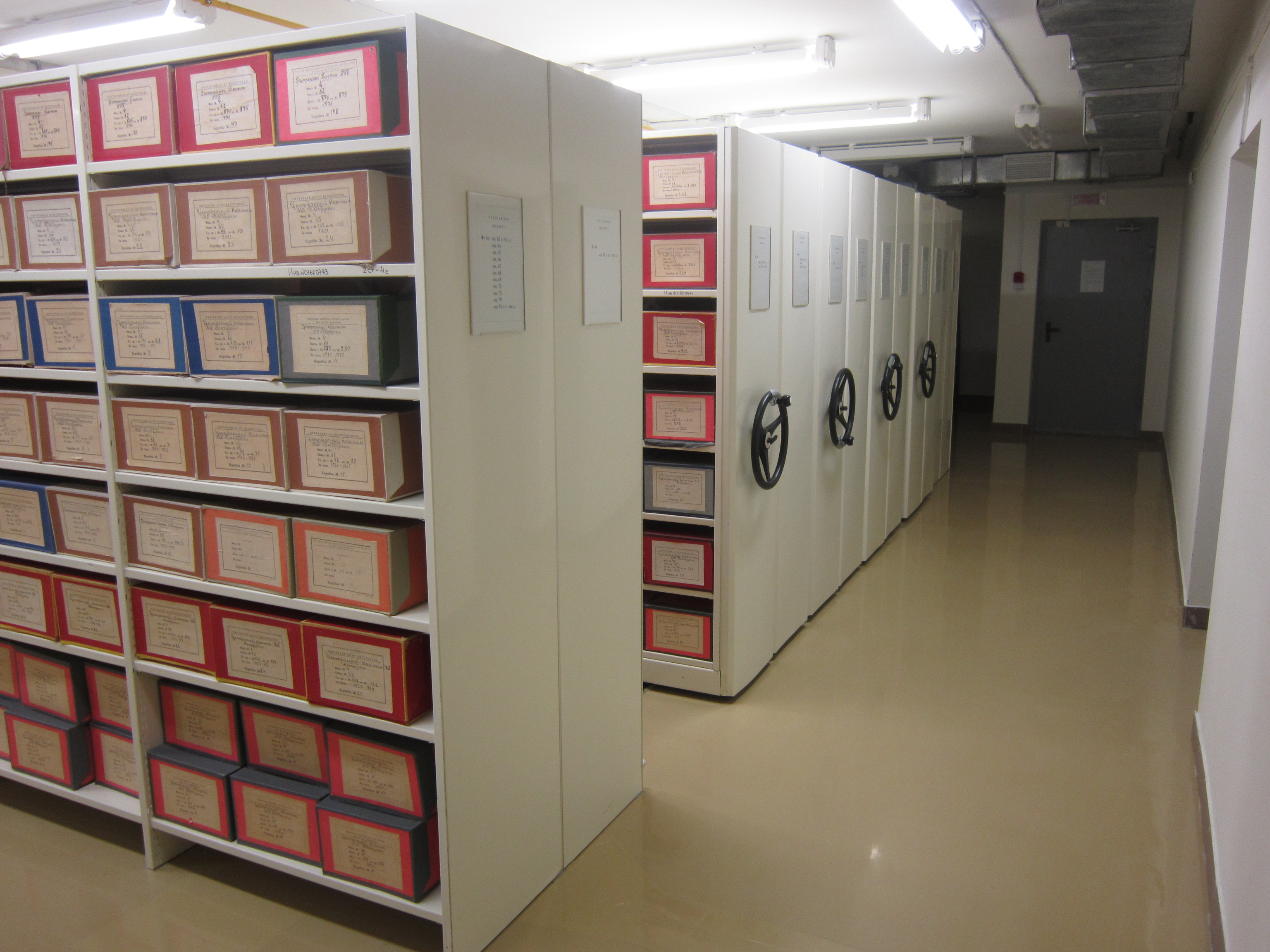
In the storage

The National Archives of Belarus (Belarusian: Нацыянальны гістарычны архіў Беларусі, romanized: Natsyyanal'ny histarychny arkhiw Belarusi; Russian: Национальный архив Республики Беларусь, romanized: Natsional'nyy arkhiv Respubliki Belarus') are located in Minsk. It is the largest repository of documents on the Belarusian history of the 20th century. The archive is an institution of the archival industry that provides the storage of documents of the National Archival Fund of the Republic of Belarus.

== History ==
Between 1922 and 1926, the formation of the funds of the Central Archive of the October Revolution began. Documents of 61 institutions (mainly disbanded military units and Belarusian national organizations) as well as documents from cooperative and trade union organizations were deposited. The archive is located in the old Church of the Holy Spirit, a former male Orthodox monastery.

On May 28, 1927, the Central Executive Committee and the Council of People's Commissars of the Byelorussian SSR approved by law the creation of the Central Archive of the October Revolution of the BSSR. The tasks of the CAOR of the BSSR included the storage of documents of the central, state, professional, cooperative, and public organizations and institution of Belarus that had been operating since the February Revolution of 1917.

== See also ==
- List of national archives
