= Bernardas Fridmanas =

Lithuanian lawyer, judge, journalist and politician

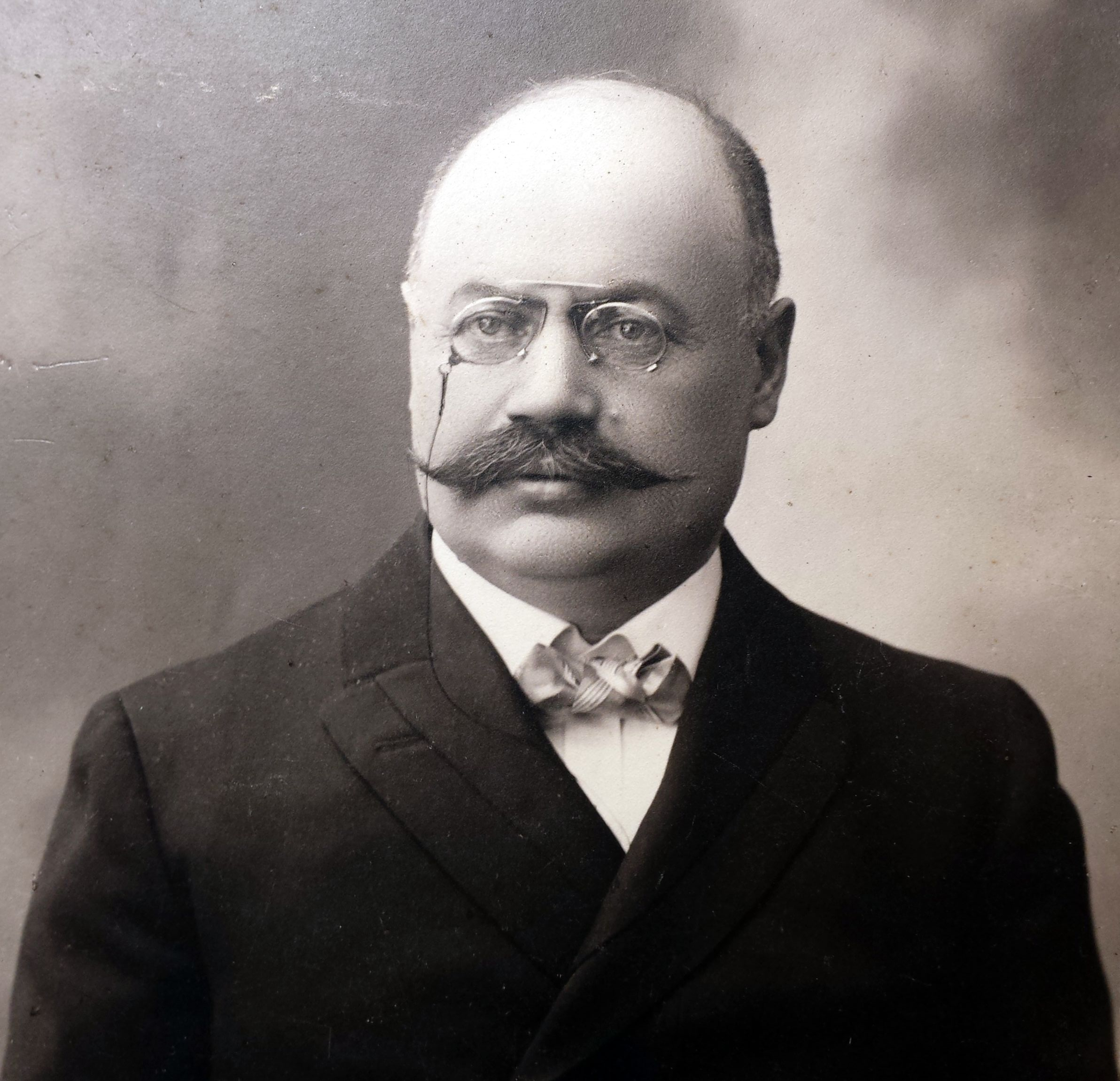
Bernardas Fridmanas

Bernardas Fridmanas or Bernard Naftal Friedman (1 October 1859 in Panevėžys, Russian Empire – 22 October 1939) was a Lithuanian Jewish lawyer, judge, journalist, politician and an activist of the Jewish minority. He served as the Minister of Jewish Affairs for Lithuania in 1923.

== Biography ==
He worked as a journalist in the Vilnius Gazette, Tiesa and Lietuva. In 1878–1886, he worked as a court clerk at the magistrate of Šiauliai, then up to the First World War, he practiced as a lawyer in Biržai and Panevėžys. After the war, he served as a justice of the peace in Biržai and Utena.

In independent Lithuania, he became a judge of the district court in Kaunas in 1925 served a similar function in Panevėžys. From February to June 1923, he was the Minister of Jewish Affairs in the government of Prime Minister Ernestas Galvanauskas.
