= Voskhod (magazine) =

Jewish magazine in Russian

Voskhod (Russian: Восход, IPA: [vɐˈsxot] , lit. 'sunrise') was a monthly Russian-Jewish periodical in the Russian Empire. It was published in St. Petersburg from 1881 to 1906. The magazine was a product of the Haskalah movement.

The circulation of Voskhod was just 950 copies in its first year. It increased to 4,397 copies in 1895.
