= Simon Rosenbaum (minister) =

Lithuanian politician

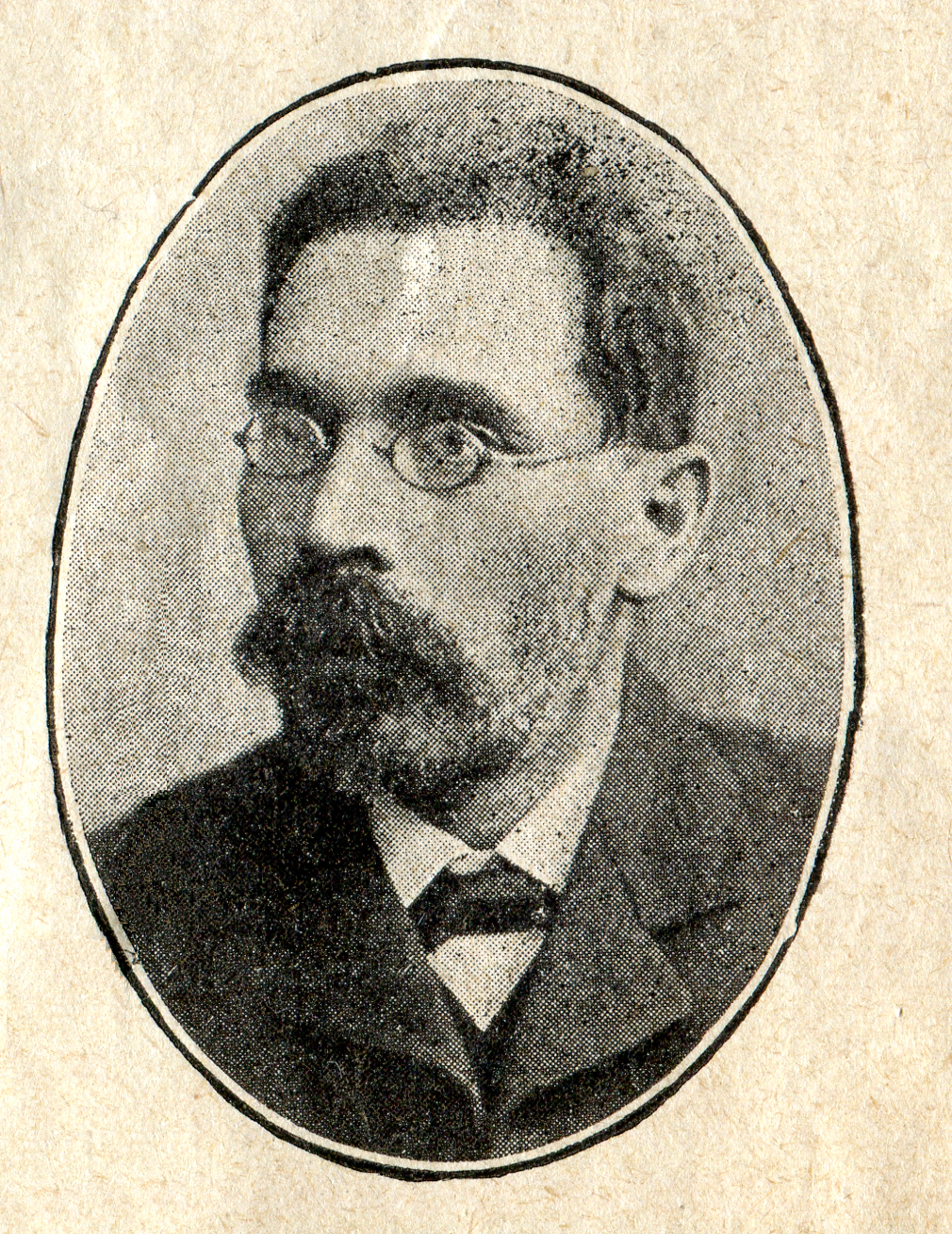
- Rosenbaum in 1906

Lithuanian Minister for Jewish Affairs
- In office June 29, 1923 – February 12, 1924

Personal details
- Born: 1860 Pinsk, Russian Empire
- Died: 1934 (aged 73–74) Tel Aviv, Palestine, United Kingdom
- Occupation: Politician; Attorney; Jewish activist

Simon Yakovlevich Rosenbaum (Семён Я́ковлевич Розенба́ум; 1860–1934) was a Jewish activist and attorney, member of the First State Duma of the Russian Empire in 1906–1907, Lithuanian Minister for Jewish Affairs from June 29, 1923 to his resignation on February 12, 1924 and Lithuanian consul in Palestine.
