= Jazep Varonka =

Belarusian politician

- Язэп Варонка
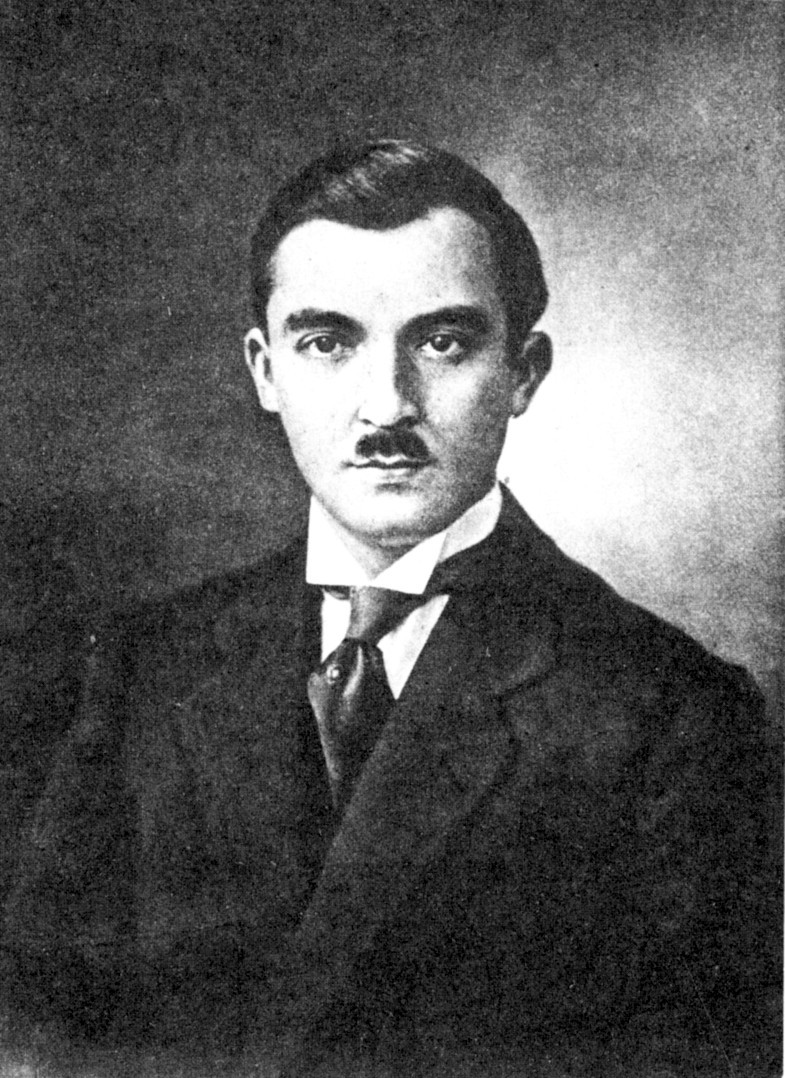

Chairmen of the People's Secretariat of the Belarusian Democratic Republic
- In office 21 February 1918 – May 1918
- Preceded by: Position established
- Succeeded by: Raman Skirmunt and Jan Sierada

Personal details
- Born: 4 April 1891 Sokółka County, Grodno Governorate, Russian Empire (present-day Poland)
- Died: 4 June 1952 (aged 61) Chicago, Illinois, U.S.
- Party: Belarusian Socialist Assembly

Jazep Jakaŭlevič Varonka (Note: Belarusian: Язэп Якаўлевіч Варонка; Russian: Иосиф Яковлевич Воронко, romanized: Iosif Yakovlevich Voronko) (4 April 1891 – 4 June 1952) was the first Chairman of the People's Secretariat (i.e. head of government) of the Belarusian Democratic Republic from 21 February to May 1918.

== Biography ==
Varonka was born in Sokółka County, Grodno Governorate on 4 April 1891. From 1909 to 1914, Varonka studied at the Saint Petersburg State University and published various Belarusian and Russian newspapers. In 1917, he joined the Belarusian Socialist Assembly and co-initiated the First All-Belarusian Congress. From 21 February to May 1918 he was the first Chairman of the People's Secretariat (i.e. Prime Minister) of the Belarusian Democratic Republic. He was succeeded by Jan Sierada. From 19 April, he was also Minister of Foreign Affairs. When Soviet Russia began its westward offensive of 1918–19 and captured Minsk, the government of the Belarusian Democratic Republic went into exile.

Varonka moved to Vilnius, where he established contacts with the Lithuanian government, which at the outbreak of the Lithuanian–Soviet War evacuated to Kaunas. When the Lithuanian Ministry for Belarusian Affairs was established on 9 December 1918, Varonka was appointed as the first minister. On 4 April 1919, Varonka and two other Belarusians were co-opted to the Council of Lithuania. After the elections to the Constituent Assembly of Lithuania in May 1920, Varonka was replaced by more pro-Lithuanian Dominik Semashko as the minister.

Varonka edited numerous Belarusian and Russian language newspapers, wrote many political and historical essays, actively participated in Belarusian cultural life. In 1923, he emigrated to Chicago, United States and began publishing the first Belarusian newspaper in the United States, Beloruskaia Tribuna (1926). Varonka started a weekly radio program in Chicago in Belarusian and Russian in the late twenties. After World War II, he became one of the founders of the Belarusian-American Association. He died in Chicago on 4 June 1952 and was buried at Elmwood Cemetery (River Grove, Illinois).
