= List of members of the Council of Lithuania =

The Council of Lithuania was originally elected in September 1917 by Vilnius Conference. The original 20 members of the council became signatories of the Act of Independence of Lithuania on 16 February 1918. Beginning in July 1918, the council coopted other members, including representatives of national minorities (three Jewish and nine Belarusian representatives). In total, 51 men were members of the council. The council was replaced by the Constituent Assembly of Lithuania that convened on 15 May 1920.

== Members ==
| # | Name | Date joined | Date left | How they became a member |
|---|---|---|---|---|
| 1 | Jurgis Alekna | 13 July 1918 | | Coopted by the Council of Lithuania |
| 2 | Danielius Alseika | 5 December 1918 | 1 January 1919 | Coopted by the Council of Lithuania |
| 3 | Saliamonas Banaitis | 21 September 1917 | | Elected at Vilnius Conference |
| 4 | Jonas Basanavičius | 21 September 1917 | | Elected at Vilnius Conference |
| 5 | Konstantin Beletskiy | 4 April 1919 | | Coopted Belarusian representative from Hrodna |
| 6 | Mykolas Biržiška | 21 September 1917 | | Elected at Vilnius Conference |
| 7 | Kazimieras Bizauskas | 21 September 1917 | | Elected at Vilnius Conference |
| 8 | Liudvikas Brokas | 22 January 1919 | | Elected at the Second Conference of the State of Lithuania |
| 9 | Voldemaras Čarneckis | 27 November 1918 | | Coopted by the Council of Lithuania |
| 10 | Pranas Dovydaitis | 21 September 1917 | | Elected at Vilnius Conference |
| 11 | Eliziejus Draugelis | 13 July 1918 | | Coopted by the Council of Lithuania |
| 12 | Kazimir Falkievič | 27 November 1918 | | Coopted Belarusian representative |
| 13 | Vilius Gaigalaitis | 20 March 1920 | | Coopted representative from Lithuania Minor |
| 14 | Motiejus Ivanauskas | 22 January 1919 | | Elected at the Second Conference of the State of Lithuania |
| 15 | Jonas Jakimavičius | 22 January 1919 | | Elected at the Second Conference of the State of Lithuania |
| 16 | Martynas Jankus | 20 March 1920 | | Coopted representative from Lithuania Minor |
| 17 | Steponas Kairys | 21 September 1917 | 11 July 1918 | Elected at Vilnius Conference |
| 18 | Ivan Karčynski | 4 April 1919 | | Coopted Belarusian representative from Hrodna |
| 19 | Juozas Kavoliūnas | 22 January 1919 | | Elected at the Second Conference of the State of Lithuania |
| 20 | Petras Klimas | 21 September 1917 | | Elected at Vilnius Conference |
| 21 | Vaclau Lastouski | 27 November 1918 | | Coopted Belarusian representative |
| 22 | Kristupas Lekšas | 20 March 1920 | | Coopted representative from Lithuania Minor |
| 23 | Ivan Luckievič | 27 November 1918 | 1 January 1919 | Coopted Belarusian representative |
| 24 | Donatas Malinauskas | 21 September 1917 | | Elected at Vilnius Conference |
| 25 | Vladas Mironas | 21 September 1917 | | Elected at Vilnius Conference |
| 26 | Stanisław Narutowicz | 21 September 1917 | 11 July 1918 | Elected at Vilnius Conference |
| 27 | Liudas Noreika | 27 November 1918 | | Coopted by the Council of Lithuania |
| 28 | Alfonsas Petrulis | 21 September 1917 | | Elected at Vilnius Conference |
| 29 | Vytautas Petrulis | 27 November 1918 | | Coopted by the Council of Lithuania |
| 30 | Juozas Purickis | 13 July 1918 | | Coopted by the Council of Lithuania |
| 31 | Nachmanas Rachmilevičius | 11 December 1918 | | Coopted Jewish representative |
| 32 | Simon Rosenbaum | 11 December 1918 | | Coopted Jewish representative |
| 33 | Vincas Šatas | 22 January 1919 | | Elected at the Second Conference of the State of Lithuania |
| 34 | Jurgis Šaulys | 21 September 1917 | | Elected at Vilnius Conference |
| 35 | Kazimieras Šaulys | 21 September 1917 | | Elected at Vilnius Conference |
| 36 | Dominik Semashko | 27 November 1918 | | Coopted Belarusian representative |
| 37 | Jokūbas Šernas | 21 September 1917 | | Elected at Vilnius Conference |
| 38 | Stasys Šilingas | 13 July 1918 | | Coopted by the Council of Lithuania |
| 39 | Antanas Smetona | 21 September 1917 | 4 April 1919 | Elected at Vilnius Conference |
| 40 | Jonas Smilgevičius | 21 September 1917 | | Elected at Vilnius Conference |
| 41 | Jan Stankievič | 27 November 1918 | 1 January 1919 | Coopted Belarusian representative |
| 42 | Justinas Staugaitis | 21 September 1917 | | Elected at Vilnius Conference |
| 43 | Jurgis Strekys | 20 March 1920 | | Coopted representative from Lithuania Minor |
| 44 | Aleksandras Stulginskis | 21 September 1917 | | Elected at Vilnius Conference |
| 45 | Vladislav Taločka | 27 November 1918 | | Coopted Belarusian representative |
| 46 | Jonas Vailokaitis | 21 September 1917 | | Elected at Vilnius Conference |
| 47 | Jazep Varonka | 4 April 1919 | | Coopted Belarusian representative from Hrodna |
| 48 | Jonas Vileišis | 21 September 1917 | 22 January 1919 | Elected at Vilnius Conference |
| 49 | Augustinas Voldemaras | 13 July 1918 | | Coopted by the Council of Lithuania |
| 50 | Jakub Wygodzki | 11 December 1918 | | Coopted Jewish representative |
| 51 | Martynas Yčas | 13 July 1918 | | Coopted by the Council of Lithuania |
