= Konstantinas Šakenis =

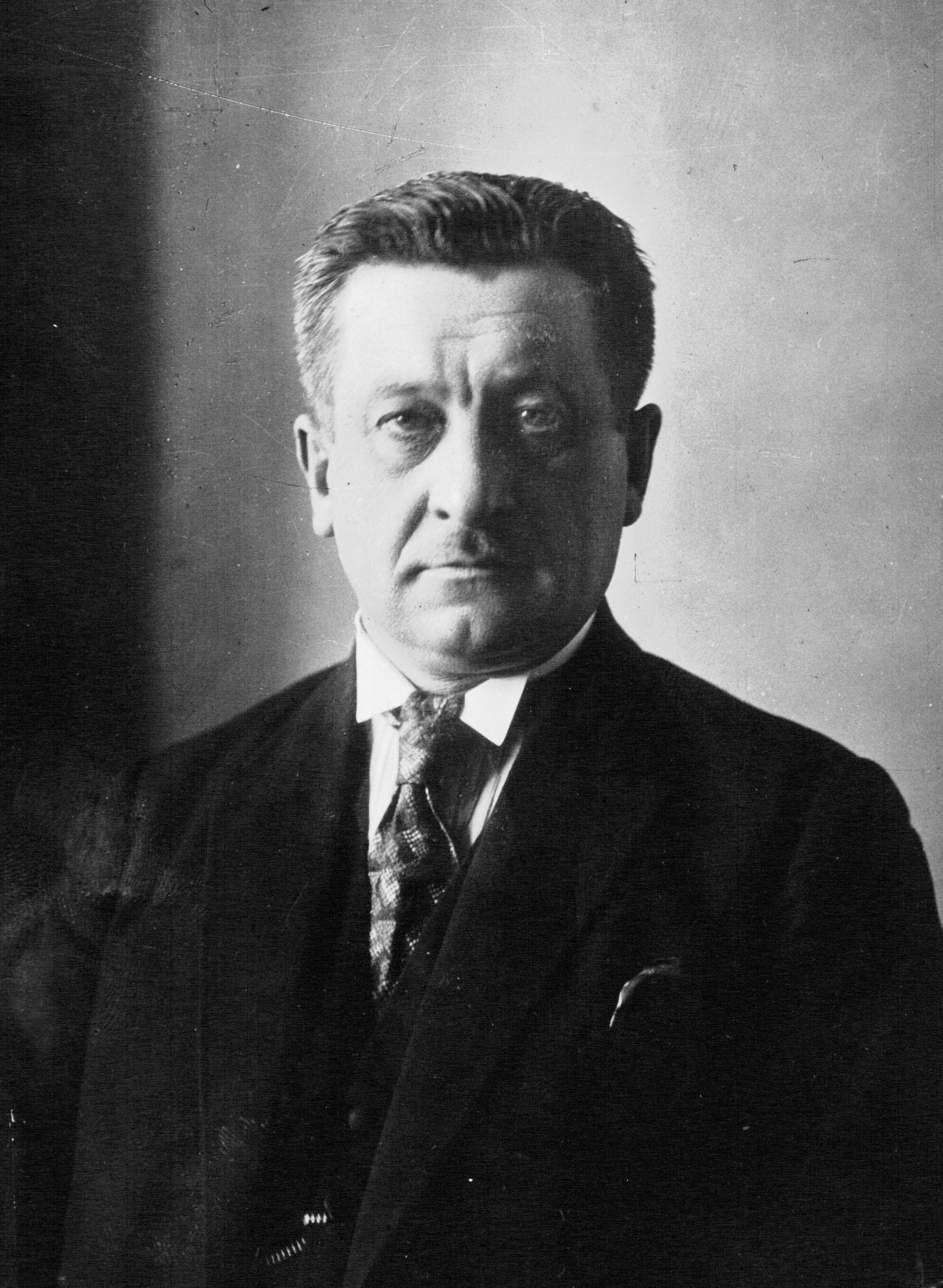
- Šakenis in 1932

Minister of Education
- In office 3 May 1927 – 12 June 1934
- Prime Minister: Augustinas Voldemaras; Juozas Tūbelis
- Preceded by: Leonas Bistras
- Succeeded by: Juozas Tonkūnas

Speaker of the Seimas
- In office 1 September 1936 – 1 July 1940
- Preceded by: Aleksandras Stulginskis
- Succeeded by: Liudas Adomauskas

State Controller of Lithuania
- In office 12 June 1934 – 15 June 1940
- Preceded by: Vincas Matulaitis
- Succeeded by: Liudas Adomauskas

Personal details
- Born: 27 November 1881 Veleniškiai, Russian Empire
- Died: 7 July 1959 (aged 77) Troškūnai, Lithuanian SSR
- Resting place: Vabalninkas
- Party: Party of National Progress; Lithuanian Nationalist Union
- Education: Imperial Petersburg Institute of Technology
- Occupation: Engineer, teacher, politician
- Awards: Order of Vytautas the Great (1930); Order of the Lithuanian Grand Duke Gediminas (1938)

Konstantinas Šakenis (27 November 1881 – 7 July 1959) was a Lithuanian engineer, teacher and politician. He served as Lithuania's Minister of Education from 1927 to 1934, State Controller from 1934 to 1940, and Speaker of the Seimas from 1936 to 1940.

Educated at the Imperial Petersburg Institute of Technology in Saint Petersburg, Šakenis taught physics at various schools in Vilnius, Voronezh, Kaunas, Panevėžys from 1912 to 1926. In 1920, he published a three-part Lithuanian physics textbook for gymnasiums. He was active in the Lithuanian public life. During World War I, he was a member of the Lithuanian Society for the Relief of War Sufferers. He was a member of the central committees of the Party of National Progress (1920–1924) and its successor the Lithuanian Nationalist Union (1928–1933).

In December 1926, Šakenis became a member of the Third Seimas when he filled the vacancy left by Antanas Smetona who became the president of Lithuania. In April 1927, he became the Minister of Education. During his seven-year tenure, Lithuania implemented mandatory primary education and improved teachers' education and licensing. Šakenis was seen as a strong supporter of president Smetona and implemented educational policies favoring the Lithuanian Nationalist Union, most notably the prohibition of all political and social organizations in schools. After the ministry, Šakenis was the State Controller and the Speaker of the Fourth Seimas. He held both positions until the Soviet occupation of Lithuania in June 1940.

He was arrested by the Soviet NKVD during the June deportation in 1941. He was sentenced to ten years in prison and lifetime in exile, but was released in 1956 and returned to Lithuania. He wrote poetry and finished his memoir, which were posthumously published in 1990s after Lithuania regained independence.

== Biography ==
=== Early life and education ===
Šakenis was born on 27 November [O.S. 15 November] 1881 in the village of Veleniškiai, in the Vabalninkas volost of what was then the Kovno Governorate of the Russian Empire (now Biržai District Municipality, Lithuania). His family were royal peasants who had greater personal freedoms than serfs and sought education. His uncles Ferdinandas was deported to Siberia for participating in the Uprising of 1863, Juozas was a military doctor educated at Moscow University, and Pelicijonas worked for the railroad. Šakenis was the eldest of six siblings. His brother Julijonas became a Roman Catholic priest.

Šakenis was first educated by a daraktorius at a clandestine school at his home. In September 1892, he enrolled at Šiauliai Boys' Gymnasium. There he was friends with the future engineer Antanas Gravrogkas and belonged to a small group of Lithuanian students that promoted the use of the Lithuanian language.

He graduated from the gymnasium with a silver medal in June 1900 and enrolled in the Faculty of Physics and Mathematics at the University of St. Petersburg. He joined a society of Lithuanian students that distributed and promoted Lithuanian press which was illegal due to the Lithuanian press ban and was its vice-chairman. He was expelled in early 1901 for taking part in an anti-Tsarist student unrest, but was able to get readmitted. In 1902, he voluntarily transferred to the Mechanics Faculty of the Imperial Petersburg Institute of Technology. There he studied with his friends Gravrogkas, Steponas Kairys, and Vladas Sirutavičius.

His studies were temporarily interrupted by the Russian Revolution of 1905. He then worked at the Vilija factory of Petras Vileišis, as well as assisted in editing and publishing the first Lithuanian daily Vilniaus žinios. After completing his practicum at Catherine's Railway and as an assistant locomotive engineer at Radviliškis–Mažeikiai railway, Šakenis graduated in May 1910.

=== Early career ===
After graduation, Šakenis moved to Vilnius. In late 1911, he obtained teaching position at the 1st Vilnius Gymnasium and later at the Vilnius Girls' Gymnasium where he taught physics and cosmography. In 1912, he also worked as an engineer on the construction of the headquarters of the Saulė Society in Kaunas. During this time, he participated in the activities of the Lithuanian Mutual Aid Society of Vilnius.

At the start of World War I, Šakenis was elected to the audit committee of the Lithuanian Society for the Relief of War Sufferers. He organised trade workshops and schools on behalf of the Lithuanian Society. In 1915, the Russian gymnasiums along with Šakenis were evacuated to Russia. From September 1915 to June 1918, he served as an inspector of the Lithuanian gymnasium in Voronezh. For nearly a year, he was also an acting principal of the gymnasium while Pranas Mašiotas was recuperating. In late 1917, Šakenis helped edit Lietuvių balsas published by the Party of National Progress.

Šakenis returned to Vilnius in June 1918 and became a teacher of mathematics and physics at the Vilnius Vytautas the Great Gymnasium. At the same time, he wrote a three-part textbook on physics in Lithuanian as there was an urgent need for Lithuanian-language educational materials. At the start of the Lithuanian–Soviet War, Šakenis evacuated to Kaunas.

From June 1919 to July 1925, Šakenis worked at the Lithuanian railways under the Ministry of Communications. At the same time, he taught courses on physics and railroad at the Kaunas Higher Technical School (present-day Lithuanian College of Engineering. In fall 1919, Šakenis participated in drafting plans for a Lithuanian university. These plans were initially rejected leading to the establishment of Higher Courses (they were reorganized into the University of Lithuania in 1922). However, Šakenis did not teach at either the courses or the university. He was hired by the university as senior assistant in early 1925 but chose the position of gymnasium's principal.

In 1922, he became a council member of the Trade and Industry Bank. In July 1925, he replaced Jonas Yčas as the principal of three gymnasiums in Panevėžys (Boys', Girls', and Russian) that shared the same premises. He continued in this role until December 1926. However, already in 1925, he returned to Kaunas and obtained a position with the Ministry of Education.

=== Political career ===
Šakenis was active in the Party of National Progress and was a member of its central committee from 1920 to 1924. In 1924, the party was reorganized into the Lithuanian Nationalist Union. On its ticket, he ran in the May 1926 election to the Third Seimas in the Panevėžys district. He was listed second to Antanas Smetona and was not elected. Following the December 1926 coup, Smetona became the President of Lithuania and Šakenis took his seat in the Seimas. Šakenis was officially sworn in on 30 December 1926, but was not active in the proceedings.

==== Minister of Education ====
Smetona dissolved the Seimas on 12 April 1927 which caused a government crisis and a new cabinet was formed on 3 May 1927. Šakenis became the Minister of Education and served under prime ministers Augustinas Voldemaras and Juozas Tūbelis until 12 June 1934 when the cabinet resigned in the aftermath of the attempted coup by voldemarininkai. At the same time, from 1928 to 1933, Šakenis was a member of the central committee of the Lithuanian Nationalist Union. According to the memoirs of general Stasys Raštikis, Šakenis was usually quiet and agreed with the president Smetona.

During his tenure as minister, Lithuania carried out some key reforms in education, including implementation of the mandatory primary education. While the law on the mandatory education was adopted in 1922, it was implemented during Šakenis' tenure. In 1931, the government announced that the implementation was complete. Other accomplishments included expansion of trade schools, improvements to teachers' education and licensing, enhancement of physical and material school resources, opening of the Kaunas Institute for the Blind in 1927 and of the Klaipėda Institute of Commerce in 1934, reorganization of the Kaunas Music School into the Conservatory. He chaired a committee which organized the celebrations of the 500th death anniversary of Grand Duke Vytautas the Great in 1930 and supervised construction of the Vytautas the Great War Museum. He supported activities of the Scout Association of Lithuania and the Lithuanian Riflemen's Union allowing them to operate in all public schools from October 1928.

Šakenis also implemented several policies that benefited the Lithuanian Nationalist Union. Most notably, on 30 August 1930, he issued a circular prohibiting all political and social organizations in schools. This was primarily aimed against the Catholic youth association Ateitis, but also affected socialist and nationalist groups. Only the scouts, whose supreme chief was president Smetona, were allowed to operate in schools. The circular elicited official protests from the Holy See arguing that it violated the Concordat of 1927. Ateitis continued to be active among students, despite police investigations and threats of expulsion.

During Šakenis' tenure, the government adopted a new statute of the University of Lithuania which significantly curtailed its autonomy and increased influence of the Ministry of Education. In another move against the Lithuanian Christian Democratic Party, the Faculty of Theology and Philosophy was significantly reduced in August 1931: five of 22 departments were cut, and the number of senior professors reduced from 37 to 19.

==== State Controller and Speaker of the Seimas ====
From 12 June 1934 to 15 June 1940 (or 17 July), Šakenis served as the State Controller of Lithuania.

From 1 September 1936 to 1 July 1940, Šakenis was a member of the Fourth Seimas and its Speaker. Elected after nearly a decade, the Seimas was primarily an advisory body to the president. On a few occasions, Šakenis publicly declared that the main function of the Seimas was to assist the president, and not to represent the will of the Lithuanian people. He chaired most of the Seimas sessions and, as state controller, presented annual state budgets for approval but only on a few occasions participated in discussions on specific laws.

Šakenis was a member of various societies, including chairman of the Lithuanian Engineers' Union, member of the board of the Scout Association of Lithuania and Young Lithuania, and benefactor of the student's association Neo-Lithuania. In September 1930, he was one of the co-founders of the Lithuanian Nationalist Fund which provided financial aid to students who supported the Lithuanian Nationalist Union. He also organized the construction of a primary school in Vabalninkas. Completed in 1936, it was named in his honor in 1937.

On 15 June 1940, during the government's last meeting before the Soviet occupation, Šakenis was among the few ministers who spoke in favour of armed resistance rather than compliance with the Soviet ultimatum.

After the occupation, Šakenis was dismissed from his government roles and moved to his birthplace in Veleniškiai. The new Soviet regime sharply criticized him. For example, Antanas Sniečkus speaking to the People's Seimas referred to Šakenis as a "spineless" "political fool" who helped politicians swindle government's money. In both roles, the controller and speaker, Šakenis was replaced by Liudas Adomauskas who helped to transform Lithuania into a Soviet socialist republic.

=== Soviet persecution ===
On 14 June 1941, during the June deportation, Šakenis was arrested by the Soviet NKVD. On 3 March 1946, he was sentenced to ten years in prison and lifetime exile according to the Article 58 by the Special Council of the NKVD. He was imprisoned in various Siberian Gulag camps, including in Reshoty near Nizhnyaya Poyma (part of Kraslag) in the Krasnoyarsk Krai and near Tayshet (part of Ozerlag) in Irkutsk Oblast. In May 1951, he was exiled to Zakharovka in the Krasnoyarsk Krai and later to Kyonga in Tomsk Oblast where he was able to reunite with his family.

He was released in July 1956 and returned to Lithuania in poor health. He lived in Troškūnai where he died on 7 July 1959. He was buried in Vabalninkas in his family grave. In 2008, his grave was added to the Registry of Cultural Property.

== Publications ==
=== Physics textbook ===
In 1920, Šakenis published three-part physics textbook for Lithuanian gymnasiums. He continued to edit and improve it, and there were five editions published before 1940. It remained the primary physics textbook used in gymnasiums for the entire interwar period. The textbook was based on the Russian textbook by Konstantin Kraevich, but information was presented differently and included Lithuanian examples (for example, the transatlantic flight of Lituanica). In later editions, the book included some advanced topics like the four-dimensional space by Hermann Minkowski and the theory of relativity by Albert Einstein.

Writing the book was difficult because there was no established Lithuanian terminology. Šakenis consulted with other specialists (Zigmas Žemaitis, Pranas Mašiotas, Marcelinas Šikšnys) and linguist Jonas Jablonskis. As such, the book is valued for its contribution to the Lithuanian terminology.

=== Historical studies ===
Šakenis published two historical studies.

While still a student in Saint Petersburg, Šakenis received a special permit to study archives the Lithuanian newspaper Aušra at the Imperial Public Library. He published a few articles in Vilniaus žinios in 1905–1906 and a larger study "Aušra" ir jos gadynė for the 50th anniversary in 1933.

Vabalninkas ir jo apylinkė praeityje ligi Lietuvos nepriklausomybės atgavimo, a local history of the Vabalninkas area, was published by the Lithuanian Historical Society in 1935.

=== Poetry and memoir ===
Šakenis was interested in poetry. In 1909, he translated a few poems by Adam Mickiewicz and published them in Viltis. He published the full translation of Pan Tadeusz in 1924. Critics in the magazine Kultūra valued the translation not for its poetic qualities, but for faithfulness to the original.

During his imprisonment and exile in Siberia, Šakenis composed poetry but was unable to write it down due to lack of paper. He was able to write down about 12,000 lines of poetry after he returned to Lithuania in 1956. These poems were published by his son, Romualdas Šakenis, in 1995 as Vaizdai ir mintys nelaisvėje (Images and Thoughts in Confinement). Though simple and unrefined, his verses include elements of local heritage, provide historical insights, and showcase his patriotism. The book includes 69 translated poems by Mikhail Lermontov, Alexander Pushkin, Nikolai Nekrasov, Aleksey Apukhtin, Afanasy Fet, Nikoloz Baratashvili, Raphael Patkanian, Victor Hugo, and others.

His memoir Iki "Vaizdų ir minčių nelaisvėje" (Before "Images and Thoughts in Confinement") were published in 1997. The memoir, started in 1934 and continued after his return from Gulag camps, cover the events up to 1925.

=== Other ===
In 1911, encouraged by Antanas Smetona and Jonas Basanavičius, Šakenis wrote a study on Polonization carried out by the bishops of Vilnius. The manuscript was taken by the Italian priest Aurelio Palmieri and used in his publications.

In addition, Šakenis published articles in various Lithuanian newspapers, including Vilniaus žinios, Viltis, Vairas, Lietuvos ūkininkas.

== Legacy ==
His son Romualdas worked to build a memorial stone and reconstruct a granary in his birth village of Veleniškiai. A memorial museum dedicated to Šakenis was opened in Veleniškiai on 6 July 2000.

On 26 July 1943, Šakenis sent a birch bark letter to his wife for his son's 11th birthday. The letter is preserved at the Biržai Region Museum and was included among 148 such letters in a multinational application to include them in the Memory of the World Register by UNESCO in 2023. His imprisonment and deportation was highlighted in the permanent exhibition of the Ninth Fort.

Streets named after Šakenis are located in Kaunas, Vilnius, and Vabalninkas. A memorial plaque was affixed to the house in Kaunas where he lived in 1930–1940 for his 125th birth anniversary.

== Personal life ==
In 1928, Šakenis married Stanislava Šakenienė née Giedraitytė (1900–1982) in a ceremony officiated by Vladas Mironas. The wedding was attended by many government officials and is noted as one of the last events where president Antanas Smetona and prime minister Augustinas Voldemaras were still on friendly terms before their falling out in early 1929.

Šakenienė was from a well-connected family. Her brother Balys Giedraitis was the Minister of Defense in 1930–1934, while her sister was married to the engineer and professor Kazimieras Vasiliauskas. Šakenienė was also a cousin of Sofija Smetonienė, the first lady of Lithuania. Historians discuss these relationships when analyzing the impact of family ties on politicians' careers.

Educated at the University of Lithuania, Šakenienė became one of the first Lithuanian women surgeons. She chaired the Lithuanian Society for the Care of the Blind from 1930 to 1940.

Šakenienė together with her son Romualdas and daughter Rita were deported in June 1941 to Komarovka in Parbig rural settlement, Tomsk Oblast. Both children escaped to Lithuania in 1947 and Šakenienė followed in 1948. However, she was quickly caught and sentenced to three years in prison. The children were arrested in summer 1952 and deported to Kyonga where they reunited with their parents in 1953. The family returned to Lithuania in 1956.

== Awards ==
Šakenis was awarded:

- Order of Vytautas the Great, 2nd class (1930)
- Order of the Three Stars, 1st class (1932)
- Order of the Iron Wolf by the Scout Association of Lithuania (1934)
- Order of the Lithuanian Grand Duke Gediminas, 1st class (1938)
- Riflemen's Star (1938)

== Bibliography ==
- Akmenytė-Ruzgienė, Vilma (27 January 2025). "Šakenis Konstantinas (1881–1959)". IV Seimo (1936–1940) nariai (in Lithuanian). Lietuvos Respublikos Seimo kanceliarija.
- Baltiņa, Dagnija (December 2024). "Nomination as an Agent of Change: Letters Written on Birch Bark in Siberia 1941-1965". International Journal of Documentary Heritage. 1 (1). doi:10.71278/IJODH.2024.1.1.5. ISSN 3058-9061.
- Bitautas, Algis (2016). "Lietuvos Respublikos 1918–1940 m. vyriausybių ministrų kolektyvinė biografija". In Tamošaitis, Mindaugas; Bitautas, Algis; Svarauskas, Artūras (eds.). Lietuvos Respublikos 1918–1940 m. vyriausybių ministrų biografinis žodynas (in Lithuanian). Vilnius: Mokslo ir enciklopedijų leidybos centras. pp. 514–529. ISBN 978-5-420-01778-4.
- Bitautas, Algis; Tamošaitis, Mindaugas (2016). "Šakenis Konstantinas" (PDF). In Tamošaitis, Mindaugas; Bitautas, Algis; Svarauskas, Artūras (eds.). Lietuvos Respublikos 1918–1940 m. vyriausybių ministrų biografinis žodynas (in Lithuanian). Vilnius: Mokslo ir enciklopedijų leidybos centras. pp. 402–406. ISBN 978-5-420-01778-4.
- Bukelevičiūtė, Dalia; Gaidis, Ryšard; Jakubčionis, Algirdas; Kaubrys, Saulius; Šmigelskytė-Stukienė, Ramunė (2015). Lietuvos valstybės kontrolės istorija (PDF) (in Lithuanian). Vilnius: Vilniaus universiteto leidykla. ISBN 978-609-459-485-4.
- Čepėnas, Pranas, ed. (1972). Lietuvos Universitetas 1579–1803–1922 (in Lithuanian). Chicago: The Association of Lithuanian-American Professors. OCLC 2152067.
- Česnulis, Vytautas Valentinas (25 August 2015). "Lietuvių laikraščių redaktorė Marija Žukauskaitė" (PDF). Voruta (in Lithuanian). 8 (814): 14–15.
- Eidintas, Alfonsas (2015). Antanas Smetona and His Lithuania: From the National Liberation Movement to an Authoritarian Regime (1893-1940). On the Boundary of Two Worlds. Translated by Alfred Erich Senn. Brill Rodopi. ISBN 978-9-004-30203-7.
- Jencius-Butautas, Viktoras (27 July 2019). "Donato Malinausko veikla Lietuvių draugijoje nukentėjusiems dėl karo šelpti" (PDF). Voruta (in Lithuanian). 7 (861): 5.
- Jonaitis, Henrikas (1989). Fizikos mokymo Lietuvoje istorija (1573–1940) (in Lithuanian). Vilnius: Vilniaus universitetas.
- Kasparavičius, Algimantas (2008). Tarp politikos ir diplomatijos: Šventasis Sostas ir Lietuvos Respublika (in Lithuanian). Lietuvos istorijos instituto leidykla. ISBN 978-9955-847-03-8.
- Kaulakienė, Angelė (2002). "Konstantino Šakenio "Fizikos" vadovėlio terminija". Terminologija (in Lithuanian). 9: 66–77. ISSN 1392-267X.
- Kerulis, A.; Prunskis, Juozas; Valiukėnas, M. (1988). Lietuviai tautininkai – komunistų kankiniai (PDF) (in Lithuanian). Chicago: National Lithuanian Society of America.
- Kurienė, Viktorija (2023). "Kazimiero Vasiliausko ir Viktoro Katiliaus rankraščių fondai Lietuvos Martyno Mažvydo nacionalinėje bibliotekoje" (PDF). Lietuvių katalikų mokslo akademijos metraštis (in Lithuanian). 46: 221–234. ISSN 1392-0502.
- Mančinskas, Česlovas (1996). "Aukštieji kursai – pirmoji nepriklausomos Lietuvos aukštoji mokykla". Lietuvos istorijos studijos (in Lithuanian). 3: 75–89. ISSN 1648-9101.
- Martišius, Jonas Algirdas (1997). "Apie Konstantino Šakenio palikimą (115-ąsiais gimimo metines minint)". Istorija (in Lithuanian). 35: 135–149. ISSN 2029-7181.
- Rindzevičiūtė, Eglė (2012). "Hegemony or Legitimacy? Assembling Soviet Deportations in Lithuanian Museums". In Davoliūtė, Violeta; Balkelis, Tomas (eds.). Maps of Memory. Trauma, Identity and Exile in Deportation Memoirs from the Baltic States. Institute ofLithuanian Literature and Folklore. ISBN 978-609-425-089-7.
- Ragauskas, Aivas; Tamošaitis, Mindaugas, eds. (2007). Lietuvos Respublikos Seimų I (1922–1923), II (1923–1926), III (1926–1927), IV (1936–1940) narių biografinis žodynas. Didysis Lietuvos parlamentarų biografinis žodynas (in Lithuanian). Vol. 3. Vilniaus pedagoginis universitetas. pp. 501–502. ISBN 978-9955-20-345-2.
- Šenavičienė, Ieva (1982). Fizikos raida Lietuvoje 1920–1940 m. Iš mokslų istorijos Lietuvoje (in Lithuanian). Vilnius: Mokslas. OCLC 8806601.
- Senkus, Vladas (1997). "Vladas Mironas". In Speciūnas, Vytautas (ed.). Lietuvos Respublikos ministrai pirmininkai (1918–1940) (in Lithuanian). Vilnius: Alma littera. pp. 369–406. ISBN 9986-02-379-3.
- Skrupskelis, Kęstutis (2010). Ateities draugai: ateitininkų istorija (iki 1940 m.) (in Lithuanian). Vilnius: Naujasis židinys-Aidai. ISBN 9786099505923.
- Sperskienė, Rasa (2023). "Lietuviškų organizacijų ir partijų Rusijoje 1917-1918 m. politinės veiklos reikšmę atskleidžiantys dokumentai LMA Vrublevskių bibliotekoje". LMA Vrublevskių bibliotekos darbai (in Lithuanian). 12: 57–84. ISSN 2783-7300.
- Surblys, Alvydas (4 December 2021). "K. Šakenio gyvenimo stotelės". Kauno diena (in Lithuanian).
- Terleckas, Vladas (1999). "Pirmasis nacionalinis komercinis bankas" (PDF). Pinigų studijos (in Lithuanian). 1: 56–62.
- Vaičeliūnas, Antanas (30 May 2017). "Save vadinęs inžinieriumi" (in Lithuanian). Šiaurės rytai.
