= Jonas Jakimavičius =

Lithuanian politician (1889–1945)

- Born: 3 May 1889; Šeštokiškiai, Russian Empire
- Died: 1 May 1945 (aged 55); Turukta, Sakha Republic, Soviet Union
- Education: Tartu Veterinary Institute
- Occupation: Veterinarian
- Known for: Member of the Council of Lithuania and the Fourth Seimas

Jonas Jakimavičius (3 May 1889 – 1 May 1945) was a Lithuanian veterinarian, who became a member of the Council of Lithuania (1919–1920) and the Fourth Seimas (1936–1940).

Educated at the Tartu Veterinary Institute, Jakimavičius owned a farm in Juodžiai and worked as a veterinarian. In January 1919, he was elected to the Council of Lithuania during the Second Conference of the State of Lithuania and became a member of its presidium. In July 1921, he was mobilized into the Lithuanian Army. He served as a veterinarian earning the rank of senior lieutenant. Released to the reserves in 1923, he returned to farm work. In 1936, he was elected to the Fourth Seimas and became one of its most active members. The Seimas was disbanded after the Soviet occupation in June 1940 and Jakimavičius was deported to Siberia in June 1941. He died there in 1945.

== Biography ==
=== Education ===
Jakimavičius was born on 3 May 1889 in Šeštokiškiai village near Josvainiai in the present-day central Lithuania (then part of the Russian Empire) into a family of Lithuanian farmers. After graduating from a real school in Liepāja in 1906, he enrolled at the Tartu Veterinary Institute. He graduated as a veterinarian in 1912 and returned to Lithuania where he rented a farm in Juodžiai and opened a private veterinary practice.

=== Council of Lithuania ===
In September 1917, he attended the Vilnius Conference which elected the 20-member Council of Lithuania. He was elected to the council during the Second Conference of the State of Lithuania in January 1919. On 19 February 1919, Jakimavičius was elected to the council's economic committee and became its secretary. On 12 April 1919, he was elected to the presidium of the council as deputy member and continued in this role until the council was replaced by the Constituent Assembly of Lithuania in May 1920.

In January 1919, he was described as nonpartisan but supporter of the Lithuanian Christian Democratic Party by the daily Lietuva. He later joined the Economic and Political Union of Lithuanian Farmers and was its board member since at least December 1919. He and his wife Liudvika Kriaučeliūnaitė–Jakimavičienė were candidates of the Economic and Political Union of Lithuanian Farmers in the April 1920 election to the Constituent Assembly of Lithuania, but the union gained only 1.12% of the vote and none of its members were elected. Kriaučeliūnaitė–Jakimavičienė attended the Lithuanian teachers' courses in Voronezh in 1917 and for some time worked as a teacher in Karmėlava.

=== Military service ===
In February–April 1919, he worked as veterinarian of the Kaunas city kommandatura. On 27 July 1921, he was mobilized to the Lithuanian Army and was assigned as a veterinarian to the 2nd Artillery Regiment. He was promoted to lieutenant in October 1921 and senior lieutenant in May 1923. He was reassigned to the 4th Infantry Division in April 1923. On 26 November 1923, he was released into reserves. He then returned to his farm in Juodžiai which he purchased in 1924.

=== Fourth Seimas ===
After nearly a decade, new elections were called to the Fourth Seimas in June 1936. Before the election, all political parties except the Lithuanian Nationalist Union were banned ensuring that all seats were taken by the union's candidates. Jakimavičius was elected in the I (Kaunas) electoral district. The Seimas convened on 1 September 1936 and continued until it was disbanded on 1 July 1940 after the Soviet occupation in June 1940.

Jakimavičius was one of the most active members of the Seimas. During its sessions, he frequently spoke on issues regarding education (for example, he opposed increasing stipends arguing that students needed to learn self-sufficiency), transportation (was elected to a committee to work on road taxes), state budget (was elected to a committee to work on the budget for 1938), agriculture and land reform, veterinary medicine, etc. He supported the law on forced labor (see: Dimitravas forced labour camp) in principle but questioned the specifics. He also supported the 1938 Constitution of Lithuania but offered many small editorial amendments. Together with others, he signed almost 20 interpellations addressed to the government of Lithuania.

=== Soviet persecution ===
During the June deportation in 1941, Jakimavičius was sent to the Altai Krai. In 1942, he was transferred to Turukta in the southern Sakha Republic (Yakutia). He died there on 1 May 1945.

At the same time, his sister, wife, and five children were also deported. His sister died in 1942, while his son Jonas was able to escape in 1947 by changing his name to Gediminas Jokimaitis. He returned to Lithuania and published five poetry collections in 1969–1988. The rest of the family returned to Lithuania in 1956–1957.
