= Second Conference of the State of Lithuania =

The Second Conference of the State of Lithuania (Lithuanian: Antroji Lietuvos Valstybės konferencija) was a conference held on 16–22 January 1919 in Kaunas. It was the second conference after the Vilnius Conference in September 1917 that discussed the merits and composition of the Council of Lithuania which adopted the Act of Independence of Lithuania in February 1918.

During 1918, the Council of Lithuania made some controversial decisions (primarily related to the proclamation of a constitutional monarchy) and almost doubled in size. Thus a conference was seen as a way to renew confidence in the council. After the Armistice of 11 November 1918, Lithuania organized the first cabinet of ministers led by the Prime Minister Augustinas Voldemaras and the Council of Lithuania assumed a role equivalent to a parliament. However, the outbreak of the Lithuanian–Soviet War caused a government crisis and left-wing Mykolas Sleževičius of the Lithuanian Popular Socialist Democratic Party agreed to step up and form a new cabinet of ministers. He was particularly critical of the Council of Lithuania and demanded it did not interfere in government affairs.

The conference was attended by 197 delegates from 17 districts; 93 delegates were from the right-wing Lithuanian Christian Democratic Party. As such, the conference adopted a resolution that expressed confidence in the Council of Lithuania and criticized the government. It also elected five new members to the council, all of whom supported the Christian Democrats. However, Sleževičius continued to insist that the Council of Lithuania did not interfere with the government. The conflict led to the resignation of Sleževičius on 6 March. However, the new government which included six members of the council quickly proved to be ineffective. Sleževičius was then invited back to become prime minister. On 4 April, the temporary constitution was revised to grant more power to the government. The Council of Lithuania was effectively suspended.

== Background ==
The original 20 members of the Council of Lithuania were elected at Vilnius Conference in September 1917. On 16 February 1918, the council adopted the Act of Independence of Lithuania but was unable to start organizing the government or other institutions due to the continued German military occupation. The situation rapidly changed after the Armistice of 11 November 1918. Lithuania organized the first cabinet of ministers led by the Prime Minister Augustinas Voldemaras. The Council of Lithuania became equivalent to a parliament.

On 10 December 1918, the Council of Lithuania adopted a law that required to hold a new conference (second after the Vilnius Conference) to review the membership of the council. The idea of such conference was first proposed by the four leftist members (Mykolas Biržiška, Steponas Kairys, Stanisław Narutowicz, and Jonas Vileišis) who withdrew from the council in protest of the Act of 11 December 1917 which declared Lithuania's independence, but called for "a firm and permanent alliance" with Germany. They agreed to return to the council when the members agreed on the Act of Independence of Lithuania which reserved no special rights to Germany. Right after this act was adopted, the four leftist members proposed to convene the second conference which they hoped would help to reduce right-wing influence in the council. However, such conference was not possible due to the German military control in Lithuania.

Since February 1918, the Council of Lithuania was criticized for adopting controversial decisions on the fundamental political future of Lithuania (primarily the decision to establish a constitutional monarchy and invite Wilhelm Karl, Duke of Urach, to become King of Lithuania). It was also criticized as disconnected from the regular Lithuanian people. The council had coopted 19 new members, thus nearly doubling its original size. Thus holding a new conference was viewed as a way to renew confidence in the council and connect it with the people.

== Organizing the conference ==
The Council of Lithuania took up the issue of the conference on 15 November 1918. It debated the law on the conference in five separate sessions. Initial proposals envisioned a conference with broad powers to express no confidence in the council, force its resignation, and hold brand new election. However, after heated debates, the final law severely limited conference's jurisdiction. Its stated were goals were to only receive a report from the council and the government on the internal and foreign affairs and to expand the council by electing new members. At the conference, Justinas Staugaitis explained that the Council of Lithuania was elected by Vilnius Conference until the Constituent Assembly could convene, and the resignation of the council could be interpreted as a coup by foreign powers.

The final law was adopted on 10 December 1918. Delegates to the conference could be sent by parish, district, or city committees. It was understood that general election was impossible given the wartime conditions and thus the conference could not be equivalent to the Constituent Assembly of Lithuania. The conference was organized by a commission elected from the member of the Council of Lithuania. The initial members of this commission were Jonas Vileišis, Ivan Luckievič, Stasys Šilingas, Voldemaras Čarneckis, Liudas Noreika, and Jokūbas Šernas, with one seat reserved for a Jewish representative.

The conference was initially scheduled for 28 December 1918 in Vilnius. However, the outbreak of the Lithuanian–Soviet War and the capture of Vilnius by the Red Army forced the Lithuanian government to evacuate to Kaunas. This caused a government crisis. Mykolas Sleževičius of the Lithuanian Popular Socialist Democratic Party agreed to step up and form a new cabinet of ministers that represented a coalition of parties. He demanded that the Council of Lithuania, as an institution that lost confidence of the people, would be suspended and would not interfere in government affairs until the new conference. This caused a conflict between the council and the government, but Sleževičius prevailed.

== Delegates ==
The conference was attended by 197 delegates from 17 districts. At the time, Lithuania claimed 45 districts, but many of them were under Polish or Bolshevik control. The delegates divided themselves by parties: 93 were from the Lithuanian Christian Democratic Party, 40 were non-partisan, 38 were from the Lithuanian Popular Socialist Democratic Party, 12 from the Party of National Progress, two from Democratic National Freedom League, 12 representatives of Jews and Russians (Polish minority was notably absent). The conference was boycotted by the Social Democratic Party of Lithuania which demanded to immediately call elections to the Constituent Assembly of Lithuania. According to the memoirs of Justinas Staugaitis, the right-wing position was further strengthened when the 2nd Infantry Regiment commanded by Vincas Grigaliūnas-Glovackis showed up in Kaunas.

Such composition was a major disappointment to Sleževičius and other left-wing activists. They tried raising questions whether the conference could be considered representing the Lithuanian nation due to limited geographic representation (only 17 out of 45 districts had a delegate present), but were rebuffed since selection of the delegates followed the law of 10 December 1918.

== Proceedings ==
=== Program ===
The conference convened on 16 January 1919 at the Kaunas City Theater (present-day Kaunas State Musical Theatre). The conference held eleven sessions over seven days. The conferences program was:

1. Openning
2. Report on delegates by the organizing commission
3. Election to the mandate commission
4. Election to the conference's presidium
5. Reports by the Council of Lithuania and the government
6. Most urgent national issues: defense and organization of administration
7. General principles for the election to the Constituent Assembly
8. Election of new members to the Council of Lithuania

=== Resolutions ===
The conference adopted a resolution (99 votes for, 55 against, 10 abstentions) that expressed confidence in the Council of Lithuania and criticized the government. The resolution obligated the government to work with the council. The Lithuanian Popular Socialist Democratic Party presented a resolution that criticized the Council of Lithuania and supported the government, but this resolution received only 55 votes in favor. Resolutions on other issues (defense, organization of administration, future elections to the Constituent Assembly, land reform) elicited little disagreement and were adopted more unanimously.

=== New council members ===
The election of new members was contentious. The Lithuanian Christian Democratic Party elected worker and farmer representatives Liudvikas Brokas, Motiejus Ivanauskas, and Juozas Kavoliūnas. The non-partisan group elected veterinarian Jonas Jakimavičius and teacher Vincas Šatas. The official government newspaper Lietuva described all five new members as Christian Democrats or their sympathizers. Belarusian delegates achieved three new seats in the council as a replacement for Ivan Luckievič and Jan Stankievič who had resigned on 1 January 1919. The three new Belarusian members were officially coopted by the council on 4 April 1919. The Lithuanian Catholic Women's Organization unsuccessfully petitioned to include women into the council.

Such elections strengthened right-wing positions in the council. Leftists were dissatisfied with the results and engaged in protests such as withdrawal from the conference. Jonas Vileišis, the last leftist member of the council and the Minister of Internal Affairs, withdrew from the Council of Lithuania in protest.

== Aftermath ==
=== Attempted compromise ===
While the conference was ongoing, the government and the council conducted side negotiations. The government wanted the authority to enact laws. Such authority was reserved solely to the Council of Lithuania by the Temporary Constitution of 2 November 1919. However, the Council of Lithuania could not function as a parliament due to the ongoing war with the Soviets and the government needed the ability to take swift actions to address the crisis. Therefore, on 24 January, one day after the conference, the council held a session and agreed to revise the Temporary Constitution to allow the government to enact temporary laws. However, such law were valid only until the council approved or revised them. The revision to the Temporary Constitution was published on 5 March 1919.

The government of Sleževičius worked to organize the army and establish basic order in post-war Lithuania and issued a number of basic crucial laws. The Council of Lithuania agreed not to convene for some time. Sleževičius also limited the ability of council members to attend meetings of the government ministers. The council convened on 16 February 1919 for an official celebration of the first anniversary of the Act of Independence of Lithuania. It the worked until 16 March 1919. The agenda included review of about 37 laws adopted by the government. During the session, the council confirmed about 12 laws originally adopted by the government – most without modifications.

=== Government prevails ===
However, the government continued to feud with the council. The conflict between prime minister Sleževičius and council's vice-chairman Stasys Šilingas became public. The conflict reached a boiling point on 5 March 1919. The council reviewed government's law on the enactment of the martial law which increased government powers. The government demanded that the be passed without amendments and warned in advance that any amendments would be interpreted as show of no confidence. However, the council revised the law that the right to declare martial law belonged to the council or the supreme commander of the army, not the government. Therefore, the following day, Sleževičius announced his resignation.

Negotiations regarding a new cabinet dragged on. Therefore, the new government was formed more than a week later, on 12 March. Christian democrat Pranas Dovydaitis became the new prime minister. The ministers included two Christian democrats, three progressives (members of the Party of National Progress), and four nonpartisans. Six ministers were members of the Council of Lithuania. However, the new government was weak and unable to function. Within a week, Dovydaitis effectively resigned leaving his deputy Aleksandras Stulginskis in charge. To address the crisis, Sleževičius was invited to form a new cabinet. He agreed but demanded that the presidium of the Council of Lithuania would be replaced by a single person, the President of Lithuania, and agreed that it would be Antanas Smetona. The council was to effectively suspend its activity. Without other options, the council agreed and issued the Temporary Constitution on 4 April 1919 which adopted the changes demanded by Sleževičius. The new government was confirmed on 12 April 1919. As a result, the council did not hold another session until 15 October 1919, few days after the resignation of Sleževičius.

== Bibliography ==
- Maksimaitis, Mindaugas (2011). Mažoji konstituanta: Lietuvos taryba atkuriant valstybingumą (in Lithuanian). Justitia. ISBN 978-9955-616-65-8.
- Selenis, Valdas (2022). Nepriklausomybės Akto signataras Jokūbas Šernas (in Lithuanian). Lietuvos nacionalinis muziejus. ISBN 978-609-478-058-5.
