= Jonas Smilgevičius =

Lithuanian economist and politician

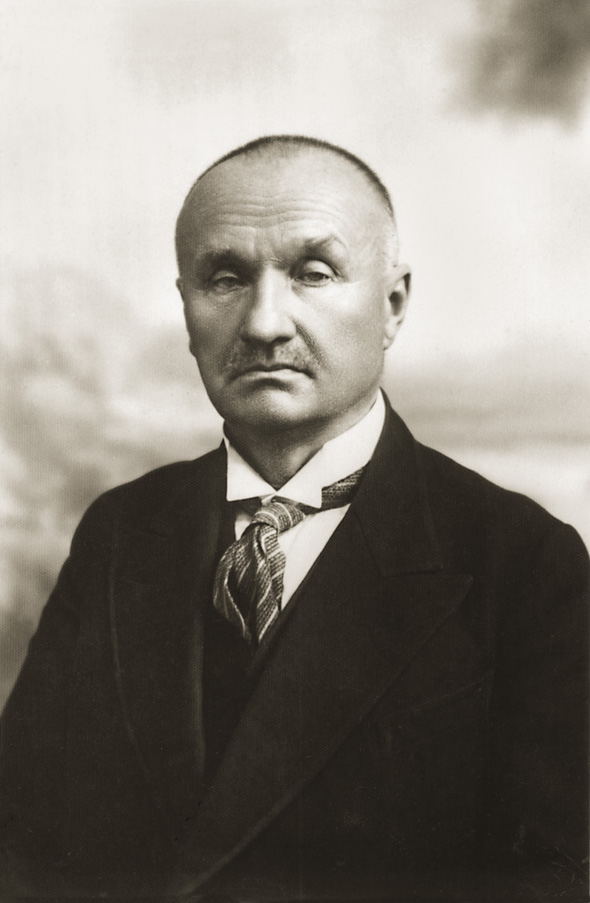
Jonas Smilgevičius

Jonas Smilgevičius (12 February 1870, Šoniai, Kovno Governorate – 27 September 1942) was a Lithuanian economist and politician; he was one of the twenty signatories to the Act of Independence of Lithuania.

Smilgevičius studied economics at the University of Königsberg and at the University of Berlin, graduating in Berlin in 1899. He then worked for the Russian Ministry of Agriculture in St. Petersburg for three years. He lived for a time in Warsaw, where he worked in private industry, and then moved to Vilnius, where he co-founded and directed the agricultural machinery firm Vilija.

After helping organize the Vilnius Conference in 1917, he was elected to the Council of Lithuania, and signed the Act of Independence in 1918.

During the Interwar period, he pursued various private enterprises, and contributed to several economic organizations. Many of his efforts were centered on improving the family estate in Užventis; he sponsored the construction of a brickyard, sawmill, and distillery there. He died in Kaunas in 1942.
