= Fourth Seimas =

Fourth Seimas of Lithuania
←
Third Seimas
Soviet occupation
- (Lithuanian Soviet Socialist Republic) People's Seimas (as legislature of the Lithuanian SSR)
Supreme Council of the Republic of Lithuania (as legislature of restored Republic of Lithuania)
Sixth Seimas (as restored Seimas)
→

Overview
- Legislative body: Seimas
- Jurisdiction: Lithuania
- Term: 1936–1940
- Election: 1936 Lithuanian parliamentary election
- Members: 49
- Chairman: Konstantinas Šakenis
- Party control: Lithuanian Nationalist Union

The Fourth Seimas of Lithuania was the fourth parliament (Seimas) elected in Lithuania after it declared independence on 16 February 1918. The elections took place on 9 and 10 June 1936, a bit less than ten years after the Third Seimas was dissolved by President Antanas Smetona. The Seimas commenced its work on 1 September 1936. Its five-year term was cut short on 1 July 1940 when Lithuania lost its independence to the Soviet Union. It was replaced by the People's Seimas in order to legitimize the occupation. Konstantinas Šakenis was the chairman of the Seimas.

== Background ==
After a military coup d'état in 1926, Smetona assumed the power and continued to strengthen his position. In 1935–1936, Smetona's prestige was declining as a trial against 122 Nazi activists in the Klaipėda Region caused Nazi Germany to declare a boycott of Lithuanian imports of agricultural products. This caused an economic crisis in Suvalkija (Southern Lithuania), where farmers engaged in violent protests. Advisers to Smetona tried to convince him that a Seimas could share the criticisms that was aimed solely at the President.

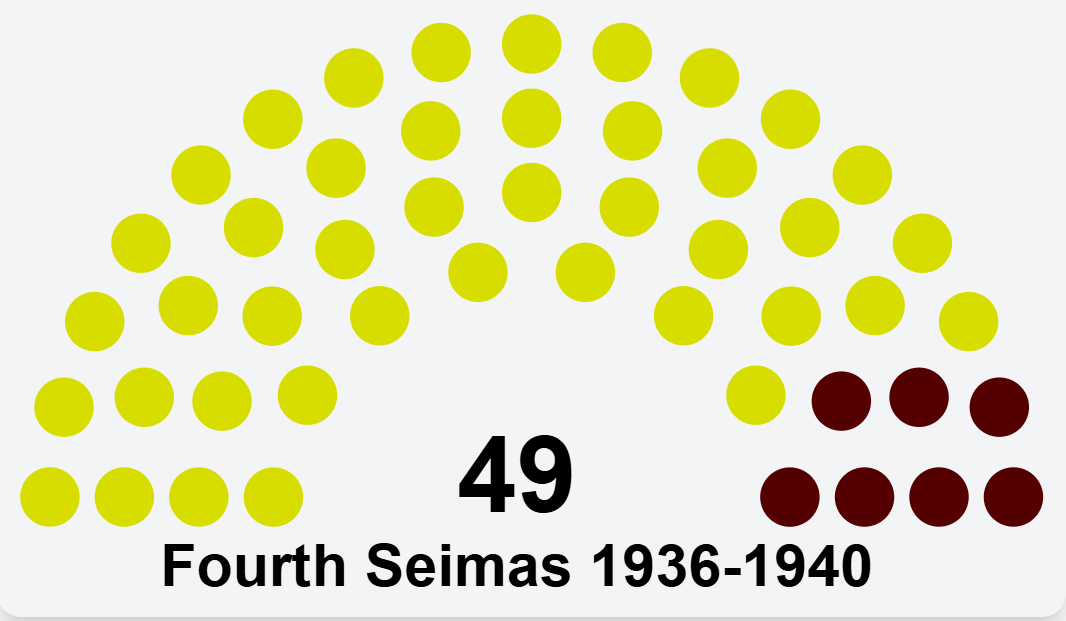

== Elections ==
In early 1936, before the election, all public organizations had to re-register with the government. Political parties, however, were not re-registered and had to close. The Lithuanian Nationalist Union remained the only party in Lithuania. A new electoral law provided that the nominations of the candidates must come not from parties but from counties and municipal councils which were appointed by the central government. The votes were to be cast not for party lists, but for specific individuals. The number of representatives was reduced from 85 to 49. Such changes provided that the Nationalists got 42 seats; remaining seven seats were taken by the Young Lithuania, a youth branch of the Nationalists Union.

The Seimas functioned primarily as an advisory to the President: it debated proposals, made recommendations, and confirmed President's decisions. Its main purpose was to adopt a new constitution. It was accomplished on 11 February 1938. The new constitution provided for even more powers to the president. Up to that point all constitutions defined Lithuania as an independent democratic republic; the 1938 constitution dropped words "democratic" and "republic".

== Members ==
49 men were elected to the Seimas:

1. Pranas Adamkavičius
2. Izidorius Aleksa
3. Pranas Aleksandravičius
4. Pranas Barkauskas
5. Juozas Bikinas
6. Povilas Brazdžius
7. Antanas Bričkus
8. Juozas Buožis
9. Julius Čaplikas
10. Pranas Dailidė
11. Petras Dilys
12. Michael Fesling (resigned on 22 March 1939 after the incorporation of Klaipėda Region to Nazi Germany)
13. Pranas Galvydis
14. Jonas Gečas
15. Alfonsas Gilvydis
16. Mykolas Gylys
17. Klemensas Graužinis (died on 7 August 1939 and was replaced by Ksaveras Andrašiūnas)
18. Bronius Gudavičius
19. Julius Indrišiūnas
20. Jonas Jakimavičius
21. Stasys Jakubauskas
22. Simanas Janavičius
23. Jonas Jasutis
24. Antanas Jučas
25. Michael Jurgaleit (resigned on 22 March 1939 after the incorporation of Klaipėda Region to Nazi Germany)
26. Juozas Kalpokas
27. Aleksandras Kniuipis
28. Jonas Kudirka
29. Vladas Kurkauskas
30. Mečislovas Kviklys
31. Juozas Laukaitis
32. Juozas Maurukas
33. Antanas Merkys
34. Jonas Pakalniškis (Johann Pakalnischis) (resigned on 22 March 1939 after the incorporation of Klaipėda Region to Nazi Germany)
35. Antanas Petrauskas
36. Alfonsas Pimpė
37. Stasys Putvinskis (resigned in summer 1939 for health reasons and was replaced by Vladas Kaveckas)
38. Jonas Raudonis
39. Antanas Repčys
40. Juozas Rimkus
41. Justinas Sadauskas
42. Kipras Stankūnas
43. Kazys Statulevičius
44. Konstantinas Šakenis
45. Petras Šegamogas
46. Juozas Šėža
47. Bronius Tallat Kelpša
48. Jonas Viliušis
49. Valentinas Žalkauskas
