= Restoration of Independence Day =

Restoration of Independence Day may refer to:

- Day of Restoration of Independence (Azerbaijan)
- Day of the Restoration of Latvian Independence
- Independence Restoration Day (Estonia)
- Lithuania Independence Restoration Day
- Restoration of Independence Day (Portugal)
- Sovereignty Restoration Day in Hawaii
