= Liudvikas Brokas =

- Born: 11 December 1872; Near Alvitas, Congress Poland
- Died: 15 April 1950 (aged 77); Kiršai, Lithuanian SSR
- Occupations: Tailor, member of parliament
- Political party: Lithuanian Labour Federation

Liudvikas Brokas (11 December 1872 – 15 April 1950) was a Lithuanian tailor who was a member of the Council of Lithuania (1919–1920) and the Constituent Assembly of Lithuania (1922).

== Biography ==
Brokas was born on 11 December 1872 in the volost of Alvitas in the Suwałki Governorate in Congress Poland. His parents were laborers at a local manor. He became a farm laborer at the age of seven. At the age of sixteen, he learned sewing and became a tailor.

After Lithuania declared independence in 1918, Brokas joined a volost committee in Alvitas. He attended the Second Conference of the State of Lithuania and was elected to the Council of Lithuania on 22 January 1919. At the council, he joined the electoral bloc of the Lithuanian Christian Democratic Party. On 19 February 1919, he joined the economics committee of the council chaired by Vytautas Petrulis. It was responsible for trade, industry, agriculture, communications, etc.

In the April 1920 election to the Constituent Assembly of Lithuania, Brokas was a candidate of the Lithuanian Labour Federation in the Kaunas electoral district. As number eight on the list, he was not elected but became a member of the Constituent Assembly on 20 June 1922 when two members (Jonas Valaitis and Kazys Vosylius) of his electoral list resigned. However, the assembly continued to function for only four months and transcripts of assembly's proceedings show that Brokas did not speak during the sessions.

Brokas was a candidate of the Lithuanian Labour Federation to the First Seimas and Third Seimas, but was not elected.

He died of a stroke on 15 April 1950 in Kiršai near Alvitas. He was buried in the cemetery of Alvitas.
