= Juozas Kavoliūnas =

- Born: 7 May 1885; Šūkleliai, Congress Poland
- Died: 8 January 1975 (aged 89); Bagotoji, Lithuanian SSR
- Occupations: Farmer, activist

Juozas Kavoliūnas (17 May 1885 – 8 January 1975) was a Lithuanian farmer. As a representative of Lithuanian farmers and the Lithuanian Christian Democratic Party, he was elected to the Council of Lithuania in January 1919. During the 1935 Suvalkija farmers' strike, he distributed anti-government proclamations for which he was imprisoned for six years. He was freed after the Soviet occupation of Lithuania in June 1940 only to be arrested and deported during the June deportation in 1941. His wife and three children died in Soviet detention, while he was able to return to Lithuania in 1958.

== Biography ==
=== Activist in Lithuania ===
Kavoliūnas was born on 17 May 1885 in Šūkleliai, now extinct village near the Lithuania–Russia border. It was then part of the Suwałki Governorate of Congress Poland. He was educated at home and worked at his family's farm. In 1910, his parents purchased him about 103 morgens of land in Lauckaimis. He was also active in Lithuanian cultural life. He contributed articles to Lithuanian periodicals Viltis and Šaltinis. He was a member of the Žiburys Society which organized Lithuanian-language schools, Teetotalism Society, and Žagrė agricultural cooperative. In 1916, he organized a Lithuanian primary school at his home.

In 1917, he attended Vilnius Conference which elected the 20-member Council of Lithuania. On 22 January 1919, as a representative of Lithuanian farmers and the Lithuanian Christian Democratic Party, he was elected to the Council of Lithuania at the Second Conference of the State of Lithuania. In April 1919, he became one of the co-founders of the Economic and Political Union of Lithuanian Farmers and was elected its chairman. In September 1921, together with Saliamonas Banaitis and other members of the union, he co-founded the joint stock company Žemdirbių gerovė (its capital stock was one million Lithuanian auksinas).

Kavoliūnas assisted in organizing Lithuanian gymnasium in Kudirkos Naumiestis and reestablishing Žagrė agricultural cooperative. During the 1935 Suvalkija farmers' strike, he actively prepared proclamations, had them printed in Germany, and distributed among local farmers. The proclamations included some of his poems about the difficulties faced by farmers. He was arrested in March 1938 and sentenced by a military court to six years in prison. According to family members, Kavoliūnas refused to request clemency from President Antanas Smetona even though they were personally acquainted.

=== Prisoner in Soviet gulag ===
After the Soviet occupation of Lithuania in June 1940, Kavoliūnas and two other participants in the farmers' strike (Viktoras Šidlauskas and Jonas Masiulis) were freed from prison by the Minister of Justice Povilas Pakarklis of the People's Government of Lithuania on 7 July 1940. He then established contacts with the anti-Soviet underground.

Together with his family, he was arrested during the June deportation in 1941. His wife died of a heart ailment in Altai Krai in early 1942. His three teenage children were deported to Bykovsky, Sakha Republic in the delta of Lena river. They quickly died of starvation.

In 1942, Soviet investigators concluded their case against Kavoliūnas. He was accused of supporting fascist Voldemarininkai and distributing pro-Germany pamphlets during the Suvalkija farmers' strike. They recommended execution under Article 58-13. However, the prosecutor refused to accept this indictment. A revised indictment for "active fight against workers' movement and revolution" was accepted on 2 January 1943. Kavoliūnas was sentenced to eight years in a labor colony. He was held prisoner in the Krasnoyarsk Krai until 1949. He was able to return to Lithuania in 1958. He died on 8 January 1975 in Bagotoji.
