= Aurelio Palmieri =

Italian Catholic priest and writer

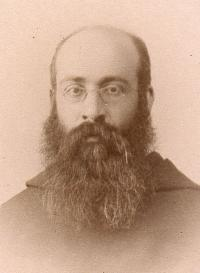

Aurelio Palmieri (4 May 1870, in Savona – 18 October 1926, in Rome) was an Italian priest and scholar. He joined the Augustinians by 1885 but was later laicized. His main focus was theology, history of Christianity, Byzantine studies and eastern Christianity. Palmieri worked for some years at the Congress Library and from 1922 until his death was the director of the Slavonic section of the Institute for Oriental Europe in Italy. He wrote 15 books and hundreds of articles, and also translated literary works of Russian and polish authors. His most significant works are the Russian Church (La chiesa russa, le sue odierne condizioni e il riformismo dottrinal) and Dogmatic Orthodox Theology (Theologia dogmatica ortodoxa (Ecclesiae graeco-russicae) ad lumen Catholicae doctrinae examinata et discussa).

== Bibliography ==
- Lo Gatto, Ettore (March 1927). "Aurelio Palmieri". The Slavonic Review. 5 (15): 683–686. JSTOR 4202119.
- Stibili, Edward (2000). "Palmieri, Aurelio". In Salvatore J. LaGumina (ed.). The Italian American experience : an encyclopedia. New York: Garland Publ. ISBN 0815307136.
