= Lithuania Independence Restoration Day =

State holiday in Lithuania (11 March)

Independence Restoration Day
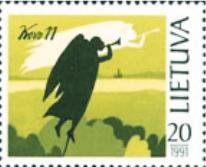
- Stamp celebrating Lithuanian independence
- Observed by: Lithuania
- Date: 11 March
- Next time: 11 March 2026
- Frequency: Annual

The day of restoration of Independence of Lithuania is a Lithuanian national holiday celebrated on 11 March in commemoration of the Act of the Re-Establishment of the State of Lithuania that the Constituent Assembly signed in 1990. It is one of the three principal national holidays in Lithuania, along with the Day of the Re-Establishment of the Statehood of Lithuania on 16 February and the Statehood Day on 6 July.

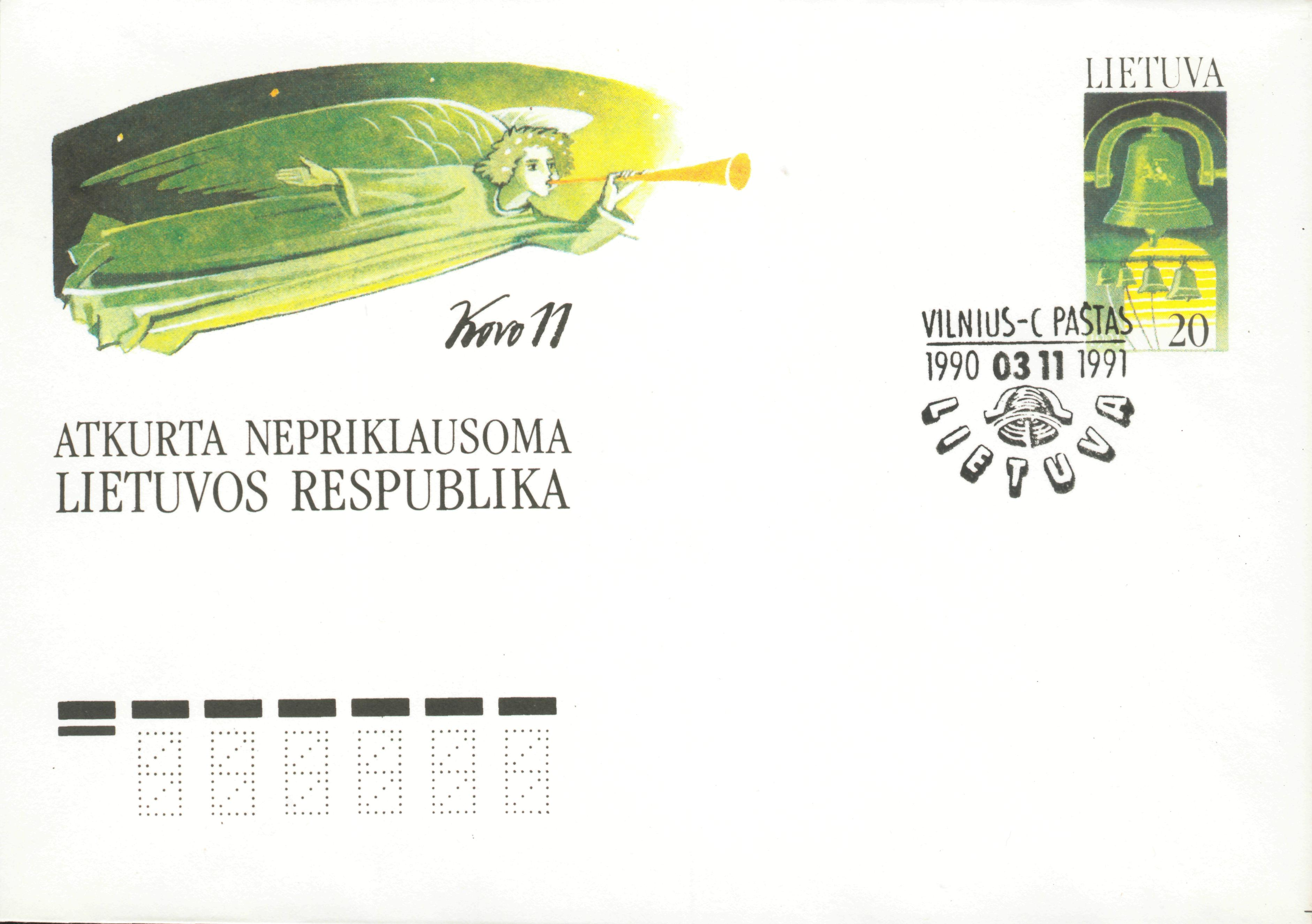
Postcard and postmark celebrating Lithuanian independence

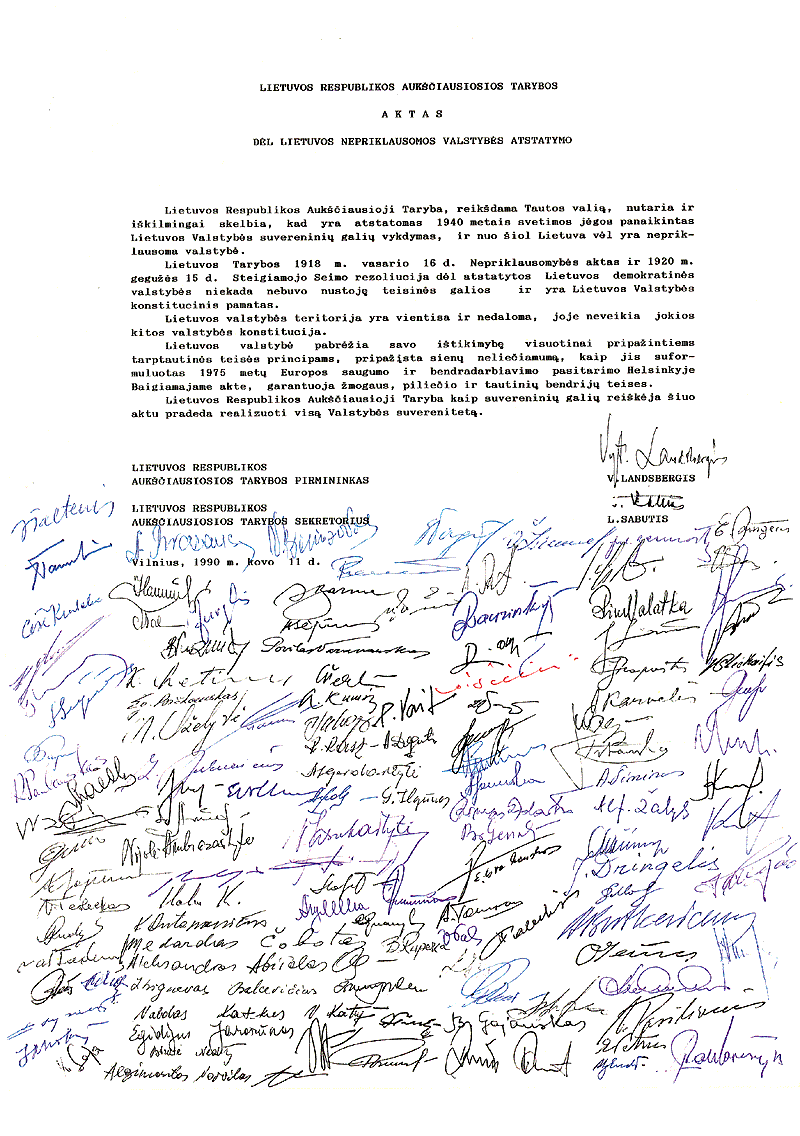
Act of Restoration of Independence of Lithuania, signed 1990-03-11

== Historical context ==
On 15 June 1940, the Soviet Union occupied the independent state of Lithuania. During World War II, as the frontline shifted, the country was occupied by Nazi Germany only to fall back into the USSR's hands in 1944 once again. Since then, the country sought to get its de facto independence back through armed guerrilla strife on the home front and with diplomatic measures among the diaspora. Many Western powers would not recognise the occupation of Lithuania. The beginning of the rebirth was signalled by the first unsanctioned meeting that took place at the monument to Adam Mickiewicz in Vilnius in 1987. The meeting condemned the Molotov–Ribbentrop Pact of 23 August 1939, by which Germany and the USSR divided Europe into spheres of influence between themselves.

In an effort to bring some change to the state, the Reform Movement of Lithuania, a.k.a. Sąjūdis, was established. Its initiative group of 35 members was elected on 3 June 1988. In the summer of the same year, the RML held its first rallies in the country, attended by thousands. On 22–23 October 1988, Vilnius hosted the Constituent Congress of the Reform Movement of Lithuania. It elected the Parliament (Lith. Seimas) of the Reform Movement of Lithuania and the Parliamentary Council. On 15 February 1989, the Seimas made its first declaration that its goal was to restore the independent democratic Republic of Lithuania.

Six months later, on 23 August 1989 – the 50th anniversary of the Molotov-Ribbentrop pact – the RML declared that Lithuania's annexation to the USSR had been committed illegally and without any legal power.

As the political atmosphere in the USSR became more relaxed, the first free and democratic election to the Supreme Council of the Lithuanian SSR took place on 24 February 1990. The deputies elected were mandated to represent the nation.

== Declaration of the restoration of independence ==
The first meeting of the Supreme Council of the Lithuanian SSR kicked off on 10 March 1990 at night. It was broadcast live on radio and television. The meeting elected and approved the Vote-Counting Panel, the Mandate Panel, the secretariat of the inaugural session and spent a lot of time debating the procedure of the election of the President of the Supreme Council. The meeting was adjourned at 11 p.m.

Another two meetings took place on 11 March. The work began at 9 a.m. and continued late into the night. The meetings elected Vytautas Landsbergis as the President of the Supreme Council. It also elected a presidium and approved the powers of the President of the Council of Ministers, Kazimiera Danutė Prunskienė.

The third meeting adopted a set of five documents, including the provisional organic law that laid the foundation for the restoration of Independence. The Independence of the state of Lithuania was officially declared at 10:44 p.m., with 124 deputies voting in favour of the reestablishment of the state, and 6 persons abstaining. No votes were cast against it.

The deputies that attended the first meeting as members of the Supreme Council of the Lithuanian SSR left the third meeting as members of the democratic parliament of the Republic of Lithuania.

The USSR had no intention of recognising Lithuania's independence. On 18 April 1990, it enforced an economic blockade against Lithuania, cutting or grievously restricting the supply of raw materials. The escalating tensions peaked in January 1991, when the Soviet Union deployed its paratrooper units in the Baltic states; on 12 January, armoured troops appeared on the streets of Vilnius. Then, crowds of people gathered at the Press House, the TV tower, the radio and television building, and the House of Parliament, intent to defend the independence peacefully. During the armed aggression on the USSR's part, 14 people were killed on 13 January 1991.

The Russian Federation recognised Lithuania's full and complete independence on 29 July 1991 by signing an agreement on the grounds of cross-border relations with Lithuania.

== Tradition of celebration events ==
Beginning with 1991, the Day of Restoration of Independence is marked with a solemn parliamentary meeting that usually takes place at the historical Hall of the Act of 11 March.

Since 1996, 11 March has been a holiday under the Law on Holidays. It is the day when the country hosts a lot of events and pays respect to the signatories of the Act. The events include parades, concerts, exhibitions. During a solemn meeting, young researches are presented with the State Independence Scholarship for research significant for strengthening Lithuania's statehood.

== See also ==
- Act of Independence of Lithuania
- Public holidays in Lithuania
- Dissolution of the Soviet Union
