= Tartu Veterinary Institute =

Institute in Tartu, Estonia

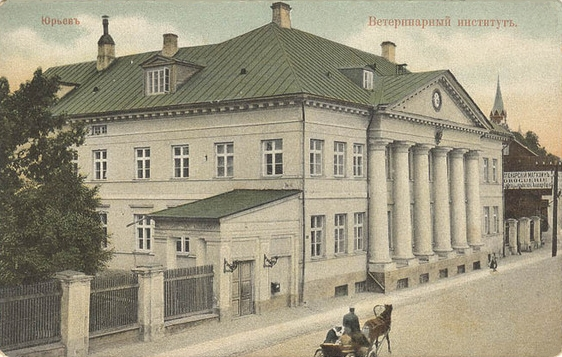
- Tartu Veterinary Institute (about 1900)
- Active: 1873–1918
- Location: Tartu, Estonia; 58°23′14″N 26°43′35″E
- Website: www.isru.ac

Tartu Veterinary Institute (Estonian: Tartu Veterinaariainstituut, German: Kaiserliche Veterinair-Institut zu Dorpat) was an institute which provided a university level education in veterinary medicine. It was located in Tartu, Estonia. The institute was established in 1848 and was, therefore, the oldest veterinary school in Imperial Russia.

The Institute's first director was Hans Peter Boje Jessen.

Studies at the Institute were divided into two levels. The higher level graduated full-fledged veterinarians. The lower level produced veterinary assistants. In 1852, the lower level was discontinued.

In 1918 the Institute became part of Tartu University.
