= Steponas Kairys =

Lithuanian engineer and politician (1879–1964)

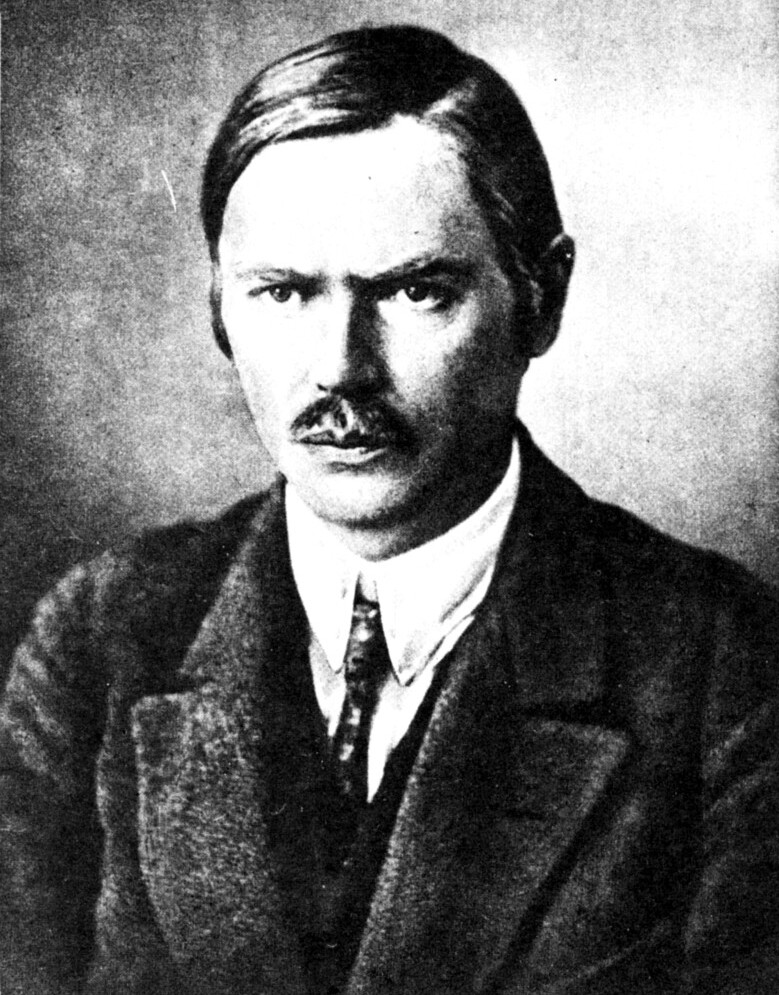

Deputy Speaker of the Seimas
- In office 2 June 1926 – 17 December 1926

Minister of Supply and Food
- In office 12 April 1919 – 7 October 1919
- Prime Minister: Mykolas Sleževičius

Personal details
- Born: 3 January 1879 Užnevėžiai near Ukmergė, Russian Empire
- Died: 16 December 1964 (aged 85) Brooklyn, New York, U.S.
- Resting place: Petrašiūnai Cemetery
- Party: Social Democratic Party of Lithuania (1900–1935)
- Spouses: Alaiza Pashkevich (m. 1912; died 1916) Ona Leonaitė (m. 1923; died 1958)
- Education: Technology Institute of Petersburg

Steponas Kairys (January 3 [O.S. 20 December 1878] 1879 in Užnevėžiai near Ukmergė – 16 December 1964 in Brooklyn) was a Lithuanian engineer, nationalist, and social democrat. He was among the 20 men to sign the Act of Independence of Lithuania on 16 February 1918.

== Engineering career ==
Born in the Anykščiai district, then in Imperial Russia, Kairys graduated from the Institute of Technology in Saint Petersburg. Due to conflicts with the academic administration concerning his participation in student clubs and dissident demonstrations, his studies were intermittently interrupted. Following graduation he worked for several years in railroad construction in the Samara and Kursk regions of Russia. He returned to Lithuania in 1912 and worked on city sanitation and water supply systems in Vilnius, and following the Polish occupation of the city left to the temporary capital of Lithuania, Kaunas. After 1923, he taught at the University of Lithuania in Kaunas, where in 1940, he received an honorary doctorate in engineering.

== Political career ==
Kairys joined the Lithuanian Social Democratic Party in 1900. The party had already separated itself from the Russian Social Democrats and sought independence for Lithuania. Kairys was elected to the Central Committee of the party next year and remained in the leadership roles until the party ceased its activities in 1944. During the Russian Revolution of 1905, he participated in the Great Seimas of Vilnius as a member of presidium. The Great Seimas clearly expressed Lithuania's intentions to become an independent state, or at least to gain considerable autonomy from the Russian Empire.

In 1906, he published the first publications about Japan in Lithuanian, in which, based on the sources, he briefly described the social system and the Constitution of the then Japan, which is why he is often called the first Lithuanian japonologist.

In 1907, Kairys helped the five Lithuanian social democrats elected to the second Duma write speeches and letters. Before World War I, Kairys worked to promote his party and social democracy.

After the German occupation during the war, Kairys became actively involved with people seeking independence for Lithuania. In 1917, he attended the Vilnius Conference, where he was elected to the 20-member Council of Lithuania. The council was formed by the conference to declare and establish independence of Lithuania. The task, however, was extremely tough because of the German Wehrmacht presence in the state. The Germans promised to recognize the state if the council agreed to form a firm and permanent federation with Germany. The council issued a declaration to that effect on 11 December 1917. However, Germany did not keep its word and did not recognize the state. The council was torn apart and Kairys with the three others socialists withdrew on 26 January 1918. However, on 16 February 1918 they returned to sign the Act of Independence of Lithuania. The act did not mention anything in specific about relations to Germany.

The council proceeded to negotiate with Germany, which now demanded to void the 16 February decision and recognized the state based on the 11 December declaration. On 13 July 1918, the council, in hopes to avoid being incorporated into a personal union with the Hohenzollern dynasty, elected Mindaugas II as King of Lithuania. This was unacceptable for Kairys and he left the council, this time permanently. However, he remained active in the politics: he was elected to the Constituent Assembly and all three Seimas before the coup d'état of 1926. The authoritarian regime of Antanas Smetona placed Kairys in an opposition.

== In exile ==
After the 1940 Soviet invasion of Lithuania, the Supreme Committee for the Liberation of Lithuania (Lithuanian: Vyriausiasis Lietuvos išlaisvinimo komitetas or VLIK) was formed and Kairys became its chairman in 1943. The organization united people of different political views. In April 1944 majority of the members were arrested by the Gestapo. Kairys changed his name to Juozas Kaminskas and tried to escape to Sweden. Before moving to the United States in 1951, he lived in Germany, where VLIK was revived. Kairys attempted to gain political support for a democratic socialist opposition among other exiles and expatriates. For the last decade of his life, he battled illness and could not fully participate in various political organizations. Two volumes of his memoirs were published. He died in 1964 in New York. Kairys was reinterred in Petrašiūnai Cemetery of Kaunas.

In 1942, together with his wife, Ona Kairiene, Kairys sheltered 11-year-old Anusė Keilsonaitė, a Jewish girl from the Vilna Ghetto. For this, both of them were later deemed Righteous Among the Nations.
