= Council of Lithuania =

Governing body of newly-independent Lithuania (1917–20)

Council of Lithuania Lietuvos Taryba
- Part of the Lithuanian Wars of Independence
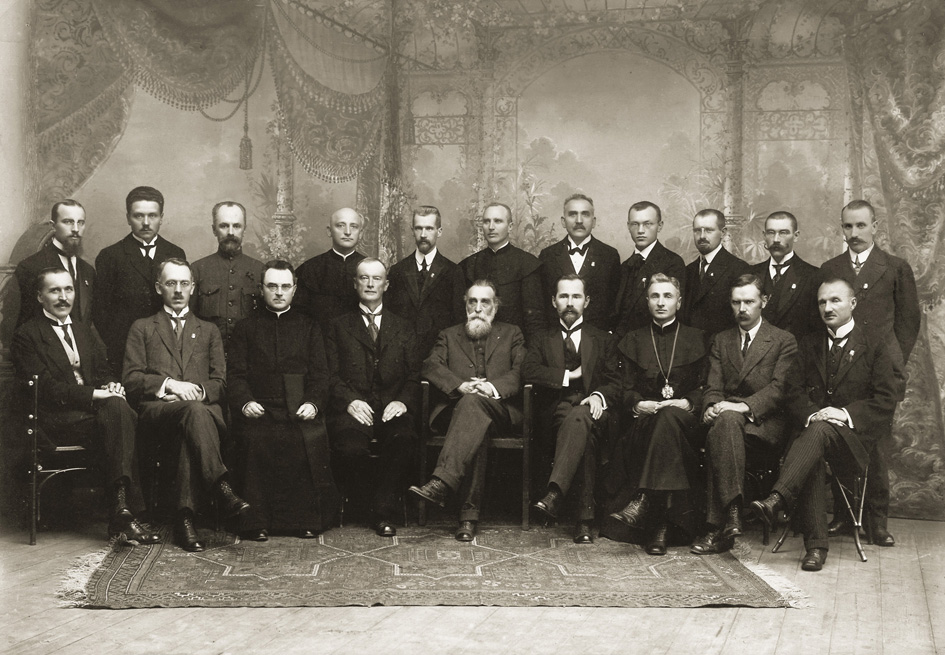
- Twenty members of the First Council in Vilnius, 1917.

Type
- Type: Unicameral

History
- Established: September 18, 1917
- Disbanded: May 15, 1920
- Preceded by: Vilnius Conference
- Succeeded by: Constituent Seimas

Leadership
- Chairman of the Council of Lithuania: Antanas Smetona (first); Stasys Šilingas (last)
- Vice Chairman and Secretary: Jurgis Šaulys
- Seats: Variable; ~20

Meeting place
- House of the Signatories, Vilnius; Later met at: Kaunas State Musical Theatre, Kaunas

The Council of Lithuania (Lithuanian: Lietuvos Taryba; German: Litauischer Staatsrat; Polish: Rada Litewska), later called the State Council of Lithuania (Lithuanian: Lietuvos Valstybės Taryba) was a governing council convened at the Vilnius Conference that took place between 18 and 23 September 1917. The twenty men who composed the council at first were of different ages, social statuses, professions, and political affiliations. The council was granted the executive authority of the Lithuanian people and was entrusted to establish an independent Lithuanian state. On 16 February 1918, the members of the council signed the Act of Independence of Lithuania and declared Lithuania an independent state based on democratic principles. 16 February is celebrated as Lithuania's State Restoration Day. The council managed to establish the proclamation of independence despite the presence of German troops in the country until the autumn of 1918. By the spring of 1919, the council had almost doubled in size. The council continued its efforts until the Constituent Assembly of Lithuania (Lithuanian: Steigiamasis Seimas) first met on 15 May 1920.

== Historical background and Vilnius Conference ==
After the last Partition of the Polish-Lithuanian Commonwealth in 1795, Lithuania had become part of the Russian Empire. During the 19th century, the Poles and Lithuanians attempted to restore their independence. They rebelled during the November Uprising in 1830 and the January Uprising in 1863, but the first realistic opportunity came about during World War I. In 1915, Germany occupied Lithuania as its troops marched towards Russia. After the Russian Revolution in 1917, opportunities for independence opened up. Germany, avoiding direct annexation, tried to find a middle path that would involve some form of union with Germany. In the light of upcoming peace negotiations with Russia, the Germans agreed to allow the Vilnius Conference, hoping that it would proclaim that the Lithuanian nation wanted to be detached from Russia and wished for a closer relationship with Germany. However, the conference, held between 18 and 23 September 1917, adopted a resolution that an independent Lithuania should be established and that a closer relationship with Germany would depend on whether it recognized the new state. On 21 September, the attendees at the conference elected a 20-member Council of Lithuania to establish the resolution. The German authorities did not allow the resolution to be published, but they did permit the council to proceed. The authorities censored the council's newspaper, Lietuvos aidas (Echo of Lithuania), preventing the council from reaching a wider audience. The conference also resolved that a constituent assembly be elected "in conformity with democratic principles by all the inhabitants of Lithuania".

== Membership ==
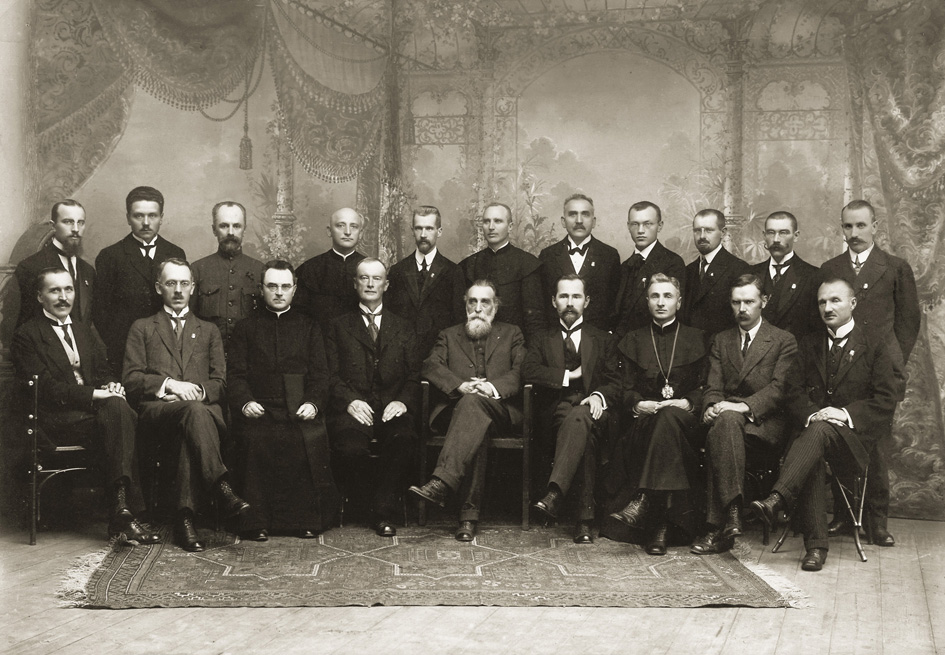
The original 20 members of the council. Jonas Basanavičius is sitting in the center of the front row. Antanas Smetona is seated to his immediate left.

The twenty men who composed the initial council were of different ages (the youngest was 25; the oldest 66), social statuses, professions, and political affiliations. There were eight lawyers, four priests, three agronomists, two financiers, a doctor, a publisher, and an engineer. Eight of the members were Christian democrats and seven were not affiliated. All except one had gained degrees in tertiary education. The council's last surviving member, Aleksandras Stulginskis, died in September 1969.

During the first meeting on 24 September, Antanas Smetona was elected as chairman of the council. The chairman, two vice-chairmen, and two secretaries made up the presidium. The vice-chairs and secretaries would change from time to time, but Smetona retained the chairmanship until 1919 when he was elected the first President of Lithuania. Smetona was succeeded by Stasys Šilingas as the chairman. He was not among the original twenty members. The first change in membership took place on 13 July 1918, when six new members (Martynas Yčas, Augustinas Voldemaras, Juozas Purickis, Eliziejus Draugelis, Jurgis Alekna and Stasys Šilingas) were admitted and the four socialists (Steponas Kairys, Jonas Vileišis, Mykolas Biržiška, Stanisław Narutowicz) resigned in protest over the invitation of Mindaugas II to become King of Lithuania. After the capture of Minsk by the Bolshevik army, hoping some level of autonomy within the Lithuanian state, six members of the Vilnius Belarusian Council joined the Council of Lithuania (Vaclau Lastouski, Ivan Luckievich, Jan Stankievič, Dominik Semashko, Władysław Tołoczko, Kazimierz Falkiewic) on 27 November 1918. Sharing similar hopes for autonomy, three Jewish activists joined the Council on 11 December 1918. Among them two were Zionists (Jakub Wygodzki and Shimshon Rosenboim) and one was Folkist (Nachmanas Rachmilevičius).

By the spring of 1919, the council had almost doubled in size.

== Declaration of Independence ==
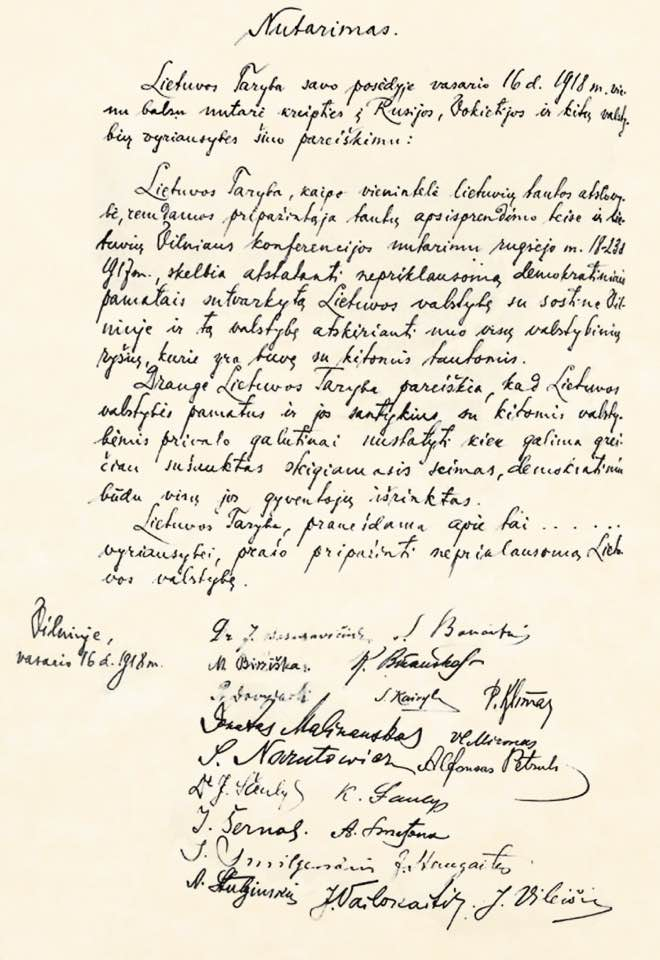
The original hand-written Act of Independence of Lithuania with twenty original signatures of signatories

Soon after the council was elected, major developments took place in Russia. The October Revolution brought the Bolsheviks to power. They signed a truce with Germany on 2 December 1917 and started peace negotiations. Germany needed some documentation of its relationship with Lithuania. In the so-called Berlin Protocol, Germany offered to recognize Lithuanian independence if the latter agreed to form a firm and permanent federation with Germany, based on conventions concerning military affairs, transportation, customs, and currency. The council agreed, on the condition that Lithuania would decide its own internal affairs and foreign policy. The Germans rejected this proposal. On 11 December, the council adopted a resolution agreeing to a "firm and permanent alliance" with Germany on the basis of the four conventions. Only fifteen members voted for this resolution, but all twenty signed it.

The Germans broke their promise and did not recognize the state and did not invite its delegation to the negotiations of the Treaty of Brest-Litovsk. Lithuanians, including those living abroad, disapproved of the 11 December declaration. The declaration, seen as pro-German, was an obstacle in establishing diplomatic relations with England, France and the United States, the enemies of Germany. On 8 January 1918, the same day that Woodrow Wilson announced his Fourteen Points, the council proposed amendments to the declaration of 11 December calling for a constituent assembly. The amendments were rejected by the Germans and it was made clear that the council would serve only advisory functions. The council was torn apart and a few members threatened to leave. On 16 February, the council, temporarily chaired by Jonas Basanavičius, decided to re-declare independence, this time mentioning nothing specific about a relationship with Germany. That was left for a constituent assembly to decide. 16 February is celebrated as Lithuania's State Restoration Day.

== Establishing independence ==
The Germans were not satisfied with the new declaration and demanded that the council go back to the 11 December decision. On 3 March 1918, Germany and Bolshevik Russia signed the Treaty of Brest-Litovsk. It declared that the Baltic nations were in the German interest zone and that Russia renounced any claims to them. On 23 March, Germany recognized independent Lithuania on the basis of the 11 December declaration. However, nothing in essence changed, either in Lithuania or in the council's status: any efforts to establish administration were hindered. The form of government, however, was left undecided. Germany, ruled by a Kaiser, preferred a monarchy. It proposed a personal union with the Prussian Hohenzollern dynasty. As an alternative, on 4 June 1918, the council voted to invite Wilhelm Karl, Duke of Urach, Count of Württemberg, to become the monarch of Lithuania. He agreed and was elected King of Lithuania as Mindaugas II on 13 July 1918. The decision was very controversial and four members of the council left in protest.

Germany did not recognize the new king and its relationship with the council remained tense. The council was not allowed to determine the borders of Lithuania, establish an embassy in Berlin, or begin forming a stable administrative system. It received small funds to only cover its expenses in September 1918. The situation changed when the German Revolution started and Germany lost the war in the fall of 1918, it was no longer in a position to dictate terms. On 2 November, the council adopted the first provisional constitution. The decision to invite King Mindaugas II was annulled and this helped to reconcile the political factions. The functions of government were entrusted to a three-member presidium and Augustinas Voldemaras was invited to form the first Cabinet of Ministers. The first government was formed on 11 November 1918, the day that Germany signed the armistice in Compiègne. The council began to organize an army, police, local government, and other institutions. It also expanded to include ethnic minorities such as Jews and Belarusians. There were no women in the council, despite a petition that garnered 20,000 signatures.

The Freedom Wars started and political processes were derailed during the turmoil. Lithuanian elections to the Constituent Assembly of Lithuania were not held until April 1920. The council was not replaced by a parliament (Seimas) until 2 August 1922, when the Constitution of Lithuania was adopted.

== See also ==
- List of members of the Council of Lithuania
