= Act of Independence of Lithuania =

1918 proclamation restoring the independent State of Lithuania

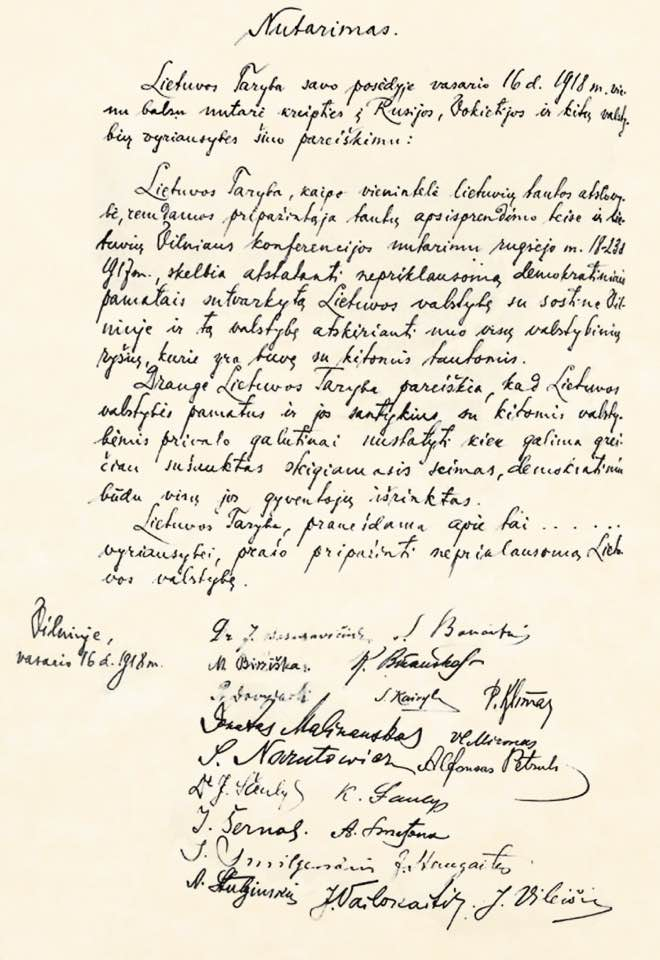
- Hand-written original of the document
- Ratified: February 16, 1918
- Location: Rough draft: House of the Signatories
- Author(s): Jonas Vileišis, Petras Klimas, Mykolas Biržiška, Steponas Kairys
- Signatories: 20 representatives of the Council of Lithuania
- Purpose: To announce separation from the Soviet Russia

The Act of Independence of Lithuania (Lithuanian: Lietuvos Nepriklausomybės Aktas) or the Act of February 16th, also the Lithuanian Resolution on Independence (Lithuanian: Lietuvos Nepriklausomybės Nutarimas), (Note: The signed document is actually titled simply Nutarimas, meaning 'decision' or 'resolution', and it "proclaims the restoration of the independent state of Lithuania".) was signed by the Council of Lithuania on February 16, 1918. It proclaimed independence from Russia and the restoration of an independent State of Lithuania, governed by democratic principles, with Vilnius as its capital. The Act was signed by all twenty representatives of the Council, which was chaired by Jonas Basanavičius. The Act of February 16 was the result of a series of resolutions on the issue, including one issued by the Vilnius Conference and the Act of January 8. The path to the Act was long and complex because the German Empire exerted pressure on the Council to form an alliance. The Council had to carefully maneuver between the Germans, whose troops were present in Lithuania, and the demands of the Lithuanian people.

The immediate effects of the announcement of Lithuania's re-establishment of independence were limited. Publication of the Act was prohibited by the German authorities, and the text was distributed and printed illegally. The work of the Council was hindered, and Germans remained in control over Lithuania. The situation changed only when Germany lost World War I in the fall of 1918. In November 1918 the first Cabinet of Lithuania was formed, and the Council of Lithuania gained control over the territory of Lithuania. Independent Lithuania, although it would soon be battling the Wars of Independence, became a reality.

The laconic Act is the legal basis for the existence of modern Lithuania, both during the interwar period and since 1990. The Act formulated the basic constitutional principles that were and still are followed by all Constitutions of Lithuania. The Act itself was a key element in the foundation of Lithuania's re-establishment of independence in 1990. Lithuania, breaking away from the Soviet Union, stressed that it was simply re-establishing the independent state that existed between the world wars, claiming state continuity, and that the Act never lost its legal power.

== Historic background and Council of Lithuania ==
Lithuania had a centuries-long tradition of statehood following the coronation of Mindaugas, the King of Lithuania.

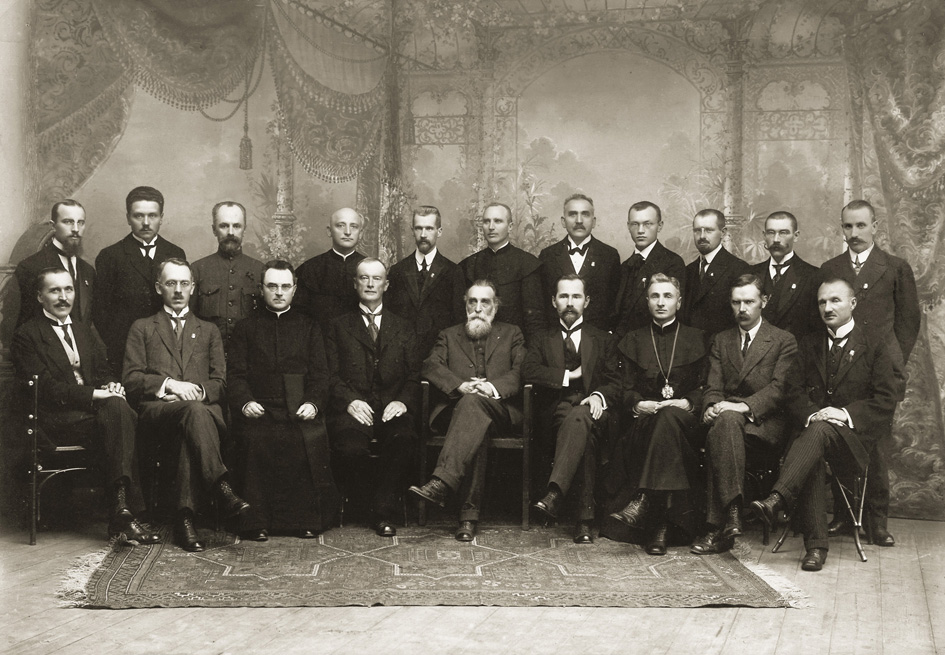
The original 20 members of the Council of Lithuania after signing the Act of February 16, 1918

After the last Partition of the Polish–Lithuanian Commonwealth in 1795, Lithuania was annexed by the Russian Empire. During the 19th century, both the Lithuanians and the Poles attempted to restore their independence. Lithuanians rebelled during the 1830 November Uprising and the 1863 January Uprising, but their first real opportunity arose when both Russia and Germany were weakened during World War I.

In 1915, Germany occupied western parts of the Russian Empire. After the Russian Revolution in 1917, Germany conceived the geopolitical strategy of Mitteleuropa – a regional network of puppet states that would serve as a buffer zone – and agreed to allow the Vilnius Conference, hoping that it would proclaim that the Lithuanian nation wanted to detach itself from Russia and establish a closer relationship with Germany. However, this strategy backfired; the conference, held on September 18–23, 1917, adopted a resolution that an independent Lithuania should be established and that a closer relationship with Germany would be conditional on Germany's formal recognition of the new state. On September 21, the 214 attendees at the conference elected a 20-member Council of Lithuania to codify this resolution. The German authorities did not allow that resolution to be published, but they did permit the Council to proceed. The Vilnius Conference also resolved that a constituent assembly be elected "in conformity with democratic principles by all the inhabitants of Lithuania".

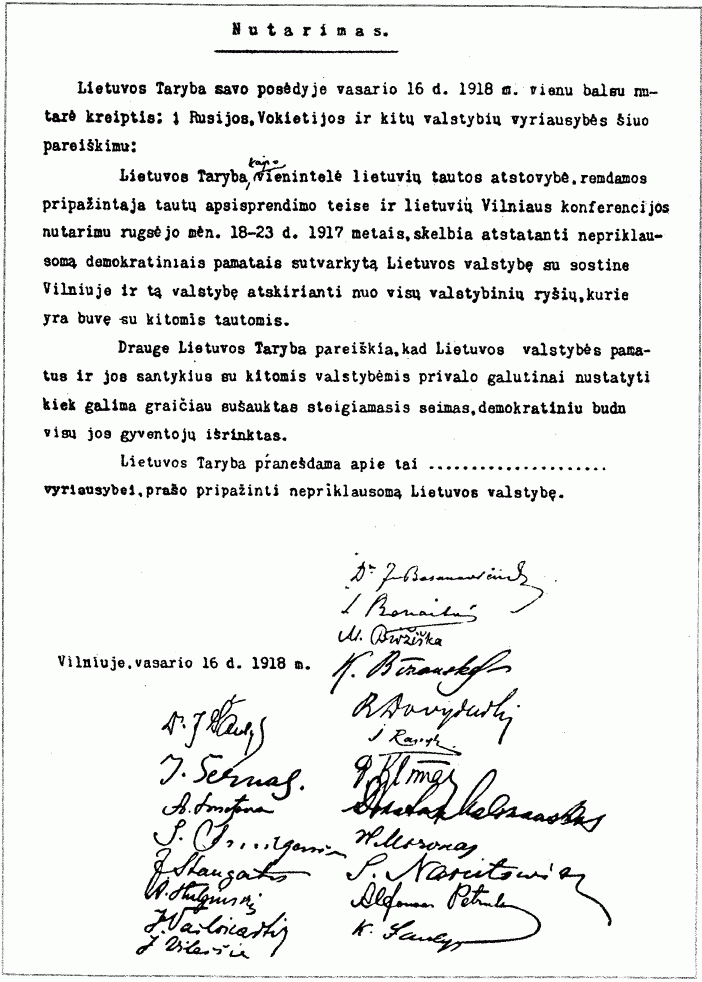
Facsimile of the Act of February 16

== Path to the Act of February 16 ==
=== Act of December 11 ===
The Act of December 11 was the second stage in the progression towards the final Act of Independence. The first draft, demanded by chancellor Georg von Hertling, was prepared by the German Ministry of Foreign Affairs on December 1. Further changes were jointly prepared by the German chancellery and by a delegation of the Council of Lithuania. The delegation's members were Antanas Smetona, Steponas Kairys, Vladas Mironas, Jurgis Šaulys, Petras Klimas and Aleksandras Stulginskis. After discussion amongst the parties, a compromise was reached on the document's text. The German representative, Kurt von Lersner, insisted that not one word be changed in the agreed-upon text and that all the Council members sign the document.

After the delegation returned to Vilnius, a session of the Council was held on December 11 in order to discuss the Act. It was adopted without any further changes. Fifteen voted in favor of the Act, three voted against it, one member abstained, and one did not participate. It is not entirely clear whether every member of the Council signed this document. The Act was written in German, and apparently no official Lithuanian translation was prepared. Therefore, different sources provide slightly different translations. The Act of December 11 pronounced Lithuania's independence, but also asked the German government for protection (clause 2) and called for "a firm and permanent alliance" with Germany. Since the Act specified that the alliance was to be formed based on conventions concerning military affairs, transportation, customs, and currency, many Lithuanians argued that the Council had overstepped its authority: the September resolution adopted by the Vilnius Conference clearly demanded that a constituent assembly decide these crucial matters of state.

=== Act of January 8 ===
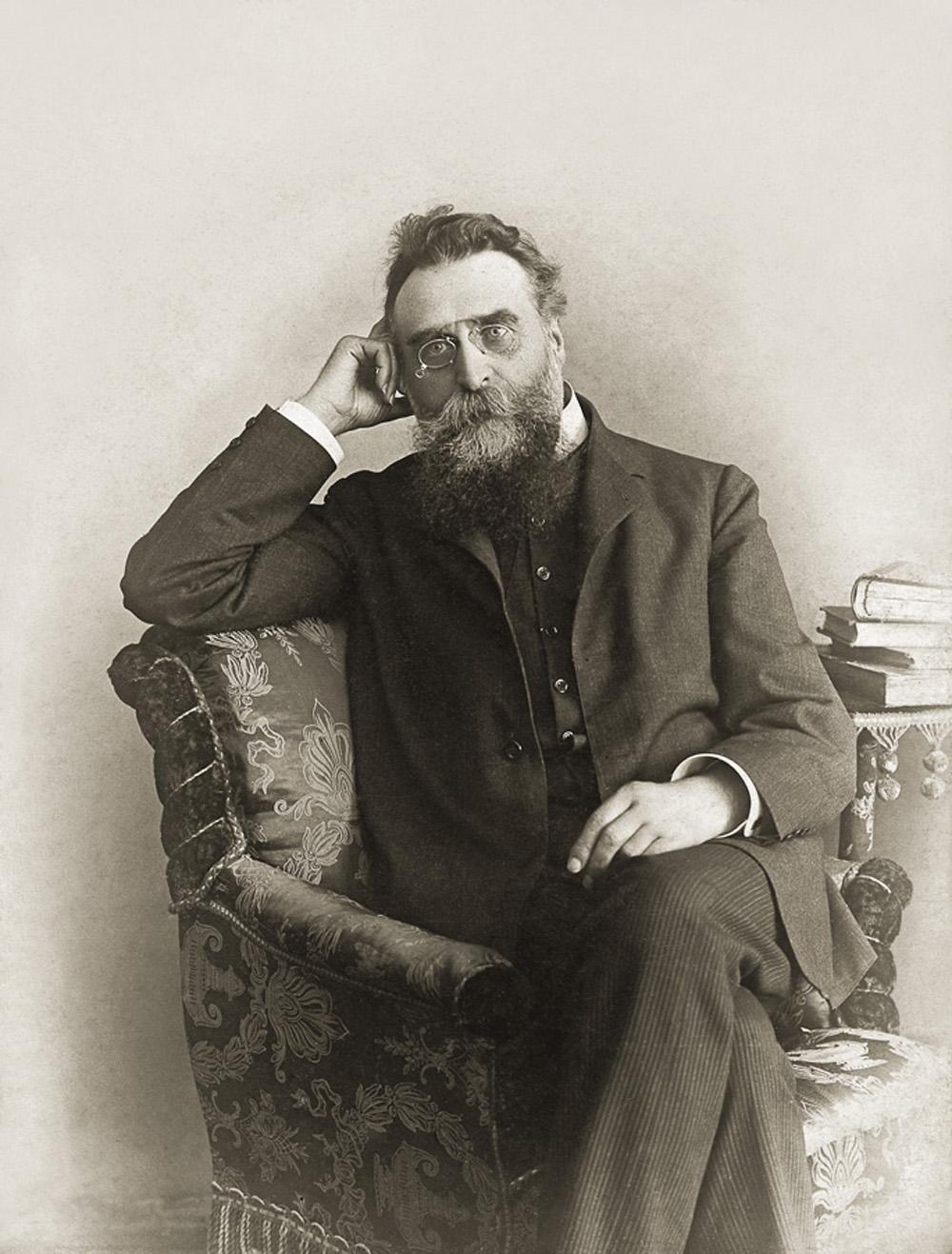
Jonas Basanavičius, the chairman of the Council when the Act of February 16 was signed

When peace talks started between Germany and Russia in 1918, German authorities asked the Lithuanian representatives to prepare two notifications of independence—one for Russia, in which Lithuania's ties with Russia would be denounced and nothing would be mentioned about an alliance with Germany, and a version to be released in Germany that would essentially repeat the Act of December 11. The Council decided to amend the first part of the Act of December 11. Petras Klimas included a sentence calling for the Constituent Assembly. Another important development was the statement that democratic principles would be the basis of the new state's governance, something that was declared by the Vilnius Conference, but omitted in the Act of December 11. The second part, mentioning the "firm and permanent alliance with Germany", was completely omitted. Its final version was approved on January 8, 1918, the day that U.S. President Woodrow Wilson announced his Fourteen Points. In its essence, the Act of January 8 did not differ from the Act of February 16.

However, Ober Ost, the German military administration, rejected the changes. On January 26, in compliance with the earlier request, the two versions of the notification were approved, but they did not include the changes of January 8. The texts were prepared based on the Act of December 11. These concessions to the Germans created tensions among the council members. Four members – Mykolas Biržiška, Steponas Kairys, Stanisław Narutowicz and Jonas Vileišis – resigned from the Council in protest. Chairman Antanas Smetona, who supported the Act of December 11, stepped down. Jonas Basanavičius, who would later be called the patriarch of independence, was elected chairman.

=== Act of February 16 ===
Germany failed to recognize Lithuania as an independent state, and the Lithuanian delegation was not invited to the Brest-Litovsk negotiations that started on December 22, 1917, between the Central Powers and Russia in order to settle territorial claims. During the first and final official joint session between the Council and the German authorities, it was made clear that the Council would serve only as an advisory board. This situation gave additional backing to those Council members who were seeking independence without any ties to other countries. The prime concern at this point was to invite back those members who had left the Council. Negotiations were undertaken that led to the reformulation of previous versions of the Act.

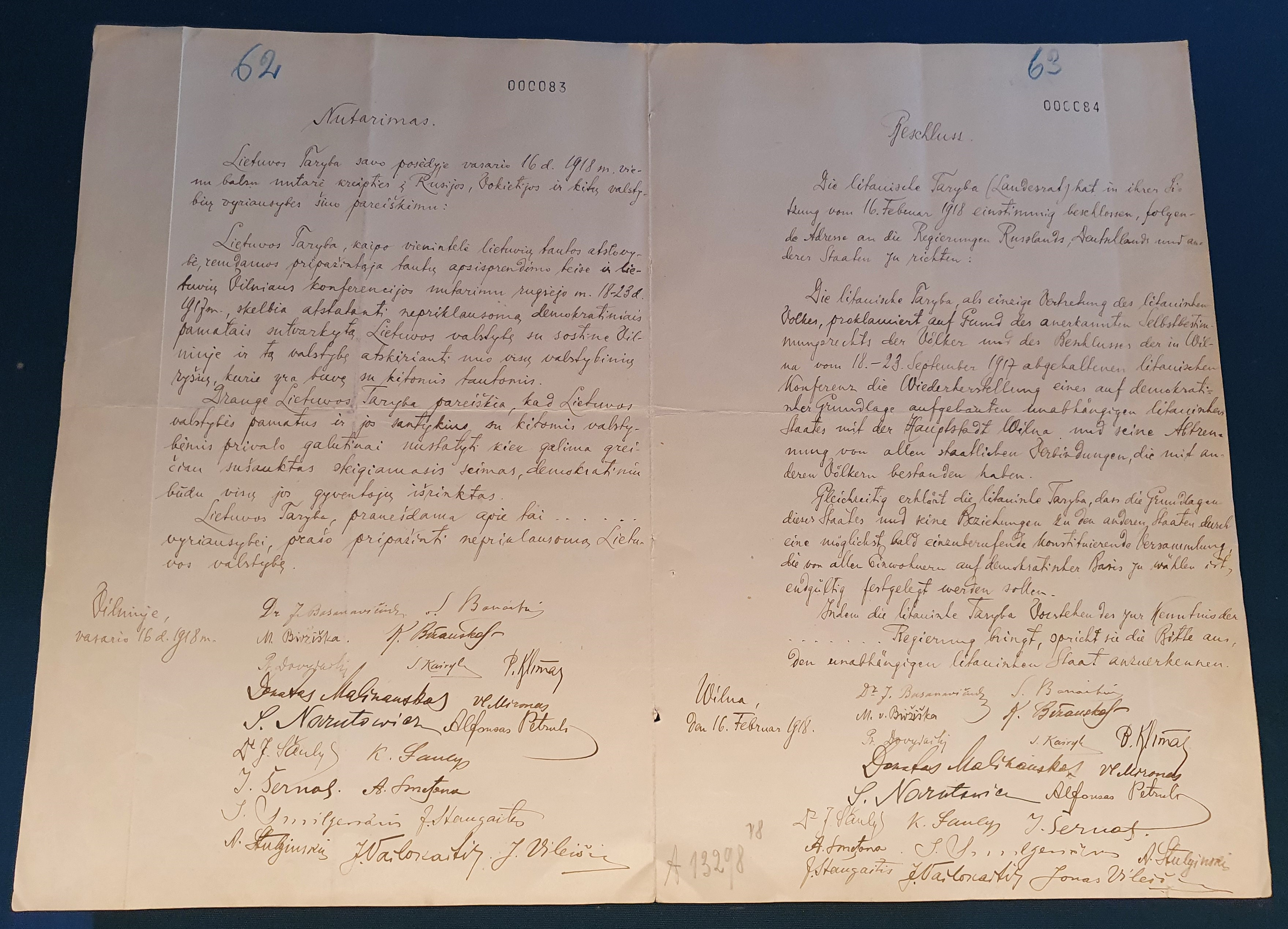
Hand-written originals of the Act of Independence of Lithuania in the Lithuanian (left) and German languages (right), exhibited in 2022

The four withdrawn members demanded that the Council return to the Act of January 8 and omit the mention of any alliance with Germany. After heated debates that lasted for several weeks, on February 15, at 10 am, the new revision of the Act was ready. It included, with minor stylistic changes, the wording of the Act of January 8 and promulgation and notification, drafted on February 1. Promulgation and notification do not carry legal weight and do not change the meaning of a legal document. The Council, including the withdrawn members, was invited to return the next day for its finalization. On the next day, February 16, 1918, at 12:30 pm, all twenty Council members met in the room of the Lithuanian Committee for Support of the War Victims, at 30 Didžioji Street in Vilnius. The building has since been known as the House of the Signatories (Lithuanian: signatarų namai) and houses a museum. The Council first voted to approve the first part, the first two paragraphs up to the word drauge, of the Act. This section was approved unanimously. The second part, however, did not receive support from the four withdrawn members because they were not satisfied with the word "finally" in describing the duties of the Constituent Assembly (in "... the foundation of the Lithuanian State and its relations with other countries will be finally determined by the Constituent Assembly ..."). They were afraid that this word would give a pretext for the Council to usurp the powers of the Constituent Assembly, while the majority argued that the word simply expressed the non-negotiable and non-appealable nature of the future Assembly's decisions. Therefore, the Act was unanimously approved en bloc but did not have full-fledged support from all twenty men.

== Final text of the Act ==
| Line | Original text | | English translation |
|---|---|---|---|---|
| 1 | NUTARIMAS | | RESOLUTION |
| 2 | Lietuvos Taryba savo posėdyje vasario 16 d. 1918 m. vienu balsu nu- | | The Council of Lithuania in its session of February 16, 1918, decided unanimously |
| 3 | tarė kreiptis: į Rusijos, Vokietijos ir kitų valstybių vyriausybės šiuo | | to address the governments of Russia, Germany, and other states with the following |
| 4 | pareiškimu: | | declaration: |
| 5 | Lietuvos Taryba, kaipo vienintelė lietuvių tautos atstovybė, remdamos | | The Council of Lithuania, as the sole representative of the Lithuanian nation, based on |
| 6 | pripažintaja tautų apsisprendimo teise ir lietuvių Vilniaus konferencijos | | the recognized right to national self-determination, and on the Vilnius Conference's |
| 7 | nutarimu rugsėjo mėn. 18–23 d. 1917 metais, skelbia atstatanti nepriklau- | | resolution of September 18–23, 1917, proclaims the restoration of the independent |
| 8 | somą demokratiniais pamatais sutvarkytą Lietuvos valstybę su sostine | | state of Lithuania, founded on democratic principles, with Vilnius as its capital, |
| 9 | Vilniuje ir tą valstybę atskirianti nuo visų valstybinių ryšių, kurie | | and declares the termination of all state ties which formerly |
| 10 | yra buvę su kitomis tautomis. | | bound this State to other nations. |
| 11 | Drauge Lietuvos Taryba pareiškia, kad Lietuvos valstybės pama- | | The Council of Lithuania also declares that the foundation of the Lithuanian State and |
| 12 | tus ir jos santykius su kitomis valstybėmis privalo galutinai nustatyti | | its relations with other countries will be finally determined by the |
| 13 | kiek galima graičiau sušauktas steigiamasis seimas, demokratiniu būdu | | Constituent Assembly, to be convoked as soon as possible, elected democratically |
| 14 | visų jos gyventojų išrinktas. | | by all its inhabitants. |
| 15 | Lietuvos Taryba pranešdama apie tai ..................... | | The Council of Lithuania by informing the Government of ..................... to this effect |
| 16 | vyriausybei, prašo pripažinti nepriklausomą Lietuvos valstybę. | | requests the recognition of the Independent State of Lithuania. |
| 17 | | Dr. Jonas Basanavičius | | Dr. Jonas Basanavičius |
| 18 | | Saliamonas Banaitis | | Saliamonas Banaitis |
| 19 | | Mykolas Biržiška | | Mykolas Biržiška |
| 20 | Vilniuje, vasario 16 d. 1918 m. | Kazys Bizauskas | In Vilnius, February 16, 1918 | Kazys Bizauskas |
| 21 | | Pranas Dovydaitis | | Pranas Dovydaitis |
| 22 | Jurgis Šaulys | Steponas Kairys | Jurgis Šaulys | Steponas Kairys |
| 23 | Jokūbas Šernas | Petras Klimas | Jokūbas Šernas | Petras Klimas |
| 24 | Antanas Smetona | Donatas Malinauskas | Antanas Smetona | Donatas Malinauskas |
| 25 | Jonas Smilgevičius | Vladas Mironas | Jonas Smilgevičius | Vladas Mironas |
| 26 | Justinas Staugaitis | Stanisław Narutowicz | Justinas Staugaitis | Stanisław Narutowicz |
| 27 | Aleksandras Stulginskis | Alfonsas Petrulis | Aleksandras Stulginskis | Alfonsas Petrulis |
| 28 | Jonas Vailokaitis | Kazimieras Steponas Šaulys | Jonas Vailokaitis | Kazimieras Steponas Šaulys |
| 29 | Jonas Vileišis | | Jonas Vileišis |

== Path to the Act ==
Note: the colors of the functional sections correspond to the colored lines in the original text above.

Part I
Resolution of Vilnius Conference; September 18–23, 1917
Part II
Part I
Act of December 11, 1917
Part II
Edited in session | Edited by Petras Klimas
Act of January 8, 1918 | Disposition | Clause
Edited by Steponas Kairys, Stanisław Narutowicz, Jonas Vileišis
Draft of February 1, 1918 | Promulgation | Disposition | Clause | Notification
Edited by the Council and four withdrawn members
Draft of February 15, 1918 | Promulgation | Disposition | Clause | Notification
Edited by Petras Klimas
Act of Independence of Lithuania; Act of February 16, 1918 | Promulgation | Disposition | Clause | Notification | Eschatocol
Source: Klimavičius, Raimundas (2004). "Vasario 16-osios aktas: teksto formavimo šaltiniai ir autorystės problema". Istorija. Lietuvos aukštųjų mokyklų mokslo darbai (in Lithuanian) (59–60). Vilnius Pedagogical University: 65. ISSN 1392-0456. Archived from the original on September 26, 2007.

== Aftermath ==
=== Lithuania ===
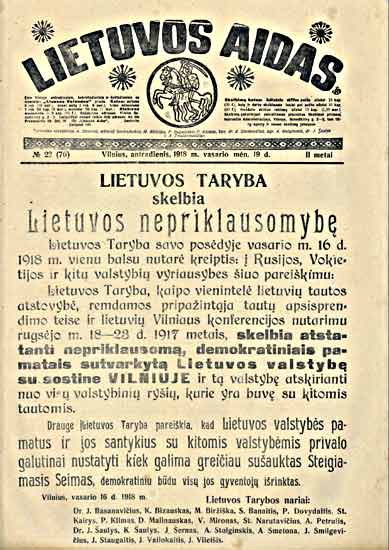
The front page of Lietuvos aidas with the text of the Act. The bulk of the issue was confiscated by German authorities.

Soon after the signing, the Act was taken to Germany and handed to parties in the Reichstag. On February 18, the text was reprinted in German newspapers, including Das Neue Litauen, Vossische Zeitung, Tägliche Rundschau and Kreuzzeitung. In Lithuania a text of the proclamation was prepared for printing in newspapers, particularly in Lietuvos aidas, the Council's newspaper established by Antanas Smetona; but the German authorities prohibited this publication. Although the majority of the copies of the issue were confiscated, the newspaper's editor, Petras Klimas, managed to hide about 60 of them.

On March 3, 1918, Germany and the now-Bolshevik Russia signed the Treaty of Brest-Litovsk. It declared that the Baltic nations were in the German interest zone and that Russia renounced any claims to them. On March 23, Germany recognized independent Lithuania on the basis of the December 11 declaration. However, in substance, nothing had changed either in Lithuania or in the Council's status: any efforts to establish an administration were hindered. This situation changed when the German Revolution started and Germany lost the war in the fall of 1918 – it was no longer in a position to dictate terms. The Council of Lithuania adopted the first provisional constitution on November 2. The functions of government were entrusted to a three-member presidium, and Augustinas Voldemaras was invited to form the first Cabinet of Ministers of Lithuania. Complete international recognition took several years; the US affirmed it on July 28, 1922.

=== The Act ===
Two copies of the Act were signed: the original and a duplicate. The original was given to Jonas Basanavičius to safeguard and protect. The original was never published or used in any public matters; its existence was first mentioned in the press in 1933. The duplicate was used in day-to-day business and was stored in the president's archives until June 15, 1940, the day when Lithuania received an ultimatum from the Soviet Union and lost its independence. After that date the document disappeared. Both the original and the duplicate were missing for decades; historians and adventurers hunted for them. In 2006, a team of engineers searched the walls of the former house of Petras Vileišis. Two facsimiles of the duplicate were produced, one in 1928 and the other in 1933. The 1928 facsimile is a closer reproduction of the Act in its original state. It contains spelling errors and the background is visually "noisy", while the 1933 facsimile shows the Act in an "improved" condition.

In 2017, Lithuanian businessman Darius Mockus offered a 1-million-Euro reward to anyone who could find the original document and give it to the State of Lithuania. The offer's deadline was set to February 16, 2018, when Lithuania will commemorate the 100th anniversary of its declaration of independence. On March 29, 2017, Vytautas Magnus University professor Liudas Mažylis announced he had found the original document in the Federal Foreign Office Political Archive in Berlin, Germany, hand-written in the Lithuanian language and signed by the twenty. He also announced that he had found the German-language version of the February 16, 1918 document and the Act of December 11, 1917. The latter displays nineteen signatures (without that of Pranas Dovydaitis). Germany confirmed the documents' authenticity on the following day and they were displayed publicly by two officials – Michael Roth, the German Minister of State for Europe, and Deividas Matulionis, Lithuania ambassador in Germany. On October 7, 2017, Lithuania Minister of Foreign Affairs Linas Linkevičius and Germany Minister of Foreign Affairs Sigmar Gabriel signed an agreement that the original Act of Independence will be displayed for five years in the House of the Signatories where it was originally signed, making it the main symbol of the Lithuania's Centenary of the Restoration of the State celebrations. On December 22, 2017, experts from the Lithuanian Police Forensic Research Center after a thorough analysis announced that the hand-written act was written by one of the signatories Jurgis Šaulys hand.

On December 22, 2017, yet another version of the Act of Independence of Lithuania was found by historian Darius Antanavičius in the Vatican Secret Archives that was sent to the Holy See. This version of the Act was printed in German language and signed by Antanas Smetona, Jonas Vileišis, Jurgis Šaulys and Justinas Staugaitis.

=== Signatories ===
Most of the signatories of the Act remained active in the cultural and political life of independent Lithuania. Jonas Vileišis served in the Seimas and as mayor of Kaunas, temporary capital of Lithuania; Saliamonas Banaitis was involved in finance, opening several banks. Among the signatories were two future Presidents of Lithuania, Antanas Smetona and Aleksandras Stulginskis. Jonas Basanavičius, chairman of the Council of Lithuania, returned to an academic life, pursuing his research in Lithuanian culture and folklore. Five signatories died before World War II started; three died during the Nazi occupation. Those who did not emigrate to Western countries became political prisoners after Lithuania was occupied by the Soviet Union.

Aleksandras Stulginskis and Petras Klimas were sent to prison in Siberia by Soviet authorities, but survived and returned to Lithuania; Pranas Dovydaitis and Vladas Mironas were also sent to Siberia but died there. Kazys Bizauskas disappeared during the summer of 1941 while being transported to a Soviet prison in Minsk; he is presumed to have been shot along with a number of other prisoners. Donatas Malinauskas was deported to Russia on June 14, 1941, during the massive June deportation.

Several of the surviving signatories emigrated. Jurgis Šaulys and Kazimieras Steponas Šaulys died in Switzerland. Antanas Smetona, Mykolas Biržiška, and Steponas Kairys emigrated to the United States and are buried there.

== Legacy ==
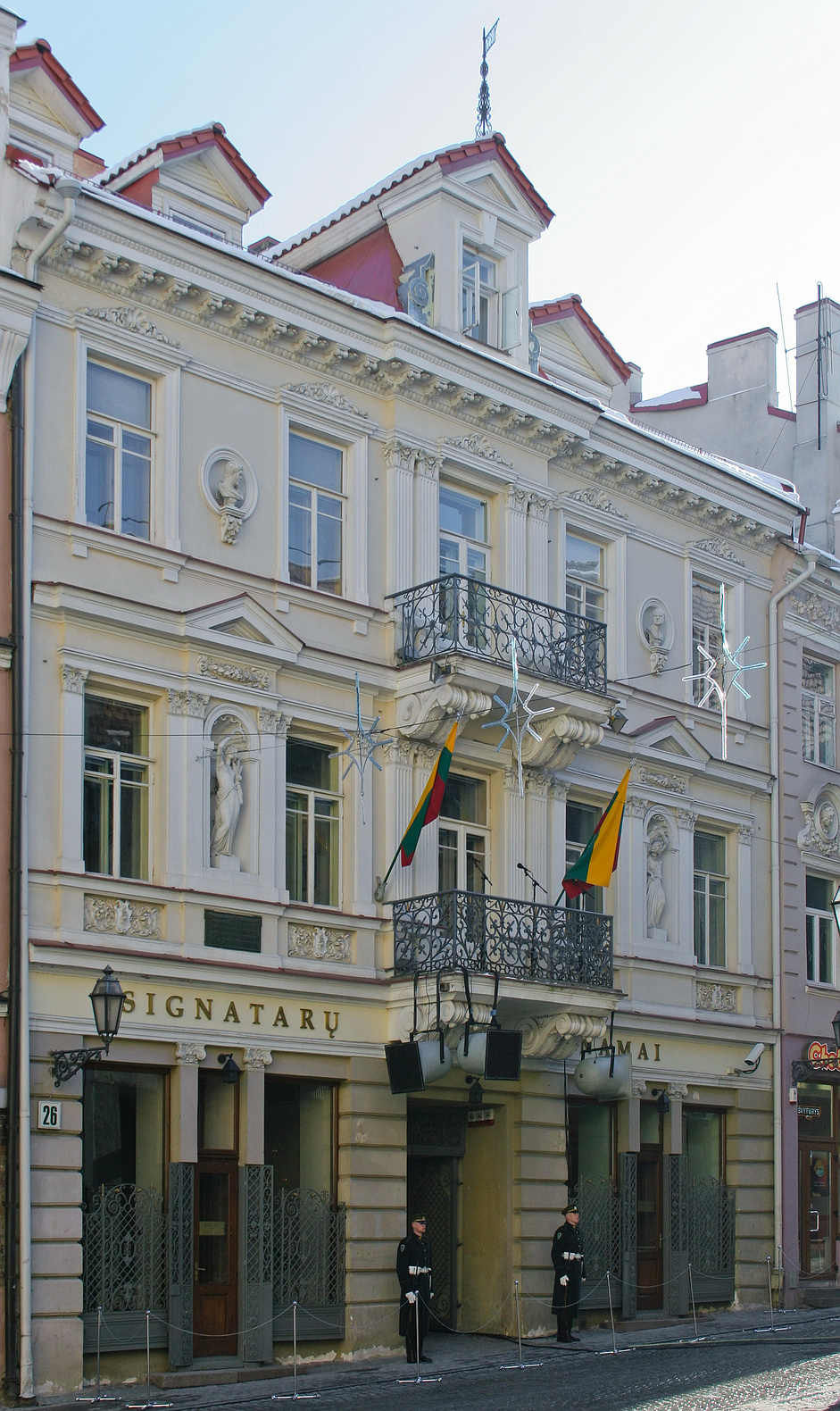
The House of the Signatories on February 16, 2007

The Act of February 16, proclaimed the re-establishment (atstatyti) of the Lithuanian state, making it the successor to the Lithuanian historical state, the Grand Duchy of Lithuania. In this respect the Council deviated from the resolution adopted by the Vilnius Conference which called for establishment (sudaryti) of a Lithuanian state. However, it was made clear that the new state would be quite different from the old Duchy: it was to be organized only in ethnic Lithuanian lands (except for the Vilnius region which was majority Polish) and was to be governed by democratic principles, as opposed to the multi-ethnic Duchy that had been ruled by an aristocracy. The termination of the ties binding Lithuania to other states was addressed to Germany, Russia, and Poland, all of which had their own plans for the country. Even though not addressed directly, the Act renounced any attempt to resurrect the former Polish–Lithuanian union.

The Act of February 16, 1918, is the legal basis for the existence of present-day Lithuania, both during the interwar period and since 1990. The Act became one of the key elements during the restoration of Lithuania's independence from the Soviet Union in 1990. A paragraph in the Act of the Re-Establishment of the State of Lithuania, delivered on March 11, 1990, stated:

The Act of Independence of February 16, 1918 of the Council of Lithuania and the Constituent Assembly (Seimas) decree of 15 May 1920 on the re-established democratic State of Lithuania never lost their legal effect and comprise the constitutional foundation of the State of Lithuania.

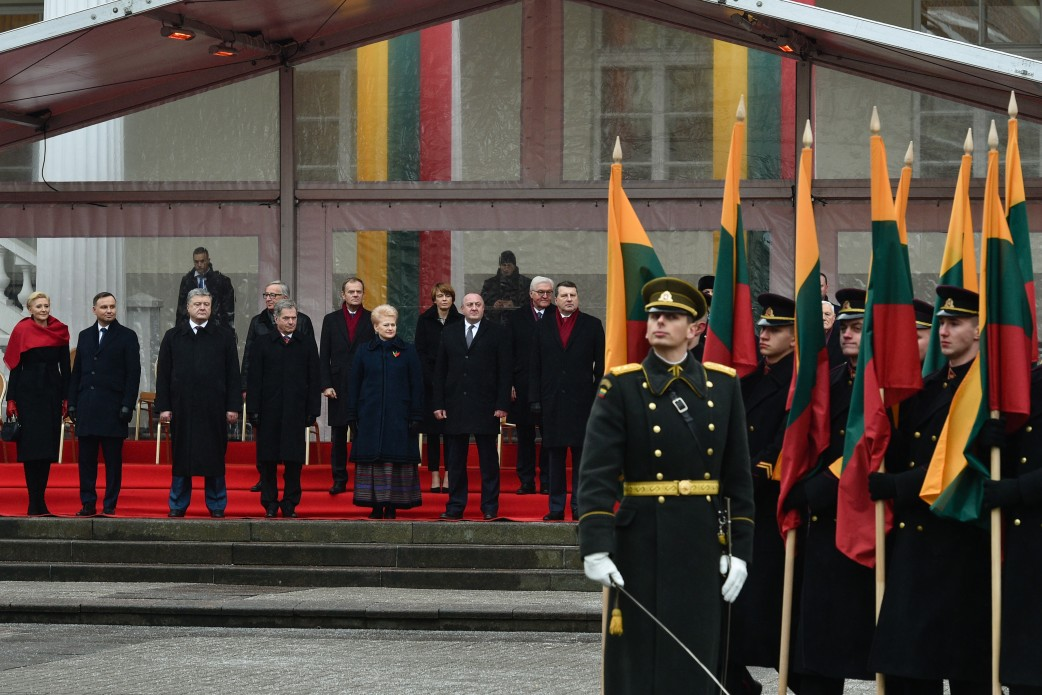
Celebrations of the 100th anniversary of the restoration of statehood of Lithuania with foreign leaders (Vilnius, 2018)

This formulation emphasized the continuity of the two legal Acts. The Act of February 16, 1918, and its successor, the Act of March 11, 1990, are regarded as two of the most important developments of Lithuanian society in the 20th century.

February 16 in Lithuania is an official holiday. On this day various ceremonies are hosted all across Lithuania. The 2014 commemoration included laying flowers at the signatories' graves in Rasos Cemetery, awarding the Lithuanian National Prize, the hoisting of the three Baltic States's flags at Daukantas Square, dedicated concerts at Cathedral Square in Vilnius and at the Lithuanian National Philharmonic Society hall, and the lighting of 16 fires along Gediminas Avenue.

In 1992, an award was established in honor of Jonas Basanavičius, who led the Council of Lithuania when the Act of February 16 was signed. The Jonas Basanavičius Prize is bestowed for distinguished work within the previous five years in the fields of ethnic and cultural studies.

== See also ==
- Kingdom of Lithuania (1918)
- Act of the Re-Establishment of the State of Lithuania, the Act of March 11, 1990
- Centennial of the Restored State of Lithuania
