= Vilnius Conference =

1917 meeting that elected the Council of Lithuania

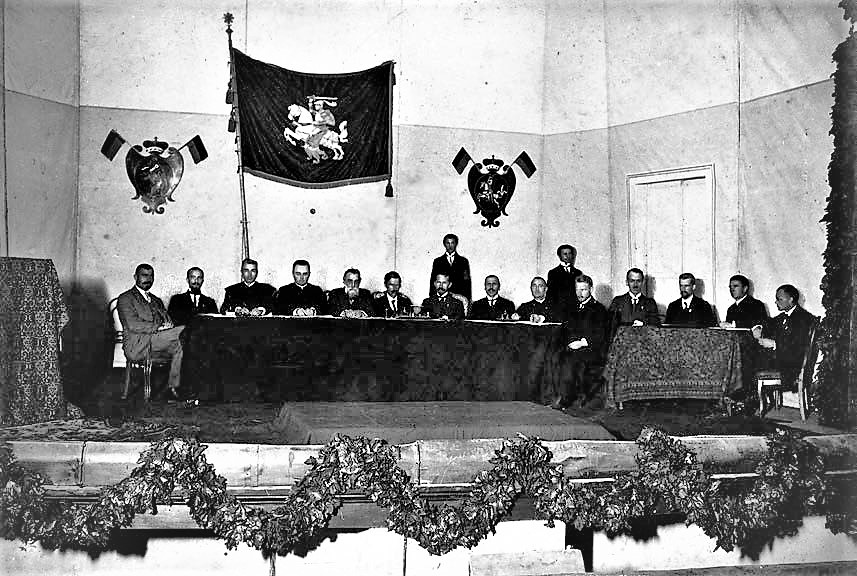
Presidium and secretariat of the Vilnius Conference. The hall was decorated with small two-color (red and green) flags (three are visible in the picture). This was one of the suggestions for the Flag of Lithuania. The delegates decided it was too dark and gloomy and eventually a yellow stripe was added.

In the history of Lithuania, the Vilnius Conference (Lithuanian: Vilniaus konferencija) or Vilnius National Conference met on 18–22 September 1917, and began the process of establishing a Lithuanian state based on ethnic identity and language that would be independent of the Russian Empire, Poland, and the German Empire. It elected the twenty-member Council of Lithuania that was entrusted with the mission of declaring and re-establishing an independent Lithuania. The conference, hoping to express the will of the Lithuanian people, gave legal authority to the council and its decisions. While the conference laid the basic guiding principles of Lithuanian independence, it deferred any matters of the political structure of future Lithuania to the Constituent Assembly, which would later be elected in a democratic manner.

== Historical background ==
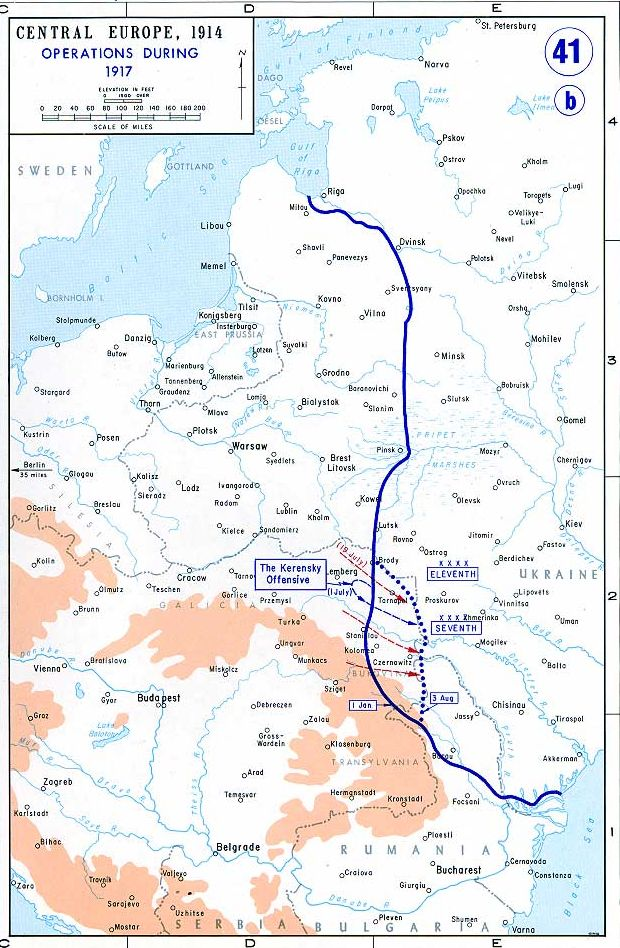
Eastern Front in 1917

Lithuania existed as an independent state from the beginning of the 13th century until 1569, when it entered into a union with Poland, forming the Polish–Lithuanian Commonwealth. The Commonwealth ceased to exist after the Partitions of the Polish–Lithuanian Commonwealth in the late 18th century. Most of the Lithuanian territory was incorporated into the Russian Empire. A Lithuanian independence movement arose during the 19th century, based on concepts of national self-determination that were formalized in Woodrow Wilson's Fourteen Points speech in January 1918.

During the course of World War I, the Imperial German Army invaded the Russian Empire and soon entered the territory which comprised Lithuania. In 1915, the Germans assumed control and organized a military administration known as Ober Ost (short for der Oberbefehlshaber der gesamten deutschen Streitkräfte im Osten: "supreme command of all German forces in the East"). At first, the Germans simply exploited Lithuania for the benefit of their war effort. As the war progressed, it became evident that the two-front war that Germany was engaged in would necessitate a compromise peace with the Russian Empire. This necessitated a re-thinking of strategies concerning the occupied territories in the east. An openly pursued goal of annexation gave way to a more guarded policy after Germany perceived that a public relations backlash might occur: the Central Powers realized that the Allies could use such territorial expansion in their propaganda. Lengthy debates between German military leaders (who favored open annexation) and the civilian administration (which leaned towards a more subtle strategy) resulted in a resolution that declared that the military administration governing occupied territories would grant some semblance of autonomy to their populations. The plan was to form a network of formally independent states that would in fact be completely dependent on Germany, the so-called Mitteleuropa.

== Organizing the conference ==
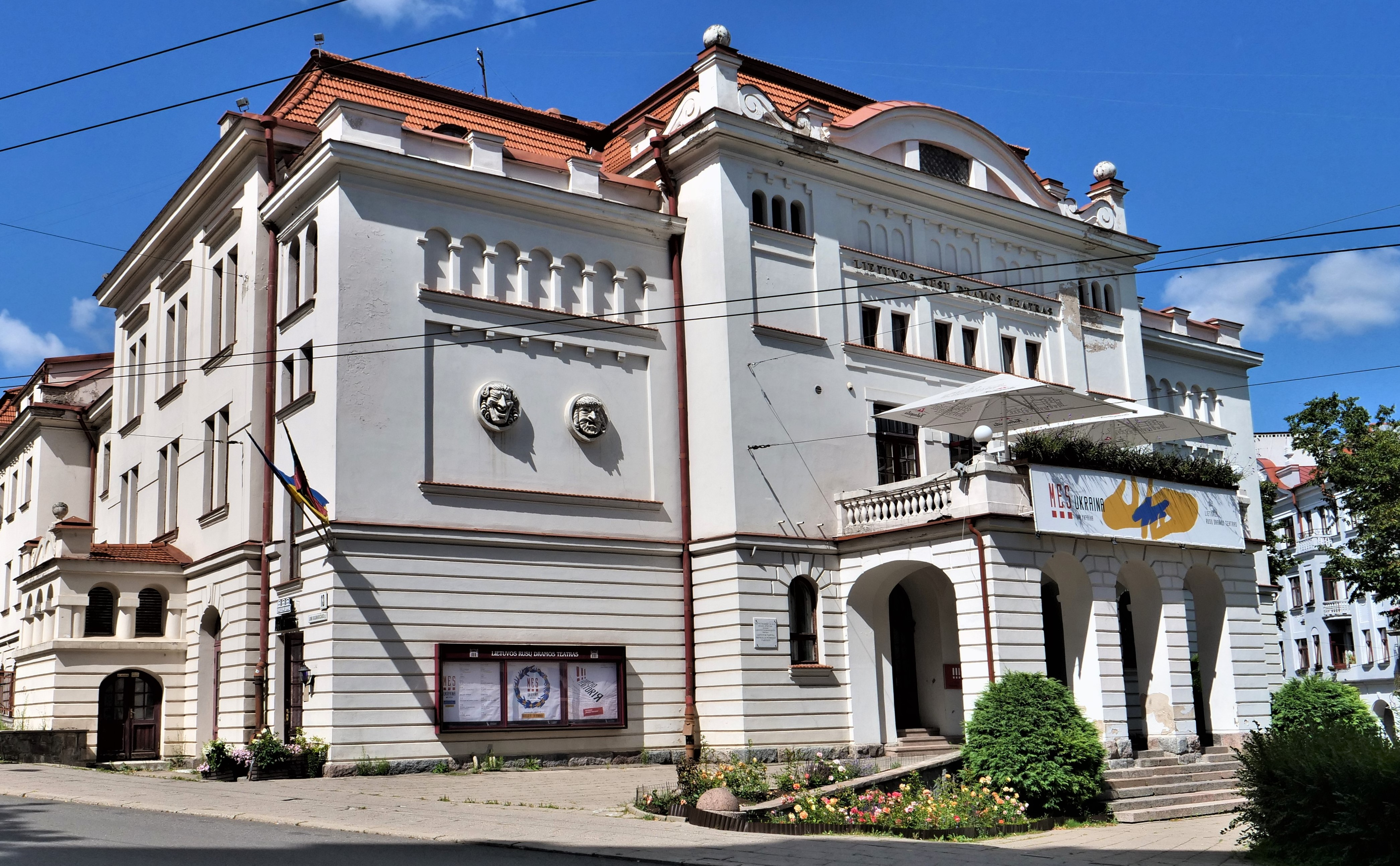
Venue of the Vilnius Conference (present-day Old Theatre of Vilnius)

A Vertrauensrat ("Council of Trust" or "Confidential Council") was authorized in May 1917; its membership was to consist of Lithuanians and ethnic minorities in Lithuania. The military administration approached a number of prominent members of the Lithuanian community, including Bishop Pranciškus Karevičius, Antanas Smetona, and Jonas Basanavičius, all of whom refused to participate in their rubber stamp advisory council. The Lithuanian Society for the Relief of War Sufferers, an organization that helped war victims and mobilized political activists, then entered into negotiations between the Lithuanians and the occupational authorities. The Committee demanded that the Germans agree to permit a national convention, elected directly by the people. After lengthy negotiations, the parties reached an agreement that a conference could convene that would represent the Lithuanian aspirations; however no elections were allowed to take place.

The Organizing Committee of the Conference (Ausschuss) met in Vilnius on 1–4 August 1917. At the start of the meeting, the military authorities presented an ultimatum that any future conferences would need to declare loyalty to Germany and agree to annexation. Since no elections had been held the representatives had to be invited by the Organizing Committee, which included Mykolas Biržiška, Petras Klimas, Antanas Smetona, Jonas Stankevičius, and Jurgis Šaulys. The Committee strove to choose representatives from a wide political, professional, and social spectrum. In total 264 representatives were selected, five to eight from each county (Lithuanian: apskritis). 213 of them attended the conference that convened on 18 September 1917. Later, the number grew to 222. They included 66 priests, 65 farmers, 59 intellectuals, 5 nobles, 2 workers, and 24 people with unknown background.

== Proceedings ==
The meetings of the conference were held behind closed doors and no German representatives participated. A number of speeches were delivered during the early sessions of the council that denounced the German occupation, mentioning forced labor, heavy requisitions, and rampant deforestation. The Conference, however, concentrated on three main questions:

1. The future of Lithuania and its national minorities;
2. Lithuania's relations with Germany;
3. Election of the Council of Lithuania.

=== Future of Lithuania and national minorities ===
In regard to the future of Lithuania, the conference announced that an independent state, based on democratic principles, needed to be declared. In response to various schemes to re-create the old Grand Duchy of Lithuania or Polish–Lithuanian Commonwealth, the new state was to be created only in the lands, that were assumed to be ethnically Lithuanian. Lacking real powers to represent the nation (the conference was not democratically elected by the citizens), it did not specify the foundations of the state or relationships with other countries. These were to be decided by the Constituent Assembly, elected by popular vote. These three principles were echoed by the Council of Lithuania when it declared the Act of Independence of Lithuania.

The national minorities were promised freedom for their cultural needs. In later years national minorities were granted the same rights as Lithuanians and in some cases extra representation in the government: after the war ended, the Council of Lithuania was expanded to include Jewish and Belarusian representatives; the first governments of Lithuania included Ministries for Jewish and Belarusian affairs; in 1920 the Jewish community was granted national and cultural autonomy with the right to legislate binding ordinances; the Russian Orthodox Church received financial support from the government; Germans, concentrated in the disputed Klaipėda Region, were also granted autonomy. The only sizeable group that did not have extra representation was the Polish minority because of intense conflicts over the Vilnius Region.

=== Relations with Germany ===
In response to the ultimatum by the Germans, the following resolution was adopted:

If Germany agrees to proclaim the state of Lithuania before the Peace Conference and to support the needs of Lithuania at the Peace Conference, then the Lithuanian Conference, bearing in mind that in normal conditions of peace the interests of Lithuania incline not so much to the East or to the South as to the West, recognizes the possibility for the future state of Lithuania to enter into a certain relationship, still to be determined, with Germany, without harming its own independent development.

East, South, and West in this context referred to Russia, Poland, and Germany, respectively. This carefully balanced passage was a response to German demands to declare loyalty to Germany. It did not please the Germans and they did not allow the publication of the resolution.

=== Council of Lithuania ===
At the end of the proceedings, the conference elected twenty members to the Council of Lithuania to act as the executive authority of the Lithuanian people. The council was empowered to carry out the resolution adopted by the conference, i.e. to negotiate with the Germans and declare an independent Lithuania. The Social Democratic members of the conference were dissatisfied with the composition of this council, since it included only two members of that party, and of the twenty members, six were Roman Catholic priests. Two of the priests then resigned; their places were taken by Stanisław Narutowicz and Jonas Vileišis. Five months later, on 16 February 1918, the Council of Lithuania issued the Act of Independence of Lithuania.

== See also ==
- Second Conference of the State of Lithuania
