= Lithuanian literature =

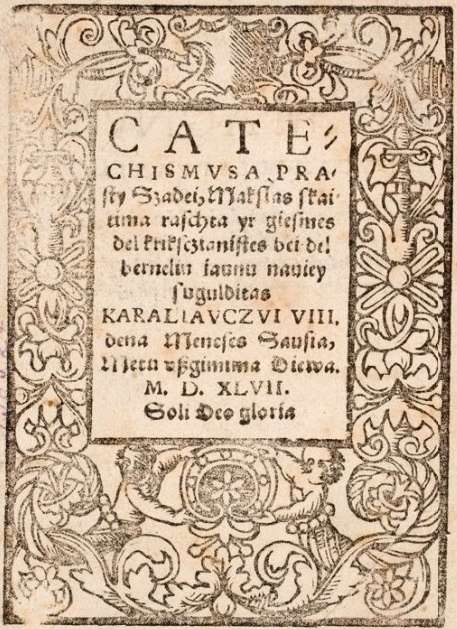
First Lithuanian book (1547) The Simple Words of Catechism by Martynas Mažvydas

Lithuanian literature (Lithuanian: lietuvių literatūra) concerns the art of written works created by Lithuanians throughout their history.

== History ==
=== Latin language ===
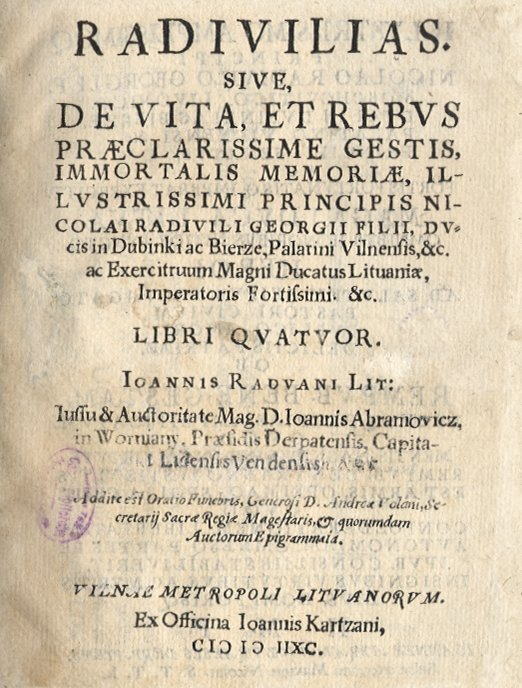
The title page of Radivilias (1592, Vilnius). The poem celebrating commander Mikalojus Radvila Rudasis (1512–1584) and recounts the famous victory of Lithuanian armed forces over Moscow troops (1564).

A wealth of Lithuanian literature was written in Latin, the main scholarly language in the Middle Ages. The edicts of the Lithuanian King Mindaugas are the prime example of literature of this kind. The Letters of Gediminas are another crucial heritage of the Lithuanian Latin writings.

One of the first Lithuanian authors who wrote in Latin was Nicolaus Hussovianus (about 1480 – after 1533). His poem Carmen de statura, feritate ac venatione bisontis (A Song about the Appearance, Savagery and Hunting of the Bison), published in 1523, describes the Lithuanian landscape, way of life and customs, touches on existing political problems and reflects the clash of paganism and Christianity.

Joannes Vislicensis (1485–1520) wrote Bellum Prutenum (Prussian war), an epic poem which was dedicated to the Battle of Grunwald against the Teutonic order.

A person under the pseudonym Michalo Lituanus (about 1490 – 1560) wrote a treatise De moribus tartarorum, lituanorum et moscorum (On the Customs of Tatars, Lithuanians and Muscovites) in the middle of the 16th century, but it was not published until 1615.

Petrus Roysius (about 1505 – 1571), was a lawyer and poet of Spanish birth who became an extraordinary figure in the cultural life of Lithuania in the 16th century. Augustinus Rotundus (about 1520 – 1582) was a publicist, lawyer, and mayor of Vilnius, who wrote a history of Lithuania in Latin around the year 1560 (no known manuscript has survived). Jonas Radvanas, a humanist poet of the second half of the 16th century, wrote an epic poem imitating the Aeneid of Vergil. His Radivilias, intended as the Lithuanian national epic, was published in Vilnius in 1588.

Laurentius Boierus (about 1561–1619) was a poet of Swedish descent, who graduated from the University of Vilnius. His main work is Carolomachia – a poem dedicated to the Lithuanian victory over the Swedish Army in the Battle of Kircholm in 1605. The poem was written and published in 1606 - just after one year of the event. The poem celebrated Lithuanian Grand Hetman (polemarchos as referred to in the poem) Jan Karol Chodkiewicz and the Lithuanian army. Many interesting battle details were attested in his poem, also one of the first mentionings of the Lithuanian battle cry - muški! (Latin: caede!, English: defeat!)

Matthias Sarbievius (1595–1640) was a Latin-language poet of Polish birth, graduated from Vilnius University and spent most of his productive years in Lithuania - Vilnius and Kražiai. His European fame came from his first collection of poetry, Lyricorum libri tres (Three Books of Lyrics, 1625). In his book Dii gentium (Gods of The Nations,1627) along with Roman deities he described Lithuanian mythology.

Adam Schröter (1525–1572) wrote a poem in Latin devoted to river Nemunas De fluvio Memela Lithuaniae carmen elegiacum (Elegic songs about Lithuanian river Nemunas).

17th-century Lithuanian scholars also wrote in Latin, which was the common scholarly language in Catholic Europe: Kazimieras Kojelavičius-Vijūkas and Žygimantas Liauksminas are known for their Latin writings in theology, rhetorics and music. Albertas Kojalavičius-Vijūkas wrote the first printed Lithuanian history in two volumes, Historiae Lituanae (1650, 1669). Kazimieras Kojelavičius-Vijūkas was a prolific writer - his legacy counts more than 20 books in Latin.

Maciej Stryjkowski and Augustinus Rotundus were strong proponents of using Latin as the official language of Grand Duchy of Lithuania because they thought that Lithuanian language was just a vernacular language which had developed from Latin. Their belief was based on grammatical similarities between Lithuanian and Latin.

Universitas lingvarum Litvaniae, written in Latin and published in Vilnius, 1737, is the oldest surviving grammar of the Lithuanian language published in the territory of the Grand Duchy of Lithuania.

Latin books of Lithuanian authors were published in Vilnius, Kraków and Riga. In the 16th century alone, 158 Latin books were published in Vilnius. Research reveals 374 books published in the Grand Duchy of Lithuania, or written by citizens of Grand Duchy of Lithuania and published abroad, in the 15th-16th centuries. Although the first printing press in the Grand Duchy of Lithuania was established in Vilnius in 1522, the first Lithuanian who established a printing press was John Lettou in the City of London in 1480.

=== Lithuanian language ===
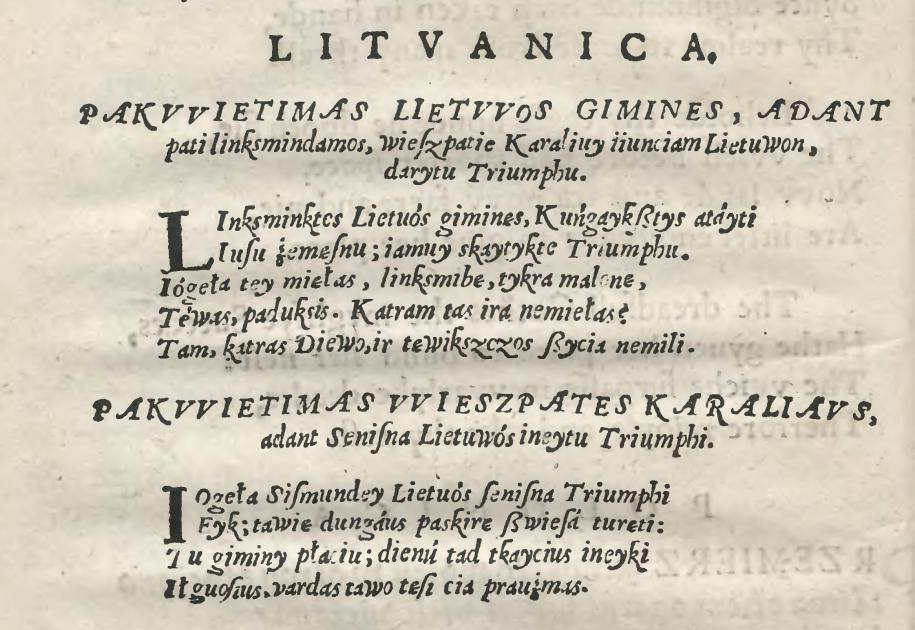
Panegyric to Sigismund III Vasa, visiting Vilnius, first hexameter in Lithuanian language, 1589

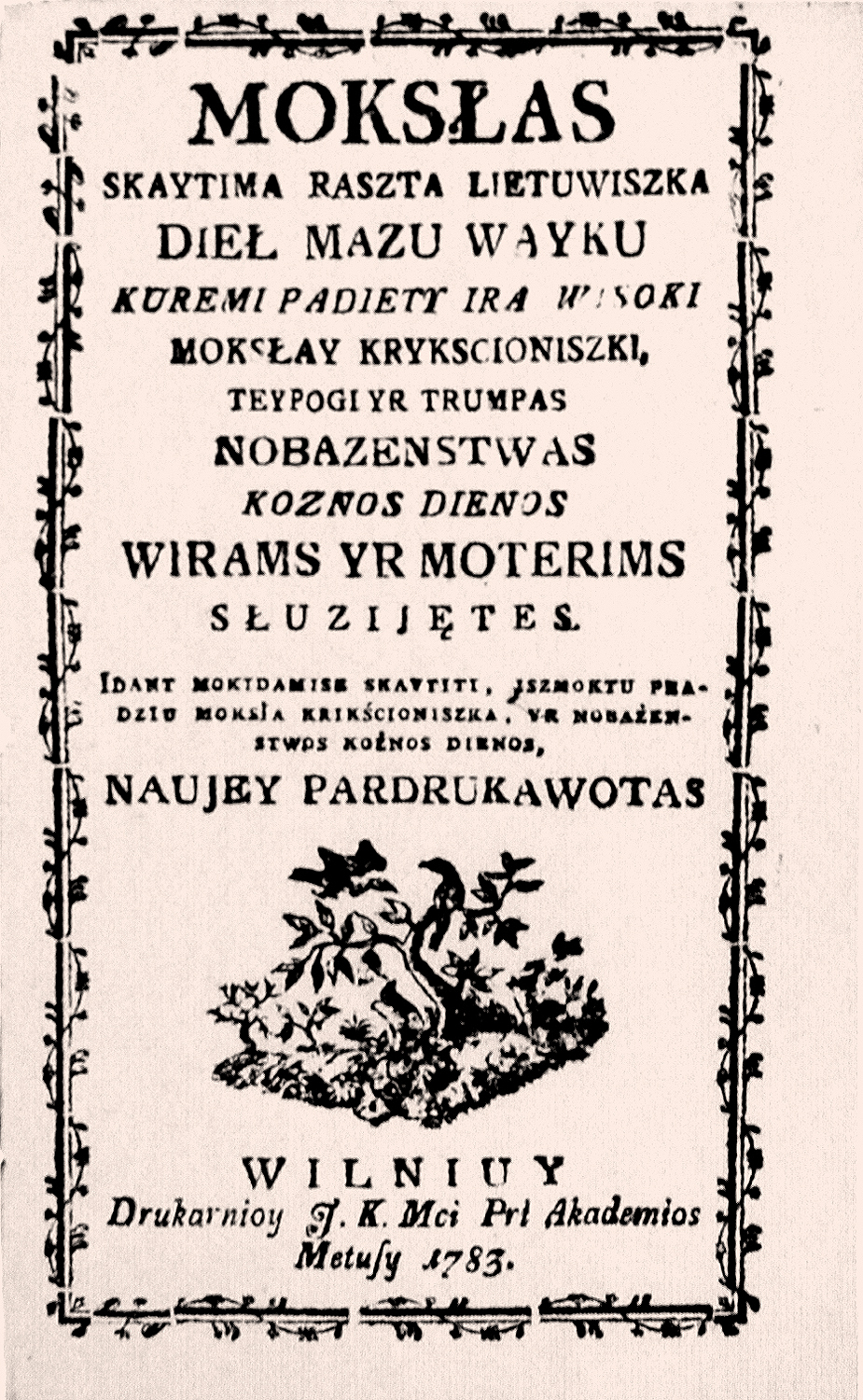
Lithuanian language primer for kids, published in Vilnius, Grand Duchy of Lithuania, 1783 edition

Lithuanian scholars Abraomas Kulvietis (about 1510 – 1545), Stanislovas Rapolionis (1485–1545) were the very first authors to write in the Lithuanian language. Lithuanian literary works in the Lithuanian language were first published in the 16th century. In 1547, Martynas Mažvydas (about 1520–1563) compiled and published the first printed Lithuanian book, The Simple Words of Catechism, which marks the beginning of printed Lithuanian literature. He was followed by Mikalojus Daukša (1527–1613) in Lithuania Propria with his Catechism, or Education Obligatory to Every Christian. In the 16th and 17th centuries, Lithuanian literature was primarily religious. During the Reformation, Catholic and Calvinist supporters in Lithuania competed with each other for influence and education of minds. One example of this - the largest published book in Lithuanian in the 17th century - Calvinist Catechism and collection of psalms Knyga nobažnystės krikščioniškos (The Book of the Christian Piety), patronaged by Jonušas Radvila. During the 18th century, the number of secular publications increased, including dictionaries. The University of Vilnius promoted the usage of the language and the creation of literary works in the first half of the 19th century. But after the partitioning of Polish–Lithuanian Commonwealth, Russia, which controlled most of the Lithuanian territory through its empire, in the mid-19th century announced a 40-year ban on the printing in the Lithuanian language in the Latin alphabet. It feared an uprising from Lithuanian nationalists. As a result, publishing was transferred to East Prussia, and Lithuanian books were delivered to Lithuania by book smugglers. The first Lithuanian secular book was a translation of Aesop's fables - Ezopo pasakėčios (Die Fabeln Aesopi), translated from Latin and published in 1706 by Johann Schultz (1648–1710).

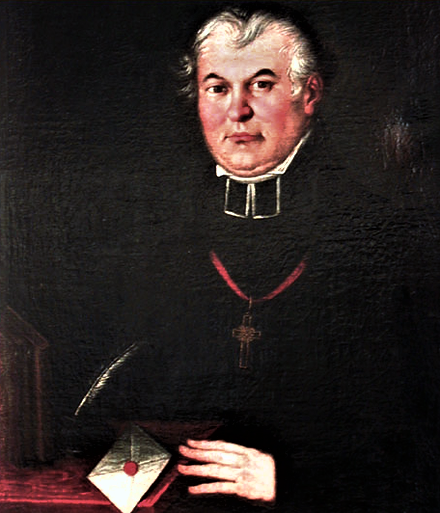
Konstantinas Sirvydas

The Sermon Book of Wolfenbüttel (Volfenbiūtelio postilė) - the manuscript of the Sermon Book of Wolfenbüttel (1573) is the oldest known Lithuanian handwritten book. The author or authors are unknown. The book was found in the Herzog August Library in Wolfenbüttel.

Jonas Bretkūnas (1536–1602) - presumably of Old Prussian descent, a Lutheran pastor, was one of the best-known developers of the written Lithuanian language. He translated the Bible into Lithuanian and was the author of twelve Lithuanian books. His most notable works are Chronicon des Landes Preussen (1578–1579), Postilla, tatai esti trumpas ir prastas išguldimas evangeliu (1591), Kancionalas nekurių giesmių (1589), a manuscript of Lithuanian Bible - Biblia (1590). The Lithuanian language of Bretkūnas is rich and was unmatched till the writings of Kristijonas Donelaitis. It largely influenced the formation of a Lithuanian literary language and writing style.

Konstantinas Sirvydas (1579–1631) religious preacher, lexicographer, published the first volume of a collection of his sermons entitled Punktai Sakymų (Sermons), the purity, style and richness of the Lithuanian language of it are still admired today. His Polish-Latin-Lithuanian dictionary Dictionarium trium linguarum was used up to the 19th century and was highly rated by Lithuanian writers and lexicographers.

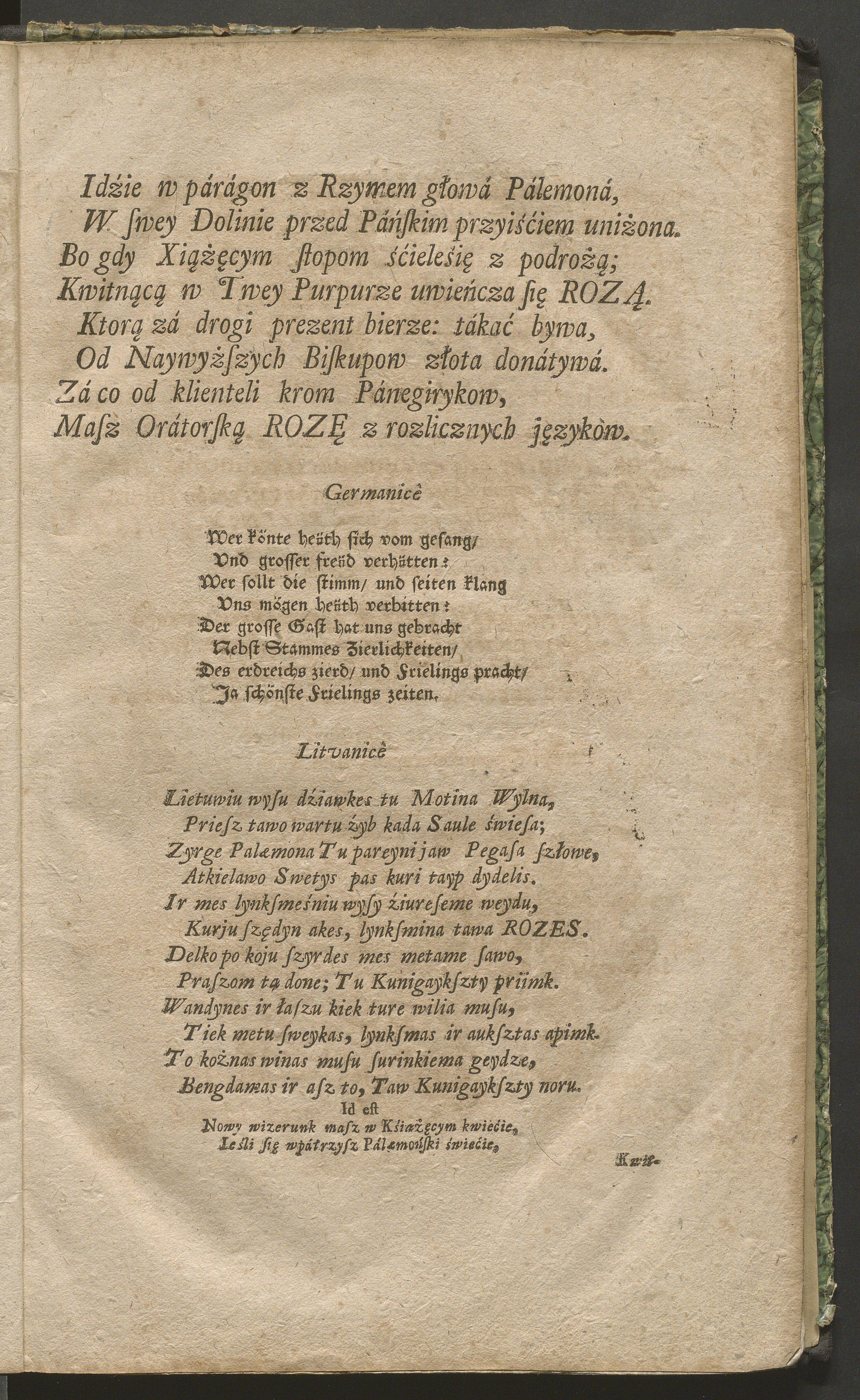
Lithuanian poetry, describing Vilnius as the "Mother of all Lithuanians", published by the Vilnius University in 1729

Samuelis Boguslavas Chilinskis (1631–1666) a Calvinist, translator of the Bible into Lithuanian. The translation was passed to print in London in 1660, but due to unfavourable circumstances it was not finished - only half of the Old Testament was published. Chilinskis also issued two brochures in which he explained his work to the British society and the necessity to publish the Bible in Lithuanian with short information about the Grand Duchy of Lithuania - An Account of the Translation of the Bible into the Lithuanian Tongue (1659) and Ratio institutae translationis Bibliorum in linguam Lithuanicam, in quam nunquam adhuc Scriptura sacra est versa, ex quo fidem Christianam, ab conjunctionem Magni Ducatus Lithvaniae cum Regno Poloniae (1659). As a main source Chilinskis used then popular Dutch Bible edition Statenbijbel.

Kristijonas Donelaitis (1714–1780) wrote the first Lithuanian poem in hexameter Metai (The Seasons, 1818), thus laying the foundations for Lithuanian poetry. His poem is considered the most successful hexameter text in Lithuanian as yet.

Antanas Strazdas (1760–1833) was a poet, who wrote lyrics influenced by folk songs. His best-known work, the hymn Pulkim ant kelių(Let us Fall on Our Knees) is still sung to this day in churches. His most famous poems include Strazdas (The Thrush), where the poet, personified by the bird, sings about peasant's joys and worries; Aušra (The Dawn) tells about the joy dawn brings and that breaks a lot of rules on rhythm and rhyme; Barnis (The Quarrel) is the only poem about Strazdas himself.

Jurgis Pabrėža (1771–1849) was a priest, physician, and botanist; he wrote an encyclopedic work on botany in Samogitian dialect Taislius auguminis (Botany), created Lithuanian terminology of botany. He also wrote about 250 original sermons and a diary Ryžtai (Determinations).

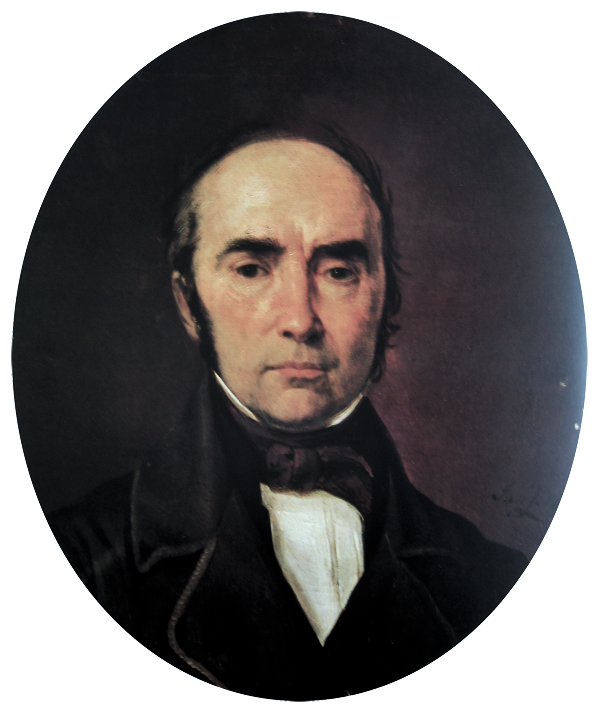
Simonas Daukantas

Simonas Daukantas (1793–1864) promoted a return to Lithuania's pre-Commonwealth traditions, which he depicted as a Golden Age of Lithuania and a renewal of the native culture, based on the Lithuanian language and customs. With those ideas in mind, he wrote already in 1822 a history of Lithuania in Lithuanian - Darbai senųjų lietuvių ir žemaičių (The Deeds of Ancient Lithuanians and Samogitians), though still not yet published at that time.

Mikalojus Akelaitis (1829–1887) one of the most prominent creators of and publishers of Lithuanian didactic literature, publicist, ethnographer. He contributed to Auszra (The Dawn), Gazieta Lietuwiszka (The Lithuanian newspaper), composed narratives Kvestorius (1860), Jonas Išmisločius (1860). In a letter to historian Michal Balinski in 1857 he wrote: "We should lift up the Lithuanian language, wrest away from scorn that language which has the Sanskrit greatness, the Latin force, the Greek refinement, and the Italian melodiousness."

Bishop Motiejus Valančius (1801–1875) sponsored the illegal practice of printing Lithuanian books in Lithuania Minor and smuggling them into Lithuania by knygnešiai. He wrote books himself in a rich Samogitian dialect: Palangos Juzė (Juzė from Palanga); the first illustrated book for children in Lithuanian, Vaikų knygelė (Children's book); Žemaičių vyskupystė (Samogitian bishopric). He also urged to resist Russification and to protest against the closing of Catholic churches and monasteries. Valančius was one of the main figures who laid the ground for the Lithuanian National Revival.

Antanas Baranauskas (1835–1902) wrote the poem Anykščių šilelis (The Forest/Pinewood of Anykščiai, a programmatic work whose main aim was to uncover the beauty of the Lithuanian language and to demonstrate its suitability for poetry. The poem Anykščių šilelis is considered the most famous syllabic verse in Lithuanian. Baranauskas was also a mathematician and dialectologist and created many Lithuanian mathematical terms.

Vaclovas Biržiška (1884–1965) in his monumental 3 volume encyclopedic work Aleksandrynas collected biographies, bibliographies and biobibliographies of Lithuanian writers who wrote in Lithuanian, starting in 1475 and ending in 1865. 370 persons are included in Aleksandrynas.

== 20th-century literature ==
When the ban against printing in the Lithuanian language using the Latin alphabet was lifted in 1904, Lithuanian writers began to experiment with and adopt elements of various European literary movements such as Symbolism, impressionism and expressionism. The first period of Lithuanian independence (1918–40), in the interwar period, gave rise to literature that explored their society and create characters with deep emotions, as their primary concerns were no longer political. The Keturi vėjai movement began with the publication of Prophet of the Four Winds by the poet Kazys Binkis (1893–1942). This was a rebellion against traditional poetry. The theoretical basis of Keturi vėjai initially was futurism which arrived through Russia from the West; later influences were cubism, dadaism, surrealism, unanimism, and German expressionism.

Maironis (1862–1932) is one of the most famous classical Lithuanian poets. He was noted for both dramatic and lyric romantic poetry and has been called “the poet-prophet of the Lithuanian national revival.” He laid the ground for modern Lithuanian poetry. Maironis' poetry was inspired by the nature and ancient history of Lithuania. The names and deeds of the Grand Dukes of Lithuania are often encountered in his verses. The collection of poems Pavasario balsai (Voices of Spring, 1895) is his most notable work.

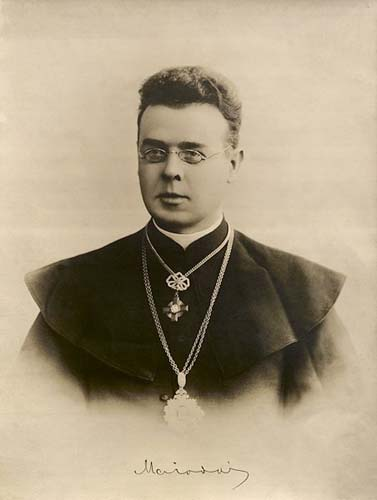
Maironis

An outstanding figure of the early 20th century was Vincas Krėvė-Mickevičius (1882–1954), a novelist and dramatist. His many works include Dainavos šalies senų žmonių padavimai (Old Folks' Tales of Dainava, 1912) and the historical dramas Šarūnas (1911), Skirgaila (1925), and Mindaugo mirtis (The Death of Mindaugas, 1935).

Ignas Šeinius (1889–1959), was a novelist, a Lithuanian diplomat to Sweden and other Scandinavian countries and an impressionist writer. His most notable works are the novel Kuprelis (The Humpback, 1913) and Raudonasis tvanas (The Red Flood, 1940), firstly written in Swedish as Den röda floden. Šeinius describes how the Soviets destroyed the country's independence, trampled the Lithuanian nation's patriotism, forcefully introduced the Soviet way of life; how they Sovietized the country's economy and expropriated private business. The Red Flood serves as an eloquent testimony of those terrible events. His science fiction novel Siegfried Immerselbe atsijaunina (Siegfried Immerselbe rejuvenates himself, 1934) was one of the first novels in Europe denouncing national socialist dystopia.

Petras Vaičiūnas (1890–1959) was another popular playwright, producing one play each year during the 1920s and 1930s.

Jurgis Savickis (1890–1952) was a Lithuanian short story writer and diplomat representing Lithuania mostly in the Scandinavian countries. His works often feature sharp and playful wit and irony, elegant and light writing, succinct and finely tuned sentences. His most notable works are the short story collection Raudoni batukai (The Red Shoes, 1951) and his war-time diary Žemė dega (Earth on Fire, 1956).

Vincas Mykolaitis-Putinas (1893–1967) wrote lyric poetry, plays and novels, including the autobiographical novel Altorių šešėly (In the Shadows of the Altars, 3 vol., 1933), in which he described a priest doubting his vocation and eventually choosing a secular life. In 1935 Mykolaitis renounced his priesthood and became a professor of literature.

The self-educated Žemaitė (1845–1921) published several short stories in the early 20th century; her frank and compassionate stories of Lithuanian village life were commemorated by her image on the 1-litas note.

Vydūnas (1868–1953) was a philosopher, publicist and writer. He was influenced by and joined together in his works classical European and Vedic philosophy. He was interested in Oriental philosophy as a source to revive Lithuanian national consciousness and authentic traditional culture. Main works - Mūsų uždavinys (Our Task, 1911), Tautos gyvata (The Life of the Nation, 1920), Sieben Hundert Jahre deutsch-litauischer Beziehungen (Seven Hundred Years of German-Lithuanian Relations, 1932). In 1940 was nominated for Nobel Prize.

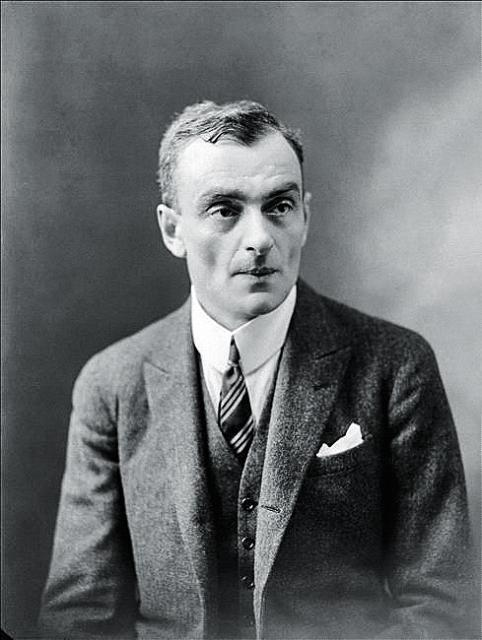
Oskaras Milašius

Oskaras Milašius (Oscar Vladislas de Lubicz Milosz) (1877–1939) was born and spent his childhood in Čerėja (near Mogilev, Belarus). He graduated from Lycée Janson de Sailly in Paris. In 1920, when France recognized the independence of Lithuania, he was appointed Chargé d'Affaires for Lithuania. His publications included a 1928 collection of 26 Lithuanian songs, Lithuanian Tales and Stories (1930), Lithuanian Tales (1933), and The Origin of the Lithuanian Nation (1937). His mysticism and visions were influenced by Emanuel Swedenborg. Milašius identified as a Lithuanian poet writing in French.

Balys Sruoga (1896–1947) wrote dramas based on Lithuanian history or mythology: Milžino paunksmė (Under the Shade of a Giant, 1932), Radvila Perkūnas (Radvila the Thunder, 1935), Baisioji naktis (1935) and Aitvaras teisėjas (1935). During World War II, after the Nazis occupied Lithuania, in March 1943, together with forty-seven other Lithuanian intellectuals, he was sent to Stutthof concentration camp after the Nazis started a campaign against possible anti-Nazi agitation. Based on this experience, Sruoga later wrote his best-known work Dievų miškas (Forest of the Gods, 1957). In this book, Sruoga revealed life in a concentration camp through the eyes of a man whose only way to save his life and maintain his dignity was to view everything through a veil of irony and sarcasm. He exposed both torturers and victims as imperfect human beings, far removed from the false ideals of their political leaders. For example, he wrote "A man is not a machine. He gets tired.", referring to the guards (kapo) beating prisoners.

Ieva Simonaitytė (1897–1978) represented the culture of Lithuania Minor and Klaipėda Region, territories of German East Prussia with a large, but dwindling, Lithuanian population. She received critical acclaim for her novel Aukštujų Šimonių likimas (The Fate of Šimoniai from Aukštujai, 1935).

Antanas Maceina (1908–1987) - philosopher, existentialist, educator, and poet. His main research objects were philosophy of culture, ethics and religion. In a series of books Maceina discusses the existential questions of being and deals with the old theodicy puzzle concerning the genesis and justification of evil: Didysis inkvizitorius (The Grand Inquisitor, 1950), Jobo drama (The Drama of Job, 1950) and Niekšybės paslaptis (The Secret of Meanness, 1964).

Vytautė Žilinskaitė (b. 1930) received, among other awards, two prizes for her children's books, a 1964 Journalists’ Union prize and a 1972 state prize for works classified as humorous or satiric. In 1961 she published Don’t Stop, Little Hour, a collection of poetry.

Marcelijus Martinaitis (1936–2013) was a poet and essayist. The main theme of his poetry is the clash of the old, archaic, rural worldview with the modern world. His main work is Kukučio baladės (The Ballads of Kukutis, 1977), a poem about a prankster, the trickster Kukutis, who exposes the absurdity of "modern new life" brought by the brutal Soviet occupation from the East, was one of the catalysts for the peaceful revolution in Lithuania. The poem was sung or recited during the mass political rallies of the late 1980s and early '90s.

Sigitas Geda (1943–2008) was a productive poet and playwright. His poems connect ancient Lithuanian polytheistic religion and mythology with Greek and Sumerian myths, intertwining the old and new worlds with the ode to life and vitality. His most important works are Strazdas (1967), 26 rudens ir vasaros giesmės (26 autumn and summer songs, 1972), Žalio gintaro vėriniai (Green Amber Necklaces, 1988) and the libretto Strazdas - žalias paukštis (Strazdas - green bird, 1984).

Tomas Venclova (b. 1937), born in Klaipėda, is a poet, essayist, literary critic, and translator. While he was a professor at Vilnius University, he became involved in the Lithuanian Helsinki Group, a human rights organization that included protests against Soviet activities in Lithuania. His involvement led to conflicts with the government, but in 1977 he gained permission to emigrate to the US; there he became a professor at Yale University. The Sign of Speech, a volume of poetry, published in Lithuania before his departure, was followed by other volumes of poetry, essays, and translations published in the US. Several compilations of these works were published in Lithuania after it achieved independence in the 1990s. His literary criticism includes a study of Aleksander Wat.

Arvydas Šliogeris (1944–2019) was a philosopher, essayist, translator of philosophical texts and social critic. In his works, Šliogeris researches the problems of Being and Essence, the fundamentals of Thinginess and Existence. He is also the most known Lithuanian researcher of Martin Heidegger. Essential works - Niekis ir esmas (2005), Transcendencijos tyla (1996), Daiktas ir menas (1988).

Petras Dirgėla (1947–2015) was a prosaist, essayist, and creator of the historiosophic novel tradition in Lithuanian literature. His most known works are Joldijos jūra (Yoldia Sea, 1987–1988) and Anciliaus ežeras (Ancylus Lake, 1991). The climax of Dirgėla's creativity is the monumental four-volume (consisting of 14 books) saga Karalystė. Žemės keleivių epas (The Kingdom. An Epic of Earth Travellers, 1997–2004). His books have been translated into 10 languages.

Ričardas Gavelis (1950–2002) was a writer, playwright, journalist and the author of Vilniaus pokeris (translated as Vilnius Poker) and several other novels and collections of short stories. His work is characterized by a mix of fantasy, eroticism, philosophical ponderings on the human condition, and psychological insight.

Saulius Tomas Kondrotas (b. 1953) is a philosophical writer and a master of short stories. His style and the abstraction of the world in his work resemble that of Jorge Luis Borges. Kondrotas defected to West Germany in 1986. In his most famous novel Žalčio žvilgsnis (The Serpent's Gaze, 1981) he explores the problem of evil and destruction which unnoticeably penetrates the family and generations. The novel has been translated into 15 languages.

Jurgis Kunčinas (1947–2002), Ričardas Gavelis (1950–2002), and Jurga Ivanauskaitė (1961–2007) wrote novels exploring the Lithuanian condition during the late 20th century.

== 21st-century literature ==
Alvydas Šlepikas (b. 1966) is a writer, a poet and a playwright. His novel Mano vardas – Marytė (In the Shadow of Wolves, 2012) became the most read novel of 2012 in Lithuania and has gone through six reprints. The English translation of the book was the Book of the Month by the Times newspaper in the UK in July 2019. It is one of the most translated Lithuanian novels - it was translated into English, German, Polish, Latvian, Estonian, Ukrainian, and the Dutch.

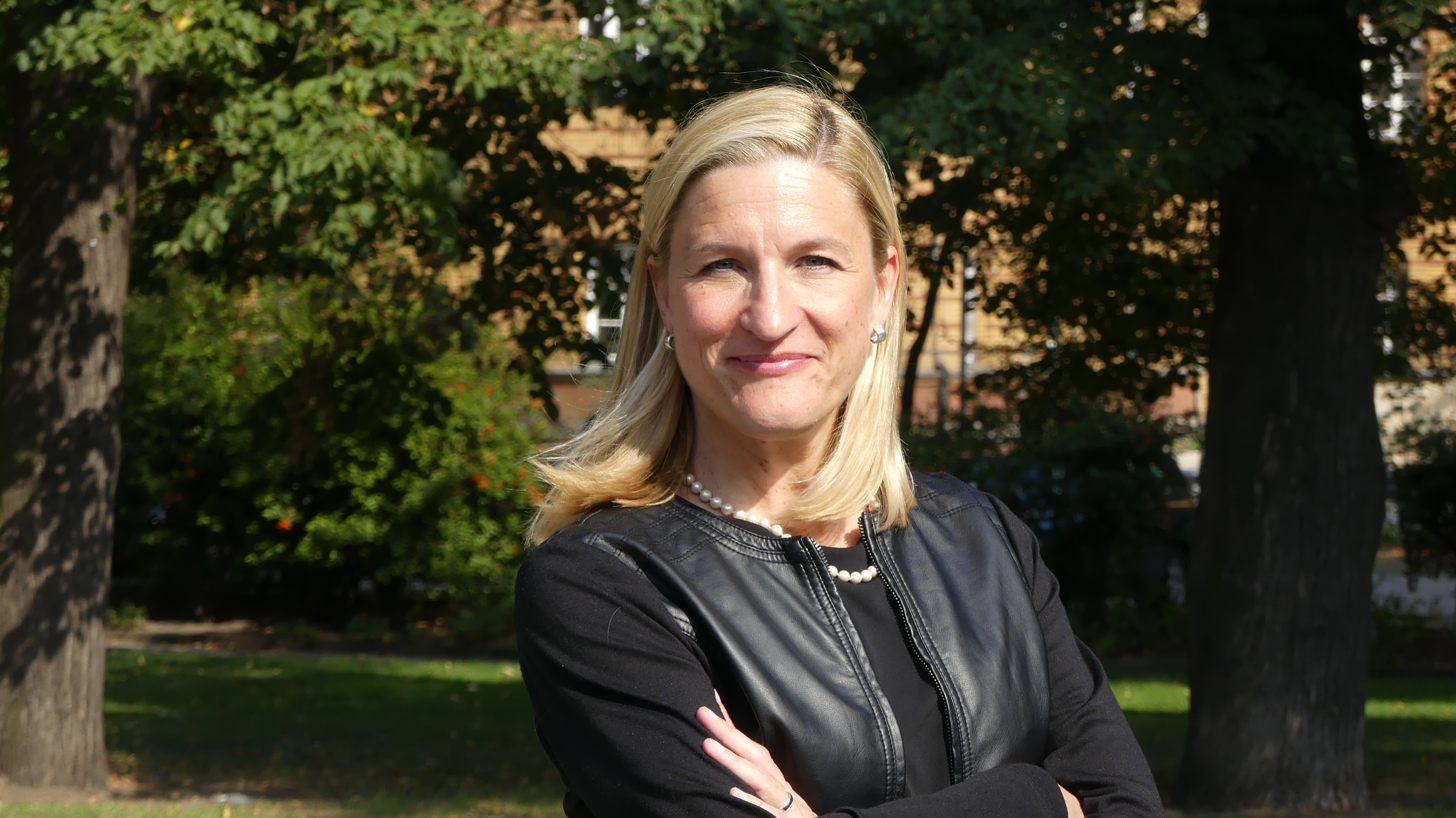
Rūta Šepetys

Rūta Šepetys (b. 1967) is a Lithuanian-American writer of historical fiction. As an author, she is a #1 New York Times bestseller, an international bestseller and winner of the Carnegie Medal. Her first novel, Between Shades of Gray (2011), about the Genocide of Lithuanian people after the Soviet occupation in 1941, was critically acclaimed and translated into over 30 different languages.

Kristina Sabaliauskaitė (b. 1974) is a Lithuanian author and art historian. She is best known as the author of the series of historical novels Silva Rerum and Peter's Empress. Kristina Sabaliauskaitė debuted with her 4-volume saga of Lithuanian nobility life in the Grand Duchy of Lithuania Silva Rerum (2008, 2011, 2014, 2016). It became a bestseller in Lithuania and was translated into Polish and Latvian. Latvian readers voted for its inclusion in a list of 100 of Latvia's Favourite Books of All Times. In Poland, it received exceptional reviews.

Laura Sintija Černiauskaitė (b. 1976) is a writer and a playwright. Her most notable works are the play Liučė čiuožia (Liučė Skates, 2003) and her debut novel Kvėpavimas į marmurą (Breathing into Marble, 2006), which won the EU Prize for Literature in 2009 and has been translated into English.

Rimantas Kmita (b. 1977) is a writer, essayist and translator. His most notable work is Pietinia kronikas (The Chronicles of the Southern District, 2016), a chronicle of the Šiauliai Southern District, written in Šiauliai dialect and slang. It was selected book of the year in 2017 in the adult category.

Agnė Žagrakalytė (b. 1979) is a poet, essayist and literary critic. Her first collection of poems, Išteku (I am getting married), was published in 2003. Her second book Visa tiesa apie Alisą Meler (All the truth about Alisa Meler) was published in 2008 and named one of the ten most creative books in Lithuania in 2008.

Gabija Grušaitė (b. 1987) is a Lithuanian writer, curator, and cultural entrepreneur. Born in Vilnius, Lithuania, she lives between London, Monte Argentario, and Pervalka. She studied media and anthropology in London and spent seven years in Malaysia, where she founded the independent art space Hin Bus Depot. Grušaitė has published three novels: Neišsipildymas (2010, 2020), Stasys Šaltoka: vieneri metai (2017, 2024), and Grybo sapnas (2023). Her second novel, Stasys Šaltoka: vieneri metai, was translated into English as Cold East (2018, 2019) and Ukrainian (Крижаний схід… Один рік із життя Стасіса Шалтока, 2022), earning the Jurga Ivanauskaite literary award, the Penang Monthly literary prize, and a nomination for Lithuanian Book of the Year. The book also made it into the top 12 most creative books selected by the Lithuanian Institute of Literature and Folklore. Additionally, she authored her first children’s book, Grožis ir Heizelis.

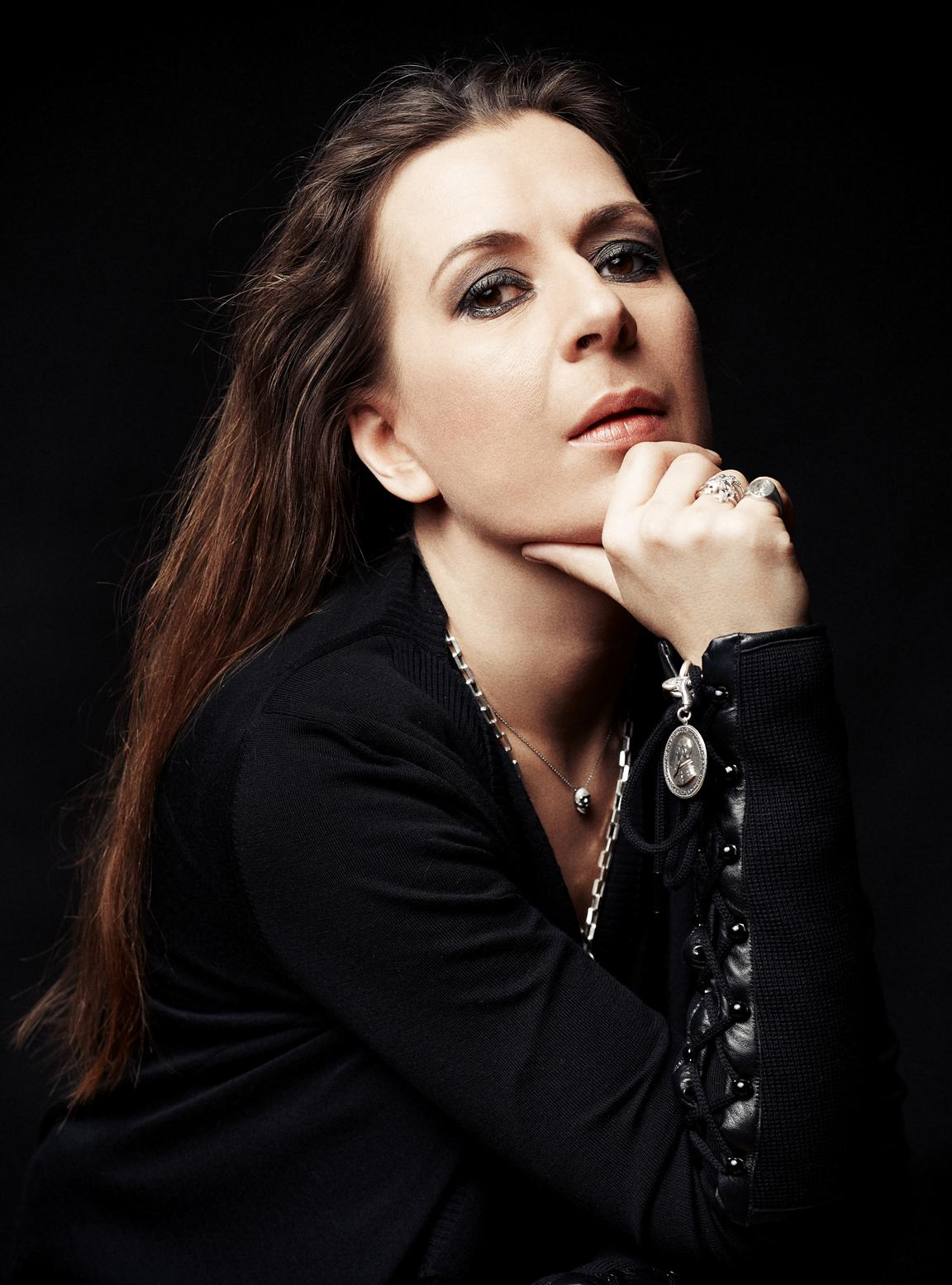
Kristina Sabaliauskaitė

== National songs and folklore ==
The Institute of Lithuanian Literature and Folklore (Lietuvių literatūros ir tautosakos institutas) is publishing collections of Lithuanian national songs - Dainynas. Zenonas Slaviūnas has published 3 volumes of Lithuanian Sutartinės (polyphonic songs) texts. Traditional vocal music is held in high esteem on a world scale: Lithuanian song fests and sutartinės multipart songs are on the UNESCO's representative list of the Masterpieces of the Oral and Intangible Heritage of Humanity. It is counted up to 400 000 Lithuanian song texts collected by researchers and folklorists and stored in the Lithuanian Folklore Archive.

== Memoirs of deportees and partisans ==
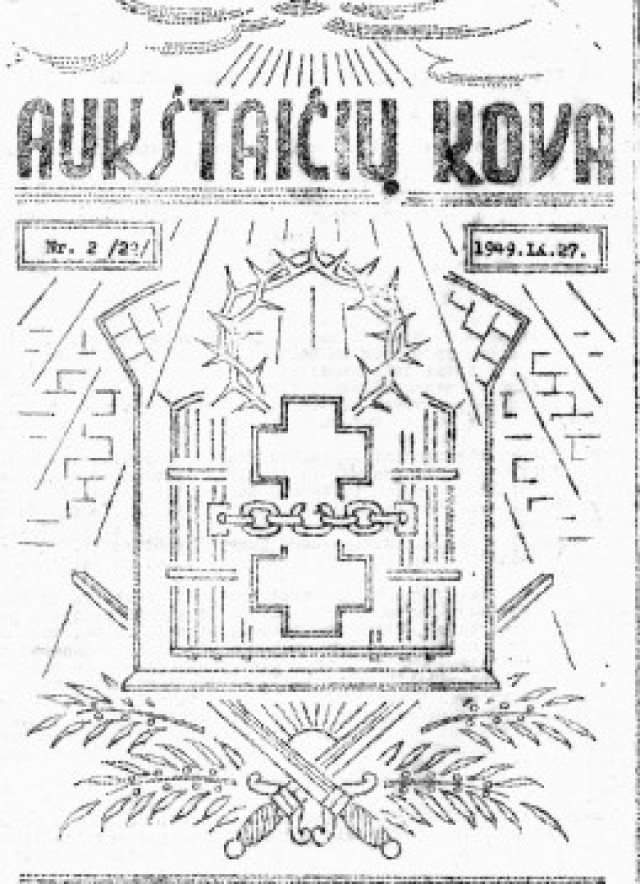
Aukštaičių kova (The Fight of Aukštaitians) - a zine published by the Lithuanian partisans, 1949

After regaining the Independence in 1990, many previously forbidden and unpublished works of literature reached the reader. Multiple volumes of memoirs by Lithuanian deportees and Lithuanian partisans were collected and published. It is being referred to as tremties literatūra (literature of the deportations), tremtinių atsiminimai (memoirs of the deportees), partizanų literatūra (literature of the Lithuanian partisans). The most known Lithuanian partisan writers are Adolfas Ramanauskas (pseudonym Vanagas, 1918–1957), Juozas Lukša (pseudonym Daumantas, 1921–1951), Lionginas Baliukevičius (pseudonym Dzūkas, 1925–1950), poet Bronius Krivickas (1919–1952), poet and literary critic Mamertas Indriliūnas (1920–1945).

The book Partizanai (The Partisans) by Juozas Lukša-Daumantas has been issued multiple times in Lithuania and published in the US as Fighters for Freedom. Lithuanian Partisans Versus the U.S.S.R. in 1975, as Forest Brothers: The Account of an Anti-soviet Lithuanian Freedom Fighter, 1944-1948 in 2010, and Sweden as Skogsbröder in 2005.

The most famous representatives of the Lithuanian deportee literature are Dalia Grinkevičiūtė (1927–1987), Valentas Ardžiūnas (1933–2007), Leonardas Matuzevičius (1923 – 2000), Petras Zablockas (1914–2008), Kazys Inčiūra (1906–1974), Antanas Miškinis (1905–1983).

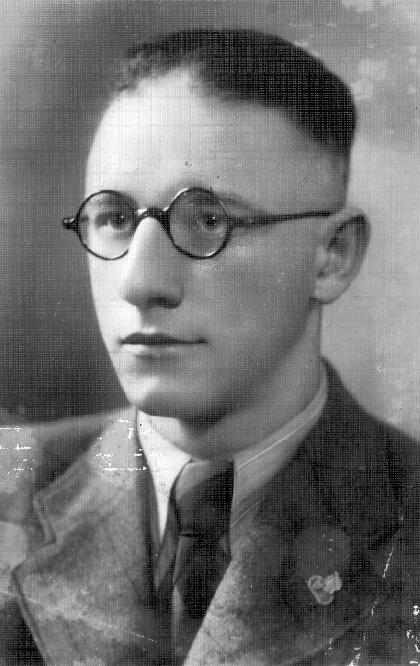
Writer, partisan Bronius Krivickas

Antanas Miškinis wrote his Psalmės (Psalms, 1989) in GULAG on the scraps of birch barks and cement sack. Many of his Psalms became national songs.

Dalia Grinkevičiūtė experienced the horror of GULAGS as she was deported with he family in 1941, after the occupation of Lithuania by the Russians. After she returned to Lithuania after 15 years she wrote memoirs herself and collected memoirs of other deportees. For this activity, she was persecuted by the KGB. Most known books of Dalia Grinkevičiūtė are Lietuviai prie Laptevų jūros (Lithuanians by the Laptev Sea), 1988 (" Reconciliation", 2002), A Stolen Youth, a Stolen Homeland: Memoirs, 2002, Shadows on the Tundra, 2018.

Ona Lukauskaitė-Poškienė (1906 – 1983) was a Lithuanian resistant, sentenced to 10 years for her activity in anti-Soviet resistance. She wrote memoirs about her years in Soviet lagers and a novel Lagerių pasakos (Fairy Tales of GULAGs).

The Lithuanian partisan movement, which lasted for more than 8 years, also contributed to folklore as well. There are known thousands of partisan songs (partizanų dainos) which were popular among partisans and the Lithuanian people.

== Lithuanian literature in exile ==
There is a body of work by Lithuanians who were compelled to leave the country or who emigrated as children with their parents. Lithuanian exile literature is an equivalent part of literature created by those who stayed. With the return of the Soviets in 1944, about two-thirds of the Lithuanian writers, along with 62,000 other Lithuanians, went abroad - thus, Lithuanian literature was split in two. These authors include Antanas Škėma (1910–1961), Alfonsas Nyka-Nyliūnas (1919–2015), Marius Katiliškis (1914–1980), Kazys Bradūnas (1917–2009), Bernardas Brazdžionis (1907–2002), Henrikas Radauskas (1910–1970) and many others.

Numerous Lithuanian poets were forced into exile or emigrated to flee the Soviet occupation after World War II. They wrote expressing nostalgia for the native land and Lithuanian nature, and homesteads. This movement was named Žemininkai, meaning the land poets, after the anthology Žemė (The Land), which was compiled by Kazys Bradūnas and was published in Los Angeles in 1951. Five poets usually classified as Žemininkai are Juozas Kėkštas (1915–1981), Kazys Bradūnas, Alfonsas Nyka-Niliūnas, Henrikas Nagys (1920–1996) and Vytautas Mačernis (1921–1944) (posthumously).

The Lithuanian exile literature has been divided into three periods: 1) the period of the refugee camps in Germany and Austria (1945–50), which was characterized by feelings of alienation, nostalgia, and uncertainty about the future; 2) the period of settlement (1950–60) in which difficulties of adaptation to the unfamiliar and conflict between old and new values were uppermost; and 3) the period of integration into a new, modern society, in which experimentation in literature once more became important.

The most famous novel by Antanas Škėma, Baltoji drobulė (White Shroud, 1958) only recently was translated into English and German and got international acclaim.

Jonas Mekas (1922–2019) is a filmmaker, poet and artist and has often been called "the godfather of American avant-garde cinema". He is known for collections of poems Semeniškių idilės (1948), Gėlių kalbėjimas (1961), Dienoraščiai 1970–1982 (1985), essays Laiškai iš niekur (Letters from Nowhere, 1997). The poems and prose of Mekas have been translated into French, German, and English.

Vytautas Kavolis (1930–1996) was a sociologist, literary critic, and cultural historian. His studies on Lithuanian nationalism and literature were influential among Lithuanian intellectuals abroad and after regaining the Independence in 1990 - in Lithuania as well.

Algis Budrys (1931–2008) was born into the family of a Lithuanian diplomat which didn't return to Lithuania after its occupation by the Soviet Union. Algis Budrys wrote in English and is known for such science fiction novels as Who?, Rogue Moon. In addition to numerous Hugo Award and Nebula Award nominations, Budrys won the Science Fiction Research Association's 2007 Pilgrim Award for lifetime contributions to speculative fiction scholarship.

Eduardas Cinzas (1924–1996) left Lithuania in 1944 and settled in Belgium. In his novels, the life of small Belgian cities is depicted realistically and sarcastically. Most notable works - Brolio Mykolo gatvė (The Street of Brother Mykolas, 1972), Šv. Petro šunynas (The Doggery of Saint Peter, 1984)

Antanas Šileika (b. 1953) was born in Canada to Lithuanian parents. Through journalism, he became involved with Lithuania's restitution of independence during the fall of the Soviet Union in 1988–1991, and for this activity, he received the Knight's Cross medal from the Lithuanian government in 2004. His most notable works are Woman in Bronze (2004), The Barefoot Bingo Caller (2017), Provisionally Yours (2019).

== Publishing and literary events ==
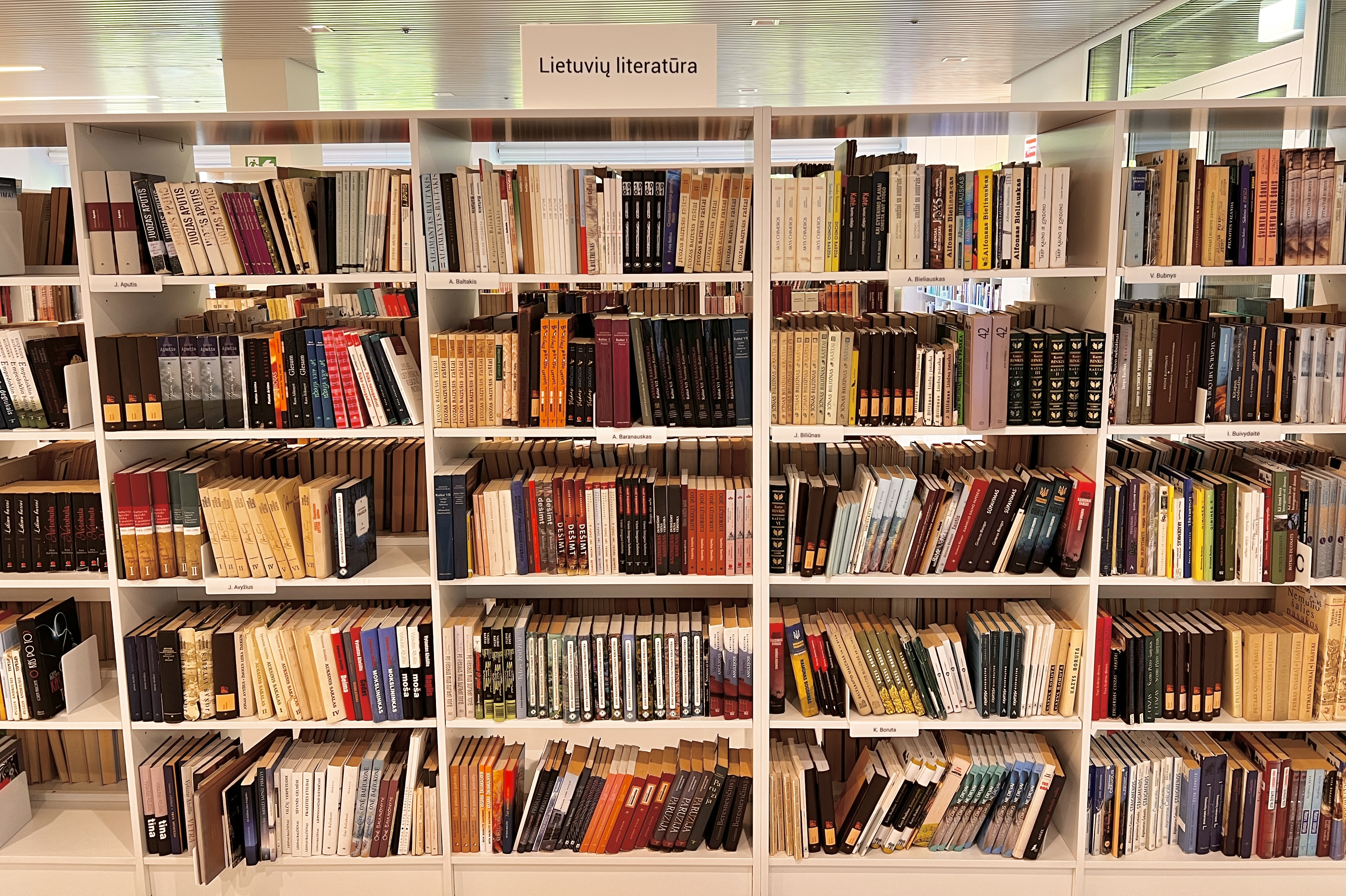
Lithuanian literature in the Kaunas library.

In Lithuania, 45 publishing houses cover 83% of the entire book publishing market. Vilnius Book Fair is the biggest Book Fair in the Baltic States. Also, it is one of the most significant cultural events in Lithuania. The International Vilnius Book Fair is exclusively focused on the reader; its main accent is on books and cultural events, as well as on the possibility for authors to interact with their readers. Translation of Lithuanian authors into other languages is supported by the Translation Grant Programme being run by the Lithuanian Culture Institute. Only in 2020 translations of 46 books by Lithuanian authors were confirmed.

Poezijos pavasaris (Poetry Spring) is an international poetry festival, taking place annually, since 1965. It features Lithuanian poets as well as other international poets focusing on a variety of literary forms including poetry, translations and essays. Every year the laureate of the festival is awarded an oak wreath. Since 1985 the international poetry festival Druskininkai Poetic Fall takes place in early October.

Tomas Venclova and Dalia Grinkevičiūtė are the most published and translated Lithuanian authors abroad.

== Literary criticism ==
First fragments of literary criticism are found in writings and bookmarks of Danielius Kleinas (1609–1666), Michael Mörlin (1641–1708), Pilypas Ruigys (1675–1749) and others. Simonas Vaišnoras (Varniškis) (1545–1600) was the first who wrote more comprehensively about Lithuanian literature in the preface of his Žemčiūga teologiška (The Pearl of Theology, 1600)

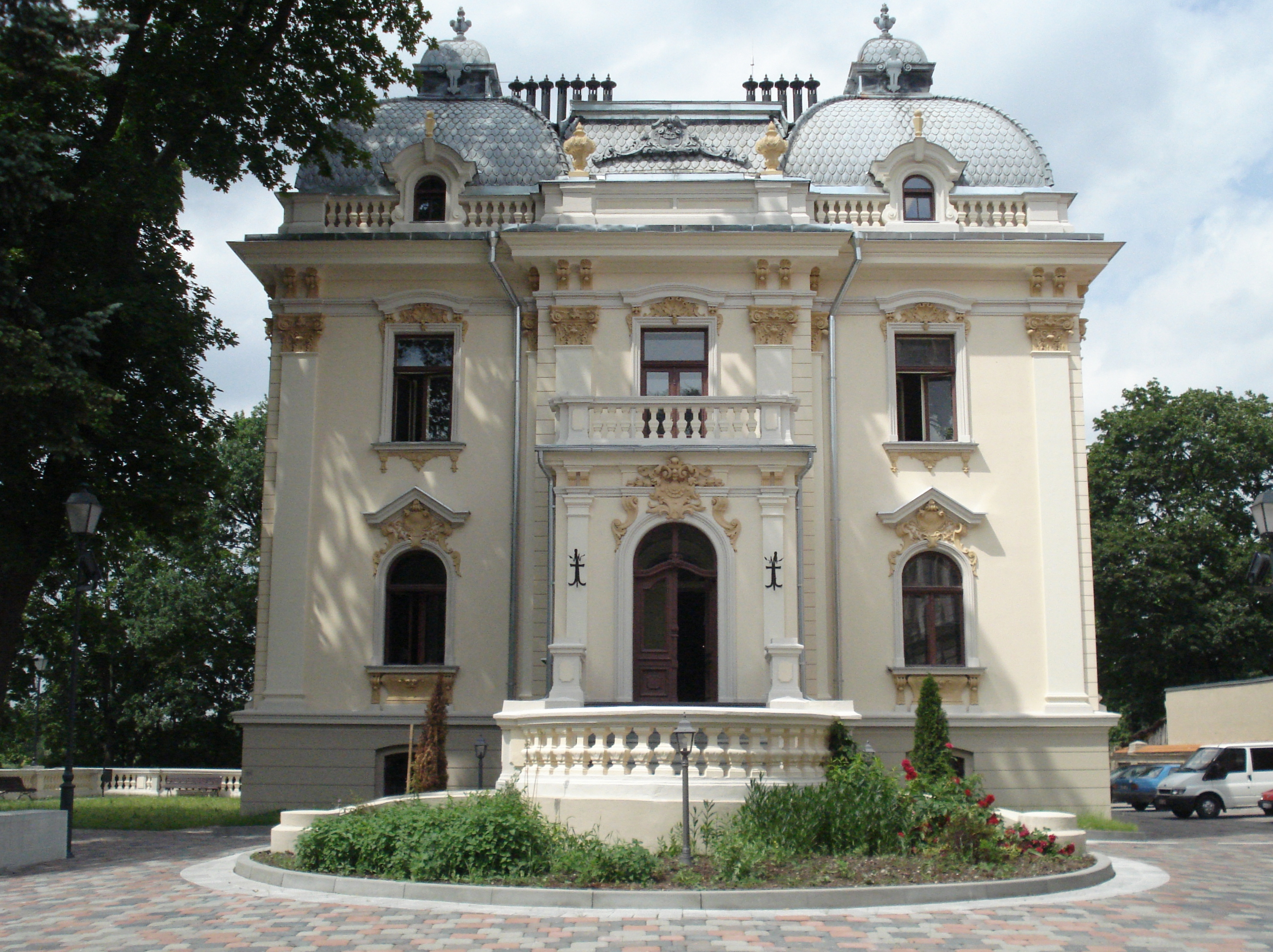
The Institute of Lithuanian Literature and Folklore in Vileišis Palace

== See also ==
- List of libraries in Lithuania

== Literature ==
- (In Lithuanian, Latin) Compilers: Narbutienė, Daiva; Narbutas, Sigitas; Editors: Ulčinaitė, Eugenija; Pociūtė, Dainora; Lukšaitė, Ingė; Kuolys, Darius; Jovaišas, Albinas; Girdzijauskas, Juozapas; Dini, Pietro U. (2002). XV-XVI a. Lietuvos lotyniškų knygų sąrašas / Index librorum latinorum Lituaniae saeculi quinti decimi et sexti decimi. Vilnius : Lietuvių literaturos ir tautosakos institutas. ISBN 978-9986513520
- A Nyka-Niliunas. Lithuanian Literature. Anthony Thorlby (ed). The Penguin Companion to Literature. Penguin Books. 1969. Volume 2 (European Literature). Pages 481 and 482.
- "Lithuanian literature" in Chris Murray (ed). The Hutchinson Dictionary of the Arts. Helicon Publishing Limited. 1994. Reprinted 1997. ISBN 1859860478. Page 311.
- Kvietkauskas, M. (2011). Transitions of Lithuanian Postmodernism: Lithuanian Literature in the Post-Soviet Period (On the Boundary of Two Worlds: Identity, Freedom, and Moral Imagination in the Baltics). Rodopi. ISBN 978-9042034419
- Kelertas V. (1992). Come into My Time: Lithuania in Prose Fiction, 1970-90. University of Illinois Press. ISBN 978-0252062377
- (In Lithuanian) Editors: Bradūnas K., Šilbajoris R. (1997). Lietuvių egzodo literatūra 1945-1990 / Literature of the Lithuanian exodus 1945-1990. Vilnius: Lituanistikos institutas (Chicago). ISBN 5-415-004459
- Samalavičius A. (2014) The Dedalus Book of Lithuanian Literature (Dedalus Anthologies), Dedalus Limited. ISBN 978-1909232426
- Young, Francis (2024). Poetry and Nation-Building in the Grand Duchy of Lithuania, Arc Humanities Press. ISBN 9781802702293
