= Jonas Radvanas =

Lithuanian poet (died after 1592)

Jonas Radvanas (Latin: Ioannes Radvanus; Polish: Jan Radwan, died after 1592) was a Renaissance poet and protestant reformer from the Grand Duchy of Lithuania. Very little is known about his life and he is best remembered as the author of an epic poem Radivilias dedicated to the military achievements of Mikołaj "the Red" Radziwiłł. However, the poem goes beyond a simple panegyric and paints a broader patriotic image of the Grand Duchy. In total, he wrote 18 poems that were published in various publications by the Calvinists in the Grand Duchy. All of his works were written in Latin.

== Biography ==
There is very little known about Radvanas and researchers make educated guesses based on his works. Some biographical data was provided by Franciszek Siarczyński (1758–1829) but it is unclear where Siarczyński obtained that information as it cannot be verified by researchers. Siarczyński wrote that Radvanas was born and educated in Vilnius, traveled in Western Europe with the support of Lithuanian Grand Hetman Hrehory Chodkiewicz, and later worked as Chodkiewicz's secretary.

Radvanas was active between 1584 and 1592 which would imply that he was born in the middle of the century. He signed his first published poem as Joannes Raduanouiuis Vilnensis (i.e. Jonas Radvanas of Vilnius) which could indicate that he was born in the city or the surrounding area, but could also mean that he was just a long-term resident of the city. He was well educated as demonstrated by his excellent knowledge of Roman authors – in his works he referenced Catullus, Virgil, Ovid, Propertius, Tibullus, Cicero, Statius, Silius Italicus, Claudian, Prudentius, and others. He further cited Homer and Hesiod which would indicate he knew Ancient Greek language. Radvanas' works also demonstrate familiarity with the regimes in France and England which might indicate that he visited or studied in these countries.

Lack of any information about his family or any nobles with the same surname indicates that he was not a member of the Lithuanian nobility. This is further supported by Radvanas texts that promote values like piousness, loyalty, bravery that were more important to commoners (as opposed to nobility, family tradition, or honor). He was likely a Lithuanian speaker as he included a few Lithuanian words in the margins of Radvilias. Radavanas was closely associated with the supporters and activists of the Protestant Reformation in Lithuania. His works were published by the Calvinists and a Jesuits satire from 1590 mentioned him as one of their opponents. They attacked his polemic satirical work Theses Theologicae after a Calvinist synod in Vilnius.

Radvanas disappears from written records in 1592. It is probable that he died in a plague epidemic that swept Vilnius that year.

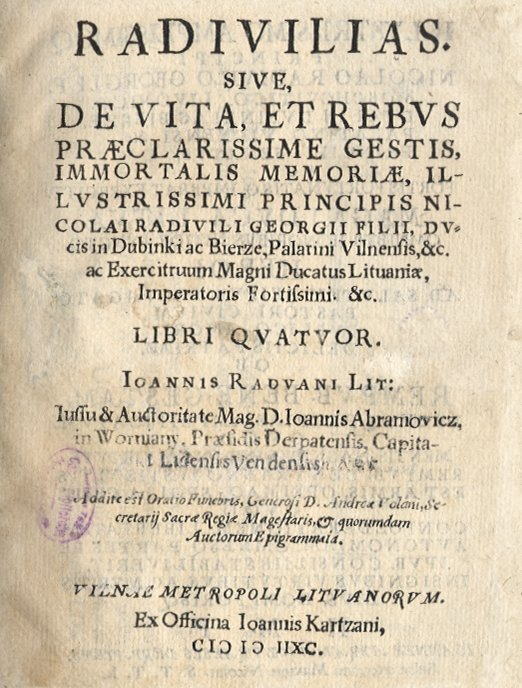
Title page of Radivilias (1592)

== Works ==
The Latin poem Radivilias is one of the major works of the 16th-century Lithuanian literature and one of the best examples of Renaissance literature in Lithuania. It is dedicated to Mikołaj "the Red" Radziwiłł (1512–1584) and his major military victories in the Livonian War . However, the poem goes beyond a simple panegyric and paints a broader patriotic image of the Grand Duchy of Lithuania, its history, geography, and culture. The work was commissioned by Jan Abramowicz, one of Radziwiłł's political allies and later Voivode of Smolensk. The poem was first published in 1592 in Vilnius together with several other Latin works by Andreas Volanus, Pedro Ruiz de Moros, and others.

In total, Radvanas wrote 18 poems and one prose work that were published in six books by the Calvinists in the Grand Duchy. His first poem (an epigram) was published in 1584 to commemorate the death of Mikołaj "the Red" Radziwiłł. In 1590, Radvanas published 565-line epithalamium for the wedding of Krzysztof Dorohostajski and Zofia, daughter of Jan Hieronimowicz Chodkiewicz. The poem depicts a gathering of Roman gods on Mount Olympus who survey calamities in Europe (e.g. French Wars of Religion, Anglo-Spanish War (1585–1604)). They find one worthy man (i.e. Dorohostajski) and decide to award him with state offices, wisdom, and a beautiful wife. A quatrain by Radvanas was published in a work by Andrzej Rymsza glorifying Krzysztof Mikołaj "Piorun" Radziwiłł. Three of his poems were included in Obrona postylle ewanielickiej (Defense of Evangelical Postil) by Grzegorz z Żarnowca published in 1591.

== Bibliography ==
- Lukšaitė, Ingė (1999). Reformacija Lietuvos Didžiojoje Kunigaikštystėje ir Mažojoje Lietuvoje (in Lithuanian). Baltos lankos. ISBN 9986-861-76-4.
- Lulewicz, Henryk (1987). "Jan Radwan". Polish Biographical Dictionary (in Polish). Vol. XXX.
- Narbutas, Sigitas (2006). "Jono Radvano "Radviliada" anuo metu ir dabar" (PDF). Lietuvos mokslų akademijos biblioteka (in Lithuanian). 2003/2004. ISSN 1648-9772.
- Narbutas, Sigitas (2011). "Jonas Radvanas". In Narbutas, Sigitas (ed.). Senosios Lietuvos literatūra 1253–1795 (in Lithuanian). Vilnius: Lietuvių literatūros ir tautosakos institutas. ISBN 978-609-425-049-1.
- Mičiulienė, Jūratė (21 November 2011). "Karingos tautos turi savo epus. Kuo mes prastesni?" (in Lithuanian). Lietuvos žinios.
- Patiejūnienė, Eglė (2012–2014). "Jono Radvano "Radviliada" – lietuviškojo imperializmo tekstas". Orbis Lituaniae – Lietuvos Didžiosios Kunigaikštystės istorijos (in Lithuanian). Vilnius University. Archived from the original on 24 November 2015.
- Pociūtė-Abukevičienė, Dainora. "Radvanas". Šaltiniai.info (in Lithuanian). Lietuvių literatūros ir tautosakos institutas, Vilniaus universiteto Filologijos ir Istorijos fakultetai.
- Radvanas, Jonas (2007). "Epitalamijas šviesaus ir prakilnaus pono Kristupo Manvydo-Dorohostaiskio... ir kilmingiausios bei šviesiausios panelės Sofijos Chodkevičiūtės... vestuvėms, poetiškai pavaizduotas Jono Radvano" (PDF). Senoji Lietuvos literatūra. 23. Translated by Narbutas, Sigitas. ISSN 1822-3656.
- Vaškelienė, Asta (22 July 2019) [2011]. "Jonas Radavanas". Visuotinė lietuvių enciklopedija (in Lithuanian). Mokslo ir enciklopedijų leidybos centras.
