= Radivilias =

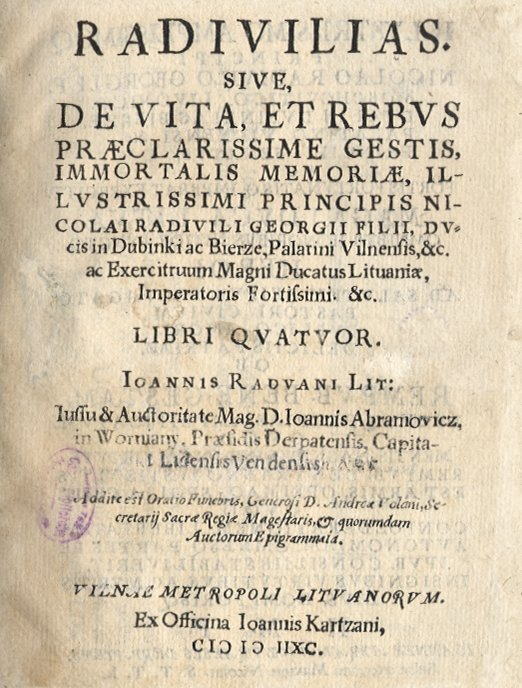
Title page of Radivilias (1588)

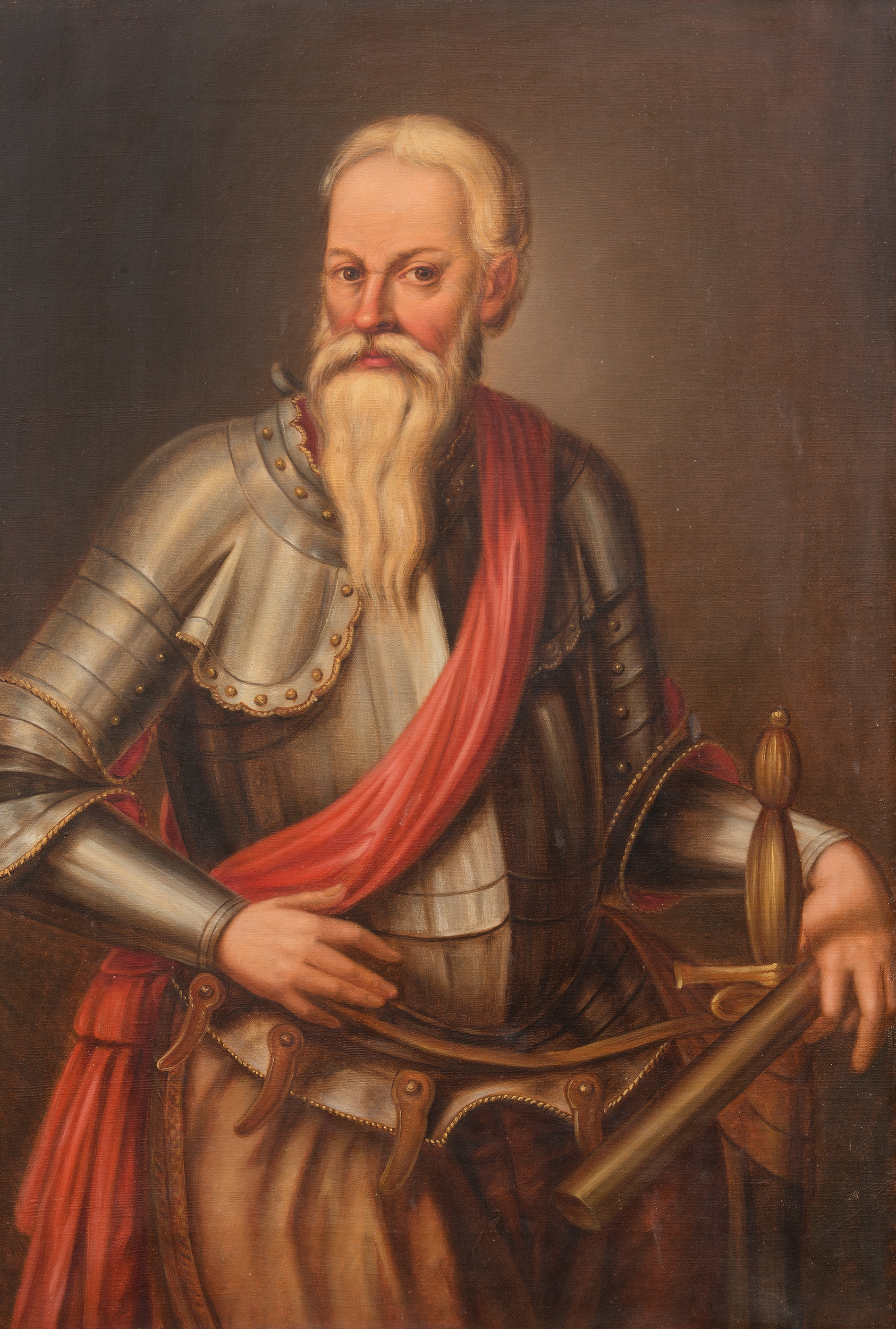
Mikołaj "the Red" Radziwiłł, celebrated by the poem

Radivilias (Lithuanian: Radviliada, Polish: Radziwiliada) is a Latin epic poem by Jonas Radvanas published in 1592. It is one of the major works of the 16th-century Lithuanian literature and one of the best examples of Renaissance literature in Lithuania. It uses hexameter and has 3,302 lines divided into four parts. It is dedicated to Mikołaj "the Red" Radziwiłł (1512–1584) and his major military victories in the Livonian War.

== Content ==
=== Radziwiłł's military victories ===
The poem is dedicated to Mikołaj "the Red" Radziwiłł (1512–1584) and his major military victories in the Livonian War – capture of the Tarvastu Castle in 1561, Battle of Wenden in 1578, Siege of Polotsk in 1579, Siege of Velikiye Luki in 1580, and his largest victory in the Battle of Ula in 1564.

Similarly to the legendary Aeneas, Radziwiłł fulfills his destiny by protecting and defending Lithuania from the Tsardom of Russia and receives a prophetic instruction from Musaeus of Athens. At Ula, Radziwiłł is guided by a vision of Grand Duke Vytautas (ruled 1392–1430) and draws inspiration from his victory in the Battle of Grunwald in 1410. At the same time, the poem vilifies Lithuania's greatest enemy Ivan the Terrible. Radvanas borrowed imagery about Ivan from his biography by Paul Oderborn. While the goal of the poem was to promote and glorify Radziwiłł and the Grand Duchy, it also provides some valuable historical details. For example, Radziwiłł's year of birth (1512) is known only from the poem.

Radvanas followed and borrowed from Roman literature, and in particular from Virgil's Aeneid. For example, he borrowed the idea to describe the entire history of Lithuania in the Radziwiłł's shield from Aeneid.

=== Political themes ===
The poem goes beyond a simple panegyric and paints a broader patriotic image of the Grand Duchy of Lithuania, its history, geography, and culture. Lithuania is presented as a powerful and wealthy country. Radvanas traced the lineage of Lithuanian rulers to the legendary Palemonid dynasty which hailed from the Roman Empire and included other patriotic legends (such as the legend about the Grand Duke Gediminas' dream of the Iron Wolf) from the Lithuanian Chronicles and the history of Lithuania by Maciej Stryjkowski.

It also subtly supported Lithuania's geopolitical aspirations. For example, Dnieper river which flows through the territory that was transferred to Poland by the Union of Lublin in 1569 was mentioned as a river of Lithuania. Similarly, Daugava in Livonia (territory at the center of the Livonian War) was also mentioned as Lithuania's. In the poem, in his deathbed Radziwiłł prays to God asking for glory and scepter for Lithuania – a hint at the desire to break the Union of Lublin and for the Grand Duchy to become independent Kingdom of Lithuania.

== Publication and reception ==
The work was commissioned by Jan Abramowicz, one of Radziwiłł's political allies and later Voivode of Smolensk. The poem was first published in 1592 in Vilnius together with several other Latin works by Andreas Volanus, Pedro Ruiz de Moros, and others. There are eight known surviving copies of Radivilias. The only copy in Lithuania is kept by the Library of the Lithuanian Academy of Sciences and was originally owned by Kazimierz Leon Sapieha (1609–1656).

In 1580s and 1590s, there were several works published that glorified military achievements of the Radziwiłł family. A letter written by Wacław Agryppa in 1578 indicates that this was an intentional campaign to promote not only the Radziwiłł family but also their patriotic vision of the Grand Duchy of Lithuania independent of Poland.

The first critical evaluation of Radviliana was published in 1747 by the librarian of Józef Andrzej Załuski. At the time, it was described as a mere panegyric with no new or clear ideas. Such critical evaluations were repeated by various authors until mid-20th century when historian reevaluated the poem's historical context and artistic merit.

== Translations and adaptations ==
The poem was translated into Lithuanian language as Radviliada by the literary historian Sigitas Narbutas in 1997. Since then, the poem has been added to the high school curriculum in Lithuania. In 2015, film Radivilias which was described as "cinematic journey" as it mixed different genres (drama, documentary, behind the scenes) highlighted some of the key episodes from the lives of Mikołaj "the Red" Radziwiłł, Mikołaj "the Black" Radziwiłł, and Mikołaj Krzysztof "the Orphan" Radziwiłł and traced some of their descendants in the present day.

The poem was translated into Belarusian by Žanna Niekraševič-Karotkaja (published in 2011–12). Italian translation by the scholar Simone Carboni was published in 2022.

== Bibliography ==
- Augulytė, Milda (8 September 2015). "Filmo "Radviliada" kūrėjams didikų barzdų teko ieškoti užsienyje" (in Lithuanian). Lrt.lt.
- Lukšaitė, Ingė (1999). Reformacija Lietuvos Didžiojoje Kunigaikštystėje ir Mažojoje Lietuvoje (in Lithuanian). Baltos lankos. ISBN 9986-861-76-4.
- Lulewicz, Henryk (1987). "Jan Radwan". Polish Biographical Dictionary (in Polish). Vol. XXX.
- Narbutas, Sigitas (1998). Tradicija ir originalumas Jono Radvano "Radviliadoje" (PDF) (in Lithuanian). Vilnius: Lietuvių literatūros ir tautosakos institutas. pp. 93–133. ISBN 9986-513-25-1.
- Narbutas, Sigitas (2006). "Jono Radvano "Radviliada" anuo metu ir dabar" (PDF). Lietuvos mokslų akademijos biblioteka (in Lithuanian). 2003/2004. ISSN 1648-9772.
- Narbutas, Sigitas (2011). "Jonas Radvanas". In Narbutas, Sigitas (ed.). Senosios Lietuvos literatūra 1253–1795 (in Lithuanian). Vilnius: Lietuvių literatūros ir tautosakos institutas. ISBN 978-609-425-049-1.
- Mičiulienė, Jūratė (21 November 2011). "Karingos tautos turi savo epus. Kuo mes prastesni?" (in Lithuanian). Lietuvos žinios.
- Mickūnaitė, Giedrė (2006). Making a great ruler: Grand Duke Vytautas of Lithuania. Central European University Press. ISBN 978-963-7326-58-5.
- Patiejūnienė, Eglė (2002). "Lietuvos herojinės poemos ir Andriaus Rimšos. "Dešimtmetis pasakojimas": paminklai didvyriams ir bičiuliškas bendražygio portretas" (PDF). Acta Academiae Artium Vilnensis (in Lithuanian). 24. ISSN 1392-0316.
- Patiejūnienė, Eglė (2012–2014). "Jono Radvano "Radviliada" – lietuviškojo imperializmo tekstas". Orbis Lituaniae – Lietuvos Didžiosios Kunigaikštystės istorijos (in Lithuanian). Vilnius University. Archived from the original on 24 November 2015.
- Pociūtė-Abukevičienė, Dainora. "Radvanas". Šaltiniai.info (in Lithuanian). Lietuvių literatūros ir tautosakos institutas, Vilniaus universiteto Filologijos ir Istorijos fakultetai.
- Radvanas, Jonas (2007). "Epitalamijas šviesaus ir prakilnaus pono Kristupo Manvydo-Dorohostaiskio... ir kilmingiausios bei šviesiausios panelės Sofijos Chodkevičiūtės... vestuvėms, poetiškai pavaizduotas Jono Radvano" (PDF). Senoji Lietuvos literatūra. 23. Translated by Narbutas, Sigitas. ISSN 1822-3656.
- Vaškelienė, Asta (22 July 2019) [2011]. "Jonas Radavanas". Visuotinė lietuvių enciklopedija (in Lithuanian). Mokslo ir enciklopedijų leidybos centras.
