= Laurentius Boierus =

Swedish-Lithuanian poet (1561–1619)

- Born: c. 1561; Stockholm, Swedish Empire
- Died: c. 1619; Braniewo, Crown of the Kingdom of Poland, Polish-Lithuanian Commonwealth
- Other names: Laurencijus Bojeris
- Occupation(s): Poet, Jesuit lecturer, theologist
- Notable work: Carolomachia

Laurentius Boierus (born Boyer; Lithuanian: Laurencijus Bojeris; c. 1561 – c. 1619) was a Swedish-born Jesuit poet and theologian of the Polish-Lithuanian Commonwealth. Boierus is most known for Carolomachia, a heroic poem written in 1606 dedicated to the Polish-Lithuanian victory in the Battle of Kircholm over the Swedish army.

== Biography ==
=== Early life ===
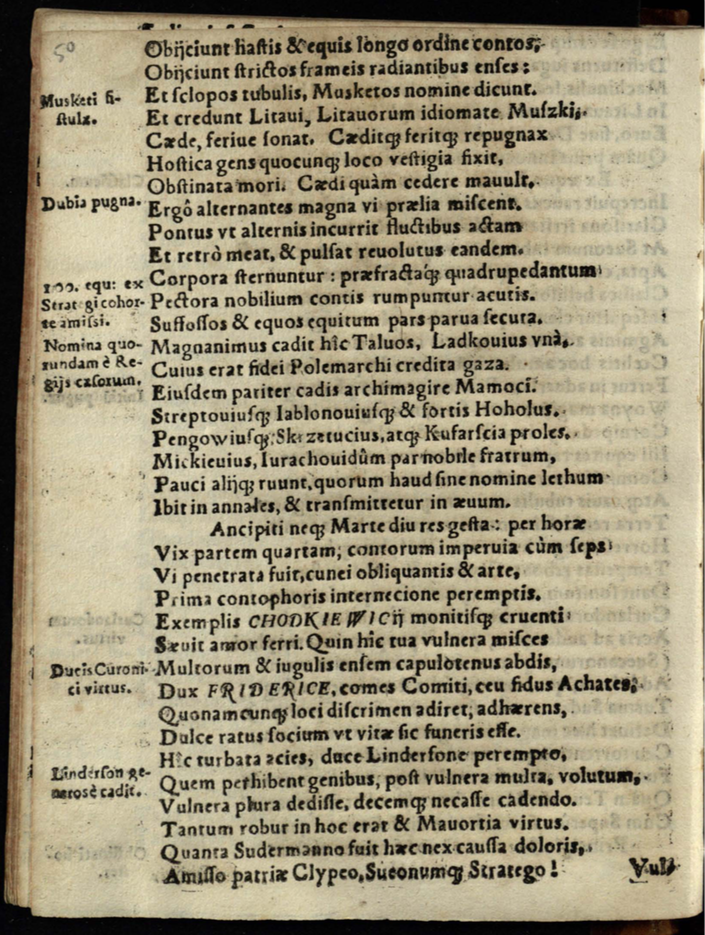
Excerpt page from Carolomachia

Laurentius Boierus was born around 1561 in Stockholm, Sweden. His father, Willem Boy (also spelled Boiij, Boyen), was an architect and painter who served the King of Sweden Gustav Vasa. It is thought that Boierus attended the Collegium regium Stockholmense, founded in 1567 by John III Vasa. It is believed that Boierus became acquainted with Jesuit diplomat Antonio Possevino. Possevino, Boierus, and other young Catholics left Stockholm to study in Prague, Olomouc, and Vilnius. After graduating from Prague's Clementinum, in 1579 Boierus moved to Olomouc. Boierus spent six years in the city studying philosophy despite the course only taking three years. He also contributed to the writing of a textbook in Swedish. From 1585 to 1587 Boierus studied theology in Vilnius University. In Vilnius, Boierus joined the poetic activities of the university's students and wrote commemorative poems which were published in 1587. The poems had panegyric and satire elements. In one epigram, Boierus praises the defender of Catholicism, Andriejus Jurgevičius, and in another, Boierus condemns Jurgevičius' opponent, the Calvinist Andreas Volanus, making fun of his surname. Some sources mention that Boierus wrote scenic dialogues, panegyrics, and philosophical treatises. The same year, on 20 August 1587, he officially joined the Jesuits in Kraków. He lectured in the Tartu Jesuit College from 1595 to 1597.

=== Jesuit lecturer ===
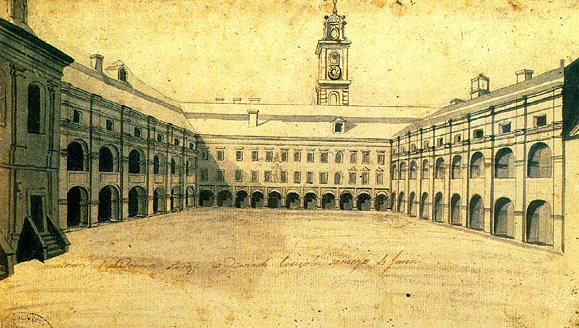
Courtyard of Vilnius University, c. 1785 by Franciszek Smuglewicz

In 1594 he was ordained as a priest. From 1598 to 1601 Boierus lectured in the Jarosław Jesuit pedagogical seminary, and from 1598 to 1600 was a prefect of the Tartu Jesuit pedagogical seminary. Boierus worked intermittently at Possevino's interpreters' seminary (Seminarium interpretum Derpatense) in Tartu, which was intended for the development of Eastern and Northern European language translators for languages such as Swedish, Estonian, Russian, Polish, and German. It is thought that Konstantinas Sirvydas might have been Boierus's student. Between 1601 and 1603 Boierus was Laurentius Nicolai's assistant in Braniewo, Poland. Around 1603 he moved to Vilnius, where he lectured poetics, rhetoric, theology, and mathematics at Vilnius University. Boierus was reportedly gifted in scientific studies and knew Latin, ancient Greek, Italian, German, Swedish, and Estonian. A few years after his studies Boierus lectured in various seminars. While in Vilnius Boierus published Carolomachia in Latin; it was published under the name of Krzysztof Zawisza, then a student of Vilnius University, because Jesuit law prohibited authors from publishing poems with their own names.

=== Later years ===
Around 1610 Boierus left for Braniewo, where he lectured theology until 1612. He also lectured rhetoric in Nyasvizh from 1615 to 1616, and spent the remainder of his life from 1618 to 1619 as a study prefect in Braniewo. Boierus died there on either 3 February or 13 May.
