= Jan Abramowicz =

Lithuanian noble (died 1602)

Starosta of Lida
- Reign: 1579–1602

Starosta of Wenden
- Reign: 1590–1602

Voivode of Minsk
- Reign: 1593–1602
- Predecessor: Jonas Pacas
- Successor: Andrius Zaviša

Voivode of Smolensk
- Reign: 1596–1602
- Predecessor: Filon Kmita
- Successor: Petras Dorohostaiskis
- Born: Grand Duchy of Lithuania
- Died: 19 June 1602
- Spouses: Jadwiga Żyromska; Anna Wołłowicz
- Issue: Mikołaj Abramowicz, Catherine, Maryna
- Religion: Calvinist

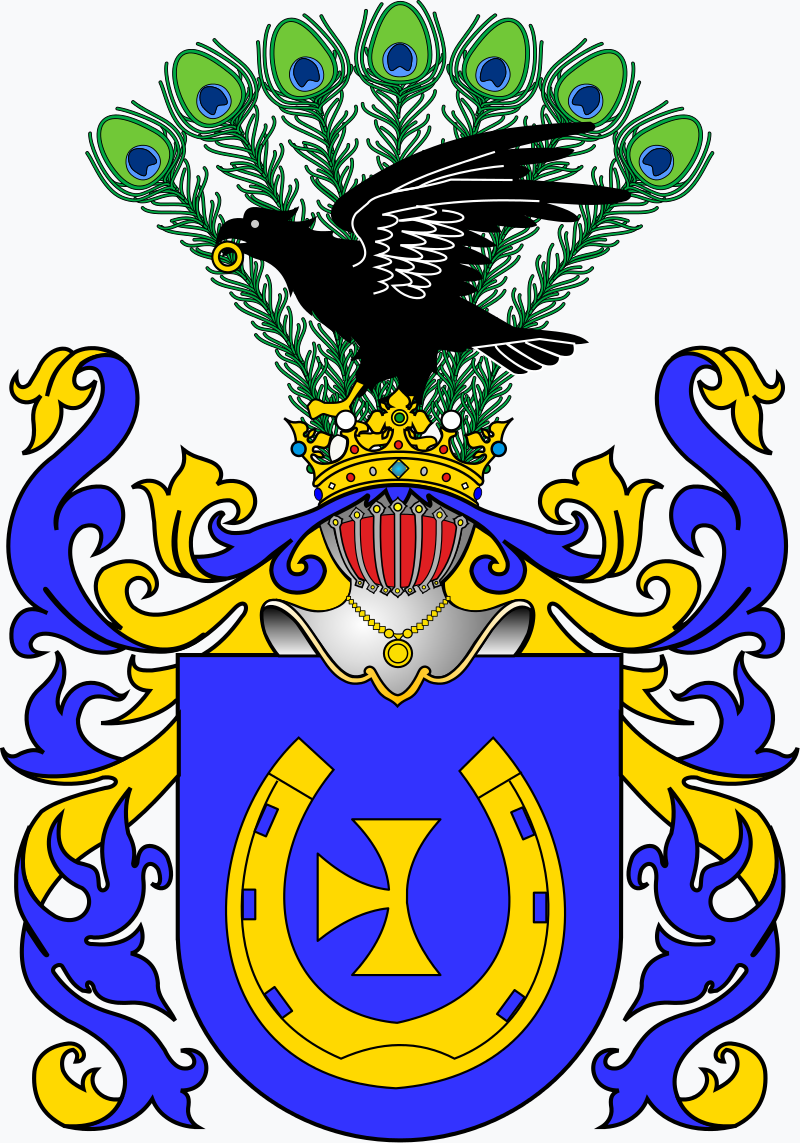

Jan Abramowicz (Lithuanian: Jonas Abramavičius; died 19 June 1602) was a nobleman in the Grand Duchy of Lithuania and one of the leaders of Calvinism in the country. He also propelled the creation of the Radivilias epic by encouraging Jonas Radvanas to work on it.

== Biography ==
=== Early life ===
Little is known about his early life, besides that he was brought up to the court of Mikołaj "the Red" Radziwiłł, then the Grand Hetman of Lithuania. His ancestry is unknown, but he is associated with nobility and the influential magnate family of the Radziwiłłs, which could have helped him gain higher positions.

=== Ascension to leadership ===
Mikołaj Radziwiłł was his patron. He participated with him alongside king Stephen Báthory in expeditions in Muscovite lands, and from 1579 he became the starosta of Lida. In 1581, Abramowicz had a dispute over episcopal jurisdiction with a representative bishop of the Radziwiłł family. In 1585, he supported the Livonian lands joining the Grand Duchy of Lithuania instead of them being a dominion of the Polish crown.

In 1590, he became the starost of Wenden. At this point, he was the starost of two different places in Livonia. In 1593, he became a senator of the Commonwealth. Around this time Abramowicz was involved in various religious dealings like disputes between the Jesuits and the Calvinists in Lithuania, becoming the leader of the latter. In the same year, he became the voivode of Minsk.

=== Later career and voivode ===
In 1596, he became the voivode of Smolensk through the intercession of Krzysztof Radziwiłł, whom he thanked in a letter. In 1599 he was chosen as a commissioner by the Protestant-Orthodox Vilnius Confederation. On his estate, Abramowicz built a Calvinist church, hospital, and school. Abramvičius wrote several essays, with one of them concerning the Lithuanian economy: "The Lithuanian opinion about buying grain cheaply and selling grain expensively."

== Family ==
He was at first married to Jadwiga Żyromska, with whom did not have any children. In 1588, he married an Orthodox woman Anna Wołłowicz, and had three children:

- Mikołaj Abramowicz, Voivode of Trakai
- Catherine, wife of castellan of Mstsislaw Konstanty Hołowczyński
- Maryna, wife of castellan of Smolensk Piotr Rudomina-Dusiacki
