= Boris Khazanov =

Russian writer (1928–2022)

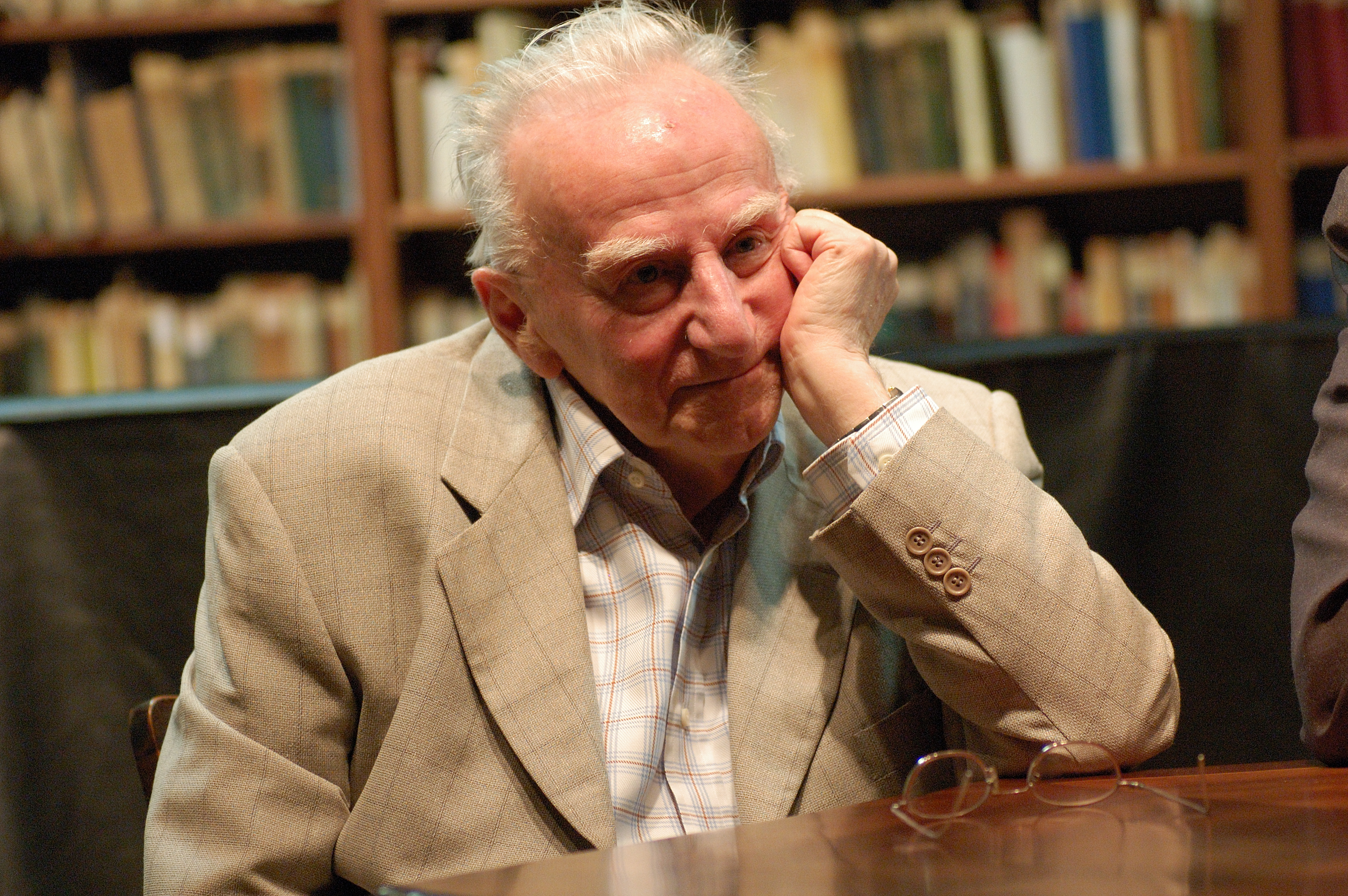
- Khazanov in 2008
- Born: Gennady Moiseevich Faibusovich; 16 January 1928; Leningrad, Russian SFSR, Soviet Union
- Died: 11 January 2022 (aged 93); Munich, Germany
- Occupation: Writer

Boris Khazanov (Russian: Борис Хазанов; 16 January 1928 – 11 January 2022) was a Russian writer.

== Biography ==
Khazanov studied at the philology department of the Moscow State University. At the last year of studies he was arrested for anti-Sovietism and from 1949 to 1955 he was imprisoned in Unzhlag. After his release, he became a doctor and began writing books. In 1982, he moved to Munich, and from 1983 to 1993, worked for Radio Free Europe. In 1998, the city of Heidelberg awarded him the Hilde-Domin-Preis für Literatur im Exil. In addition to writing, he translated the works of philosopher Gottfried Wilhelm Leibniz into Russian.

Boris Khazanov died in Munich on 11 January 2022 at the age of 93.

== Publications ==
- Mythos Russland: Betrachtungen aus deutscher Zuflucht (1986)
- Gegenzeit (1986)
- Die Königsstunde (1990)
- Unten ist Himmel (1993)
- Der Zauberlehrer (1996)
- Vögel über Moskau (1998)
