= Ignas Šeinius =

Lithuanian writer and diplomat (1889–1959)

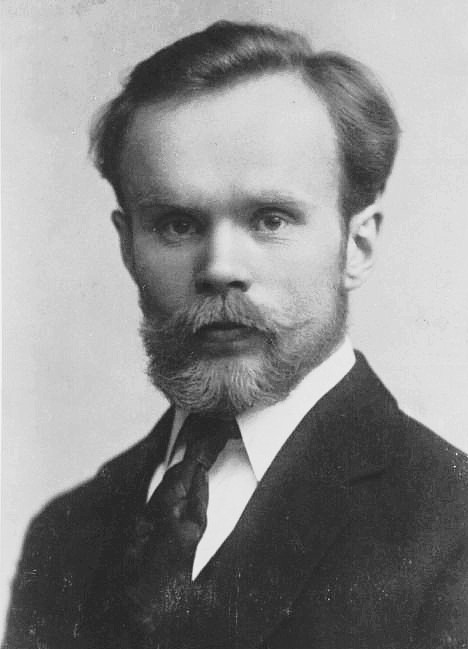
- Born: Ignas Jurkūnas; 2 April 1889; Šeiniūnai, Russian Empire
- Died: 15 January 1959 (aged 69); Stockholm, Sweden
- Education: Shaniavskii Moscow City People's University
- Occupations: Writer, diplomat, publicist, translator
- Spouse: Gertrud Sydoff
- Children: Irvis Scheynius
- Writing career
- Genres: Impressionism, satire, psychology
- Notable works: Kuprelis (1913), Siegfried Immerselbe atsijaunina (1934)

Ignas Jurkūnas (2 April 1889 – 15 January 1959), best known by his pen name Ignas Šeinius, was a Lithuanian-Swedish writer, publicist, and diplomat. Šeinius worked as a diplomat for the interwar Lithuania in the Nordic states, to which he immigrated after the Soviet occupation of Lithuania. He is best known for his novel Kuprelis (The Hunchback), which, along with Šeinius' other novels, was at the forefront of impressionism in the Lithuanian literature.

== Biography ==
=== Early years ===
Ignas Jurkūnas was born on 2 April 1889 to a family of Lithuanian peasants in the village of Šeiniūnai, from which he would eventually create his pen name. He attended schools in both Gelvoniai and Musninkai. In 1908, he finished teachers' courses in Kaunas and Vilnius, and in the same year he passed an exam in St. Petersburg which officially allowed him to become a teacher. From then on he would be involved in the press, usually creating and publishing short poems.

=== Studies in Moscow ===
In 1912, he moved to Moscow where he studied art and philosophy at the Shaniavskii Moscow City People's University until 1915. During this time, he met with some notable Lithuanian writers, such as Juozas Tumas-Vaižgantas and Jurgis Baltrušaitis, among others, who encouraged the young Šeinius to write. In 1913, he published his best-known novel, Kuprelis. The novel was not very popular in Lithuania and was heavily re-edited and re-published by Šeinius in 1932. He also translated Nietzsche's Thus Spoke Zarathustra from German to Lithuanian.

=== Diplomatic work in northern Europe ===
In 1915, he was sent to Stockholm to represent the prominent Lithuanian Society for the Relief of War Sufferers. In Stockholm, he quickly learned Swedish and in 1917 he published Litauisk Kultur (Lithuanian Culture), among other articles about Lithuanian culture. In summer 1915, he married Gertrud Sydoff, who was of Swedish descent. Their son Irvis was born in 1922.

In 1919, after Lithuania gained its independence, he was appointed head of the press office of the Lithuanian representation in Stockholm. From 1919 to 1920, he worked to represent Lithuania in Copenhagen, and briefly in Finland from 1922 to 1923, where he was partly responsible for preventing the signing of the Warsaw Accord, in which Lithuania would theoretically be isolated from the Baltic states, Poland and Finland. In 1923, he returned to Swedish affairs and up until 1927 was the Lithuanian representative to Sweden. During his diplomatic tenure in Sweden, he contributed to the development of economic and cultural relations between Lithuania and Sweden to gain support for Lithuania's stance on the issues of Vilnius and Klaipėda on the international stage.

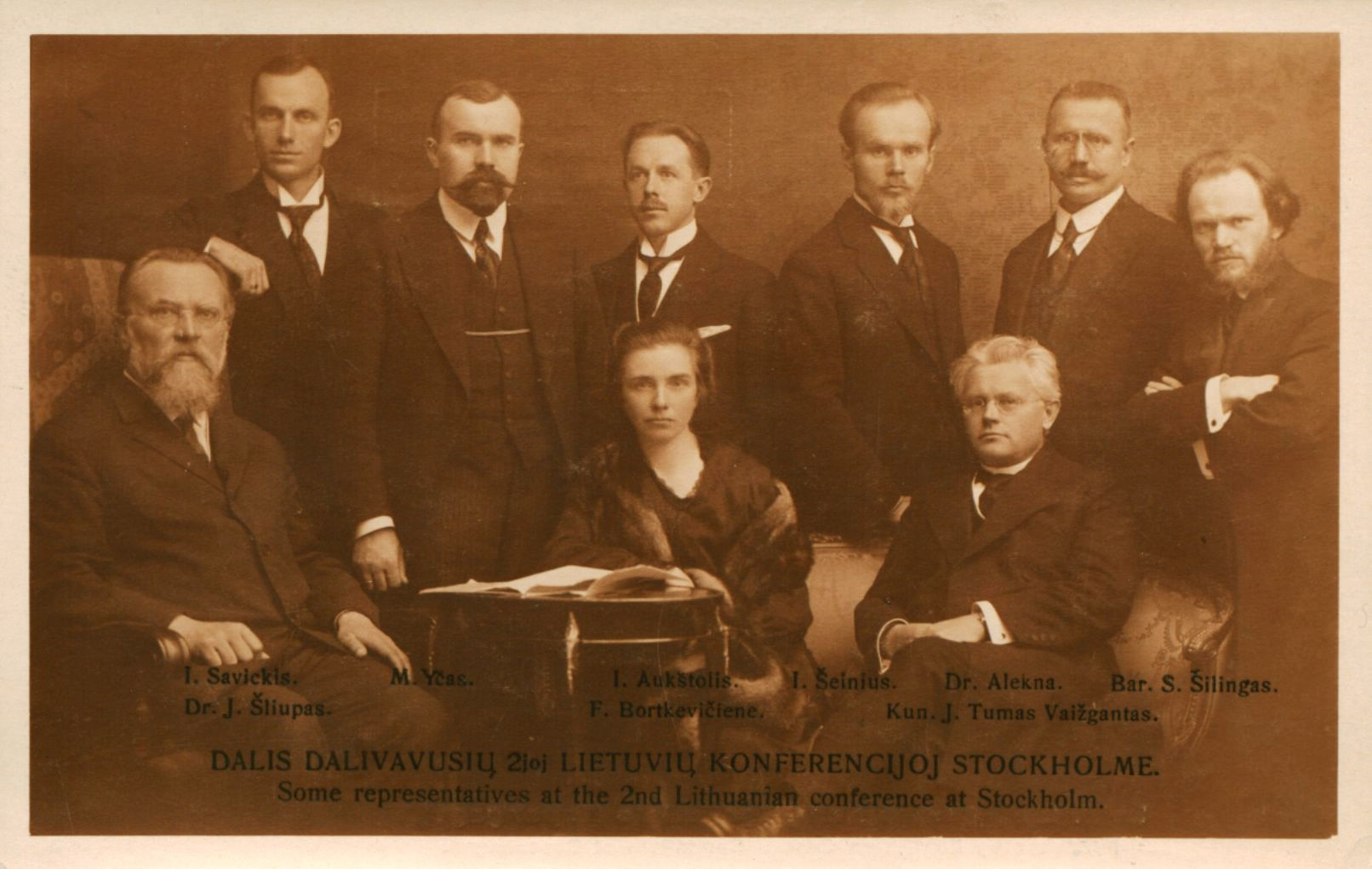
Lithuanian delegates at the Stockholm conference in 1917. Šeinius stands fourth from left

The December 1926 coup saw a change of political leadership, enabling Antanas Smetona and Augustinas Voldemaras to form a new government. Conflict with Voldemaras, who was the new chief of foreign affairs, arose, and Šeinius was forced to resign from his work in diplomacy in 1927, as the nationalist party in Lithuania closed embassies in the Nordic states. Šeinius then, until 1930, worked for private firms and paid more attention to his creative work.

=== Emigration and later years ===
Sometime in the early 1930s, he returned to Kaunas, Lithuania. He worked as an editor of the newspaper Lietuvos aidas and also engaged in larger personal creative work. From 1935 he worked in Klaipėda as the governor's press consultant. After Lithuania was occupied in 1940, Šeinius emigrated to Sweden, in which he changed his surname to Scheynius and ceased to write in Lithuanian, writing novels mainly in Swedish, the most popular of which is I Väntan På Undret (Waiting for the Miracle). In 1943, he received Swedish citizenship and lived there until his death in 1959.

== Literary work ==
Šeinius already was publishing small feuilletons back in 1910. During his active years, he used many different pen names, like Irvis Gedainis. Šeinius was the progenitor of impressionism in the Lithuanian literature. The main themes of his earlier novels were usually unhappy love and its stoic survival. Šeinius' prose also included themes of psychology. His novels, such as Siegfried Immerselbe atsijaunina (Siegfried Immerselbe Rejuvenates) published in 1934, combine features of science-fiction, politics, and satire, and grotesquely satirize the theories of racism, Nazism and eugenics. After 1940, he mainly published anti-Soviet themed books in Swedish, Danish and Lithuanian, such as Den Röda Floden Stiger (The Red Flood), Den Röda Resan (The Red Journey).

Kuprelis is the most prominent of Šeinius' works. It follows Olesis, a miller who gradually recounts his life story to another person as the flour of the windmill is being milled. Olesis, also known as Kuprelis, has been hunchbacked since childhood, and is also poor, but is gifted with artistic talents and a sensitive heart. Realizing his sad fate, and wanting to become closer to God and to art, he decides to become a church organist. He falls in love with Kunigunda (Gundė), but she deceives him and leaves him for someone who holds possession of stolen money and is more attractive. Olesis becomes disillusioned with God, settles far from his birthplace, and becomes a hermit who reads various, mostly German philosophical books. Kuprelis not only tells the events consistently but also stops at the most important places, reflects on them, and comments on them from the perspective of time. Such a plot and narrative composition were new in Lithuanian literature. The theme of nature is important in the novel also – the colors and moods of nature correspond to the inner feelings of the characters. The novel takes place during the time of the Lithuanian press ban, so the theme of Lithuania, the struggle for national consciousness is developed in parallel with the love line of the young people.
