= Dalia Grinkevičiūtė =

Lithuanian doctor and author

Dalia Grinkevičiūtė (1927–1987) was a Lithuanian physician and writer. She is best known for her memoirs of exile and repression by the Soviet Union. These were published in multiple editions, starting in 1979. They are now part of the Lithuanian school curriculum and have been translated into English and German.

== Biography ==
She was born in Kaunas and studied at the local girls' gymnasium. After the Soviet occupation of Lithuania, the family was exiled in the first wave of deportations that took place in June 1941. Dalia's father was separated from the rest of the family and died in the Urals. Dalia, her mother, and her brother were first sent to the Altai region and then transported to Trofimovsk (Russian: Трофимовск), a prison island in the Lena River delta far beyond the Arctic Circle. Many of the deportees died of cold and starvation.

In 1948, Dalia was given permission to attend college in Yakutsk. Although banned, Dalia's mother boarded the steamer with her. They were discovered and Dalia was sent to the Khangalas coal mine. When the mine closed, she went to Yakutsk and re-united with her mother.

In 1949, together with her mother, she managed to escape and returned to Lithuania, hiding out in the homes of friends and relatives in Kaunas for a year. Her mother died and was buried while still in hiding. Dalia was rearrested and sent to Unzhlag camp in Sukhobezvodnoye in the Gorky Oblast. In 1953, she was once again exiled to Yakutia but the following year, as conditions eased following the death of Stalin, she gained the right to study medicine at Omsk. Returning once more to Kaunas, she continued her medical education there, graduating in 1960 (at the age of 33) from the local medical school. She went to work as a doctor in Laukuva in the Šilalė District. She worked until 1974, when she was dismissed from her job by the Soviet authorities and even deprived of her service apartment.

Grinkevičiūtė died at the age of sixty in 1987, and is buried in the Eiguliai Cemetery in Kaunas.

== Memoir ==
Grinkevičiūtė left two versions of her memoir. The first, incomplete but more detailed, were written in 1949–1950. They were hidden in a jar in Grinkevičiūtė's garden and discovered in 1991. The text was deciphered and published by the Vytautas the Great War Museum in 1996. The English translation, Shadows on the Tundra, by Delija Valiukenas was published by Peirene Press in 2018. Her second memoir was published in the Russian dissident samizdat Memory (Память) in 1979. In Lithuania, her memoir was first published in 1988. It was translated into English and published in the Lituanus magazine in 1990.
