= Mikołaj Abramowicz =

Polish–Lithuanian nobleman (died 1651)

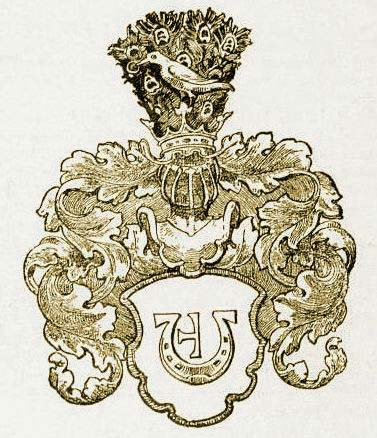
Abramowicz coat of arms

Mikołaj Abramowicz or Abrahamowicz (Lithuanian: Mikalojus Abrahamovičius; 1590s – 1651) was a Polish–Lithuanian soldier who was one of the leading military and diplomatic figures of his period.

== Life ==
A nobleman (szlachcic) of the Jastrzębiec coat of arms, Mikołaj Abramowicz was the son of Smolensk voivode (governor) Jan Abramowicz. His birth documents have not survived, but it is recorded that he served as the senior cannon officer (artillery leader) during the 1621–22 war with Sweden. In subsequent conflicts with Sweden, he fought in the failed 1625 campaign, capturing the bridge crossing at Daugava, and particularly distinguished himself as a regimental commander during the 1626–29 war, in the Battle of Vistula.

As one of the last Protestant leaders in the predominantly Catholic region, he granted his Lutsk mansion to the Lithuanian Calvinist synod for use as an evangelical school.

Returning to military service, Abramowicz served in the 1633–34 Smolensk War and, holding the rank of colonel, was one of the negotiators in the June 1634 Treaty of Polyanovka, which ended the conflict. In 1638 King Władysław IV Vasa nominated him as Cześnik Wielki Litewski (Great Grand Duke's Cup-Bearer of Lithuania). He rose to the office of castellan of Mścisław in 1639, General (top commander) of the artillery of Lithuania in 1640, Voivode of Mścisław in 1643, and voivode of Trakai in 1647.

In view of Abramowicz's prominent activity in the Lithuanian Calvinist synod at a time of increased Counter-Reformation in the Commonwealth, his ability to retain high offices, was taken as sign of King Władysław's faith in his leadership. The confidence proved particularly well-founded during the 1645 event known as the Trubchevsk incident (incydent trubecki), as Lithuanian nobles rose in opposition to the king's treaty with Russia, which signed away the fortified border town of Trubchevsk. The king sent Abramowicz at the head of a company of King's Guards to restore order and oversee the territorial transfer. In the aftermath, the Lithuanian Tribunal lodged a high complaint against Abramowicz for illegal expropriation of property and sentenced him to loss of honor, banishment and a high compensatory damage. The sentences were never carried out due to the intervention of the king, who rewarded Abramowicz's loyalty with advancement to the Trakai Voivodeship.

In the final three years of his life, Abramowicz served as a diplomat in the 1648 negotiations with Sweden, and in the Senate talks of 1649. In his final public function, he signed the Senate resolution known as the Evangelical Salvation, providing certain rights to Calvinists. He died in Vilnius in his early to mid-fifties.
