= Siegfried Immerselbe atsijaunina =

1934 science fiction satire novel by Ignas Šeinius

- 1934 cover, Martynas Mažvydas National Library of Lithuania
- Author: Ignas Šeinius
- Language: Lithuanian
- Genre: Science fiction; political fiction; satire
- Set in: Nazi Germany, Fascist Italy
- Publisher: Sakalas, printed by Žaibas
- Publication date: 1934, Kaunas
- Publication place: Lithuania
- English publication date: 1965, New York

Siegfried Immerselbe Rejuvenates (Lithuanian: Siegfried Immerselbe atsijaunina), also known as The Rejuvenation of Siegfried Immerselbe, is a novel by Lithuanian writer and diplomat Ignas Šeinius. Written in 1934, it is a satirical comedy of the policies and ideologies of Nazi Germany, such as Nazism, eugenics, and racism. The book and its author have been both compared to George Orwell and Nineteen Eighty-Four.

== Background ==
Šeinius was stationed in Klaipėda around the time of the novel's writing. The local German population mockingly called him Siegfried Immerselbe, which later became the name of the novel's main protagonist.

== Summary ==
Siegfried Immerselbe, an old and repulsive man, is an ideological architect of Nazi Germany and strongly supports the policies of Adolf Hitler. Under his initiative, the Munich anthropology museum is built, where stereotypical characteristics of various European ethnicities and other races are portrayed in contrast to the German race. Tired from work and old age, he travels to a small city in northern Italy to visit a special rejuvenation sanatorium headed by Professor Gonzano and his protege, the Lithuanian assistant Petras Inketonis, whose parents were killed by Siegfried Immerselbe during the war, though Siegfried himself does not remember it and Inketonis does not recognize Siegfried. The sanatorium is home to numerous isolated patients, including some high-profile historical figures. Siegfried Immerselbe is injected with Jewish hormones and experiences spiritual rebirth, becomes a youthful and attractive man who falls in love with a Jewish woman. Siegfried goes on to write a long political, scientific and philosophical manuscript entitled New Foundations of Humanity, critiquing his home country and its policies.

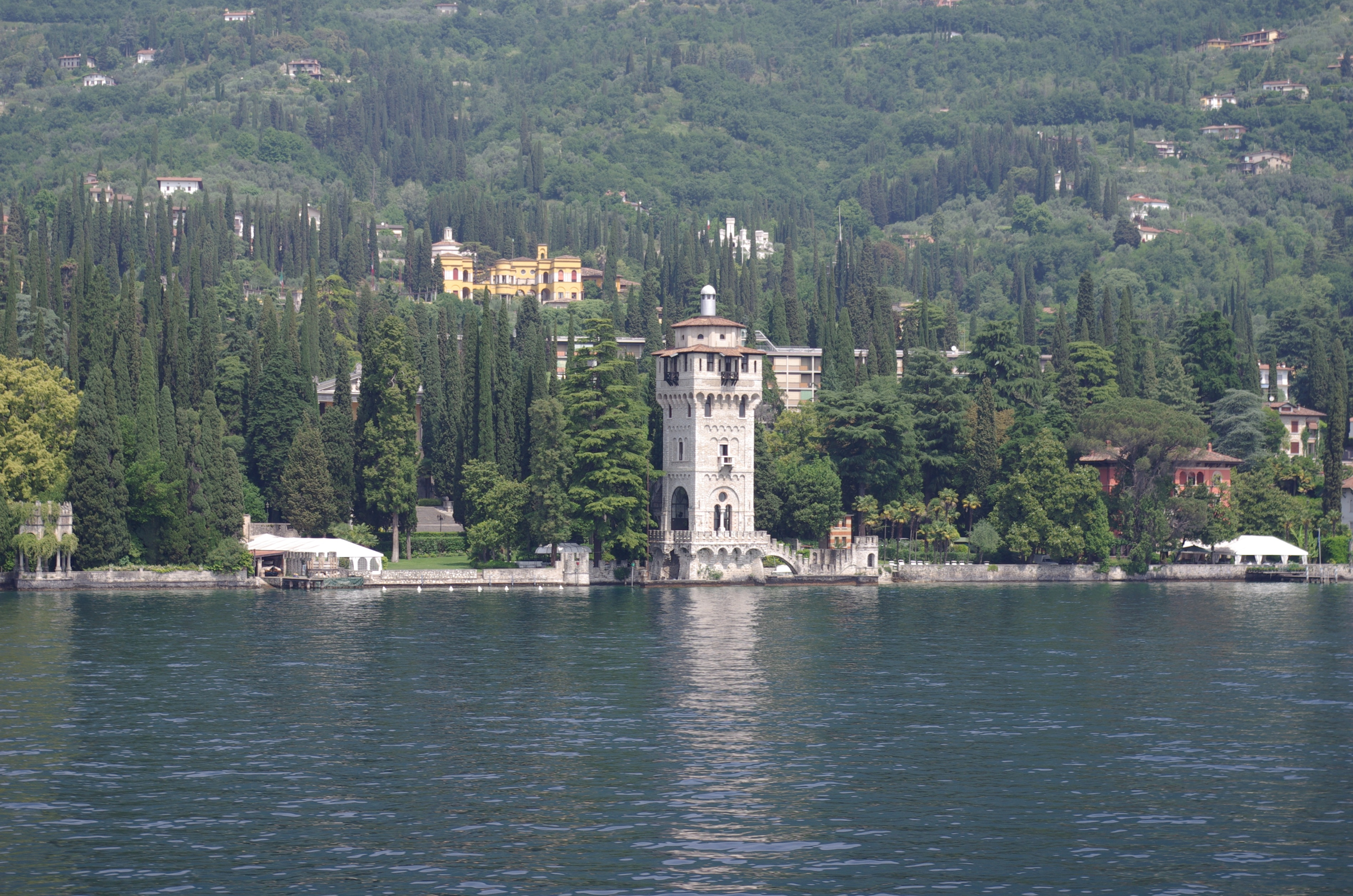
The town of Gardone Riviera is likely the inspiration for the location of the sanatorium

== Publication history ==
The book was translated into English in 1965 by Albinas Baranauskas and published in New York. A play based on the novel was staged in Lithuania in 2019. The novel was republished in Lithuanian in the same year.

== See also ==
- Lithuanian literature
