= Unzhlag =

Camp of the GULAG system of labor camps in the Soviet Union

Coordinates: 57°43′7″N 44°48′57″E

Unzhlag or Unzhensky ITL (Unzhensky corrective labor camp) (Russian: Унжлаг, Унженский ИТЛ) was a camp of the GULAG system of labor camps in the Soviet Union. Named after the Unzha River, it has headquarters at the railway station Sukhobezvodnoye (Сухобезводное, Сухобезводная), Gorky Oblast. It operated from February 5, 1938 to 1960. The main operation was logging and wood processing industries, but also served a wide variety of other small-scale industries: construction, metalworking, railroad servicing, clothing, footwear, pottery production, etc. The camp had 30 sites (lagpunkts).

There is a small museum of Unzhlag on the private property of a local lore enthusiast Mikhail Shulegin in the village Yurovo, Makaryevsky District.

== Notable inmates ==
- Yusif Vazir Chamanzaminli (1887-1943), Azerbaijani statesman and writer (imprisoned 1940, died January 1943)
- Dalia Grinkevičiūtė, Lithuanian school girl deported in June 1941 who later wrote a memoir about her experiences
- Ahmad Jafarzade (1929-2000), Azerbaijani writer, brother of Aziza Jafarzade, who was imprisoned for his poem, "Hey, Yusif" critical of Joseph Stalin. Ahmad survived the GULAG (both at Unzhlag and Kolyma), and after the Soviet Union collapsed in 1991, he published poetry that he had collected from fellow prisoners and a description of the terror that Azerbaijanis had experienced in everyday life in 1937 and the traditional tortures used to extract confessions in Baku's NKVD prison in the 1940s.
- Boris Khazanov, Russian writer
- Lev Kopelev describes his experience in Unzhlag in his book, To Be Preserved Forever.
- Karl Kullisaar (16 November 1905 – 1 March 1942), Estonian wrestler and sports figure.
- Yanka Shutovich, Belarusian literary critic, publisher, and cultural activist; served some of his time in Unzhlag, among several other camps.
- Harald Tammer, Estonian journalist, athlete and weightlifter; died in Unzhlag
- Mikhail Yakubovich, Russian revolutionary and Soviet statesman, Menshevik.

== Gallery ==
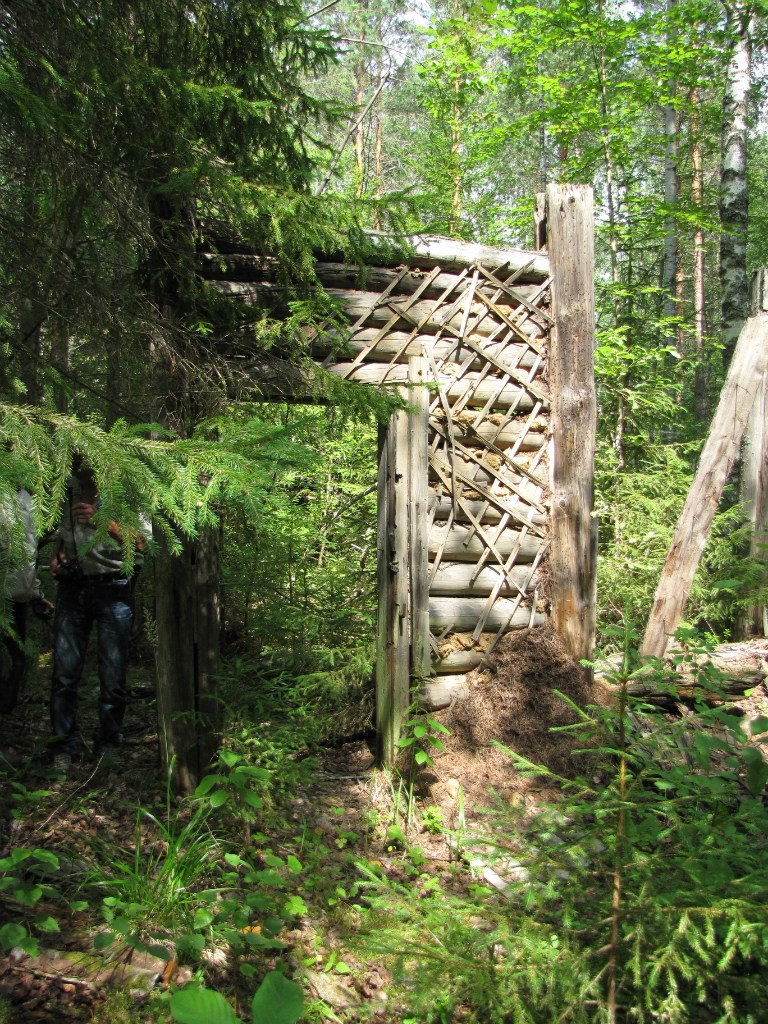
Barracks leftovers

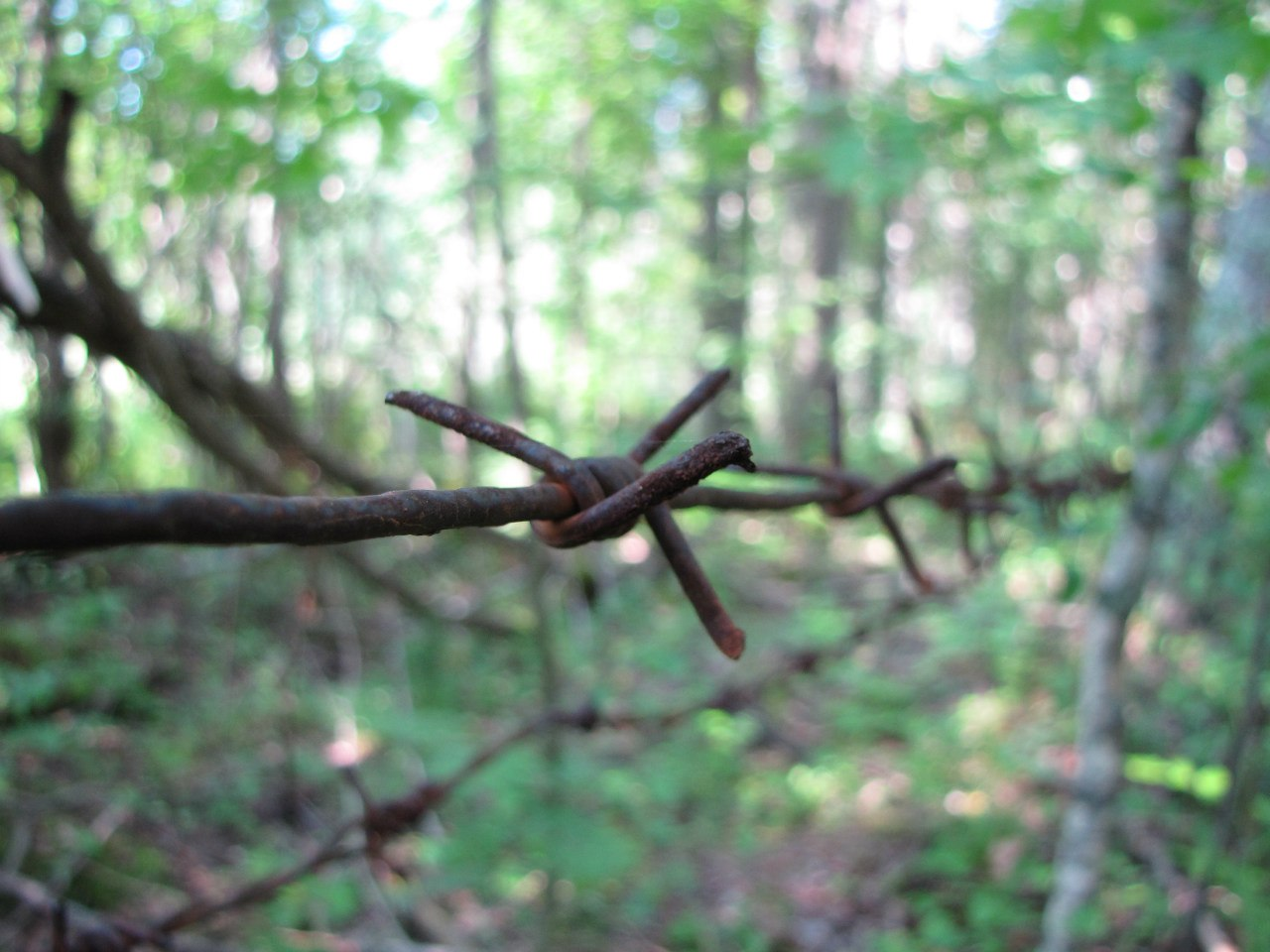
Barbed wire fense leftovers

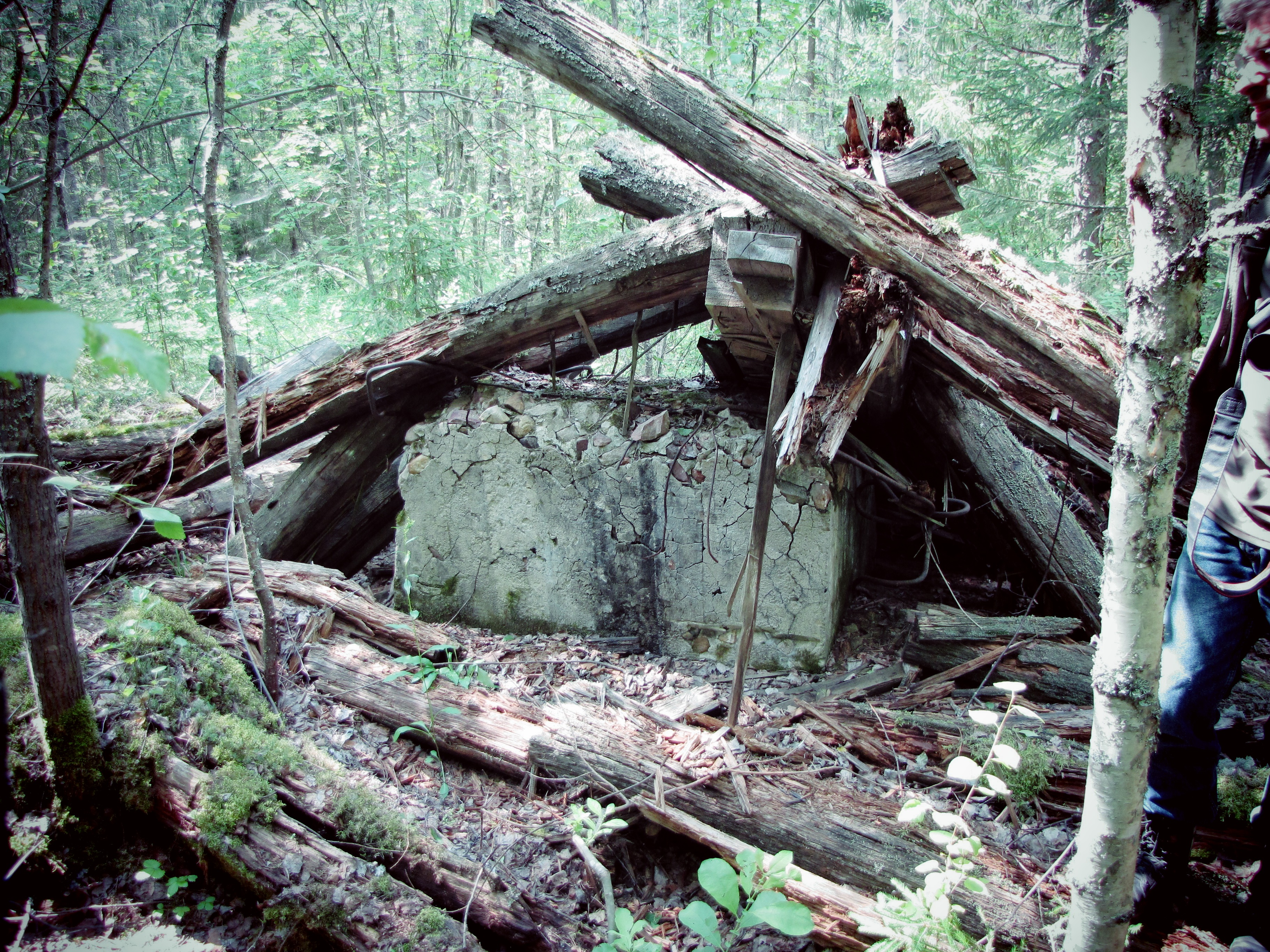
"Birzha" site leftovers

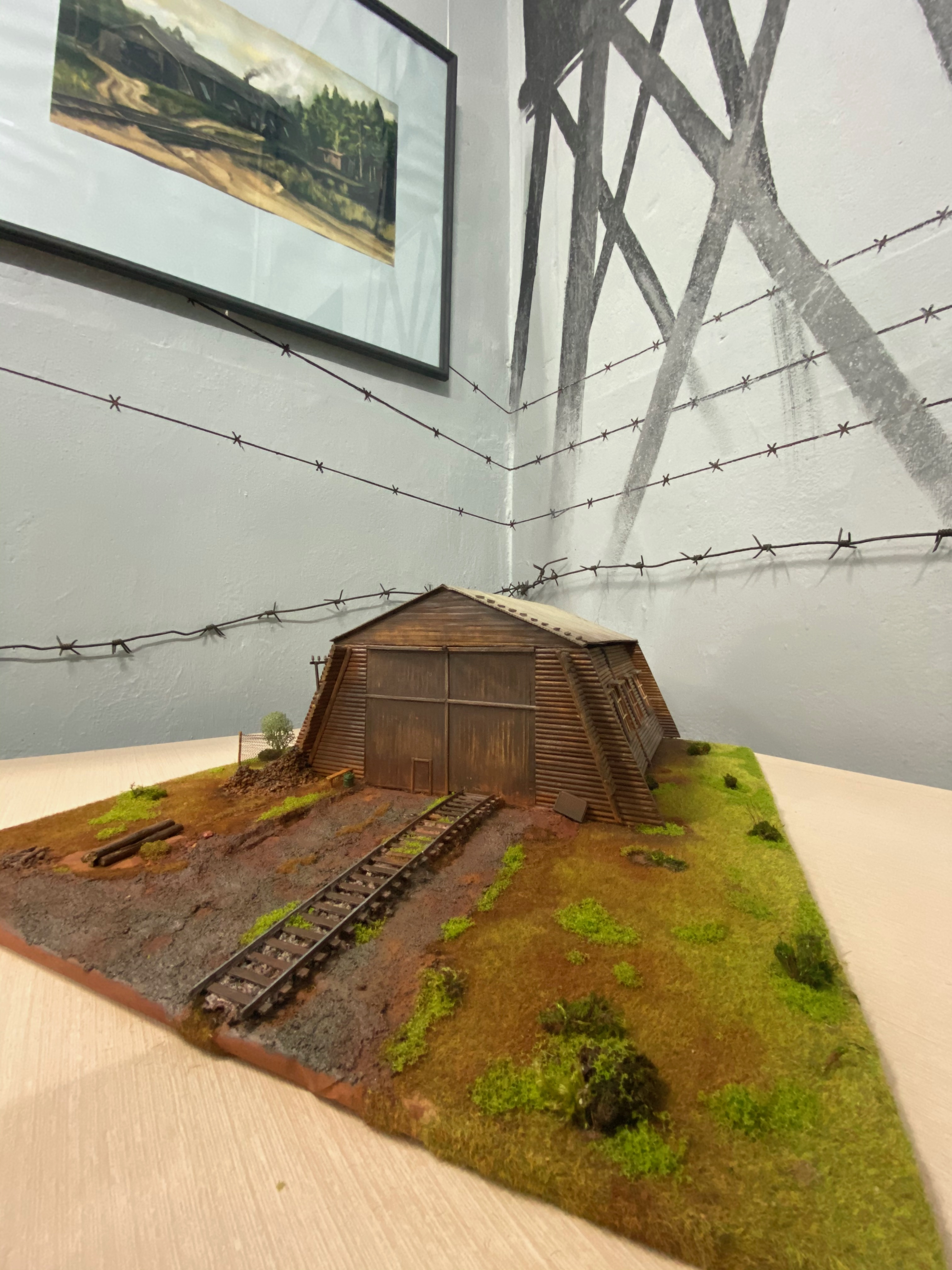
Depot model, Unzhlag museum
