= Henrikas Radauskas =

Lithuanian rebel of art

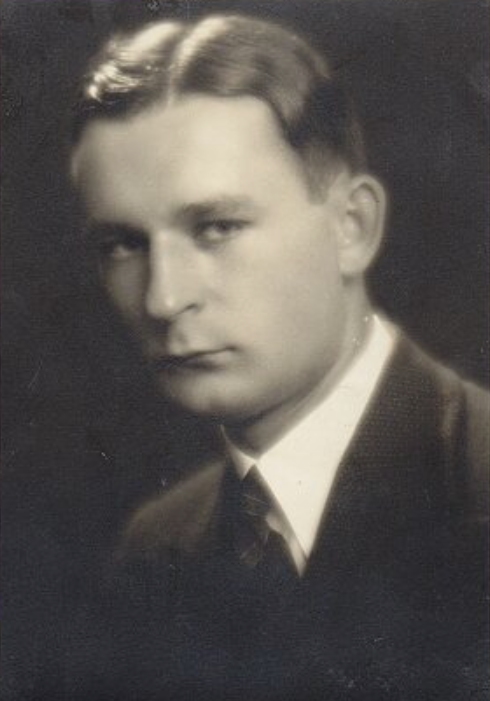
- Born: 23 April 1910; Kraków, Austria-Hungary
- Died: 27 August 1970 (aged 60); Washington, D.C., United States
- Education: Vytautas Magnus University
- Occupations: Poet, writer
- Spouse: Vera Sotnikovaitė

Henrikas Radauskas (23 April 1910 – 27 August 1970) was a Lithuanian poet and writer. Described as an "art alcoholic" by the contemporary Alfonsas Nyka-Niliūnas, Radauskas's works are marked by aestheticism, anti-lyricism, aesthetic distance, and poetic transformation of reality. He is described as "one of the most accomplished Baltic poets of the post-World War II years, and perhaps the greatest Lithuanian poet of the twentieth century".

== Biography ==
Radauskas was born on 23 April 1910 in Kraków, then part of Austria-Hungary. Radauskas's mother Amalija Kieragga was a Protestant from East Prussia. Radauskas spent his childhood in Panevėžys. However, the First World War forced his family to relocate to Novonikolayevsk, currently Novosibirsk, where he started attending school. His family returned to newly independent Lithuania in 1921. He studied at a teacher's seminary in Panevėžys, from which he graduated in 1929. Radauskas could speak the German, French, Russian, and Polish languages. Later, Radauskas studied Lithuanian, German and Russian literatures at the Vytautas Magnus University in Kaunas. Although a reserved person, Radauskas nonetheless attended Balys Sruoga's theater seminar, where he met his future wife Vera Sotnikovaitė. Despite graduating with exceptional grades, Radauskas did not write a thesis.

From 1934 to 1936 Radauskas worked in the university's library. By the suggestion of a friend, Radauskas became a radio announcer and hosted shows in Lithuanian and German in Klaipėda. From 1937 to 1941 he was an editor for the Lithuanian Commission of Book Publishing. Radauskas and his wife moved to Germany in 1944 and temporarily resided with his relative in Berlin. At the end of the Second World War, Radauskas moved again to Reutlingen, where he worked as a French translator. Radauskas emigrated to the United States in 1949. At first, Radauskas worked in factories. However, he soon got a job at the Library of Congress, becoming its official employee in 1959. In 1970, Radauskas was fired from his position due to staff reduction. That same year, on 27 August 1970, while working as an interpreter at a conference, Radauskas unexpectedly died.

== Bibliography ==
=== Collections of poems ===
- Fontanas ("Fountain", 1935)
- Strėlė danguje ("Arrow in the sky", 1950)
- Žiemos daina ("Winter song", 1955)
- Žaibai ir vėjai ("Poems", 1965)
- Eilėraščiai 1965-1970: pomirtinė poezijos knyga ("Poems 1965-1970," V. Saulius, Chicago, 1978)

=== Poetry in Translation ===
- Chimeras in the Tower [in English]. Selected Poems. Trans. by Jonas Zdanys. Wesleyan University Press, 1986.
- Ognem po nebesam = Ugnim ant debesų [in Russian]. Poems and biographical materials. Ed. and trans. by Anna Georgievna Gerasimova. Kaunas: Vytautas Magnus University, 2016.
