= Sukhobezvodnoye =

Sukhobezvodnoye Сухобезводное
- Urban-type settlement
- Interactive map of Sukhobezvodnoye
- Location of Sukhobezvodnoye Sukhobezvodnoye (Nizhny Novgorod Oblast)
- Coordinates: 57.0460°N 44.8926°E
- Country: Russia
- Federal subject: Nizhny Novgorod Oblast

Population (2010 Census)
  - Total: 6,376
  - Estimate (2025): 4,633 (−27.3%)
- Time zone: UTC+3 (MSK)
- Postal code: 606640
- OKTMO ID: 22737000056

Sukhobezvodnoye (Russian: Сухобезво́дное) is an urban locality (an urban-type settlement) in Nizhny Novgorod Oblast, Russia. Population: 6,376 (2010 census); 6,748 (2002 census); 4,546 (1989 Soviet census).

The headquarters of the Unzhlag forced labor camp of the Gulag system was at the Sukhobezvodnoye railroad station.
