= Andrzej Wolan =

Andrzej Wolan (Latin: Andreas Volanus, Lithuanian: Andrius Volanas; 1530 in Poznań – 1610 in Wolanów) was a secretary to the Grand Duke of Lithuania and an eminent Calvinist theologian. Volanus was involved with controversy about both Jesuits and the Ecclesia Minor or Polish Brethren. Fausto Sozzini's De Jesu Christi natura (1584) is a reply to Volanus.

== Biography ==
Andrzej Wolan was born around 1531 in Greater Poland, in the Kingdom of Poland, into a noble family originating from Silesia. In 1544, he began his studies at the University of Frankfurt (Oder). After returning to Poland, he lived with his relative Baltazar Strzeźmiński, a land judge, where he gained knowledge of legal practice and civic responsibility. He then traveled to Lithuania to the court of his uncle Hieronim Kwilecki, who recommended him to Mikołaj Radziwiłł the Red. Around 1550, he became Radziwiłł's secretary. However, he soon left for Königsberg, where he studied at the local academy for three years. He later took the position of honorary secretary to King Sigismund Augustus and began his philosophical and literary work.

He was active in writing against what he felt was unfair criticism of Queen Elizabeth of England's persecution of Catholics, for example exaggerating, "There were days under Mary when more victims were burnt than during the 24 years of Elizabeth’s reign."

His debut was the poem Do Polaków i Litwy (lit. 'To the Poles and Lithuania'), while his most important work was the political treatise De libertate politica sive civili libellus lectu non indignus (lit. 'A little book on political or civil liberty, not unworthy of being read'), published by Maciej Wirzbięta's printing house in Kraków. Wolan was married three times and left behind numerous offspring. He died in 1610 on his estate called Wolanów, Ashmyany.

== Works ==
- Caecitas et poena ecclesiae, libellus lectu dignissimus 1608
- Francisci Turriani ... Contra Andream Volanum ... de sanctissima eucharistia ...1577
- Paraenesis Andreae Volani ad omnes in regno Poloniae, Magnoque Ducatu Lituaniæ. 1582
- Andreæ Volani Ad beatissimum patrem, D. Hippolytum Aldebrandinum ... Oratio 1593
- De dignitate ordinis ecclesiastici regni Poloniæ 1582
- De libertate politica 1572

== Bibliography ==
- Marszk, Joanna (2017). "Wolność chroniona odpowiednimi prawami najcenniejszym skarbem — według traktatu Andrzeja Wolana De libertate politica sive civili libellus lectu nonindignus". Rocznik Filozoficzny Ignatianum. 23 (1): 128–149.
