= List of Lithuanian diplomats (1918–1940) =

List of Lithuanian diplomats includes Lithuanian diplomatic representatives – Chargés d'affaires ad interim (CDAI) and Envoys Extraordinary and Minister Plenipotentiary (Envoy) – of Lithuania in 1918–1940. The list does not include consuls. Some representatives continued after the Soviet occupation of Lithuania in June 1940 (see list of Lithuanian diplomats (1940–1990)).

== List ==
Country	Name	Title	From	To	Notes
Argentina	Petras Mačiulis		April 1, 1930		
Argentina	Teodoras Daukantas	CDAI	January 9, 1931	September 1, 1934	
Argentina	Jonas Aukštuolis	Envoy	September 1, 1934	September 1, 1939	
Argentina	Kazimieras Graužinis	Envoy	September 1, 1939	December 6, 1946	
Austria	Vaclovas Sidzikauskas	CDAI	April 5, 1924	July 7, 1925	Resided in Berlin
Austria	Vaclovas Sidzikauskas	Envoy	July 8, 1925	November 10, 1931	Resided in Berlin
Austria	Jurgis Šaulys	Envoy	February 24, 1932	1938	Until Anschluss; Resided in Berlin
Belgium	Oskaras Milašius		November 12, 1921		
Belgium	Petras Klimas	Envoy	March 22, 1926	1940	Until the German occupation of Belgium; Resided in Paris
Belgium	Vytautas Gylys	CDAI	March 1, 1934	November 30, 1937	Resided in Brussels
Belgium	Vytautas Stašinskas	Attaché, CDAI	November 30, 1938	February 25, 1940	Resided in Brussels
Belgium	Jonas Deksnys	Attaché, CDAI	1940	1940	Until the German occupation of Belgium
Brazil	Teodoras Daukantas	CDAI	January 9, 1931	September 1, 1934	
Brazil	Jonas Aukštuolis	Envoy	July 1, 1935	September 1, 1939	Resided in Buenos Aires, Argentina
Caucasus	Pranas Dailidė	Representative	July 23, 1918	October 9, 1921	Covered Armenia, Azerbaijan, Georgia; resided in Tbilisi
Czechoslovakia	Donatas Malinauskas	CDAI	March 7, 1922	June 4, 1923	
Czechoslovakia	Dovas Zaunius	Envoy	June 5, 1923	February 11, 1925	
Czechoslovakia	Juozas Brėdikis	Secretary, CDAI	February 1, 1926	July 1, 1932	
Czechoslovakia	Jonas Aukštuolis	Envoy	October 1, 1932	August 31, 1934	
Czechoslovakia	Edvardas Turauskas	Envoy	September 1, 1934	1939	Until the German occupation of Czechoslovakia
Denmark	Jurgis Savickis	Temporary representative	January 1, 1919	January 20, 1922	In Copenhagen
Denmark	Jurgis Savickis	CDAI	January 21, 1922	December 6, 1923	
Denmark	Jurgis Savickis	Envoy	January 1, 1930	December 1937	
Denmark	Ignas Šeinius	CDAI	December 1923	1927	
Denmark	Vytautas Gylys	Envoy	April 11, 1938		Until German occupation of Denmark; Resided in Stockholm, Sweden
Estonia	Pranas Vaičiuška		1919		
Estonia	Vytautas Gylys	Representative	February 24, 1920	July 30, 1921	
Estonia	Dovas Zaunius	CDAI	November 20, 1921	February 6, 1923	Resided in Riga, Latvia
Estonia	Jonas Aukštuolis	Representative	February 7, 1923	December 1, 1924	
Estonia	Jonas Aukštuolis	Envoy	December 1, 1924	June 1930 (?)	
Estonia	Kazimieras Šumauskas	Secretary, CDAI	June 1930	March 1931	
Estonia	Donatas Malinauskas	CDAI	March 16, 1931		
Estonia	Bronius Dailidė	Envoy	January 31, 1933	June 1940	Until the Soviet occupation of Lithuania
Finland	Vytautas Gylys	Representative	February 1, 1919	July 30, 1921	
Finland	Ignas Šeinius	CDAI	November 1921		
Finland	Jurgis Savickis	Representative	December 6, 1923	July 1, 1927	
Finland	Jonas Aukštuolis	Envoy	March 5, 1929	September 1, 1934	Resided in Kaunas and Prague
Finland	Bronius Dailidė	Envoy	October 5, 1934	1940	Until the Soviet occupation
France	Oskaras Milašius	CDAI	December 1, 1920	May 20, 1925	
France	Petras Klimas	Envoy	May 20, 1925	August 24, 1940	Until the German occupation of France
Germany	Jurgis Šaulys	Envoy	November 20, 1918	June 11, 1919	
Germany	Juozas Purickis	Envoy	June 12, 1919	June 18, 1920	
Germany	Viktoras Gailius	Envoy	May 19, 1920	May 31, 1922	
Germany	Vaclovas Sidzikauskas	CDAI	June 1, 1922	March 31, 1924	From 1923, representatives in Germany also covered Japan.
Germany	Vaclovas Sidzikauskas	Envoy	April 1, 1924	September 31, 1931	
Germany	Jurgis Šaulys	Envoy	October 1, 1931	December 14, 1938	
Germany	Kazys Škirpa	Envoy	December 14, 1938		Until his arrest by the Gestapo
Great Britain	Vincas Čepinskis	Representative	April 1919	1919	
Great Britain	Alfredas Tiškevičius	Representative	1919 fall	1921	Former secretary of the Russian embassy in London
Great Britain	Tomas Norus-Naruševičius		1921	June 29, 1923	From 1923, representatives in London also covered China.
Great Britain	Voldemaras Čarneckis	CDAI	December 5, 1923	July 11, 1924	
Great Britain	Ernestas Galvanauskas	Envoy	November 1924	June 1, 1928	
Great Britain	Kazys Bizauskas	Envoy	May 16, 1928	September 31, 1931	
Great Britain	Vaclovas Sidzikauskas	Envoy	October 1, 1931	January 1934	De facto succeeded by Juozas Kajeckas until the appointment of Balutis
Great Britain	Bronius Kazys Balutis	Envoy	June 1, 1934	December 30, 1967	Representation continued
Hungary	Vaclovas Sidzikauskas	CDAI	April 5, 1924	July 9, 1925	Resided in Berlin
Hungary	Vaclovas Sidzikauskas	Envoy	July 19, 1925	November 15, 1931	Resided in Berlin
Hungary	Jurgis Šaulys	Envoy	February 24, 1932	December 14, 1938	Resided in Berlin
Hungary	Kazys Škirpa	Envoy	December 14, 1938		Until occupation; Resided in Berlin
Iran (Persia)	Jurgis Baltrušaitis	Envoy	May 20, 1933	May 1939	Resided in Moscow, Russia
Italy	Jurgis Šaulys	CDAI	January 31, 1921	May 29, 1923	
Italy	Petras Klimas	Envoy	September 15, 1923	May 19, 1925	
Italy	Voldemaras Čarneckis	Envoy	November 7, 1925	February 14, 1939	
Italy	Stasys Lozoraitis	Envoy	February 15, 1939	August 1940	Until Soviet Union took over Villa Lituania
Latvia	Jonas Šliūpas	Representative	August 1919	December 1919	
Latvia	Dovas Zaunius	CDAI	February 8, 1920	November 10, 1921	
Latvia	Dovas Zaunius	Resident Minister	November 10, 1921	February 6, 1923	
Latvia	Jonas Aukštuolis	Representative	February 7, 1923	December 1, 1924	
Latvia	Jonas Aukštuolis	Envoy	December 1, 1924	August 31, 1927	
Latvia	Kazys Bizauskas	Envoy	September 1, 1927	May 15, 1928	
Latvia	Bronius Dailidė	Envoy	August 1, 1928	1933	
Latvia	Juozas Urbšys	Envoy	May 15, 1933	July 14, 1934	
Latvia	Vytautas Vileišis	Envoy	August 1, 1934	1937	
Latvia	Jurgis Savickis	Envoy	December 1937	November 30, 1938	
Latvia	Kazys Bizauskas	Envoy	January 1, 1939	May 1, 1939	
Latvia	Pranas Dailidė	Envoy	June 1, 1939	August 3, 1940	
League of Nations	Dovas Zaunius	Permanent Delegate	March 17, 1925	May 22, 1927	
League of Nations	Kazys Škirpa	Envoy and Permanent Delegate	July 1, 1937	December 1, 1938	
League of Nations	Jurgis Savickis	Envoy and Permanent Delegate	December 1, 1938	June 15, 1940	
League of Nations	Edvardas Turauskas		October 15, 1940	1946	Until the liquidation of the League of Nations
Luxembourg	Petras Klimas	Envoy	December 19, 1931	1940	Until the German occupation of Luxembourg; Resided in Paris
Netherlands	Jonas Aukštuolis	Representative	November 22, 1921	September 1, 1922	
Netherlands	Jurgis Savickis	CDAI	July 1923	February 1925	
Netherlands	Ernestas Galvanauskas		March 1925	1927	Resided in London
Netherlands	Kazys Bizauskas	Envoy	October 14, 1930	December 20, 1931	
Netherlands	Vaclovas Sidzikauskas	Envoy	December 21, 1931	May 31, 1934	Resided in London
Netherlands	Bronius Kazys Balutis	Envoy	June 1, 1934	1942	Until establishment of diplomatic relations with Soviet Union
Norway	Jonas Aukštuolis	Representative	July 29, 1919	February 16, 1922	Resided in Stockholm
Norway	Jurgis Savickis	CDAI	February 17, 1922	December 6, 1923	Resided in Copenhagen, Denmark
Norway	Ignas Šeinius	CDAI	December 6, 1923	1927	Resided in Stockholm
Norway	Jurgis Savickis	Envoy	January 1, 1930	February 1937	Resided in Stockholm
Norway	Vytautas Gylys	Envoy	June 1, 1938	1940	Until the Soviet occupation of Lithuania; Resided in Stockholm
Paraguay	Teodoras Daukantas	CDAI	January 9, 1931	September 1, 1934	Resided in Rio de Janeiro, Brazil
Poland	Kazys Škirpa	Envoy	March 26, 1938	December 14, 1938	Established after the 1938 Polish ultimatum to Lithuania
Poland	Jurgis Šaulys	Envoy	December 15, 1938	September 1939	Until the Invasion of Poland
Portugal	Petras Klimas	Envoy	March 20, 1930	September 1, 1940	Until Portugal suspended diplomatic relations with the Baltic states; Resided in Paris
Romania	Dovas Zaunius	Envoy	November 4, 1924	February 11, 1925	Resided in Prague
Romania	Edvardas Turauskas	Envoy	August 27, 1935		Until the Soviet occupation; Resided in Prague
Soviet Union	Juozas Simonaitis-Vanagas		1920		
Soviet Union	Jurgis Baltrušaitis	Chairman of the Special Lithuanian Mission	September 16, 1920	June 20, 1922	
Soviet Union	Jurgis Baltrušaitis	Envoy	June 21, 1922	March 31, 1939	
Soviet Union	Ladas Natkevičius	Envoy	June 1, 1939	September 16, 1940	Until the Soviet occupation of Lithuania
Spain	Petras Klimas	Envoy	February 28, 1930		Until the end of the Spanish Civil War; Resided in Paris
Sweden	Jonas Aukštuolis	Representative	January 12, 1919	February 16, 1922	
Sweden	Jurgis Savickis	CDAI	February 17, 1922	December 6, 1923	Resided in Copenhagen, Denmark
Sweden	Ignas Šeinius	CDAI	January 1, 1924	June 30, 1927	
Sweden	Bronius Dailidė	Envoy	March 1929	January 1930	Resided in Riga, Latvia
Sweden	Jurgis Savickis	Envoy	January 1930	November 1937	
Sweden	Vytautas Gylys		December 1937	August 25, 1940	Until the Soviet occupation of Lithuania
Switzerland	Vladas Daumantas	Unofficial representative	December 27, 1918	1919	
Switzerland	Jurgis Šaulys	Representative	September 1, 1919	December 1, 1919	
Switzerland	Vaclovas Sidzikauskas	Representative	December 6, 1919	November 3, 1921	
Switzerland	Vaclovas Sidzikauskas	CDAI	November 4, 1921	May 31, 1922	
Switzerland	Edvardas Turauskas	CDAI	June 1, 1922	August 15, 1923	
Switzerland	Dovas Zaunius	Envoy	February 12, 1925	June 10, 1927	
Switzerland	Vaclovas Sidzikauskas	Envoy	June 1, 1927	November 19, 1934	Resided in Berlin
Switzerland	Jurgis Šaulys	Envoy	November 19, 1934	December 14, 1938	Resided in Berlin
Switzerland	Kazys Škirpa	Envoy	December 15, 1938	December 1, 1939	Resided in Berlin
Switzerland	Jurgis Šaulys		December 1, 1939	November 1, 1946	
Turkey	Jurgis Baltrušaitis	Envoy	May 20, 1932	May 1, 1939	Resided in Moscow
Ukraine	Andrius Lisauskas	Representative	October 24, 1919	1920	In Odessa
United States	Jonas Vileišis	Chairman of the Lithuanian Mission	December 1919	June 15, 1921	Recognized by the State Department as an unofficial representative
United States	Voldemaras Čarneckis	Representative	June 15, 1921	September 7, 1921	In Washington D.C.
United States	Voldemaras Čarneckis	CDAI	September 8, 1921	November 23, 1923	
United States	Kazys Bizauskas	Representative	November 24, 1923	June 3, 1924	
United States	Kazys Bizauskas	Envoy	June 4, 1924	August 31, 1927	
United States	Bronius Kazys Balutis	Envoy	July 1, 1928	May 31, 1934	
United States	Mikas Bagdonas	CDAI	May 17, 1927	June 1928	
United States	Mikas Bagdonas	CDAI	May 31, 1934	June 30, 1935	
United States	Povilas Žadeikis	Envoy	July 1, 1935	May 11, 1957	Until his death; Representation continued
Uruguay	Teodoras Daukantas	CDAI	January 9, 1931	1934	Resided in Rio de Janeiro, Brazil
Uruguay	Jonas Aukštuolis	Envoy	November 1, 1934	March 7, 1940	
Uruguay	Kazimieras Graužinis		March 8, 1940		
Vatican	Jurgis Narjauskas	Episcopal Representative	September 17, 1919	March 30, 1922	
Vatican	Kazys Bizauskas	Representative	March 30, 1922	November 23, 1923	
Vatican	Juozas Macevičius	CDAI	1924 end	May 18, 1926	
Vatican	Jurgis Šaulys	Envoy	May 5, 1927	May 5, 1931	
Vatican	Stasys Lozoraitis	CDAI	September 1, 1931	August 31, 1932	
Vatican	Kazimieras Graužinis	CDAI	September 1, 1932	September 1, 1939	
Vatican	Stasys Girdvainis	Envoy	September 1, 1939	December 1, 1958	Demoted to CDAI, continued to represent Lithuania until 1970
Yugoslavia	Edvardas Turauskas	Envoy	November 15, 1935		Until the occupation; Resided in Prague
