= Jurgis Savickis =

Lithuanian writer (1890–1952)

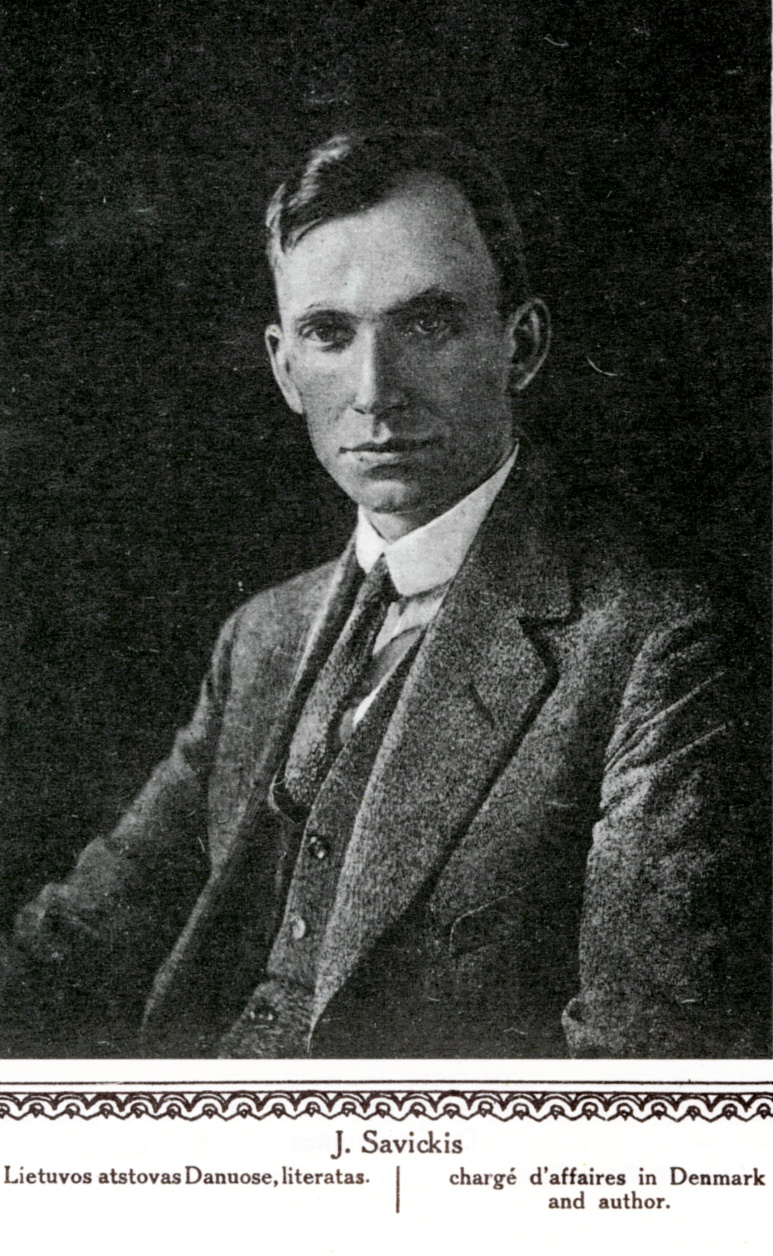
- Savickis in Lithuanian Album (1921)
- Born: 4 May 1890; Pagausantys, Kovno Governorate, Russian Empire
- Died: 22 December 1952 (aged 62); Roquebrune-Cap-Martin, France
- Other name: J. Rimošius (pen name)
- Education: School of Fine Arts in Kraków
- Occupations: Writer, diplomat
- Notable work: Šventadienio sonetai (1922); Raudoni batukai (1951)
- Movement: Literary modernism
- Children: Algirdas Savickis, Augustinas Savickas

Jurgis Savickis (4 May 1890 – 22 December 1952) was a Lithuanian short story writer and diplomat representing interwar Lithuania mostly in the Scandinavian countries.

Born to a family of well-off Lithuanian farmers, Savickis attended a gymnasium in Moscow and studied painting at the School of Fine Arts in Kraków. During World War I, he was sent as a delegate of the Lithuanian Society for the Relief of War Sufferers to Denmark to care for Lithuanian POWs in Germany. After the war, he was recognized as the official Lithuanian representative in Denmark and later in Norway and Sweden. In 1923–1927, he was posted in Finland. In 1927–1929, he worked in Kaunas as the director of the Law and Administration Department of the Ministry of Foreign Affairs and as director of the Kaunas State Drama Theatre. He returned to the diplomatic service and represented Lithuania in Sweden (1930–1937), Latvia (1937–1938), and the League of Nations (1938–1940). After the Soviet occupation of Lithuania in June 1940, Savickis retired in his villa in Roquebrune-Cap-Martin near Monaco in the South of France.

During his life, Savickis published three collections of short stories, one novel, and four travel books. He was one of the first to introduce literary modernism (with elements of Expressionism, Impressionism, and Existentialism, though his works don't neatly fit any particular literary movement) to Lithuanian literature. As his works departed literary realism, they were not well received by contemporary critics who thought his works were too foreign and too removed from Lithuanian realities. Savickis, having lived abroad for most of his life, reflected aesthetics of modern Western European bourgeois. His works feature sharp and playful wit and irony and succinct and finely tuned sentences. His works were influenced by his interest in painting (abundance of colors, character sketches), theatre (characters as actors, stage setting), and film (dynamic montage of fragments). His narrator is an observer from a certain emotional distance that leaves it up to the reader to finish what is not said.

== Biography ==
=== Early life and education ===
Savickis was born on 4 May [O.S. 22 April] 1890 in the Pagausantys village near Ariogala to a family of well-off Lithuanian farmers who owned about 80 hectares (200 acres) of land. His paternal grandmother was of Lithuanian nobility stock and the family took pride in this heritage, on occasion referring to their farm as a manor. Savickis was the oldest of twelve children, but only five of them reached adulthood.

There is no information available on his childhood, but researchers believe that he received education in Ariogala and Kaunas. In 1902, his uncle took him to Moscow where he attended the 6th Gymnasium. He was not a great student and received "satisfactory" grades in most of his classes. In fall 1911, he continued his studies at the higher agrarian courses in Saint Petersburg (predecessor of the Saint Petersburg State Agrarian University), but dropped out after a few months and returned to Moscow to study art. His family disapproved this decision and ceased providing financial support to Savickis. From November 1913 to summer 1914, Savickis attended the School of Fine Arts in Kraków. His studies were interrupted by the outbreak of World War I.

=== Scandinavia ===
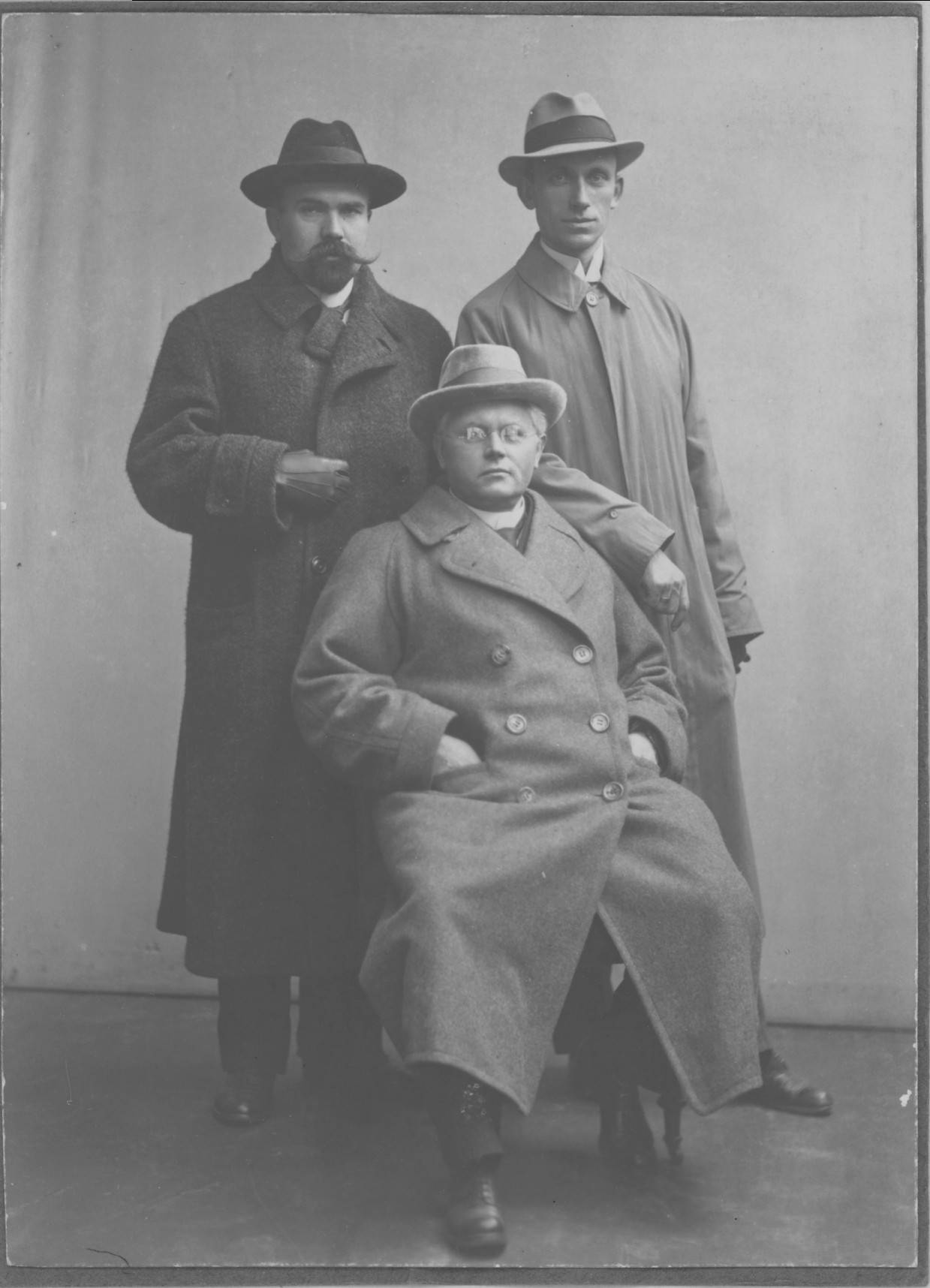
Martynas Yčas (left), Juozas Tumas-Vaižgantas (sitting), and Savickis in Stockholm in 1918

He returned to his native Pagausantys. In fall 1915, he evacuated to Saint Petersburg and joined the Lithuanian Society for the Relief of War Sufferers which sent him as a representative to Copenhagen, Denmark, a neutral country. Savickis was tasked with working with the Red Cross to organize the relief efforts for Lithuanian POWs in Germany. He also promoted the Lithuanian cause for independence by writing articles for the Danish press and publishing books and postcards. In early 1917, he assisted with organizing the Lithuanian Day, a worldwide collection of donations for the benefit of Lithuanian war refugees. In October 1917, he attended the Lithuanian conference in Stockholm, which recognized the Council of Lithuania as the legitimate representative of the Lithuanian nation and reiterated Lithuania's desire for full independence.

On 1 January 1919, the newly established Ministry of Foreign Affairs recognized Savickis as the official representative of Lithuania to Denmark. Lithuania suffered severe financial difficulties and allotted very limited funds for its representatives abroad. Therefore, Savickis incurred personal debts and could not organize more active representation. In turn, the Ministry complained of Savickis' lax bookkeeping practices. In January 1922, he was officially recognized as chargés d'affaires ad interim in Denmark and a month later in Norway and Sweden. In December 1923, the legation was closed due to financial difficulties and Savickis was reassigned to Helsinki, Finland.

=== Interwar Lithuania ===
After the coup d'état in December 1926, the new Minister of Foreign Affairs, Augustinas Voldemaras, concentrated his attention on the main powers in Europe and paid a lot less interest to the Scandinavian countries and the legation in Finland was closed on 1 July 1927. The decision was hastened by a local scandal when Savickis was criticized by a local metal workers' union and he vowed to pursue legal action against them.

Savickis was reassigned to Kaunas to become director of the Law and Administration Department of the Ministry in September 1927. At the same time, he was appointed as director of the troubled Kaunas State Drama Theatre. Savickis was not particularly interested in running the theatre and was a hands-off manager. Nevertheless, he managed to improve its financial condition, recruit talented actors, and stage Šarūnas by Vincas Krėvė-Mickevičius.

=== Diplomatic corps ===
In September 1929, Minister Voldemaras was ousted by President Antanas Smetona and Savickis was again offered a diplomatic position abroad. He accepted a position in the reestablished Lithuanian legation in Stockholm. On 1 January 1930, he became Envoy Extraordinary and Minister Plenipotentiary to Sweden, Norway, and Denmark. The Scandinavian countries showed little interest in Lithuanian politics or economy and Savickis concentrated on cultural exchanges. He prepared and publish an album of Lithuanian art in Swedish (1931) and French (1934) as well as a collection of Lithuanian short stories in Swedish (1940). He traveled across Europe via car and visited northern Africa; he published three travel books.

In 1935, he started the construction of a villa, which he named after Ariogala, in Roquebrune-Cap-Martin, located next to Monaco in the South of France. At the end of 1937, he was reassigned to Riga, Latvia, where he served for a little less than a year before moving to Geneva, Switzerland, to work as the Lithuanian representative to the League of Nations. During his tenure, German ultimatum forced Lithuania to give up the Klaipėda Region (Memelland) in March 1939. At the end of 1939, two Lithuanian legations in Geneva and Bern were consolidated, leaving Jurgis Šaulys in Switzerland and moving Savickis to Kaunas. He was offered a position in the Propaganda Department, but he refused.

=== Soviet occupation ===
At the time of the Soviet occupation of Lithuania in June 1940, Savickis was resting in his villa in Roquebrune-Cap-Martin. He did not join the Lithuanian Diplomatic Service which continued to represent independent Lithuania, but he was visited by Lithuanian diplomats, including Petras Klimas, Edvardas Turauskas, Stasys Antanas Bačkis, as well as writer Jonas Aistis. He earned a living from his farm and devoted time to writing. He decorated his villa with works of Lithuanian artists. Not being a very practical farmer, he struggled financially.

He died in December 1952 and was buried in the local cemetery. His remains were later relocated to the more central and prestigious part of the cemetery by the Lithuanian Writers' Society of the United States. The villa was sold by the government and later demolished.

== Works ==
=== Published works ===
His first work of fiction was published in Lietuvos žinios in 1910. It was a lyrical short story Dienos kančios (Day's Suffering) describing loneliness when a loved one chose to be with a wealthier man. Until 1914, he also published works in Aušrinė and Laisvoji mintis. These early works were similar to the earlier Lithuanian literature – realist stories of social inequality, injustice, life's sufferings.

During his lifetime, Savickis published three collections of short stories: Šventadienio sonetai (The Sonnets of Holy Days, 1922), Ties aukštu sostu (By the High Throne, 1928), and Raudoni batukai (The Red Shoes, 1951). Šventadienio sonetai was one of the first modernist (Expressionist) works in Lithuanian literature that treated fiction as pure art instead of a semi-ethnographic treatise or a tool to promote some noble cause. It received negative reviews from Adomas Jakštas and Vytautas Bičiūnas, reserved comments from Vincas Mykolaitis-Putinas and Kostas Korsakas, and praise from Balys Sruoga. Leonas Miškinas surmised that Šventadienio sonetai was published a decade earlier than Lithuanian readers were ready. The second collection, published after the modernist literary magazine Keturi vėjai, received more positive reviews, but was still criticized for being too urban and too detached from Lithuanian realities. The last collection received critical acclaim. It features works with simpler form and style, but with depth and human warmth as well as nostalgia for Lithuania and hedonism.

In 1952, he published his only novel, Šventoji Lietuva (Holy Lithuania), about Lithuania after the failed Russian Revolution of 1905. It is a satirical work verging on a grotesque – a contrast to Lithuania depicted as unnaturally ideal or holy by other nostalgic Lithuanian authors. Critics regarded it as the weakest work of Savickis, more a draft than a complete work. His war-time diary Žemė dega (Earth on Fire) was published posthumously in 1956. It is more similar to works of fiction than a diary: it observes the chaos and destruction of war, but focuses on everyday life and the farm where nature brings back harmony and stability. He also published four travel books: En rejse gennem Litauen (A Journey Through Lithuania, 1919, in Danish, with foreword by Georg Brandes), Atostogos (Vacations, 1928), Truputis Afrikos (A Little bit of Africa, 1934), and Kelionės (Travels, 1938). These are not typical travel books that describe nature or events. Instead, Savickis described various fragments and details of impressions, psychological nuances, curious situations. Therefore, Savickis not as much describes his destinations as creates them. In En rejse gennem Litauen, Savickis expressively renders Lithuanian cultural landscape and sketches the Lithuanian national identity.

Svickis did not leave an autobiography – he started it, but decided it was too egocentric and destroyed it. He also started other works, including a collection of stories Sapnas (Dream) and a novel Šarlatanas (Charlatan), but the manuscripts were lost after his death. His collected works were published in six volumes in 1990–1999 in Vilnius.

=== Style and features ===
Savickis was a cosmopolitan person with an aristocratic disposition. He enjoyed moving around and a luxurious lifestyle, but would not become attached to property. He was known for some large impulsive and impractical purchases, including plots of land and houses in Kulautuva and Palanga. He was a poor orator and disliked ceremonies and public events, but could start a warm and sincere conversation with a poor farmer or a foreign dignitary equally well. In general, Savickis avoided joining organizations or societies and never belonged to any political party. He was not governed by stereotypes and exhibited inner freedom and intelligence. He developed his artistic taste in Western Europe among wealthy bourgeois. Such traits were also reflected in his works which made them difficult to understand and foreign to a more narrow-minded Lithuanian reader. Lithuanians were more used to sentimental, moralized, or patriotic literature while Savickis' works do not neatly fit into any literary movement.

Savickis developed a unique personal style. His works often feature sharp and playful wit and irony, elegant and light writing, succinct and finely tuned sentences (he disliked verbose writers and chatty people). He used many international words and references to other works and employed symbols, metaphors, contrasts. His works were also influenced by his interest in art and theater: plenty of colors, interplay between light and darkness, contours and sketches instead of detailed pictures, purposefully constructed sets and locations (nature is more a prop than something to be worshiped and admired), characters as actors in a play. His works feature a series of fragments creating a dynamic, film-like montage.

Most of Savickis' works take place in cities outside of Lithuania. In a few works that are set in rural Lithuania, the main character is an outsider – such a visiting city dweller, an artist, or aristocrat. His characters, conflicted and struggling with their passions, often seem like dolls played by the unpredictable and capricious life and fate. They are often incomplete sketches of symbolic figures, wearing masks and living in their own world of feelings and emotions. They are small people blind to the enormity of life passing by. Many characters openly display sexual desires breaking another taboo in Lithuanian literature. The plot usually revolves around unexpected promising meetings, painful separations, or failure of grand ideas, intentions, and intrigues. Irony, prevalent in Savickis' works, is used to contrast moral and existential, banal and mystical. His narrator is an observer who maintains a certain emotional distance and does not pass judgement, not an omniscient moralizing narrator typical of literary realism. This distance is alluded to in the title of Ties aukštu sostu (By the High Throne). Savickis leaves it to up the reader to finish the character sketches, to complete what is not said. His works are ambiguous, open to interpretations, not governed by traditional moral values. His works are not self-explanatory lectures, but riddles requiring active involvement from the reader.

== Persona life ==
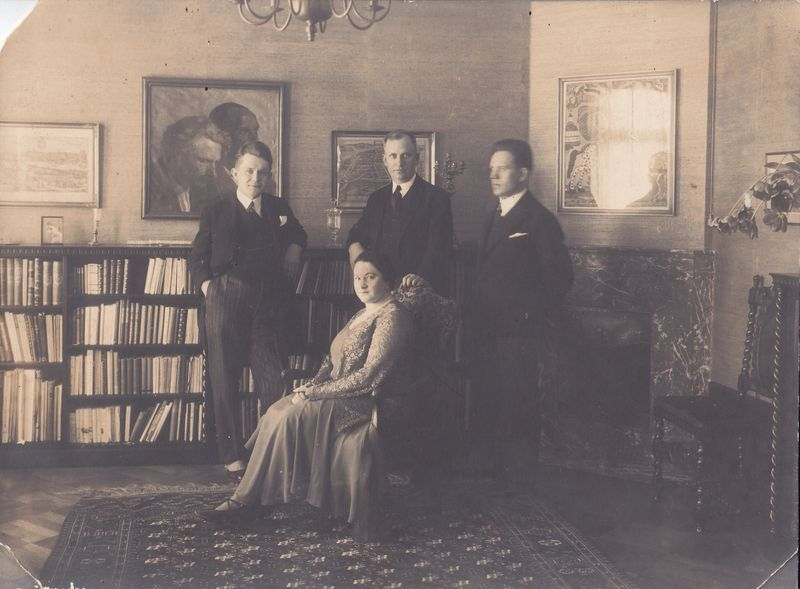
Valentinas Gustainis (left) visits Savickis (middle) in Stockholm around 1932. Savickis' wife, Ida Trakiner, sits in front.

Savickis was married twice. In 1916, Savickis married Ida Trakiner, a dentist, daughter of a wealthy Jewish factory owner in Saint Petersburg. They had two sons, Algirdas and Augustinas. Their marriage was not happy and after a prolonged process they finally divorced in 1935 or 1936. Both sons were interested in painting and attended art schools. During World War II, Algirdas voluntarily entered the Kaunas Ghetto to be with his Jewish wife and was shot in 1943. Ida Trakiner was hiding with Savickis' brother, but hung herself. Augustinas sympathized with communists and retreated into Russia. He returned to Lithuania with the 50th (Lithuanian) Reserve Rifle Division and became a well known painter, awarded the Lithuanian National Prize for Culture and Arts in 1999.

Savickis married Inge Geisler, a Danish woman who worked as his secretary, in December 1936. They adopted an Italian boy, but separated in 1948. They were not officially divorced and Savickis lived the last year of his live with Mary Albine Koh (or Maria Kock), a Dutch woman who burned Savickis' archives and manuscripts after his death. She claimed that it was done according to the last wishes of Savickis.

== See also ==
- List of Lithuanian diplomats (1918–1940)
