= Jonas Aukštuolis =

Lithuanian diplomat

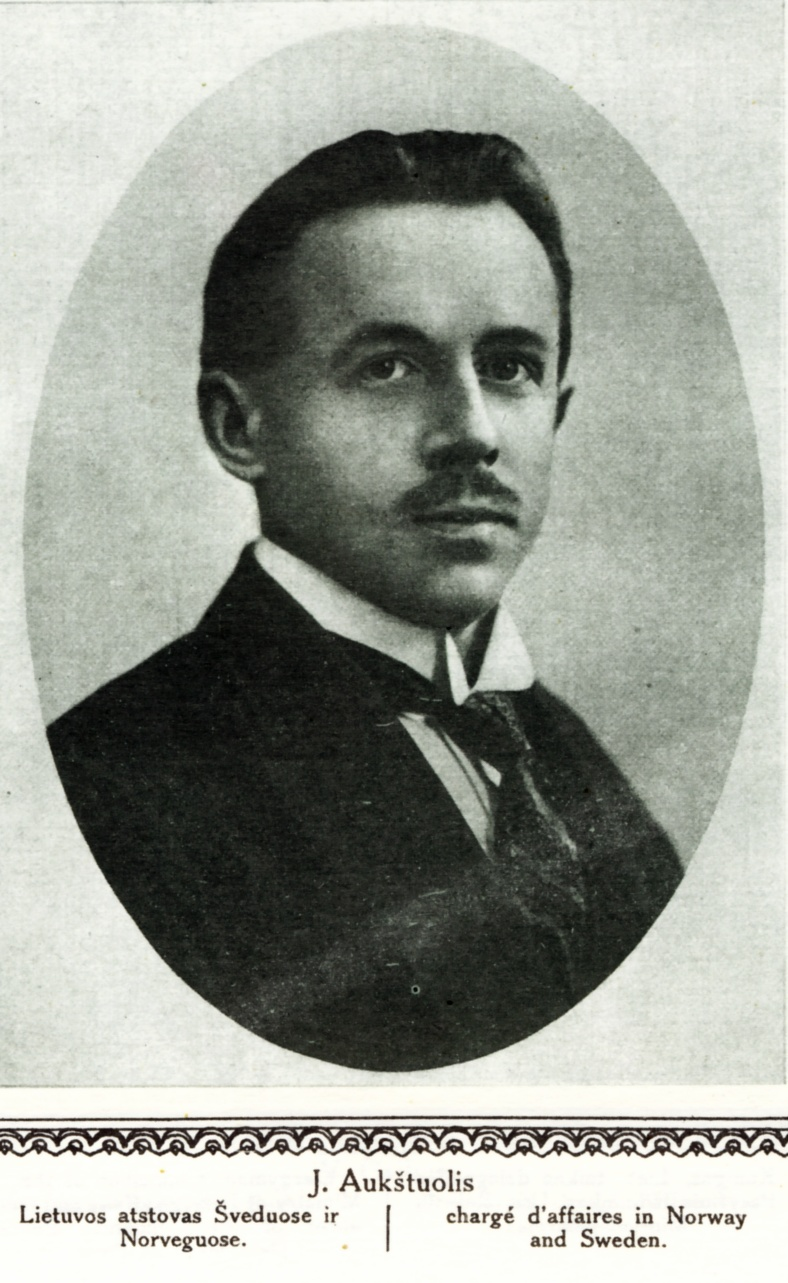
- Portrait of Aukštuolis in Album of Lithuania published in 1921
- Born: 1 February 1885; Kalnagaliai, Russian Empire
- Died: 28 October 1949 (aged 64); Dubravlag, Soviet Union
- Education: Saint Petersburg University; Tomsk University
- Occupation: Diplomat

Jonas Aukštuolis (1 February 1885 – 28 October 1949) was a Lithuanian diplomat. During World War I, he worked for the Lithuanian Society for the Relief of War Sufferers and was sent to Stockholm to organize contacts with German-occupied Lithuania. He was the Lithuanian representative in Sweden and Norway (1919–1922), Netherlands (1921–1922), Latvia (1923–1927), Estonia (1923–1930), Finland (1929–1934), Czechoslovakia (1932–1934), Argentina, Uruguay, and Brazil (1934–1939). In 1939, he was recalled to Kaunas and was deported by the Soviets to a Gulag camp in June 1941. He died in one of the camps in Mordovia.

== Early life and education ==
Aukštuolis was born on 1 February [O.S. 20 January] 1885 in Kalnagaliai village near Alizava, Kovno Governorate, Russian Empire, to a family of well-off farmers that belonged to the Lithuanian Evangelical Reformed Church. He only had one sister and as the only son was set to inherit the farm, but his parents sent him to get education. After completing primary schools in Virbališkiai and Kupiškis, he enrolled into the Mitau Gymnasium in 1899. After the graduation in 1907, he continued his studies at the law Faculty of the Saint Petersburg University. After three years, he was expelled for participation in a student strike and other Menshevik activities. Invited by his cousin Martynas Yčas, Aukštuolis finished his studies at the Tomsk University.

== World War I ==
In spring 1912, Aukštuolis returned to Lithuania and settled in Kaunas and got a job with the Kaunas District Court. He also helped Yčas with his election campaign to the Russian State Duma. In 1915, during World War I, Aukštuolis together with other court officials was evacuated to Moscow. There he joined the Lithuanian Society for the Relief of War Sufferers and visited various Russian cities, particularly Penza, Voronezh, Samara, organizing the relief to Lithuanian war refugees.

However, contact with Lithuania was lost since it was occupied by German forces. It was possible to reestablish the contact via neutral Sweden and Aukštuolis was sent to the first Lithuanian conference in Stockholm and appointed manager of the Swedish–Lithuanian Aid Committee, chaired by Carl Lindhagen, mayor of Stockholm. Neutral Scandinavian countries became a bridge that allowed communication, including sending letters and parcels, and financial support to the occupied Lithuania. Lithuanians published articles in Scandinavian press explaining and promoting the Lithuanian goals of independence. In 1917, Aukštuolis helped organize the Lithuanian Day, a worldwide collection of donations for the benefit of Lithuanian refugees.

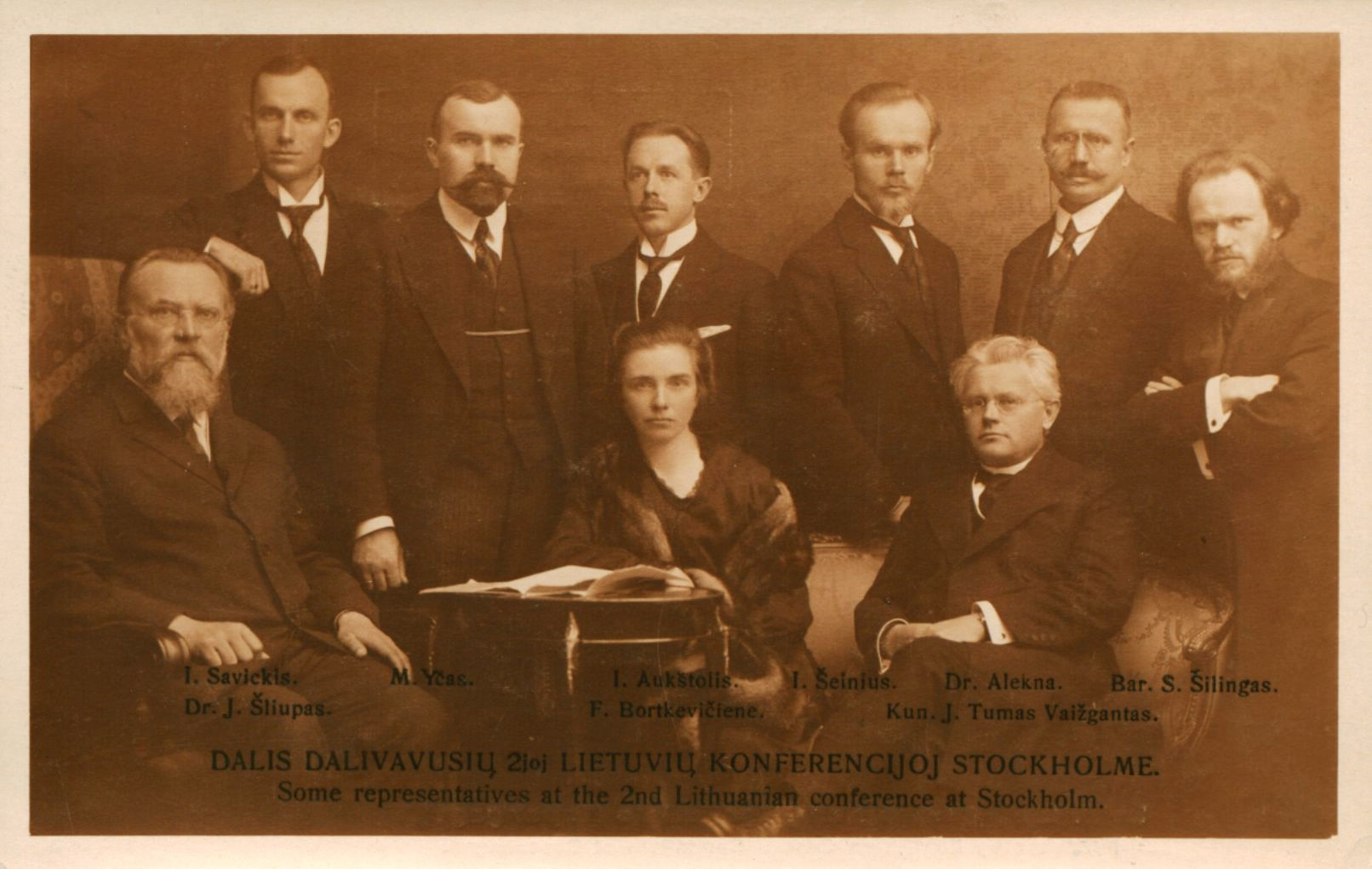
Aukštuolis (standing third from left) at the Stockholm conference in 1917

== Diplomat ==
Lithuania declared independence in February 1918 and Sweden recognized Lithuania de facto on 12 January 1919. On the same day, Aukštuolis was appointed as the first Lithuanian representative to Sweden. In July 1919, he was also appointed as the representative to Norway. At the time, the primary task of Lithuanian diplomats was to obtain de jure recognition of Lithuania's independence and support for Lithuania's membership in the League of Nations. In February 1922, due to financial difficulties, the legation in Sweden was closed and Aukštuolis was recalled to Kaunas where we worked as the director of the Law and Administration Department of the Ministry of Foreign Affairs.

After a year, in February 1923, he was sent to Riga as the Lithuanian representative to Latvia and Estonia. There he met and married a daughter of a wealthy Latvian factory owner; they had no children. He was appointed as the envoy to Finland in March 1929 but was recalled to Kaunas in February 1930 and appointed as acting director of the Law and Administration Department (officially, he continued to represent Lithuania in Finland). Due to vacancies, it was the second position under minister Dovas Zaunius but Aukštuolis was not well regarded and did not leave a more prominent impact before his appointment to Czechoslovakia in October 1931. In Prague, Aukšuolis negotiated annual agreements for the export of Lithuanian butter, bacon, and eggs. In September 1934, Minister Stasys Lozoraitis appointed him to Argentina and Aukštuolis lived for five years in Buenos Aires. He also covered Brazil and Uruguay. In 1939, he was recalled to Kaunas and appointed as chief of diplomatic protocol.

== Gulag prisoner ==
When Lithuania was occupied by the Soviet Union in June 1940, Aukštuolis along other dignitaries greeted Vladimir Dekanozov, deputy of Vyacheslav Molotov, at the Kaunas Airport. He remained in Lithuania though his wife fled to Argentina and he used his diplomatic contacts to help Martynas Yčas escape to Berlin. After the Soviet takeover, Aukštuolis lost his job at the ministry but with a recommendation from Justas Paleckis (they worked together at the Lithuanian legation in Riga) obtained a job teaching Russian language at the Secondary School No. 1 in Panevėžys.

He was one of the 17,500 Lithuanians deported to Siberia during the June deportation in 1941. Together with several other prominent Lithuanians, including former president Aleksandras Stulginskis and minister Stasys Šilingas, Aukštuolis ended up in Kraslag in the Krasnoyarsk Krai. In 1942, he and 16 other Lithuanians were once again arrested and accused of anti-Soviet activities. The NKVD recommended a death sentence, but the final sentence of 25 years in prison was announced only in February 1952 – almost three years after Aukštuolis death from tuberculosis and malnutrition in Dubravlag.
