= Lithuanian Day =

Fundraising event on 20 May 1917

The Lithuanian Day was a worldwide collection of donations in Roman Catholic churches for the benefit of Lithuanian World War I refugees on 20 May 1917.

The idea of a donation drive for Lithuanian refugees was first raised by Juozas Gabrys in 1915. Martynas Yčas, Vincas Bartuška, and Konstantinas Olšauskas obtained separate audiences with Pope Benedict XV and requested his approval for the Lithuanian Day. The Holy See delayed because Lithuania was considered a province of Poland, but the papal approval was eventually granted on 10 February 1917. Olšauskas then organized a Lithuanian committee in Lausanne, Switzerland, which distributed the appeal in the name of bishop Pranciškus Būčys. The committee faced various difficulties, including restrictions by the Allies of World War I to send money to enemy-occupied territories and lack of awareness about Lithuania.

The committee did not produce an accounting report, therefore the total collected sum is unknown but was estimated at 1 million litas. It was not a large sum, but Lithuanian activists valued the Lithuanian Day as an opportunity to spread awareness about Lithuania, particularly because this donation drive was held solely for Lithuania and not in combination with Poland.

== Background ==
Germany occupied most of Lithuania during the Great Retreat in summer 1915. This effectively cut off funds from the Russian Empire and Lithuanian Americans for aid to war refugees. Lithuanian activists searched for ways to increase aid to Lithuania and looked to the Holy See as similar donation drives were held for Poland, Belgium, and Armenia.

In addition to financial gain, Lithuanians hoped to spread awareness about Lithuania (key message being that it was distinct from Poland). As an added benefit, it would boost church's reputation in Lithuania. At the same time, Lithuanian activists attempted to keep the fundraising effort apolitical and avoided advertising Lithuania's desire for independence.

== Early attempts ==
The issue of fundraising for Lithuanian benefit in churches was raised by Juozas Gabrys in April 1915 when he petitioned Eugenio Pacelli and Pope Benedict XV. The issue was revisited by Gabrys in April 1916 during the Lithuanian conference in Bern. This time, he received a vague promise to help from Pacelli. At the same time, a separate request was sent by Antanas Viskantas.

In June 1916, a delegation of the Russian State Duma arrived to Rome. Its member Martynas Yčas, who was also the chairman of the Lithuanian Society for the Relief of War Sufferers, used the opportunity to again raise the issue of the Lithuanian Day. Though he was an Reformed Christian, he gained an audience with the pope and cardinal Mario Pio Gaspari on 11 or 12 June 1916. On 15 June, Lithuanian press reported that the pope donated 10,000 Italian liras for Lithuanian refugees.

== Papal approval ==
The Lithuanian American Roman Catholic Federation delegated priest Vincas Bartuška to investigate the situation in Lithuania and push for the Lithuanian Day. In Lithuania, he obtained a letter signed by priests from Kaunas and board members of the Lithuanian Society for the Relief of War Sufferers. Via Kazimieras Prapuolenis and Russian diplomat Nicholas Bock, Bartuška gained an audience with the pope on 17 July 1916. This time, the pope indicated that fundraising for Lithuanian refugees had been already covered by a collection for Poland held on 21 November 1915. Bartuška then argued that Lithuanians were distinct from Poles and that the reputation of the Catholic Church would be tarnished in Lithuania if it did not receive help while aid was provided from the Eastern Orthodox Russia.

The pope agreed to announce the Lithuanian Day, but requested a joint letter from Lithuanian bishops as similar letters were sent by Polish, Irish, and Belgian bishops. There were three Lithuanian bishops: Antanas Karosas of Sejny, Pranciškus Karevičius of Samogitia, and Kazimierz Mikołaj Michalkiewicz of Vilnius. Karosas and Karevičius had retreated to Russia from Lithuania and were hard to reach, while Michalkiewicz harbored anti-Lithuanian attitudes. Therefore, a joint bishop letter could not be produced.

In August 1916, Yčas and the Lithuanian Society for the Relief of War Sufferers sent Pranciškus Būčys to Rome to advocate for the Lithuanian Day. However, he did not have the requested bishop letter and could not make progress in the Roman Curia. He departed to the United States a month later. In September 1916, Lithuanians delegated Konstantinas Olšauskas. Olšauskas arrived to Rome in January 1917 and obtained an audience with the pope. He explained that "if, due to unknown reasons, the bishops are not sending the requested letter, the starving Lithuanian nation is not at fault." He also argued that the pope already had letters from Karevičius presented by Yčas and from Matas Dabrila (administrator of the Diocese of Sejny) presented by Bartuška, while Michalkiewicz did not consider himself a Lithuanian.

On 10 February 1917, the pope relented and sent a letter to Karevičius authorizing Lithuanian bishops to appeal to all bishops and collect donations on 20 May 1917 (Ascension Sunday). The pope personally donated 20,000 liras.

== Preparations ==
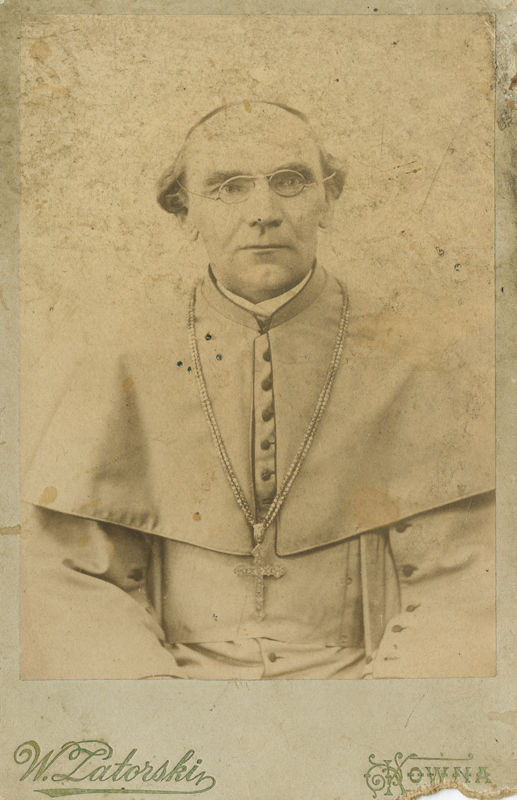
The appeal was distributed in the name of bishop Pranciškus Karevičius (pictured in 1914) without his consent

With the papal permission in hand, Olšauskas departed to Lausanne, Switzerland. On 28 February 1917, he registered a committee to organize the Lithuanian Day. The committee included chairman Olšauskas, vice-chairman Vincas Bartuška, secretary Juozas Purickis, treasurer Vladas Daumantas, and members Antanas Steponaitis and Juozas Gabrys.

The committee prepared, translated into several languages (English, German, French, Spanish, Portuguese, Dutch, Hungarian, Czech, Lithuanian, Polish, Swedish), and distributed the appeal to be read in churches. They were assisted by the Lithuanian Information Bureau headed by Juozas Gabrys. A total of about 20 people worked on organizing the Lithuanian Day. The territories were assigned as follows: United States to the Lithuanian National Foundation, Russia, Spain, and China to the Lithuanian Society for the Relief of War Sufferers, England to priest Kazimieras Jurgis Matulaitis, Scotland and Ireland to priests Antanas Šveistrys and Juozas Norbutas, Scandinavia to Jonas Aukštuolis, and Denmark to Jurgis Savickis. Appeals to German-occupied areas were sent via the Spanish diplomatic mission in Bern, while Germany, Austria, Italy, Balkans, and Holland were petitioned directly by the committee. Letters were also sent to Asia, Australia, and Oceania.

The committee could not get the signature of bishop Pranciškus Karevičius on the appeal. The appeal in his name was distributed on 19 March 1917 without his consent. In June 1917 (already after the Lithuanian Day), Karevičius sent a protest letter and demanded to distribute a new appeal written by him; Swiss Lithuanians believed that he was coerced into sending this letter by German authorities. The committee also faced other difficulties, including lack of awareness about Lithuania. Priest Norbutas traveled across Ireland and wrote that his appeals quickly turned into geography lessons. Turkey blocked mailed appeals (they were returned undelivered a few years later). Letters to Italy got stuck in Rome and were discovered after the Lithuanian Day; therefore, the committee resent revised appeals to hold the donation drive on another day.

To further support the effort, committee members traveled to assigned countries: Olšauskas to Spain, Purickis to France, Steponaitis to Germany; Bartuška (United Kingdom) and Daumantas (Italy) were refused entry visas. Olšauskas went to Spain and Portugal to meet with the Archbishops of Toledo and Lisbon. In France, he received a cold welcome from the French cardinal Léon-Adolphe Amette. President Raymond Poincaré promised to organize the collection via the Red Cross but it appears the effort was not successful. Olšauskas wanted to establish a French–Lithuanian Society and invited writers René Bazin and Étienne Lamy among others, but they refused. France was allied with Poland, and many of the French activists accused Lithuanians of separatism. Olšauskas received help from poet Fernand Mazade in publishing the appeal and other articles about Lithuania in the French press. Steponaitis was well received in Germany and was assisted by the Federal Foreign Office and nearly all bishops.

== Results ==
Lithuanian was occupied by Germany and there were various restrictions on sending money to enemy-occupied territories. Thus, for example, money collected in the United States (about $130,000 – equivalent to $3,267,000 in 2025) and United Kingdom were stuck. Money collected in Germany and Austria-Hungary were sent directly to bishop Karevičius instead of being routed via Switzerland. Cardinal Felix von Hartmann wrote that about 500,000 German marks were collected in German churches. Karevičius reported that he received about 190,000 marks from Italy and the United States. Swiss Lithuanians collected about 467,000 Swiss francs. Treasurer Vladas Daumantas did not produce a report on the collected funds and thus the total amount is not known, but was estimated at 1 million litas by Juozas Purickis.

The funds were used to finance refugee return to Lithuania, various Lithuanian organizations in Lithuania and Russia, schools, shelters, etc. The sums were relatively small, but Lithuanian activists value the Lithuanian Day for its impact in spreading awareness about Lithuania and, indirectly, about its desire for independence. They interpreted papal approval as the first recognition by the Holy See that Lithuania was distinct from Poland and had the same rights to their own national state. The Lithuanian Day also increased cooperation between various Lithuanian organizations.

== Bibliography ==
- Aničas, Jonas (2007). Jonas ir Martynas Yčai: Gyvenimas ir darbai Lietuvai (in Lithuanian). Vaga. ISBN 978-5-415-01484-2.
- Chwalba, Andrzej (2021). The People of Poland at War: 1914–1918. Peter Lang. ISBN 978-3-631-84599-8.
- Liulevičius, Vincentas (1981). Išeivijos vaidmuo nepriklausomos Lietuvos atkūrimo darbe (in Lithuanian). Chicago: Lithuanian World Community. OCLC 10779045.
- Misiūnas, Remigijus (2004). Informacinių kovų kryžkelėse: JAV lietuvių informacinės kovos XIX a. pabaigoje – 1922 m. (in Lithuanian). Vilnius: Versus Aurius. ISBN 9955-601-39-6.
- Pukienė, Vida (2013). Prelatas Konstantinas Olšauskas: visuomenės veikėjo tragedija (PDF). Edukologija. ISBN 978-9955-20-884-6. Archived from the original (PDF) on 2018-08-11.
- Skirius, Juozas (1994). "Bažnytinės lietuvių dienos svarba Lietuvai (1916–1918)". Lietuvių Atgimimo istorijos studijos (in Lithuanian). 7. ISSN 1392-0391.
