= Mafalda Salvatini =

Italian opera singer (1886–1971)

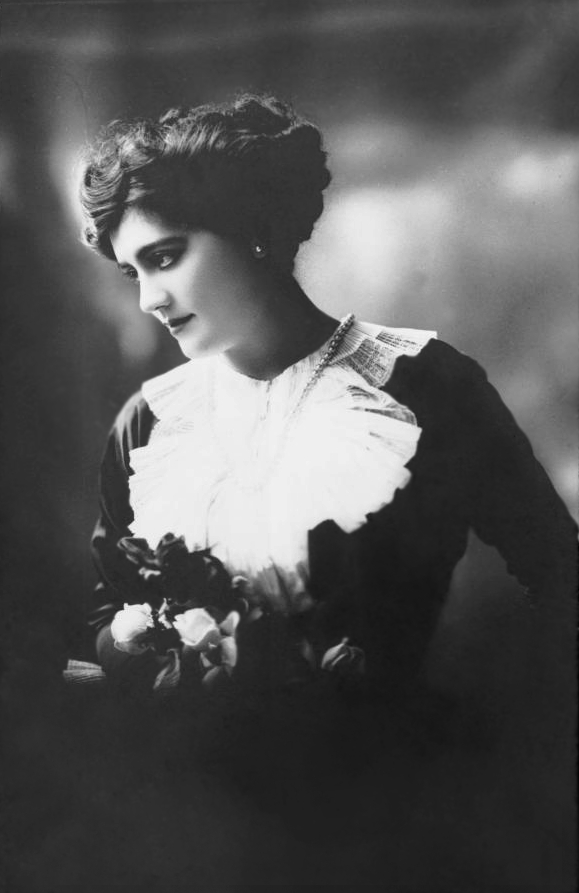
Mafalda Salvatini

Mafalda Salvatini (17 October 1886 – 13 June 1971) was an Italian opera singer who was primarily active in Germany during the first half of the 20th century. She excelled in the dramatic soprano repertoire of the Italian language and was one of the leading operatic sopranos in Berlin from 1908 to 1932. Although she performed as a guest artist in other German cities and in Austria, Belgium, France, the Netherlands, and Latvia, she never performed at theatres in her native country. She made several recordings for the Deutsche Grammophon and Odeon record labels.

== Life and career ==
Born in Baiae, Salvatini was the daughter of an officer of the Italian Army. She was orphaned at the age of 4 and thereafter was raised in boarding schools operated by the Sacred Heart in Portici and Paris. Her musical talents were evident at an early age and she was encouraged to pursue a singing career. She studied voice in Paris with Pauline Viardot-Garcia and Jean de Reszke. She later studied with Julius Lieban in Germany.

Salvatini made her professional opera debut in 1908 at the age of 21 at the Berlin State Opera in the title role of Giuseppe Verdi's Aida, together with Enrico Caruso, who is said to have carried her onto the stage because she would not come out to collect her applause. She remained active at that theatre through 1914, singing such roles as Leonora in Verdi's Il trovatore and the title role in Giacomo Puccini's Madama Butterfly. In 1912 she appeared as a guest artist at the Bavarian State Opera and in 1913 she made her debut with the Paris Opera as Valentine in Giacomo Meyerbeer's Les Huguenots.

In 1914 Salvatini joined the roster of singers at the Deutsche Oper Berlin, remaining committed there through 1923. Among the roles she sang there were Aida, Amelia in Verdi's Un ballo in maschera, Marta in Eugen d'Albert's Tiefland, Myrtocle in d'Albert's Die toten Augen, Rachel in La Juive, Santuzza in Pietro Mascagni's Cavalleria rusticana, Senta in The Flying Dutchman, Valentine, and the title roles in Georges Bizet's Carmen and Puccini's Tosca. She was committed again to the Berlin State Opera from 1924 to 1926 where she was heard in the title role of Puccini's Turandot for the work's Berlin premiere in 1926 under the baton of Bruno Walter. She then returned to the Deutsche Oper Berlin where she was active until her retirement from the stage in 1932.

Outside of Berlin, Salvatini was a guest artist at the Vienna State Opera in 1922 and in 1928. She performed at the Semperoper in Dresden in 1927 and in 1928, and made appearances at the opera house in Riga. She also performed at opera houses in the Netherlands and Belgium, including La Monnaie in Brussels.

When she moved to Berlin in 1908 she married Walter Gérard, a German scientist of Huguenot extraction, with whom she had two sons: the set and costume designer and painter Rolf Gérard and Charles E. (Horst) Gérard. Recent research has disproved claims that she was the mistress of Adolphus Frederick VI, Grand Duke of Mecklenburg-Strelitz from 1908 until his suicide in 1918 and that her two sons were illegitimate children of the Grand Duke. In 1933 she married Jurgis Šaulys, the Lithuanian Ambassador to Germany. At the outbreak of World War II they moved to Lugano in the Swiss canton of Ticino, where she died in 1971 at the age of 84.

Her grandson Alexander Gérard, son of Charles E. Gérard and an architect and real estate developer, became – together with his wife, the art historian Jana Marko – the initiator of the new concert hall in Hamburg known as Elbphilharmonie.
