= Signatories of the Act of Independence of Lithuania =

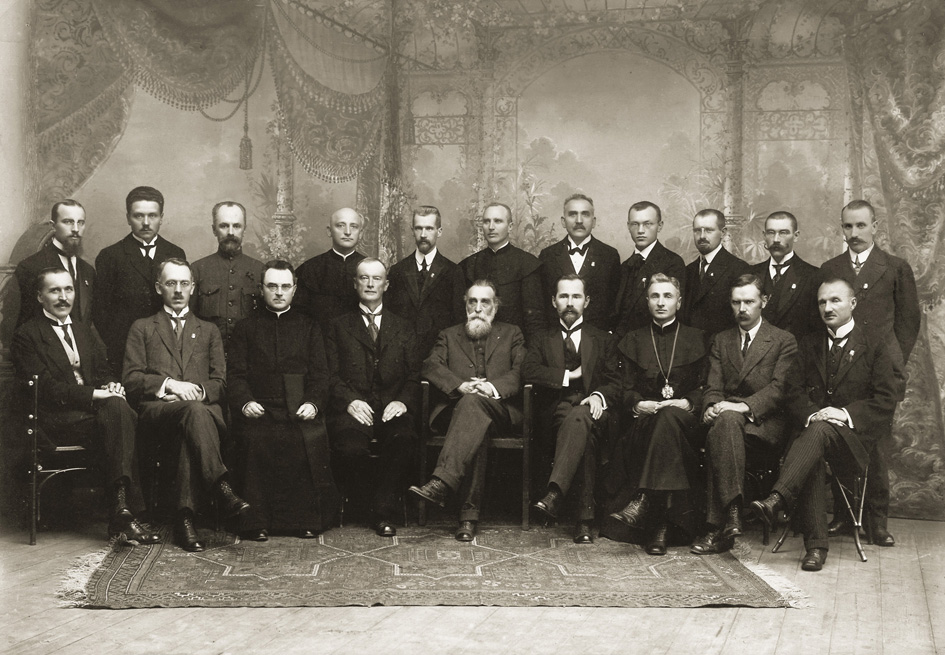
The twenty signatories

The signatories of the Act of Independence of Lithuania were the twenty Lithuanian men who signed the Act of Independence of Lithuania on February 16, 1918. The signatories were elected to the Council of Lithuania by the Vilnius Conference in September 1917 and entrusted with the mission of establishing an independent Lithuanian state. The proclaimed independence was established only in late 1918, after Germany lost World War I and its troops retreated from Lithuanian territory. What followed was a long process of building the state, determining its borders, and gaining international diplomatic recognition. The signatories succeeded in their mission and independent Lithuania survived until the Soviet Union occupied the state on June 15, 1940.

Their political, professional, and social backgrounds were diverse. Several rose to political prominence; Antanas Smetona and Aleksandras Stulginskis were later elected Presidents of Lithuania and Jonas Vileišis went on to become mayor of Kaunas, the temporary capital of Lithuania. After Lithuania lost its independence during World War II, six of the surviving signatories were sent to prison or executed by the Soviet government and six others emigrated to Western countries.

== Signatories ==
Image	Name	Political affiliation	Profession	Date and place of birth	Date and place of death
	Saliamonas Banaitis	Lithuanian Christian Democratic Party	Publisher	1866-07-15 in Vaitiekupiai village, Šakiai district	1933-05-04 in Kaunas, Lithuania
	Jonas Basanavičius	Nonpartisan	Physician	1851-10-23 in Ožkabaliai village, Naumiestis district	1927-02-16 in Wilno, Poland (now Vilnius, Lithuania)
	Mykolas Biržiška	Social Democratic Party	Lawyer	1882-08-24 in Viekšniai	1962-08-24 in Los Angeles, United States
	Kazimieras Bizauskas	Lithuanian Christian Democratic Party	Lawyer	1893-02-15 in Pavilosta, Latvia	1941-06-26 near Minsk, Belarus
	Pranas Dovydaitis	Lithuanian Christian Democratic Party	Lawyer	1886-12-02 in Runkiai village, Marijampolė district	1942-10-04 in Sverdlovsk prison camp, Russia
	Steponas Kairys	Social Democratic Party	Engineer	1879-01-03 in Užnevėžis village, Ukmergė district	1964-12-16 in New York City, United States
	Petras Klimas	Nonpartisan	Historian	1891-02-23 in Kušliškiai village, Marijampolė district	1969-01-16 in Kaunas, Lithuania
	Donatas Malinauskas	Nonpartisan	Agronomist	1869-03-07 in Krāslava, Latvia	1941-10-30 in a mass deportation camp in Siberia near Biysk, Russia
	Vladas Mironas	Lithuanian Nationalist Union	Catholic priest	1880-06-22 in Kuodiškiai village, Rokiškis district	1953-02-17 in Vladimir prison, Russia
	Stanisław Narutowicz	Nonpartisan	Lawyer	1862-09-02 in Brevikai village, Telšiai district	1932-12-31 in Kaunas, Lithuania
	Alfonsas Petrulis	Party of National Progress	Catholic priest	1873-08-04 in Kateliškiai village, Biržai district	1928-06-28 in Musninkai, Lithuania
	Antanas Smetona	Lithuanian Nationalist Union	Lawyer	1874-08-10 in Užulėnis village, Ukmergė district	1944-01-09 in Cleveland, Ohio, United States
	Jonas Smilgevičius	Nonpartisan	Economist	1870-02-12 in Šoniai village, Telšiai district	1942-09-27 in Kaunas, Lithuania
	Justinas Staugaitis	Lithuanian Christian Democratic Party	Catholic priest (Later bishop)	1866-10-14 in Tupikai village, Šakiai district	1943-07-08 in Telšiai, Lithuania
	Aleksandras Stulginskis	Lithuanian Christian Democratic Party	Agronomist	1885-02-26 in Kutaliai village, Raseiniai district	1969-09-22 in Kaunas, Lithuania
	Jurgis Šaulys	Nonpartisan	Financier	1879-05-05 in Balsėnai village, Tauragė district	1948-10-18 in Lugano, Switzerland
	Kazimieras Steponas Šaulys	Lithuanian Christian Democratic Party	Catholic priest	1872-01-28 in Stempliai village, Tauragė district	1964-05-09 in Lugano, Switzerland
	Jokūbas Šernas	Nonpartisan	Lawyer	1888-06-14 in Jasiškiai village, Biržai district	1926-07-31 in Kaunas, Lithuania
	Jonas Vailokaitis	Lithuanian Christian Democratic Party	Financier	1886-06-25 in Pikžirniai village, Šakiai district	1944-12-16 in Blankenburg, Germany
	Jonas Vileišis	Lithuanian Popular Socialist Democratic Party	Lawyer	1872-01-03 in Mediniai village, Biržai district	1942-06-01 in Kaunas, Lithuania

== Personal and professional backgrounds ==
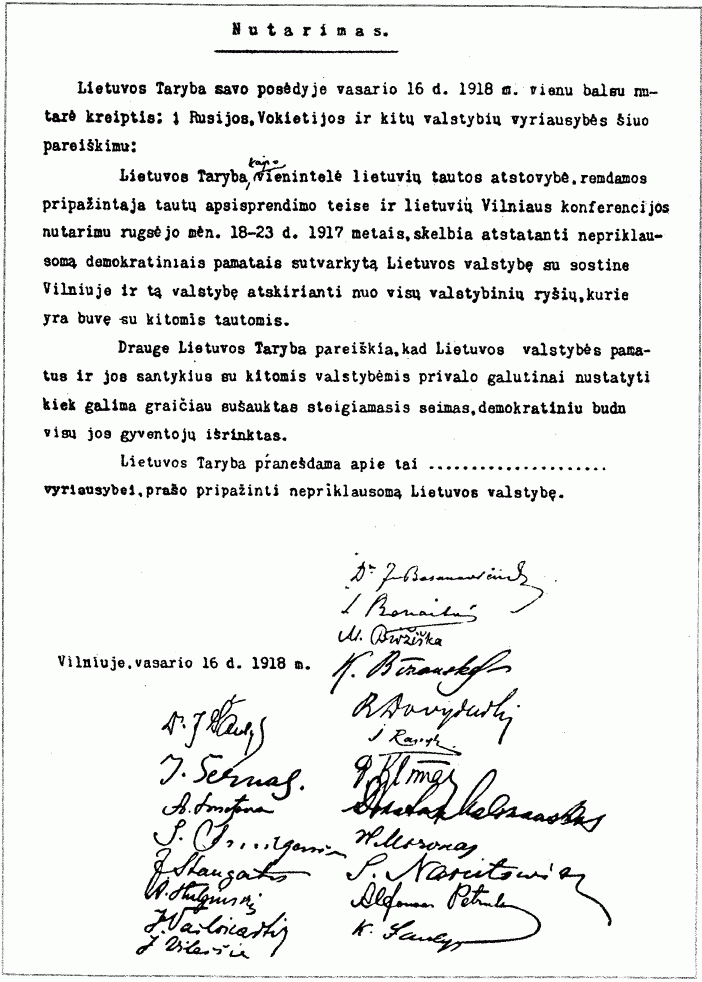
Facsimile of the Act of February 16

The signatories came from a variety of social backgrounds. Four had been born to Lithuanian noble families: Donatas Malinauskas, Stanisław Narutowicz, Jonas Smilgevičius, and Mykolas Biržiška. The other 16 were the children of farmers. The eldest of the signatories was Jonas Basanavičius, who was 67 at the time, and the youngest Kazimieras Bizauskas, who was 25. Of the remainder, three were in their fifties, six were in their forties, eight were in their thirties, and one was in his twenties. All, with the exception of Saliamonas Banaitis, had completed tertiary education. In 1926 he enrolled at Kaunas University, but his studies were left unfinished due to his death in 1933. In terms of educational background, the council was dominated by eight lawyers. The group also included four priests, two agronomists, two financiers, one physician, one economist, and an engineer. The majority of the signatories had received their higher education outside of Lithuania, since at the time Lithuania had no universities - Vilnius University was closed after the January Uprising in 1863. Five graduated from Saint Petersburg University, four from Moscow University, and two from Saint Petersburg State Institute of Technology.

By faith, nineteen of the signatories were Roman Catholics, although Jonas Basanavičius was not practicing. Jokūbas Šernas was the only professed Protestant Reformer. At the time of the Act of Independence, six of the signatories were officially nonpartisan, seven were members of the conservative Lithuanian Christian Democratic Party, two were affiliated with the Lithuanian Nationalist Union and the Social Democratic Party, and Jonas Vileišis was affiliated with the Party of National Progress and the left-wing Lithuanian Popular Socialist Democratic Party.

== Activities before the Act of Independence ==
The signatories had all been active in Lithuania's independence movement. Antanas Smetona, Donatas Malinauskas, and several others had participated in secret Lithuanian fellowships in the late 19th and early 20th centuries. These groups were involved in promoting the illegal distribution of Lithuanian-language publications using the Latin alphabet, which was banned by the Tsarist government from 1866 to 1904, as well as fighting other attempts at Russification by the authorities. Antanas Smetona, Steponas Kairys, Alfonsas Petrulis, and Mykolas Biržiška were expelled from their secondary schools for these activities. Jonas Basanavičius, the future chairman of the Council of Lithuania when the Act was signed, worked as a physician in Bulgaria and furthered the cause of public health there. Despite the demands of his medical work abroad, he contributed continuously to Lithuanian affairs. He organized the publication of a major underground newspaper, Aušra; its first issue appeared in 1883. Basanavičius was active in Bulgaria's political life as well, representing its Democratic party. Many of the signatories had participated in the 1905 Great Seimas of Vilnius, which shaped the political future of the Lithuanian state.

== Activities after the Act of Independence ==
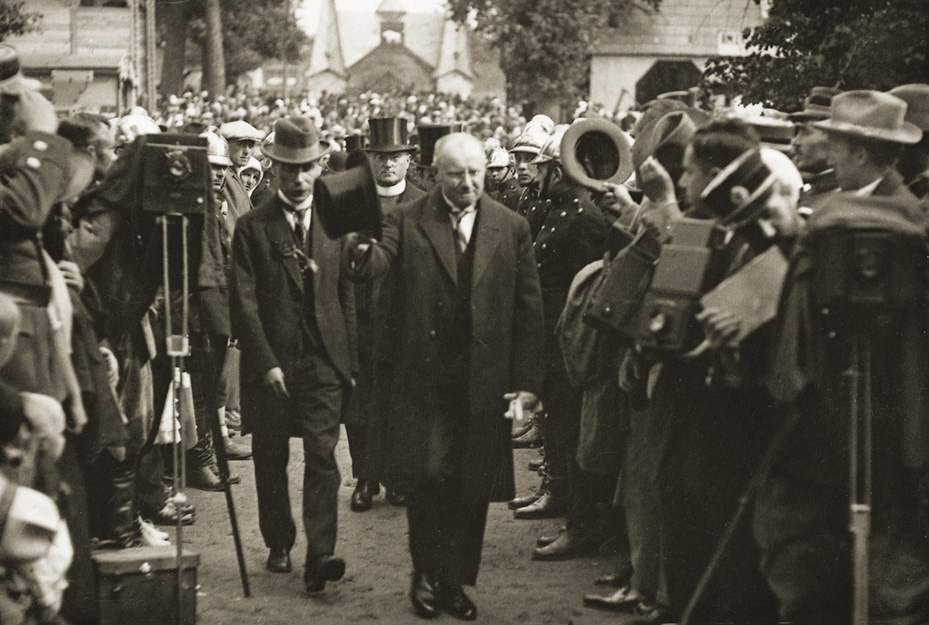
Signator Aleksandras Stulginskis (center) as President of Lithuania in Kaunas' agricultural exhibition, 1924

Most of the signatories remained active in the cultural and political life of independent Lithuania. Jonas Vileišis served in the Lithuanian Parliament and as mayor of Kaunas; Saliamonas Banaitis was involved in finance, opening several banks. Among the signatories were two future Presidents of Lithuania, Antanas Smetona and Aleksandras Stulginskis. Jonas Basanavičius returned to an academic life, pursuing his researches in Lithuanian culture and folklore. Five signatories died before World War II began; three died during the Nazi occupation of Lithuania. Those who did not emigrate to Western countries were arrested as political prisoners after Lithuania was occupied by the Soviet Union during World War II.

Aleksandras Stulginskis and Petras Klimas were sent to prison in Siberia by Soviet authorities, but survived and returned to Lithuania. Pranas Dovydaitis and Vladas Mironas were also sent to Siberia but died there. Kazys Bizauskas was shot along with a number of other prisoners on June 26, 1941, while being transported to a Soviet prison in Minsk. Donatas Malinauskas, along with many other civilians, was deported to Siberia and died there on November 30, 1942. His body was returned from Siberia in 1993 and reburied in Lithuania. Six of the surviving signatories emigrated to Western countries. Brothers Jurgis Šaulys and Kazimieras Steponas Šaulys died in Switzerland; Jonas Vailokaitis died in Germany; Antanas Smetona, Mykolas Biržiška and Steponas Kairys died in the United States.
