= Edvardas Turauskas =

Lithuanian diplomat

Edvardas Turauskas (30 May 1896 – 12 September 1966) was a Lithuanian diplomat.

He started law studies at the Saint Petersburg University, but they were interrupted by the October Revolution. In Lithuania, he joined the Ministry of Foreign Affairs which sent him to work at the Lithuanian legation in Switzerland. At the same time, he completed his philosophy and law studies at the University of Fribourg. He was the chargés d'affaires ad interim to Switzerland from June 1922 to the closing of the Lithuanian mission in August 1923. He then moved to Paris to study law at the University of Paris. He returned to Lithuania in 1926 and, as a member of the Lithuanian Christian Democratic Party, he was elected to the Third Seimas (parliament). He became the editor of the daily Rytas newspaper (1927–1928) and director of ELTA, the Lithuanian news agency (1928–1934). At the same time, he was active in Lithuanian public life. He was elected chairman of the Ateitis Federation of Catholic youth, an active member of various Catholic societies, and author and translator of several booklets. In 1934, Turauskas was appointed as the envoy to Czechoslovakia and later to Romania and Yugoslavia. After the German occupation of Czechoslovakia in March 1939, he returned to Lithuania and became the director of the Political Department of the Ministry of Foreign Affairs. He had to coordinate Lithuania's response to the outbreak of World War II and the Soviet–Lithuanian Mutual Assistance Treaty. In March 1940, he became a representative to the League of Nations and a deputy of Jurgis Šaulys, the Lithuanian envoy to Switzerland. After the Soviet occupation of Lithuania in June 1940, he worked to protect and preserve the Lithuanian Diplomatic Service as a representative of the independent Lithuania thus preserving the legal continuity of the Lithuanian state. He continued to represent Lithuania at the League of Nations until it was closed in 1946. He then retired from the diplomatic service and moved to Paris. He continued to be involved with various international and Lithuanian Catholic and anti-Soviet organizations, including Pax Romana, Assembly of Captive European Nations, European Movement International, Supreme Committee for the Liberation of Lithuania, American Lithuanian Council, United Lithuanian Relief Fund of America, until his death in 1966.

== Biography ==
=== Early life and education ===
Turauskas was born in Endriejavas, Kovno Governorate, Russian Empire. He was the only son of a sacristan who organized book smuggling during the Lithuanian press ban. After attending a local primary school in Endriejavas, Turauskas studied in Telšiai. From 1912, he chaired a local Ateitininkai (Catholic youth) student group. In spring 1915, due to World War I, he evacuated to Russia and attended schools in Babruysk (evacuated from Kiev) and Saratov until finally graduating from a Lithuanian school (evacuated from Vilkaviškis) in Voronezh in 1917. In fall 1917, he enrolled at the Saint Petersburg University to study law, but the studies were interrupted by the October Revolution. He wrote articles and assisted in editing the Catholic weekly Vadas. He helped Lithuanians persecuted by the new communist regime and had to go into hiding himself.

He returned to Lithuania in fall 1918 and joined the board of the Catholic Action Center and traveled across Samogitia organizing its local chapters. He briefly worked at the Press Bureau attached to the government of Lithuania. In March 1919, the Ministry of Foreign Affairs sent Turauskas to Bern in Switzerland to work at the Lithuanian legation with Vaclovas Sidzikauskas. At the same time, he underwent treatments to improve his poor health and studied philosophy and later law at the University of Fribourg. After graduation, he was promoted to the secretary of the Lithuanian legation in November 1921. When Sidzikauskas was moved to Berlin in June 1922, Turauskas headed the Lithuanian legation in Switzerland until it was closed in August 1923. With a stipend from the ministry, Turauskas studied law at the University of Paris. During his studies, he met Hungarian Hevesi András who depicted him as a character in his novel Párizsi eső (Paris Rain). He also met the French writer and journalist Jean Mauclère and inspired him to write more than 200 articles and several books on Lithuania. He completed his doctoral studies, but did not submit his PhD thesis. In Paris, he met Elena Jankauskaitė, daughter of a Lithuanian chef working at the Hôtel Ritz Paris, and they were married by Justinas Staugaitis at the Telšiai Cathedral on 8 August 1926. They had no children.

=== Career in Lithuania ===
Upon return to Lithuania in 1926, Turauskas, as a member of the Lithuanian Christian Democratic Party, was elected to the Third Seimas where he was a member of the Foreign Affairs Committee. However, the Seimas was dissolved in April 1927 after the coup d'état in December 1926. In January 1927, Turauskas became the editor of the daily newspaper Rytas published by the Lithuanian Christian Democratic Party. He edited it until he became the director of ELTA, the Lithuanian news agency, on 1 November 1928. At ELTA, he collaborated with the Latvian (LATA) and Estonian (ETA) news agencies. He separated ELTA from the Ministry of Foreign Affairs and made it an independent agency. In 1934, he organized a trip of Lithuanian writers and journalists across Russia and participated in conferences leading to the formation of the Baltic Entente. The authoritarian regime of the Lithuanian Nationalist Union disliked Turauskas, but could not find an excuse to remove him.

Turauskas was also active in the Lithuanian Catholic life. He was elected as the chairman of the central committee of the Ateitis Federation during a conference on 17–18 September 1926 and was reelected in July 1927 and June 1930. For some time, he also served as the federation's treasurer and judge. He organized various events, delivered lectures, wrote articles to the federation's press. He also returned to the Catholic Action Center and joined the Lithuanian section of the Society of Saint Vincent de Paul. As a member of the Lithuanian Catholic Academy of Science, in 1933, he published a study on the sovereignty of the Church and the state which reflected the growing friction between the ruling Lithuanian Nationalist Union and the Catholic Church in Lithuania. He also published booklets on nationalism and Christianity (1928), fundamentals of law (1929), introduction to the League of Nations (1932), and news agencies (1933) as well as translated from French works by Émile Guerry (1928), François Olivier-Martin (1931), and Étienne Magnin (1932).

=== Diplomatic career ===
On 1 September 1934, Turauskas returned to the Lithuanian Diplomatic Service – he was appointed as the Envoy Extraordinary and Minister Plenipotentiary to Czechoslovakia with residence in Prague. A year later, he also became the Lithuanian envoy to Romania and Yugoslavia. On 16 February 1938, he was awarded the Order of the Lithuanian Grand Duke Gediminas (2nd degree). After the German occupation of Czechoslovakia in March 1939, Turauskas needed a different assignment. Stasys Lozoraitis, Minister of Foreign Affairs, suggested Riga, Latvia, but Latvians did not want to accept Turauskas. Instead, he was appointed as the director of the Political Department of the Ministry of Foreign Affairs (position second only to the minister in the ministry's hierarchy) on 1 June 1939. In this capacity, he had to respond to the Molotov–Ribbentrop Pact and the outbreak of World War II as well as the Soviet–Lithuanian Mutual Assistance Treaty and the transfer of Vilnius Region to Lithuania. On 1 March 1940, he became a deputy of Jurgis Šaulys, the Lithuanian envoy to Switzerland, and a representative to the League of Nations. Turauskas delayed his departure from Kaunas until 15 June, the day after the Soviet ultimatum to Lithuania. Since he had been planning his departure since March, unlike President Antanas Smetona who had to flee within hours, he was able to take some important government archives with him.

In Switzerland, a neutral country, Turauskas worked to coordinate the efforts of Lithuanian diplomats to protect and preserve the Lithuanian Diplomatic Service as a representative of the independent Lithuania, thus preserving the legal continuity of the Lithuanian state. He also worked on the failed plans to organize a government-in-exile, on normalizing the relationship between the diplomatic service and the Supreme Committee for the Liberation of Lithuania (VLIK), and on preserving the pre-war gold reserves of Lithuania kept at the Bank for International Settlements. There were aborted plans for getting Turauskas recognized as a diplomatic representative to Portugal or Spain, but he was suspected of misappropriating funds and implicated in a watch smuggling scandal involving Liechtensteiner, Polish, and South American diplomats. He continued to officially represent Lithuania to Romania and Yugoslavia until these countries were occupied by the Soviet Union and Nazi Germany and to the League of Nations until the league was closed in 1946. He voluntarily resigned from the diplomatic service in 1946 and moved to Paris.

=== Exile ===
Turauskas participated in and attended congresses of various international organizations, many of them Catholic or anti-Soviet, including Pax Romana, Nouvelles Équipes Internationales (NEI, predecessor of the Centrist Democrat International), Assembly of Captive European Nations, European Movement International, Académie Diplomatique Internationale. In 1947, he had a private audience with Pope Pius XII regarding the Lithuanian affairs. He also was active in Lithuanian organizations, including VLIK, American Lithuanian Council (ALT), reestablished Lithuanian Catholic Academy of Science, United Lithuanian Relief Fund of America (BALF). He collaborated on the Lithuanian-language radio programs on the Vatican Radio and Voice of America. In 1954, VLIK published his book Le Sort des états baltes (The Fate of the Baltic States) in French. In 1960, during a visit by Nikita Khrushchev, Premier of the Soviet Union, Turauskas and other active anti-Soviet activists were deported to Corsica for Khrushchev's security.

In 1947, Turauskas moved to France and bought a small farm near Paris. He struggled financially and worked as a life insurance salesman. Turauskas died on 12 September 1966 in Nanterre, a suburb of Paris, after falling down the stairs. His archives, including some sensitive documents taken from Lithuania when he left in June 1940, ended up at the Hoover Institution Library and Archives and at the Lithuanian Emigration Institute in Kaunas. His memoirs, a valuable record of the last days of Lithuania's independence, were published in 1979 in Chicago and republished in 1990 in Vilnius.

== See also ==
- List of Lithuanian diplomats (1918–1940)
