= Lithuanian conferences during World War I =

The Lithuanian conferences during World War I refer to ten conferences held by Lithuanian activists during World War I in Switzerland and Sweden. They articulated the vision of independent Lithuanian state free of Russian, German, and Polish influence and as such were an important step towards the Act of Independence of Lithuania in February 1918.

The historical Grand Duchy of Lithuania was in a union with the Kingdom of Poland from the 1385 Union of Krewo until it became part of the Russian Empire as a result of the Third Partition in 1795. During World War I, Lithuania was occupied by the German Empire and political freedom within Lithuania was restricted by Ober Ost officials. Only one conference, the Vilnius Conference in September 1917, was allowed in Lithuania. The Lithuanians were concerned with the fate of Lithuania after the war as its powerful neighbors (Russia, Germany, Poland) had their own plans. The conferences in Switzerland and Sweden, as neutral countries, provided an avenue for them to discuss political realities and create visions for the future of independent Lithuania. The conferences also facilitated exchange of information and ideas, coordination of financial aid and political efforts.

The first conferences were organized by Juozas Gabrys and held in Switzerland, which became a hub of Lithuanian activities after Gabrys moved there from Paris. He had a talent for public relations and ran the Lithuanian Information Bureau which supplied European powers with information on Lithuania and its aspirations. The first conferences were more meetings and discussions between private individuals, but they steadily grew in clout and recognition.

== Summary ==
#	Date	Location	Country	Summary of resolutions	Ref
1	3–4 August 1915	Bern	Switzerland	Discussed autonomy (not independence) for a joint Lithuanian–Latvian state	
2	9–11 October 1915	Stockholm	Sweden	Established the Swedish–Lithuanian Aid Committee	
3	12–14 February 1916 (Note: Conference's documents are dated 1–5 March 1916 in Bern.)	Fribourg	Switzerland	Rejected ideas of a Polish–Lithuanian state and demanded for full independence for Lithuania	
4	25–30 April 1916	Bern (Note: Supposedly held in The Hague to confuse the police.)	Switzerland	Reaffirmed demands for a full independence from both Russia and Germany	
5	30 May – 4 June 1916	Lausanne	Switzerland	Established the Council of the Lithuanian Nation to represent Lithuania	
6	30 June – 4 July 1916	Lausanne	Switzerland	Confirmed resolutions of the first Lausanne conference, except for statements condemning Germany	
-	9–16 June 1917	Petrograd	Russian Empire	See: Petrograd Seimas. Broke down due to disagreements whether to seek autonomy or full independence.	
-	8–22 September 1917	Vilnius	German-occupied Lithuania	See: Vilnius Conference. Elected the Council of Lithuania to seek independence of Lithuania.	
7	18–20 October 1917	Stockholm	Sweden	Approved the resolutions adopted by Vilnius Conference and recognized Council of Lithuania as the main representative of the Lithuanian nation	
8	2–10 November 1917	Bern	Switzerland	Various issues, including territorial claims, relationship with ethnic minorities, form of government	
9	3–6 January 1918	Stockholm	Sweden	Demanded Russia and Germany to recognize independent Lithuania	
10	5–16 September 1918	Lausanne	Switzerland	Broke down due to disagreements	

== Conference proceedings ==
=== First conferences ===
==== Bern in August 1915 ====
The first conference was held jointly with Latvians, the northern neighbors of Lithuania, in August 1915, when Lithuania was not yet fully overtaken by German forces. The conference was organized by Juozas Gabrys, who was introduced to Latvian activists by Atis Ķeniņš, and Antanas Viskantas.

The representatives adopted a resolution which expressed their solidarity with the Entente Powers and condemned atrocities committed by German troops. They resolved to seek vast autonomy (not yet full independence) for a joint Lithuanian–Latvian state that would encompass a territory of 250,000 square kilometres (97,000 sq mi). For comparison, present-day Latvia and Lithuania cover approximately 130,000 square kilometres (50,000 sq mi). However, the plans for a joint Lithuanian–Latvian independence movement did not materialize and, it seems, the resolution remained the only document calling for a joint Lithuanian–Latvian state.

==== Stockholm in October 1915 ====
As war progressed, Gabrys' attitudes shifted in support of Germany which adopted a policy, articulated by Alexander Parvus, supporting various nations seeking autonomy or independence from Russia. In October 1915, together with Estonian Aleksander Kesküla, Gabrys traveled to Stockholm to meet with Martynas Yčas, member of the Russian State Duma, and Stasys Šilingas, an employee of the Russian Ministry of Internal Affairs.

Kesküla wanted to persuade Yčas to resign from the Duma in support for Germany. Yčas wanted to organize a much broader conference with Lithuanian representatives from Lithuania, Russia, Western Europe, and United States and was disappointed that only Gabrys could attend. Jonas Aukštuolis and Ignas Šeinius also attended the meeting. The meeting, self-declared the First Lithuanian Conference, did not adopt a political statement. Nevertheless, the men established a war refugee relief organization, the Swedish–Lithuanian Aid Committee (Lithuanian: Švedų-lietuvių šelpimo komitetas), which included chairman Carl Lindhagen, mayor of Stockholm, secretary Verner Söderberg, editor of Stockholms Dagblad, and Lithuanian manager Jonas Aukštuolis.

==== Fribourg in February 1916 ====
The next conference was held in February 1916 in Fribourg (to confuse the police, conference's documents are dated 1–5 March 1916 in Bern). In addition to Swiss Lithuanians (Vladas Daumantas-Dzimidavičius, Juozas Gabrys, Juozas Purickis, Antanas Steponaitis, Justinas Tumėnas, Antanas Viskanta), it was attended by Juozas Tumas-Vaižgantas and Jonas Žilius-Jonila.

The most important issue on the agenda was Lithuania's relationship with Poland. The Poles sought to resurrect the old Polish–Lithuanian Commonwealth which Lithuanians perceived as a threat to their national identity and as an usurpation of their self-determination rights. The conference rejected ideas of a Polish–Lithuanian state and, while fully supporting the Polish bid for independence within ethnographic Poland, asserted their self-determination rights within the ethnographic Lithuania. Also, for the first time, Lithuanians unequivocally raised demands for full independence for Lithuania. After the conference, Lithuanian emigrants did not backtrack and continued to resolutely demand independence. Such demands were met with anger in the Russian press which saw the conference as a German propaganda ploy. Both German and Russian agents began tracking Lithuanian activities in Switzerland.

==== Bern in April 1916 ====
The second conference in Bern was held two months later, in April 1916, in reaction to a speech by Theobald von Bethmann Hollweg, Chancellor of Germany, in the Reichstag. Bethmann Hollweg declared that after the war Poland, Lithuania, and Latvia would not return to Russia. The conference produced a long list complaints against Russia but also emphasized that they did not desire to replace one yoke for another. Therefore, the conference reaffirmed demands for a full independence from both Russia and Germany.

=== Conferences in Lausanne ===
==== First Lausanne Conference ====
Two conferences were held in Lausanne in summer 1916. The first Lausanne conference was attended by Swiss Lithuanians, Martynas Yčas (who also was chairman of the conference) from Russia, and Vincas Bartuška, Jonas Julius Bielskis, and Romanas Karuža from United States. Notably, representatives from Lithuania were absent as they did not receive travel permits from Ober Ost officials.

Attendees read five presentations on activities of Lithuanians in Russia (Martynas Yčas), in United States (Romanas Karuža), and in Switzerland (Vladas Daumantas-Dzimidavičius) and on operations of the refugee aid committee Lithuania (Antanas Steponaitis) and Lithuanian Information Bureau (Juozas Gabrys). The conference was passionate and argumentative as representatives tried to decide which great power – Russia or Germany – should be relied on in hopes for future independence. Because Yčas was the chairman, the conference avoided anti-Russian statements but protested against exploitative German policies. One unifying point was the stance against the Central Committee for the Relief of War Victims in Lithuania, chaired by Bronisław Piłsudski and established at the end of 1915 together with pro-Polish landowners. The conference decided to disband it as it presented a threat of Polonization.

The conference decided to expand the Lithuanian Information Bureau and establish a permanent institution, the five-member Council of the Lithuanian Nation (Lithuanian: Lietuvių tautos taryba) in Switzerland, to unite Lithuanian activists in Lithuania, Russia, and United States. The conference expressed its disappointment over infighting among Lithuanian Americans due to political differences and called for a unifying Supreme Lithuanian American Council. It also urged Lithuanians, particularly those living in the United States, to donate more generously towards Lithuanian causes and rebuilding after the war. The conference prepared a memorandum to Pope Benedict XV requesting creation of a Lithuanian archdiocese with the seat in Vilnius and a Lithuanian diocese in the United States. The Lithuanian Information Bureau was tasked with drafting a plan on reestablishing Vilnius University.

==== Conference of the Nationalities ====
The second Lausanne conference was held at the end of the Third Conference of the Nationalities (French: IIIme Conférence des nationalités), also known as the Third Congress of Oppressed Peoples, which was organized by the Union of Nationalities (French: Union des Nationalités) on 27–29 June 1916. Gabrys was heavily involved in the Union and the Lithuanian question was always its priority. The Germans supported the conference as they saw it as an opportunity to create negative publicity against Russia by promoting the plight of nations seeking independence or autonomy from Russia. They invited representatives of Tatars, Kyrgyzstanis, Persians, and other peoples from the Russian Empire.

In total, 27 nations were represented by 3000 attendees. The Germans also allowed three Lithuanian representatives (Antanas Smetona, Steponas Kairys, Jurgis Šaulys; Antanas Žmuidzinavičius was initially selected instead of Smetona) to attend, who brought a memorandum, signed by twelve Lithuanian activists, addressed to Woodrow Wilson, President of the United States. During the conference, chaired by Paul Otlet, Lithuanian priest Vincas Bartuška read the Lithuanian statement which again repeated demands for full independence. Only two other nations, Poland and Finland, expressed their desire for full independence.

==== Second Lausanne Conference ====
After the Conference of the Nationalities, Lithuanians organized their own conference in secret. The second Lausanne conference, chaired by Smetona, confirmed resolutions of the first conference, adopted a month before, except for statements condemning Germany. After hearing reports from Lithuanian representatives on the deplorable conditions within Lithuania, the conference also called for Lithuanian professionals (doctors, teachers, artisans, businessperson, etc.) to return from Russia, United States, and other communities to Lithuania and help rebuild the country.

Right after the conference, Gabrys sent out a memorandum to Ober Ost officials in the name of the not-yet-organized Council of the Lithuanian Nation. The memorandum asked Germans to ease their control of life in Lithuania (censure of letters, travel restrictions, monitoring of activities of various societies) and liberalize education (allow Lithuanians establish their own schools and select teachers). Later, a memorandum in the name of the Swiss Lithuanian Council (Lithuanian: Šveicarijos lietuvių taryba) was sent out to various foreign diplomatic services, except Russia. The memorandum briefly outlined the history of Lithuania, ethnographic borders of the Lithuanian state, and resolutions adopted by the two Lithuanian conferences in Lausanne.

=== Post Vilnius Conference ===
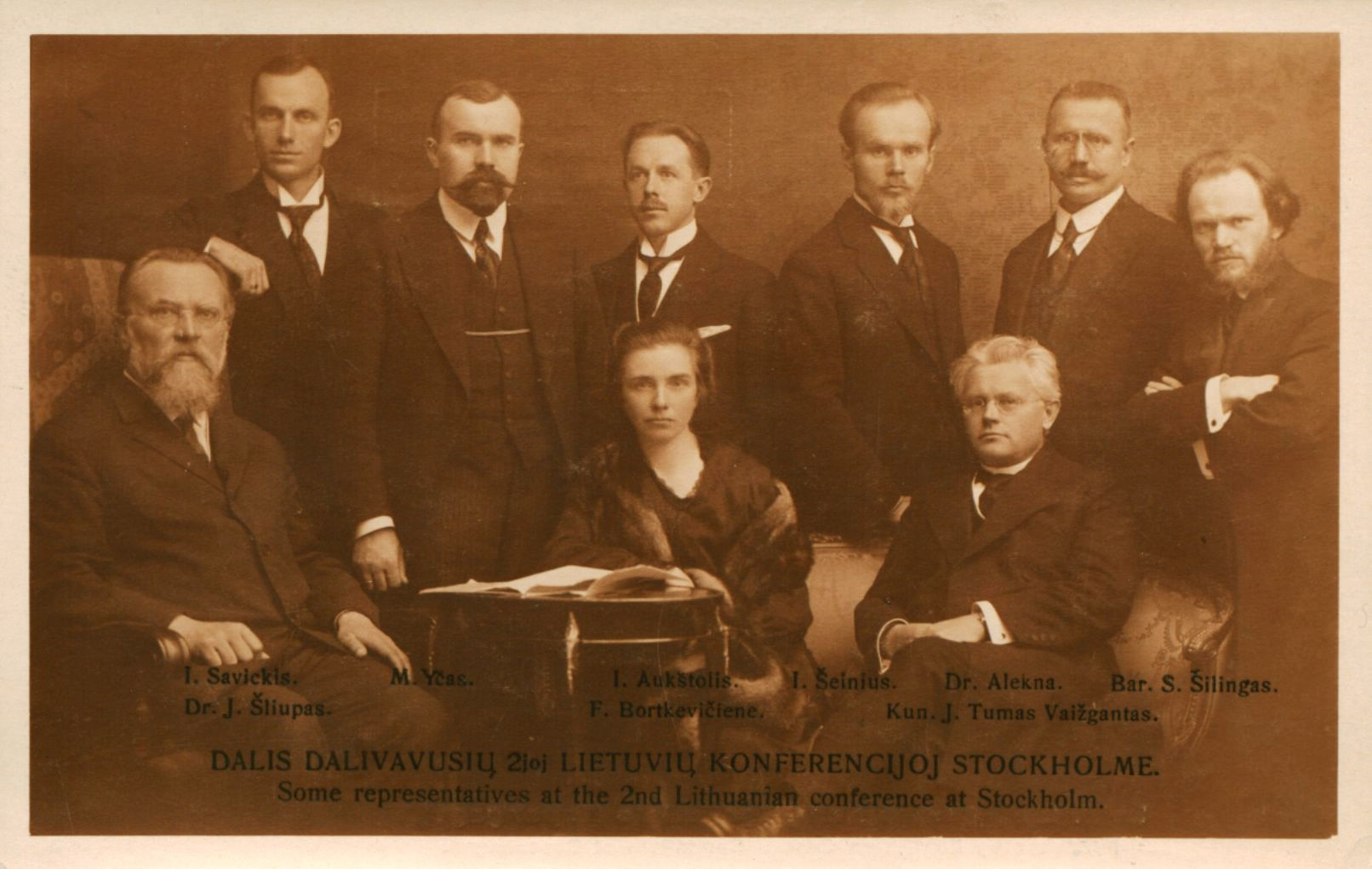
Delegates at the Stockholm conference in 1917

==== Stockholm in October 1917 ====
In September 1917, Lithuanians organized Vilnius Conference in German-occupied Lithuania and elected the 20-member Council of Lithuania to represent the nation and establish independent Lithuania. The council delegated Konstantinas Olšauskas and Juozas Purickis, who had to travel to Lithuania with fake passports, to the conference in Stockholm in October 1917. The conference was also attended by vice-chairmen of the council Jurgis Šaulys, representatives from Russia (Juozas Tumas-Vaižgantas, Martynas Yčas, Felicija Bortkevičienė, Stasys Šilingas), United States (Jonas Šliūpas), and Scandinavia (Jonas Aukštuolis, Jurgis Savickis, Ignas Šeinius).

The primary goal of this conference was to obtain approval of Lithuanians in Russia and United States for the new Council of Lithuania thus preventing competing claims of representing the nation. While the delegates where skeptical and critical of the council's reliance on Germany, they approved the resolutions adopted by Vilnius Conference and recognized Council of Lithuania as the main representative of the Lithuanian nation.

==== Bern in November 1917 ====
The conference in Bern in November 1917 was attended by six members of the Council of Lithuania (Antanas Smetona, Steponas Kairys, Jurgis Šaulys, Alfonsas Petrulis, and Justinas Staugaitis) as well as Swiss Lithuanians (Vincas Bartuška, Vladas Daumantas, Juozas Purickis, Konstantinas Olšauskas, Juozas Gabrys, Antanas Steponaitis). Maironis attended as a guest.

The conference lasted eight days and discussed a broad range of issues, getting into some constitutional issues. The conference made a lot more specific decisions on issues including territorial claims, relationship with ethnic minorities, strategies for securing independence, rebuilding after the war, form of government (democratic republic vs. constitutional monarchy – majority voted for monarchy, but the decision was not widely publicized). For strategy, the conference decided to seek recognition of Lithuania from Germany and recognition of Lithuania's right of self-determination from the Entente.

The conference resolved that the territory should be determined based on ethnographic principles. In particular, the conference deemed that the former Russian Governorates of Kaunas and Suwałki as well as almost the entire Vilna Governorate and four uyezds (districts) of the Grodno Governorate (Białystok, Grodno, Slonim and Vawkavysk) should belong to Lithuania. The delegates did not mention Lithuania's aspirations to the Lithuania Minor, which was then part of East Prussia. Instead of demanding the port of Klaipėda (Memel), they decided to demand Liepāja.

The conference also discussed Polish–Lithuanian relations in the Diocese of Vilnius. The conference adopted a resolution calling for the resignation of the diocese administrator Kazimierz Mikołaj Michalkiewicz and the newly appointed curia of Vilnius Cathedral. The conference further resolved to appeal to the pope requesting to appoint a Lithuanian as the next bishop of Vilnius.

Unofficially, Swiss Lithuanians were tasked with the foreign representation, particularly to the Entente powers, thus shielding the Council of Lithuania from German criticism that it was cooperating with German enemies. It was also decided to strengthen the Council of the Lithuanian Nation in Switzerland, chaired by Olšauskas, and keep it separate from the Lithuanian Information Bureau, headed by Gabrys, thus limiting Gabrys' ambitions and paving the way for a wider conflict with Gabrys.

==== Stockholm in January 1918 ====
There is little information available on the third conference in Stockholm in January 1918. The conference was organized during a break in the negotiations of the Treaty of Brest-Litovsk between Russia and Germany, and after the Council of Lithuania adopted the Act of 11 December, which declared Lithuania's independence but called for "a firm and permanent alliance" with Germany. The conference was attended by Jurgis Šaulys, member of the Council of Lithuania, who was expecting to receive Germany's recognition of Lithuania's independence. While waiting, Šaulys organized discussions with Šliūpas, Juozas Tumas-Vaižgantas, Jonas Aukštuolis, Ignas Šeinius.

Conference's proceedings are primarily known from an English-language booklet published by Jonas Šliūpas in which he reprinted conference's resolution with a seven-point demand list to Russia and Germany to recognize independent Lithuania, repay war damages, withdraw their armies, include Lithuanian representatives in any peace negotiations. The resolution was also published in Stockholms Dagblad.

==== Lausanne in September 1918 ====
The last conference was held in Lausanne in September 1918. It was attended by members of the Council of Lithuania (Antanas Smetona, Augustinas Voldemaras, Juozas Purickis, Martynas Yčas, Alfonsas Petrulis), representatives from the United States (Vincas Bartuška, Balys Mastauskas, Kazys Pakštas, Juozas Dabužis), and Swiss Lithuanians.

The conference discussed a number of issues, including territorial claims, organization of government institutions and military, foreign relations of Lithuania with its neighbors and global powers, etc. However, instead of increased coordination of efforts, a major ideological dispute further fragmented the Lithuanian independence movement and caused further confusion among foreigners when disagreements aired in the Swiss newspaper Der Bund. Members of the Council maintained that the conference was only an advisory body, while Lithuanian émigrés, particularly Gabrys, wanted to establish an equal or a superior authority in the west. Lithuanians living abroad wanted to minimize any ties with Germany that was losing the war and instead rely on the Entente Powers that would decide the fate of Europe in a future peace conference. Lithuanians living in Lithuania, still occupied by Germany, thought that Germany was the only major power to be taken into account for the foreseeable future. They reasoned that if the Council of Lithuania was to have any sway with the Germans, it had to be the sole authority of the Lithuanian people. According to historian Alfred Erich Senn, it was a major policy error as the Council of Lithuania did gain a reputation of a "German tool" and it impeded Lithuania's international recognition.

Germany surrendered in November 1918 and the conferences abroad lost their purpose. The center of political life returned to Lithuania.

== See also ==
- Great Seimas of Vilnius
- Lithuanian Wars of Independence

== Bibliography ==
- Bacevičius, Romas (26 September 2008). "Kunigas, statęs Lietuvos valstybės pamatus". XXI amžius (in Lithuanian). 73 (1666). ISSN 2029-1299.
- Bacon, Leonard, ed. (1916). "The Chancellor's Speech". The Independent. 86. OCLC 4927591.
- Biržiška, Vaclovas, ed. (1954). "Berno konferencija". Lietuvių enciklopedija (in Lithuanian). Vol. II. Lietuvių enciklopedijos leidykla. OCLC 14547758.
- Čepėnas, Pranas (1986). Naujųjų laikų Lietuvos istorija (in Lithuanian). Vol. II. Chicago: Dr. Kazio Griniaus Fondas. OCLC 3220435.
- Eidintas, Alfonsas; Žalys, Vytautas; Senn, Alfred Erich (1999). Tuskenis, Edvardas (ed.). Lithuania in European Politics: The Years of the First Republic, 1918-1940 (Paperback ed.). New York: St. Martin's Press. ISBN 0-312-22458-3.
- Eidintas, Alfonsas; Bumblauskas, Alfredas; Kulakauskas, Antanas; Tamošaitis, Mindaugas (2013). The History of Lithuania (PDF). Eugrimas. ISBN 978-609-437-204-9. Archived from the original (PDF) on 2013-12-15.
- Gaigalaitė, Aldona; Žeimantienė, Jūratė (2004). Juozas Purickis-Vygandas (in Lithuanian). Vilnius: Vilniaus knyga. ISBN 9955-490-27-6.
- Gimžauskas, Edmundas, ed. (2006a). "Įvadas". Lietuva vokiečių okupacijoje Pirmojo pasaulinio karo metais, 1915–1918. Dokumentų rinkinys (in Lithuanian). Vilnius: Lietuvos istorijos institutas. ISBN 9789986780809.
- Gimžauskas, Edmundas, ed. (2006b). Lietuva vokiečių okupacijoje Pirmojo pasaulinio karo metais, 1915–1918. Dokumentų rinkinys (PDF) (in Lithuanian). Vilnius: Lietuvos istorijos institutas. ISBN 9789986780809.
- Grigaravičiūtė, Sandra (2000). "Skandinavija lietuvių diplomatijoje 1915-1917 metais". Lietuvos istorijos studijos (in Lithuanian). 8. ISSN 1392-0448.
- Grigaravičiūtė, Sandra (1999). "1918 m.: sausio 3 ir vasario 16 Lietuvos istorijoje" (PDF). Istorija. Mokslo darbai (in Lithuanian). 38. ISSN 1392-0456.
- Grigaravičiūtė, Sandra (2002). Skandinavija Lietuvos diplomatijoje 1918-1940 metais (in Lithuanian). Vilnius: Saulabrolis. ISBN 9789986814634.
- Grigaravičiūtė, Sandra (2017). "Lietuvos Tarybos atstovavimas Sovietų Rusijoje 1918 metais" (PDF). Parlamento Studijos (in Lithuanian). 23. ISSN 1648-9896.
- Jurėnienė, Virginija (2002). "Visuomenės iniciatyva kuriant Lietuvos universitetą". Lietuvos istorijos studijos (in Lithuanian). 10. ISSN 1392-0448.
- Katilius, Algimantas (2017). Vasario 16-osios Akto signataras kunigas Alfonsas Petrulis (in Lithuanian). Vilnius: Lietuvos nacionalinis muziejus. ISBN 978-609-478-001-1.
- Klimas, Petras (1990). Iš mano atsiminimų (in Lithuanian). Lietuvos enciklopedijų redakcija. ISBN 5899500050.
- Lopata, Raimundas (1996). "Lietuvos valstybingumo raida 1914–1918 metais" (PDF). Lietuvių atgimimo istorijos studijos (in Lithuanian). 9. ISSN 1392-0391.
- MELC (2008-06-30). "Lozanos lietuvių konferencija". Visuotinė lietuvių enciklopedija (in Lithuanian). Mokslo ir enciklopedijų leidybos centras.
- Merkelis, Aleksandras (1964). Antanas Smetona: jo visuomeninė, kultūrinė ir politinė veikla (in Lithuanian). New York: Amerikos lietuvių tautinės sąjunga. OCLC 421089.
- Misiūnas, Remigijus (2004). Informacinių kovų kryžkelėse: JAV lietuvių informacinės kovos XIX a. pabaigoje – 1922 m. (PDF) (in Lithuanian). Vilnius: Versus Aurius. ISBN 9955-601-39-6.
- Pukienė, Vida (2013). Prelatas Konstantinas Olšauskas: visuomenės veikėjo tragedija (PDF). Edukologija. ISBN 978-9955-20-884-6. Archived from the original (PDF) on 2018-08-11.
- Reynolds, Michael A. (2011). Shattering Empires: The Clash and Collapse of the Ottoman and Russian Empires 1908-1918. Cambridge University Press. ISBN 978-1139494120.
- Senn, Alfred Erich (1975). The Emergence of Modern Lithuania (2nd ed.). Westport, CT: Greenwood Press. ISBN 0-8371-7780-4.
- Senn, Alfred Erich (1980). Jonas Basanavičius: The Patriarch of the Lithuanian National Renaissance. East European Biography Series. Newtonville, Mass: Oriental Research Papers. ISBN 0-89250-251-7.
- Skirius, Juozas (2002-12-16). "Berno lietuvių konferencijos". Visuotinė lietuvių enciklopedija (in Lithuanian). Mokslo ir enciklopedijų leidybos centras.
- Skirius, Juozas (2008-06-30). "Lozanos lietuvių konferencija". Visuotinė lietuvių enciklopedija (in Lithuanian). Mokslo ir enciklopedijų leidybos centras.
- Watson, D. R. (November 1995). "Jean Pélissier and the Office Central des Nationalités, 1912-1919". The English Historical Review. 110 (439). Oxford University Press: 1191–1206. doi:10.1093/ehr/CX.439.1191. ISSN 0013-8266. JSTOR 577256.
