= Alizava =

- Town
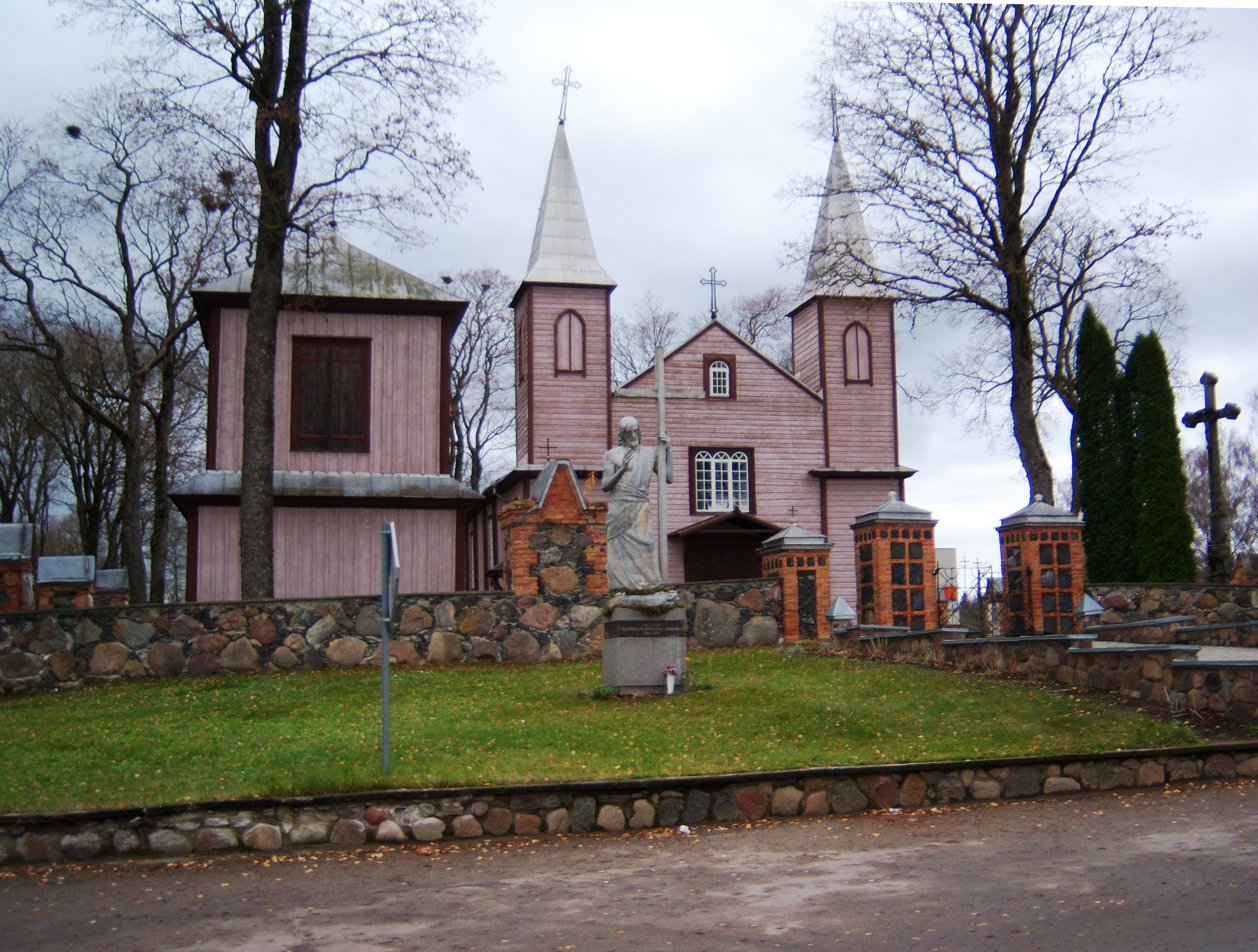

- Location within Lithuania
- Coordinates: 55°58′20″N 25°0′0″E
- Country: Lithuania
- County: Panevėžys County

Population (2011)
  - Total: 344
- Time zone: UTC+2 (EET)
  - Summer (DST): UTC+3 (EEST)

Alizava is a town in Panevėžys County, in central-eastern Lithuania. According to the 2011 census, the town has a population of 344 people.

== Etymology ==
The toponym Alizava originates from the given name Aloyzas. Until the end of the 18th century, the settlement was called Pakapė. Pakapė derives from the Lithuanian word "kapas", meaning "grave" or "tomb". The prefix "pa-" in Lithuanian often denotes "near" or "by", most likely because the town only had a cemetery and a tavern. In 1794, local landowner Antanas Koscialkovskis built a church here and named it Alizava in honor of his son Aloyzas. In other languages the town's name is translated as: Polish: Alojzów.
