= Kazys Bizauskas =

Lithuanian politician (1893–1941)

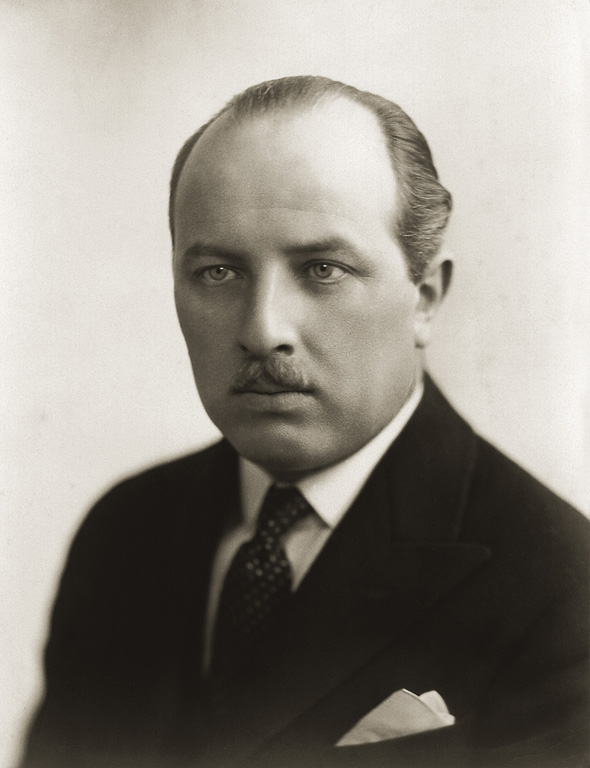
Kazys Bizauskas

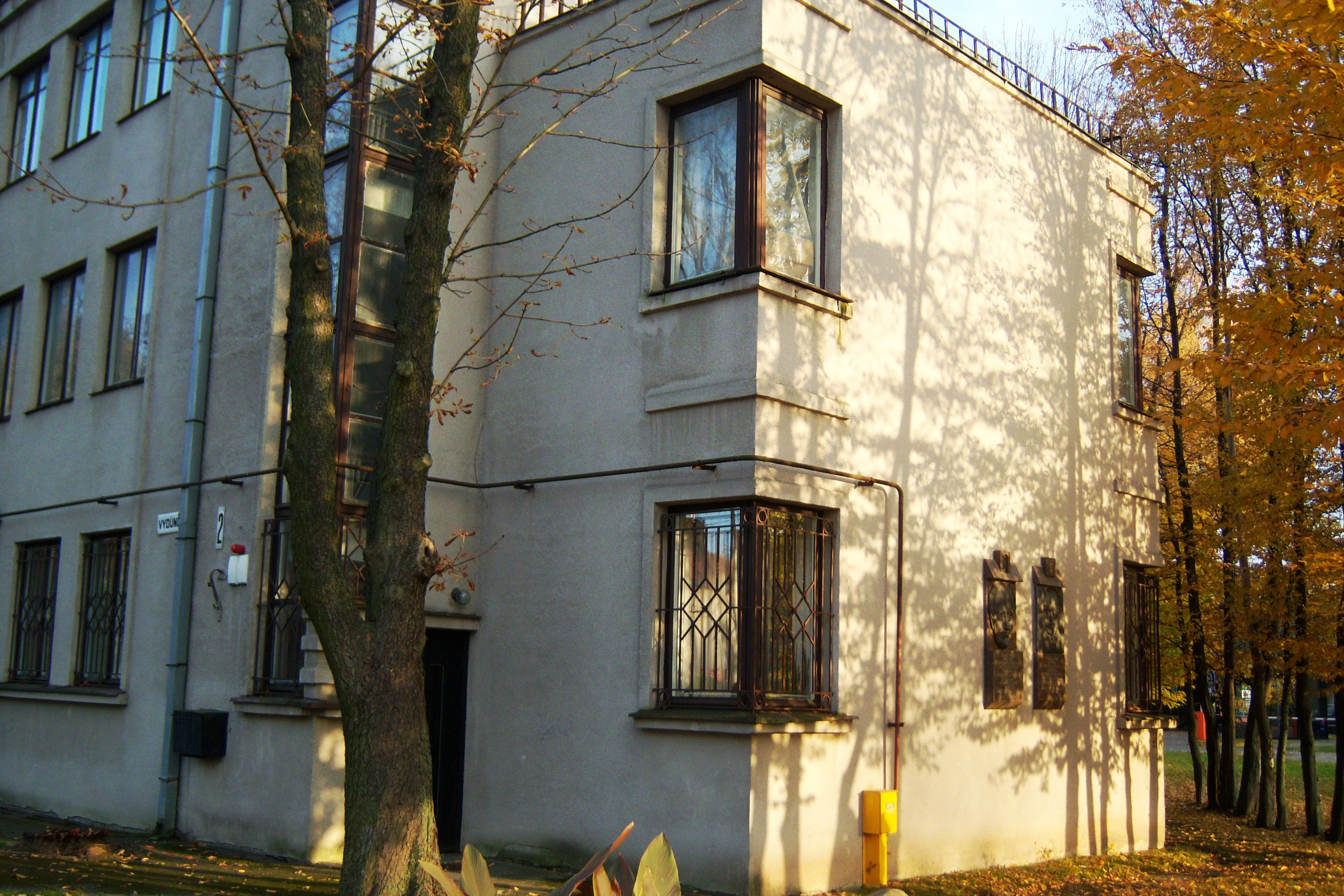
House in Kaunas where Kazys Bizauskas lived in 1933–1940

Kazys Bizauskas (14 February 1893, Pāvilosta, Courland Governorate – 26 June 1941) was a Lithuanian statesman, diplomat, author, and one of the twenty signatories of the Act of Independence of Lithuania.

Bizauskas first emerged as a writer while attending secondary school in Kaunas; he issued a hand-written periodical, Ateitis (The Future). He studied law at Moscow University from 1913 to 1915. After returning, he taught secondary school in Panevėžys. During the Conference of Vilnius he was elected to the Council of Lithuania as its secretary, and signed the Act of Independence in 1918.

In 1920 Bizauskas was elected to the Constituent Assembly as a representative of the Christian Democratic Party. During the summer of 1920 he served as secretary-general at the negotiations that led to the formalization of the Soviet-Lithuanian Treaty of 1920.

He held a number of diplomatic posts during the 1920s and 1930s, serving as Lithuanian envoy to the Vatican, the United States, the United Kingdom, Latvia, and the Netherlands. He also authored a secondary school textbook, contributed numerous articles to periodicals, and co-founded the Society of Bibliophiles and the publishing house Žinija. After the first Soviet occupation of Lithuania in 1940, he returned to his farm near Ukmergė, where he was arrested and held in prison until Nazi Germany launched the invasion of the Soviet Union on 22 June 1941.

Bizauskas was transported to a Soviet prison in Minsk in June 1941; he was shot by the NKVD along with several thousand other prisoners on 26 June 1941.

== Awards ==
- Latvia: Order of the Three Stars, 1st Class (27 Jul 1928)
