= Teodoras Daukantas =

Lithuanian military officer

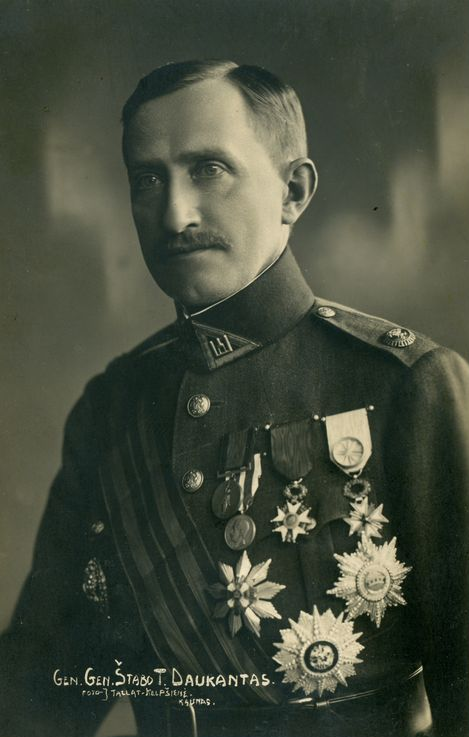
Teodoras Daukantas in 1930s

Teodoras Daukantas (September 20, 1884 in St. Petersburg, Russian Empire – March 10, 1960 in Buenos Aires, Argentina) was a Lithuanian military officer who served as Lithuanian Minister of Defense. In 1903–1918, Daukantas served in the Imperial Russian Navy. He attended Naval Training School at St. Petersburg (1903–1906). In 1911–1914, Daukantas attended High Naval Training School at St. Petersburg from which he graduated with a Silver Star in Naval Tactics Training. In 1913, he published The Defense of Abu-Alaud and in 1916, Essays on Naval Tactics. Later he published the articles "The Defense of Coasts", "The War on Rivers". He published the books The South of Brazil and Our Way to Vilnius. After World War I, Daukantas returned to Lithuania in 1922. He was head of education section of the Senior Officers Academy in Kaunas until 1924. Twice, in 1924–1925 and 1927–1928, he served as the Lithuanian Minister of Defense. In between serving as the Lithuanian Minister of Defense, he was the Chief of the General Staff of the Lithuanian Army. In his diary for 1927, American diplomat Robert Heingartner who served in Lithuania recorded that "Colonel Daukantas is said to be so powerful in the army that no government could last a day without his support." In 1928, he was promoted to brigadier general (in 1936, he was changed to lieutenant general).

He was Lithuanian Consul General in Rio de Janeiro (1932–1935) and Minister Plenipotentiary of South America (1936–1939). On October 20, 1932, Daukantas co-signed a Treaty # 3542 with Carlos Saavedra Lamas under the League of European Nations which insured a convention or treaty between the Argentine Republic and the Independent Republic of Lithuania concerning reciprocity with respect to the payment of compensation for industrial accidents signed at Buenos Aires on October 20, 1932. Daukantas was a Member of the States Council, Chargé d'Affaires for Argentina, Brazil, Paraguay, and Uruguay, (1930 -1935). In 1941 Daukantas was arrested, imprisoned, and tortured during the Soviet rule of Lithuania, and persecuted by the Nazi German Gestapo in 1942-1944 during their occupation. He was liberated at the beginning of the German invasion of the Soviet Union, moved to Germany until 1949, and then to Argentina. He remained in Buenos Aires, Argentina until his death in 1960. His remains were reburied in Karmėlava, Lithuania in 1997.

== Academic experience ==
- (1925–1930 and 1935–1940) Associate Professor of Geography, Vytautas Magnus University, Kaunas
- (1935–1937) Lecturer of Spanish Languages, Vytautas Magnus University
- (1941–1944) Associate Professor of Geography, Vilnius University, special courses on South America, the Baltic Sea and the importance of maritime for the State of Lithuania
- Lecturer on Topography and Surveying at the High Military Officers Courses, Kaunas

== Geographical voyages and travels ==
- (1906–1911) with Russian battleship Slava in North Atlantic, Arctic Sea and Mediterranean
- (1919–1922) Captain in the English and Dutch Merchant Marine
- (1924–1926) voyage to North Africa
- (1929–1930) voyage to South America (Brazil, Argentina, Paraguay)
