= Petras Klimas =

Lithuanian diplomat, historian (1891–1969)

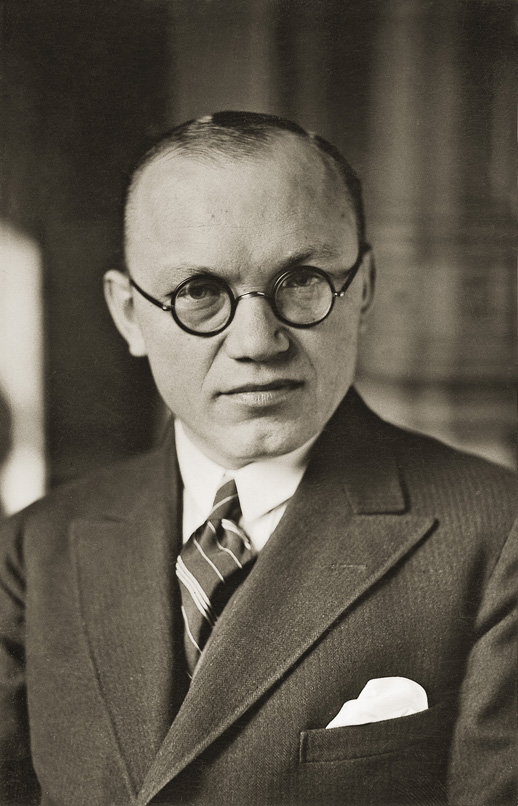
Petras Klimas

Petras Klimas (23 February 1891 - 16 January 1969) was a Lithuanian diplomat, author, historian, and one of the twenty signatories of the Act of Independence of Lithuania.

Klimas attended law school at the University of Moscow. After graduating, he returned to Vilnius and served on the Lithuanian Society for the Relief of War Sufferers. He was elected to the Council of Lithuania in 1917, and signed the Act of Independence in 1918. Klimas went on to serve as the Lithuanian diplomatic envoy to France, Belgium, Spain, Portugal, and Luxembourg.

In September 1917, Petras Klimas wrote:

Giving the right of self-determination to the inhabitants of Vilnius, a population devoid of culture, would mean giving an opportunity to agitators to fool people. The thing is to unite former branches with the old trunk. Based on that, we draw the border far beyond Vilnius, near Ašmena. Lyda County is also Lithuanian...

During the Interwar period, Klimas published a number of scholarly works in the Lithuanian and German language, including Russisch Litauen (Russian Lithuania), a study of Russian rule of Lithuania from 1795 to 1915; Der Werdegang des litauischen Staates (The Development of the Lithuanian State), describing the emergence of the Lithuanian state from 1915 to 1918; and Lietuvos žemės valdymo istorija (History of land ownership in Lithuania).

While he was serving on a diplomatic mission to Paris in 1940, the Lithuanian Legation was turned over to the Soviet Union. The Nazi occupational authorities in France arrested him in 1942, and he was sent to a concentration camp until 1943. He was released for a short while and returned to Lithuania, but was re-arrested in 1944 during the second Soviet occupation of Lithuania. This time, he was sent to a concentration camp in Siberia and spent ten years there. His health was permanently impaired until his death in 1969. He was buried in Petrašiūnai Cemetery.

== Sources ==
- Borzecki, Jerzy (2008). The Soviet-Polish Peace of 1921 and the creation of interwar Europe. Yale University Press.
- "Klimas, Petras". Encyclopedia Lituanica III: 142–143. (1970–1978). Ed. Simas Sužiedėlis. Boston, Massachusetts: Juozas Kapočius. LCCN 74-114275.
