= Jurgis Šaulys =

Lithuanian economist, diplomat and politician

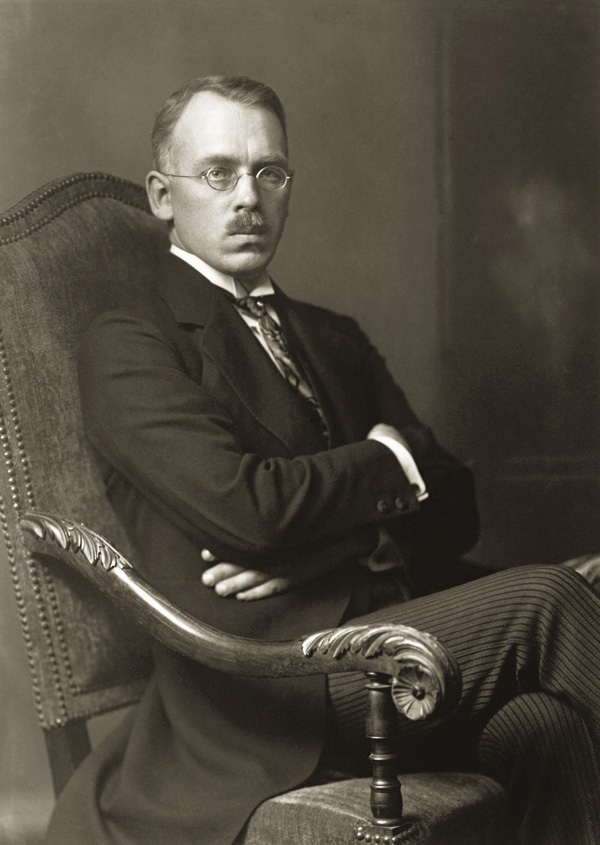

1st Vice Chairman of the Council of Lithuania
- In office 16 February 1918 – 15 November 1919
- Preceded by: Office established
- Succeeded by: Justinas Staugaitis

Personal details
- Born: 5 May 1879 Balsėnai, Kovno Governorate, Russian Empire
- Died: 18 October 1948 (aged 69) Lugano, Switzerland
- Party: Lithuanian Democratic Party (1902–1920)
- Spouse(s): Kazimiera Celinska-Šaulienė (m. 1919; div. 1933) Mafalda Salvatini (m. 1933; died 1948)
- Children: 1
- Education: Vilnius St. Joseph Seminary (expelled); Bern University

Jurgis Šaulys (Lithuanian pronunciation: [ˈjʊrɡʲɪs ʃauˈlʲîːs]; 5 May 1879–18 October 1948) was a Lithuanian economist, diplomat, and politician, and one of the twenty signatories to the 1918 Act of Independence of Lithuania.

Šaulys attended Palanga Progymnasium and Vilnius St. Joseph Seminary. He was dismissed from the seminary for participating in the Knygnešiai movement, which disseminated materials published in the Lithuanian language, a practice outlawed at the time. After moving to Vilnius in 1900, he continued his political activities; he became one of the Twelve Apostles of Vilnius of the independence movement, and was one of the founders of the Lithuanian Democratic Party. He left for Switzerland to study economics at the University of Bern, receiving his doctorate in 1912, but still contributed to these activities while abroad.

Returning to Vilnius in 1912, he edited the Lietuvos žinios (Lithuanian News). After World War I broke out he served various charitable organizations. He was a member of the Vilnius Conference and was elected Secretary-General of the ensuing Council of Lithuania and later the Vice Chairman. Šaulys signed the Act of Independence on February 16, 1918.

Šaulys went into the diplomatic service immediately afterwards, serving as an envoy to Germany, Switzerland, the Vatican, and Poland. In the wake of the German invasion of Poland in 1939, he moved to Lugano in Switzerland with his wife, the Italian opera singer Mafalda Salvatini, acting as the Lithuanian ambassador in Berne until the legation was closed in 1946. He died in Lugano two years later.

A dedicated bibliophile, he donated much of his collection to the Vytautas Magnus University; the remainder of his collection is held at the University of Pennsylvania.
