= Belarus in the Russian Empire =

The Belarusian history within the Russian Empire is associated with the history of Belarus from the Partitions of the Polish–Lithuanian Commonwealth to the October Revolution when the present-day Belarus' lands were made part of the Russian Empire.

== Territorial growth ==
The First Partition of Poland (1772) awarded only some parts of the Belarusian lands, northern part of the Polotsk Voivodeship, entire Mstsislaw Voivodeship and Vitebsk Voivodeship, and southeastern part of the Minsk Voivodeship, which became parts of the Pskov and the Mogilev guberniyas (governorates).

In 1776, the Polotsk Governorate was created after separating from the original Russian lands of the Pskov Governorate.

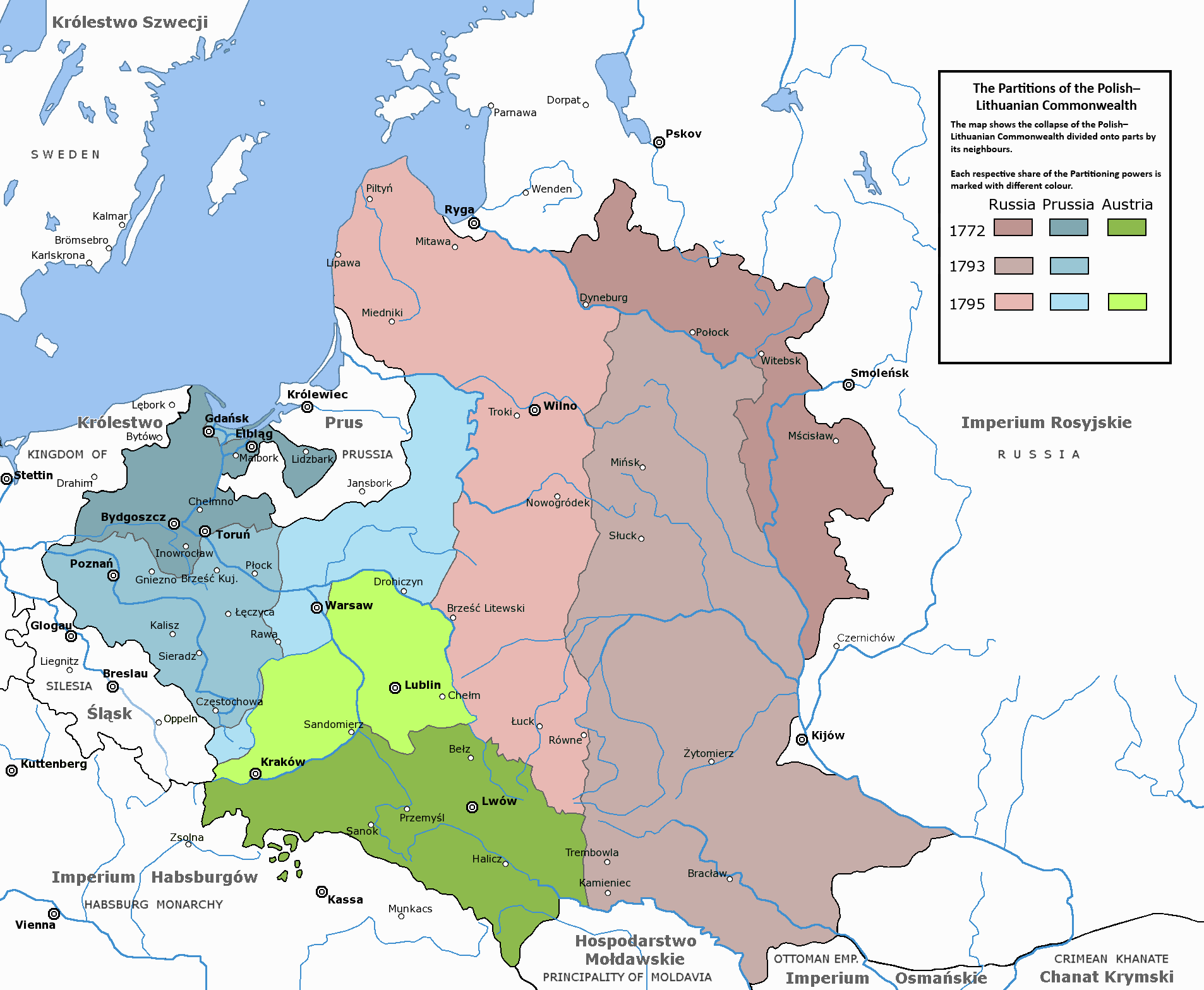
Three partitions of Poland

The second partition (1793) added more (the remaining part of Minsk Voivodeship, Bracław Voivodeship and Vilnius Voivodeship and Brest Litovsk Voivodeship). After the third partition virtually all Belarusian lands were within the Russian Empire, and the Belarusian guberniyas eventually constituted part of the Northwestern Krai.

== Russo-Polish power struggle ==
Initially, most of the Polish feudal system was retained in Belarusian lands, the polonized Litvin Catholic Szlachta dominated the territories, whilst most of the Ruthenian population was peasantry. Unlike the strong nationalist drive seen in Right-bank Ukraine, a legacy of the Cossacks following the partitions, most of the Belarusian lands remained inert in terms of changes.

Polish nationalism sparked the rise of Belarusian self-identity. In 1830, the szlachta, began the November Uprising and after its failure, Nicholas I began a systematic policy of cracking down on Polish influence in the lands of modern Belarus that were claimed by Russian tsars as White Russia. First the ruling class was removed, and the Belarusian Greek Catholic Church, at the Synod of Polotsk reverted to Eastern Orthodoxy under the leadership of Joseph Semashko in 1839.

Meanwhile, since the mid-1830s, ethnographic works about Belarus began to appear, the tentative attempts to study the language were taken up (e.g., Belarusian grammar by Shpilevskiy). The Belarusian literary tradition began to re-form, basing on the folk language instead of the written Ruthenian, initiated by the works of Vintsent Dunin-Martsinkyevich, Jan Czeczot, Jan Barszczewski and others. Still, a large part of the literature had to hide itself behind the labels of "Polish" or sometimes even "Bulgarian", because Russian censorship did not tolerate the Belarusian national movement up until the Revolution of 1905.

In the beginning of the 1860s, both pro-Russian and pro-Polish parties in the Belarusian lands had begun to realise that the decisive role in the upcoming conflicts was shifting to the peasantry. So, a large amount of propaganda appeared, targeted at the peasantry and published in the Belarusian language. One notable example was the anti-Russian, anti-Tsarist newspaper Mużyckaja prauda (Peasants' Truth) (1862–1863) by Konstanty Kalinowski.

== Industrialisation & rise of Belarusian nationality ==
The 1860s marked a turning point of Belarus in the Russian Empire. The emancipation of the serfs in 1861, followed by the January Uprising fully left the Polish influence on Belarus behind. A number of authors started publishing in the Belarusian language, including Jan Czeczot, Władysław Syrokomla and Konstanty Kalinowski. What followed was the Industrial Revolution under Alexander III and with it the arrival of the railways Peasants sought a better lot in growing industrial centres in Belarus and a further 1.5 million people leaving to other parts of the Empire in the half-century preceding the Russian Revolution of 1917.

During this time the Russification of Belarusian culture brought to the results that in the 1897 Russian Empire Census, about 5.89 million people declared themselves speakers of Belarusian language rather than Litvin or Ruthenian, as they did under Polish rule. The Belarusian nobility and middle class had a firm footing in the regions and Stolypin's reforms allowed the peasants standard of living to greatly increase. However at the same time, many rising Belarusian nationalists, were fearing that the growth of the Russian influence on their culture, and as a result played a decisive role in the 1905 Revolution afterwards Nicholas II officially recognised Belarusian language as independent and allowed its teachings.

== Aftermath ==
During World War I Belarus was caught in the front lines. The Russian Revolution of 1917 and dissolution of the Russian Empire as well as loyalty of the Germans enabled Belarusians, to establish in 1918 an independent state, the Belarusian People's Republic. However, by 1919 Bolsheviks took control over Belarus and forced the country's democratic government into exile.

Today the period of Belarus in Russian Empire is viewed with some controversy. On one side, many recognise that the period enabled the Litvin and Ruthenian identity to transform into a modern Belarusian nationality. On the other, in doing so, many traits, though coming via Poland of the Belarusian culture were lost under Tsarist pressure.

== See also ==
- Russification of Belarus
- Belarusian People's Republic
- Battle of Klyastitsy
- Krupki
- Polish language
- Jews
- Lenin
- Ukrainian People's Republic
- White Ruthenia
