= Mužyckaja prauda =

Belarusian language newspaper

- The second edition of Mužyckaja prauda, 1862
- Type: Newspaper
- Founder: Konstanty Kalinowski
- Founded: 1862

Mužyckaja prauda (Peasants' Truth or Folk's Truth) was the first Belarusian language newspaper printed in 1862-1863 by a collective led by a revolutionary Kastuś Kalinoŭski in the Belarusian Latin alphabet in a form of letters. Seven issues were printed, all under a pseudonym "Jaśko haspadar z pad Wilni" ("Jaśko, landowner from near Vilna" or "Jaśko, yeoman from near Vilna"). The newspaper was called illegal, revolutionary, "clandestine antitsarist newspaper", and manifesto.

== Background ==
Konstanty Kalinowski was born in Mastaŭliany, in Grodnensky Uyezd of the Russian Empire (now Mostowlany, Poland) to a szlachta family. After graduating from a local school in Świsłocz in 1855, Kalinowski entered the faculty of Medicine of the University of Moscow. After one semester he moved to St. Petersburg, where his brother was and joined the faculty of Law at the University of St. Petersburg. Along with his brother Victor, he got himself involved in Polish students' conspiracies and secret cultural societies, headed by Zygmunt Sierakowski and Jarosław Dąbrowski. After graduating in 1860, Konstanty traveled to Vilnius where he unsuccessfully applied to join the civil service.

== History ==
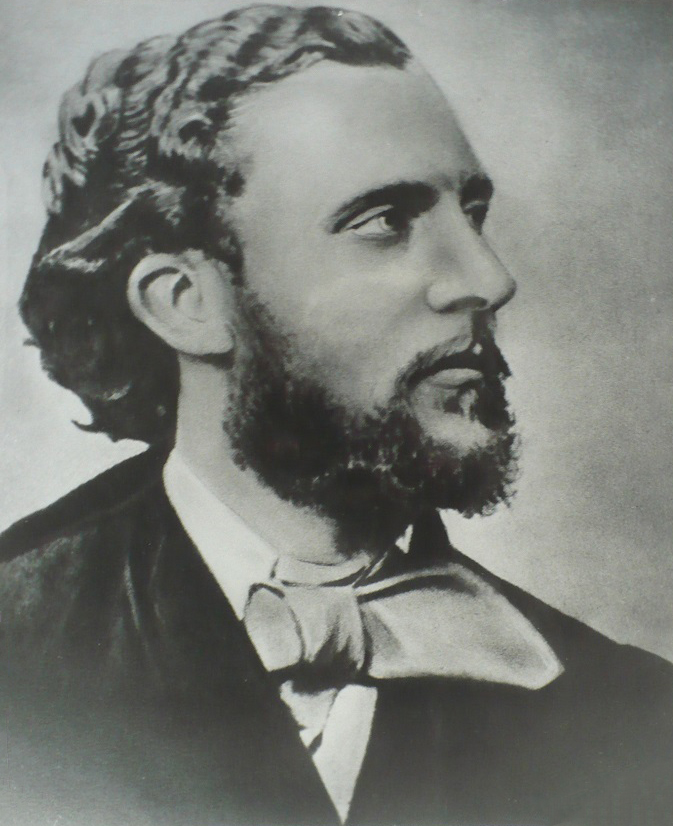
Walery Wróblewski

After being refused a place in civil service, Kalinowski organized a movement for the liberation of his country. As a preparation for the uprising, he began issuing the first newspaper in the modern Belarusian language, Mužyckaja Praūda (Peasants' Truth), under a pseudonym "Jaśko haspadar z pad Wilni" ("Jaśko, landowner from near Vilna" or "Jaśko, yeoman from near Vilna"). He worked on this newspaper together with forestry officer Walery Wróblewski, who was a link between the revolutionary movements in Grodno and Białystok, geometer Feliks Różański, duty officer Stanisław Songin, and Bronisław Szwarce. The exact place were the newspaper was printed is unknown, though it was probably printed in various cities, most likely in Białystok, Grodno and Vilnius. Pisarski claimed that it was printed in Minsk.

The first issue was probably published in June 1862, the second in early September 1862, issues 3, 4, and 5 in the period leading up to January 1863, issue 6 at the beginning of 1863, and issue 7 in the spring of 1863. June is the assumed date of publication because the Grodno governor, Ivan Haller, wrote on September 17, 1862, to the Russian minister that issue one of this newspaper "... is in circulation among peasants for about two months, and the other for about two weeks". There were also unnumbered copies of Mużyckaja prauda in circulation.

Revolutionaries distributed issues of the Mużyckaja prauda themselves in the regions of Grodno and Białystok. Most notably, Wróblewski himself would scatter copies of the paper through these villages come nightfall on horseback. The audience were peasants ("to whom he promised land in their own language") and believers of the Uniate Church (abolished by the authorities in 1839).

Historian Leo Garoshka described the newspaper and authorities' response:

The greatest part of Mužyckaja Praūda is devoted to unveiling the true facts about the plundering of the villages by the Tsarist authorities. The sixth issue is completely consecrated to the defence of the old Byelorussian Uniate faith. Mužyckaja Praūda proved to be very popular among the people and consequently attracted the full fury of the Tsarist regime. The Imperial authorities were aware of the preparations for an uprising, and in order to forestall it they drafted a levy of recruits for the army in October 1862. The youth of military age at once began to take to the woods and form bands, so hastening the outbreak of the uprising.

Printing and distributing of the newspaper was prosecuted. The Grodno governor informed on August 10, 1862, that the peasants of the village Jasieniówki, Podbórze and Radowieze of the Brest region found four copies of the first issue of the newspaper. The ministry ordered a vigorous investigation to be launched. The governor of Grodno reported to the minister of internal affairs on 17 September 1962 that "... inflammatory letters appeared almost exclusively in the poviats of the Grodno governorate located on the border of the Kingdom of Poland." At least one man, 44 year old peasant Maciej Tiuchnia, was executed for the dissemination of the illegal newspaper, another one, 26 year old former student of St. Petersburg university Josef Gorczak, was sent to katorga.

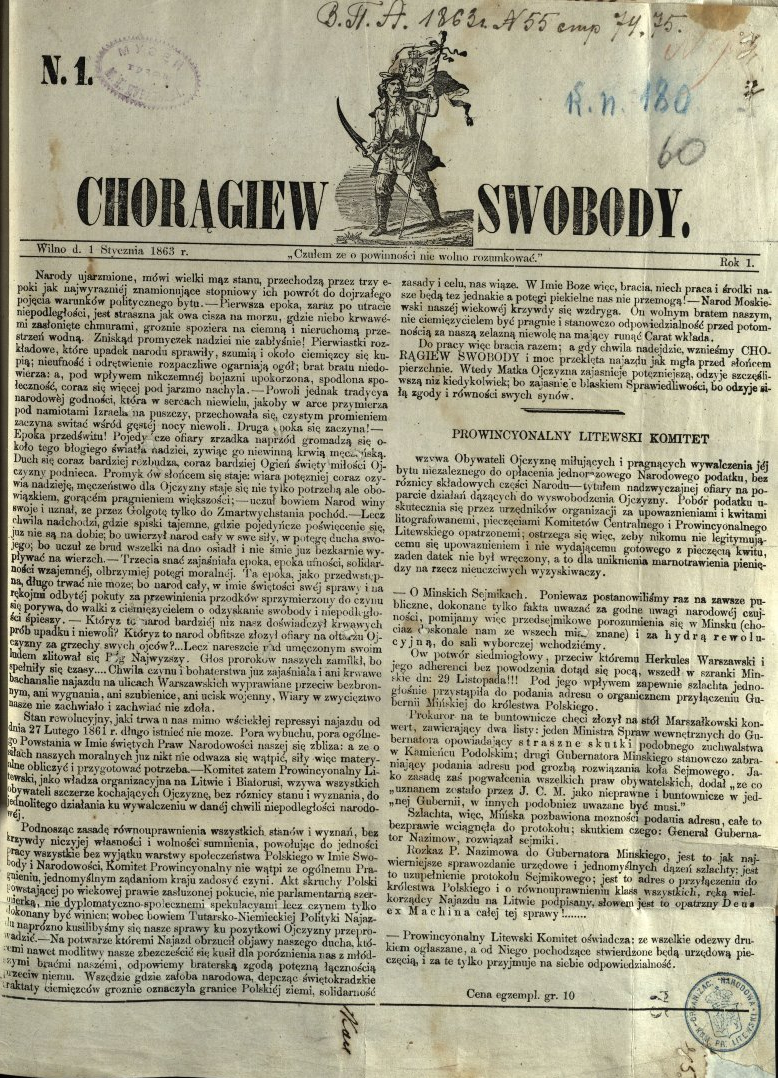
Chorągiew Swobody, issue 1

Two illegal Polish language were also printed either by Kalinowski or under his approval or patronage, The Flag of Freedom (Chorągiew Swobody) and The Voice of Litva (Głos z Litwy). The intended audience of both these newspapers was nobility; both also lack any "contentious social slogans slogans that emanated out of the periodical Mužyckaja Praŭda". Three issues of The Flag of Freedom were published.

According to historian Dorota Michaluk, "The programme of the Reds was formulated in the Chorągiew Swobody newspaper as follows: restoration of the Polish-Lithuanian Commonwealth to its state independence within the borders from 1772, enfranchisement, democratisation of societal principles, the abolition of the tsarist regime by military action, solidarity between all social groups and an alliance with the Russian democrats."

January uprising broke out on 23 January 1863. The last issue of the newspaper was printed during the uprising. When it was suppressed, Kalinowski was arrested and imprisoned in Vilnius; he wrote there his Letter from Beneath the Gallows (Pismo z-pad szybienicy). He was tried by a court-martial for leading the revolt against Russia and sentenced to death. On 22 March 1864, at the age 26, Kastus Kalinowski was publicly executed on Lukiškės Square in Vilnius.

== Themes ==
Historian Zita Medišauskienė wrote that Belarusian press of the uprising time contain very few religious motives; its main themes were social injustice and oppression by the Russian Empire. She also highlighted that the propagandist press of that time was "highly persuasive".

"[in press] ...social issues being the main focus. The social injustice imposed by the Russian government on Belarusian peasants was especially highlighted: high taxes, conscription, the prohibition on moving to another landlord (this freedom was a reality during the period of the Polish-Lithuanian Commonwealth), the unlawful and unfair actions of civil servants, and the Emancipation of 1861, which failed to meet the expectations of the peasants. The abolition of the Uniate Church and the "true" Uniate faith was reported alongside the illicit actions of the imperial Russian regime. The repression of the Catholic Church was occasionally mentioned too.

Mužyckaja prauda (Peasant's truth), published in Belarusian, omitted the wrongdoings inflicted on the Catholic Church altogether; it mentioned the abolition of the union in the sixth issue, and that after detailing various other acts of wrongdoing committed by the imperial government. However, this was done in an especially persuasive way. The faith of the ancestors, the Uniate faith, the gazette asserted, is the true religion, while the Orthodoxy imposed by the tsar is false. A follower "will die like a dog and suffer in Hell after death". God will punish those who abandon the true faith, "send them to Hell for eternal suffering, devils will tear the soul into pieces, and tar will boil in your guts. You will then learn about your fate; but once in Hell, it will be too late; you will not win over the righteous God, and your suffering will be everlasting". In this issue, then, Belarusian peasants were invited to fight for freedom, which also meant the freedom to profess their religion.

She concluded, that "freedom was the ultimate value promoted in Belarusian texts. It was understood as personal freedom and freedom of conscience; but, more importantly, it was also understood as social freedom and the right to own land. In general, social issues predominated in the Belarusian uprising press. This situation could have been partly due to the fact that Kalinoŭski was the author or editor of most of the publications."

In issue six, Kalinowski wrote that the Tsar, "bribing many Popes, told us to enter the schism, he paid money so that we could only convert to Orthodoxy, and like this Antichrist he took our righteous Uniate faith from us and he lost us to God on centuries."

In an Oxford-published book A History of Modern Political Thought in East Central Europe, authors wrote that Kalinowski's texts "contrasted an idealized image of the ancient self-governing peasant communities to the subsequent periods of feudal oppression, and fused the programs of social and national liberation, deploring the Russian "yoke" but also describing the Polish pan (lord) as the enemy of the common folk."

Kalinoūski wrote in the third issue of Mužyckaja Praūda: "We have nothing to expect from anyone, for only he who sows can reap. So, my friends, when the time comes, let us sow with full hands, not sparing any labour so that the peasant may be free, as men are the whole world over. God will help us!" Historian Dawid Fajnhauz wrote that "the task of Mużyckaja prauda was ... to strip the peasantry of the illusion of a good tsar and the capture of the village for Polish revolutionary movement".

Fajnhauz wrote about the importance of the newspaper:

I must admit that Mużyckaja Prauda was touched by a lot issues, putting forward probably for the first time in a letter intended for peasants in a decisive manner postulates in their importance, it stands out from other revolutionary newspapers of that period. In order to learn about the ideology of the left wing of the "red", Mużyckaja Prauda is a document of unquestionable value.

== Authorship and language analysis ==
Though the paper was written by a collective, researchers identified Kalinowski as the main author. Linguist Nina Barszczewska analyzed the language of newspaper, and wrote in detail about unique features observed there:

Mużyckaja Prauda, published in the Latin alphabet in 1862–1863 and edited mainly by Kastuś Kalinoŭski – only the 7th issue of the newspaper is completely different from the previous ones. The language of the six issues of Mużyckaja Prauda and Letters Under the Gallow by K. Kalinoŭski corresponds to the Hrodna dialects. The following features appear in them: akanne, which is variously realized in stressed syllables preceded by unstressed syllables and stressed syllables followed by unstressed syllables – it appears before the word stress in 94.8% (addaci, Kaściuszku, Maskale, padatki, sakiery and swoju, zlitowania), after hissing consonants and p, dominated by lexemes with preserved e (czeho, piereprosisz), but an a appears sporadically as well (czaławiekowi, zaprahaje); in the last stressed syllable followed by an unstressed syllable о is preserved (aszukaństwo, Jaśko, widno), but in the 7th issue of the newspaper okanne prevails in 99% (bohatyi, pobor, oddać), with akanne in the remaining 1% of cases (adzin, hramada, polskamu); yakanne, which appears in Mużyckaja Prauda sporadically (dziaciuki mixed with dzieciuki, dziarżem sia) and much more often in letters, where the forms of yakanne in comparison with the forms of yekanne appear in the 2:1 ratio (biaz sudu, ciapier, jana, siabie, wajawaci / jeny, niechaj, pierojdzie); tsekanne and dzekanne (dalacieła, dziwowaci sia); lack of consonant prolonging in the intervocalic position (poustanie, sumlenie); the replacement of the f phoneme with the п, хв phonemes (Prancuz, manichwest); the -ць / -ці infinitive if the stem ends with a vowel (hawaryć, hłumić and pałażyci, rabici), only in the 7th issue of Mużyckaja Prauda there are verb forms in which a labial consonant is followed by a ы > у transition (adbuwali, nie buło); the verb of the I conjugation in the 3rd person singular with the -ць ending, optionally using forms without a -ць (budzić / budzie); personal forms of reflexive verbs with the -сь postfix (dobiliś, kłanialiś). Interesting results are obtained by comparing the language of Mużyckaja Prauda and Letters Under the Gallow with the dialect of the Mastavlyany village, where K. Kalinoŭski was born. It also exhibits a similar linguistic randomness. This is an additional argument which indicates that K. Kalinoŭski was the author or editor of Mużyckaja Prauda (No. 1–6), considering the changes that have occurred in the dialect for more than 150 years since the first publication of the newspaper.

It was noted that "Kalinowski's language is rich in colloquial Belorussian features, including p, xi, for nonnative f (Prancuz ["French"], manixt'est manifest ["manifesto"]), akane, affrication of *t', d', and north- west dialectalism." The language of Kalinowski's texts didn't have a significant influence on the shaping of modern Belarusian literary language in the beginning of the 20th century.

Full text of the newspaper was first published in Soviet Union in 1928, in S. Agurski's Ocherki po istorii revolutsionnogo dvizheniya v Belorussii, 1863-1917.

== Gallery ==
All seven issues of the newspaper

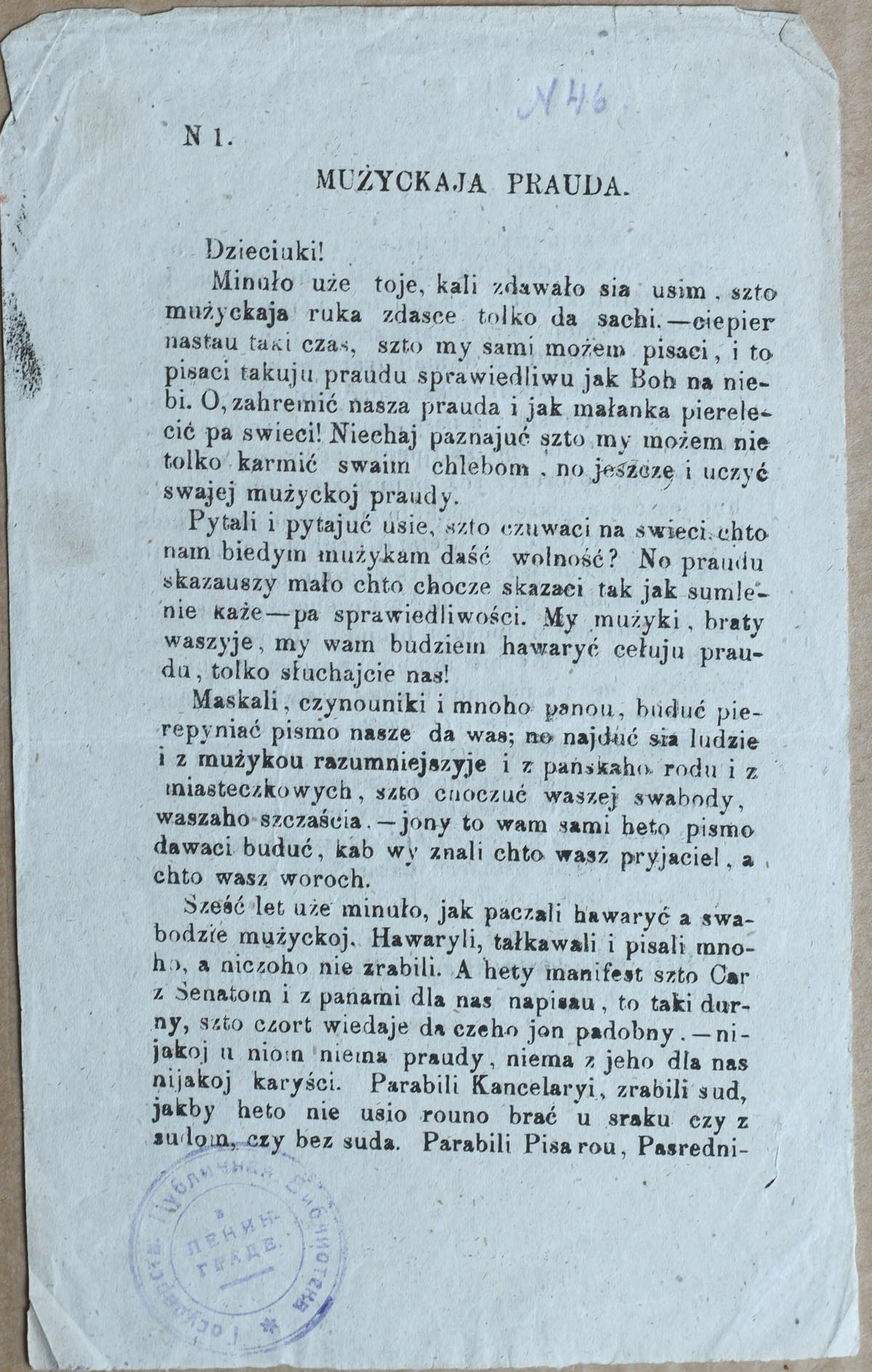
Issue 1, page 1

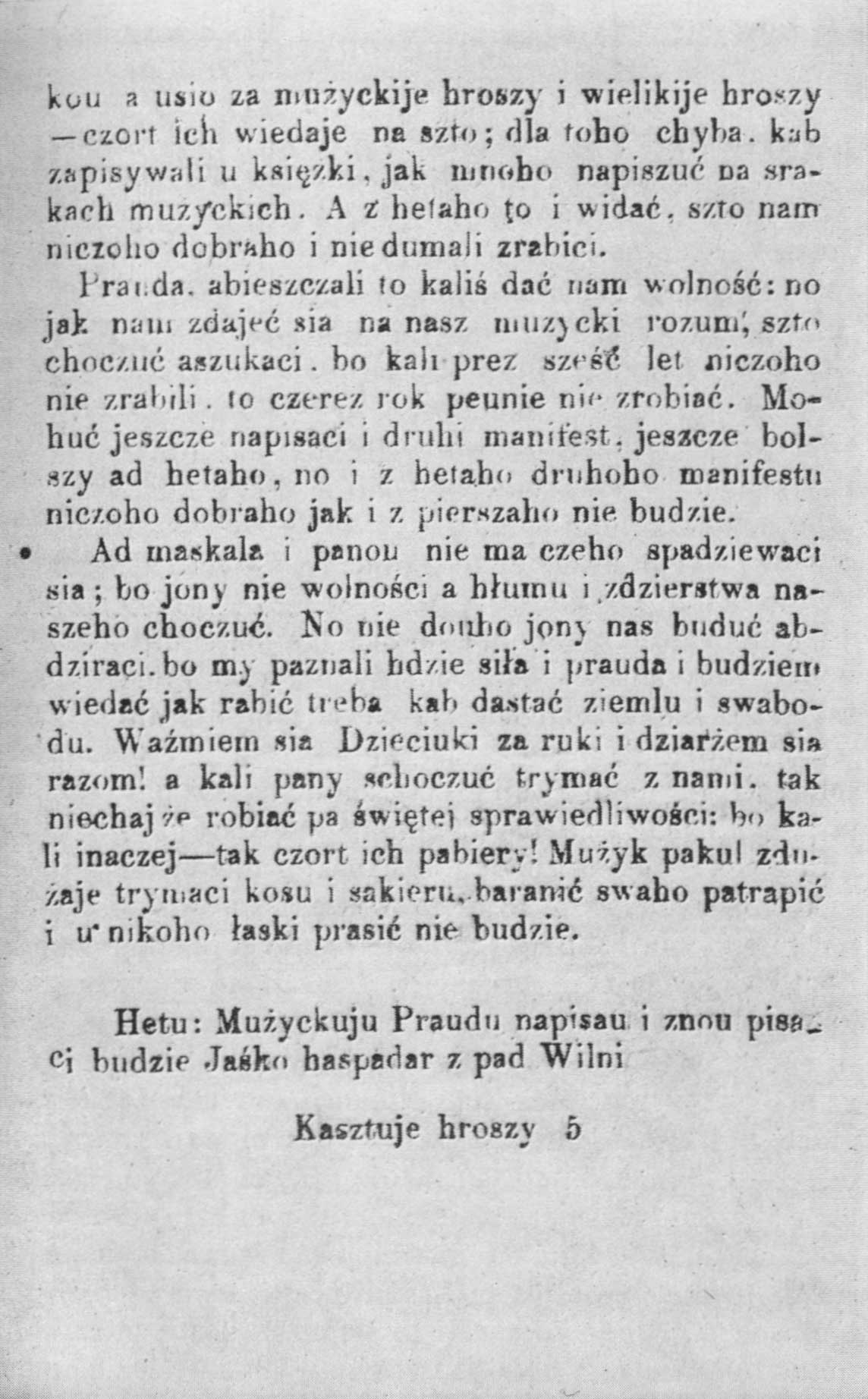
Issue 1, page 2

Issue 2, page 1

Issue 2, page 2

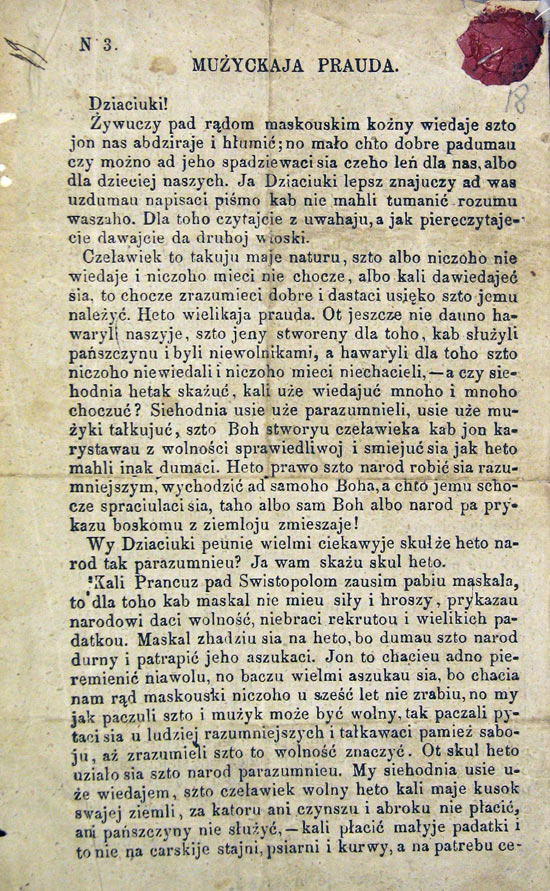
Issue 3, page 1

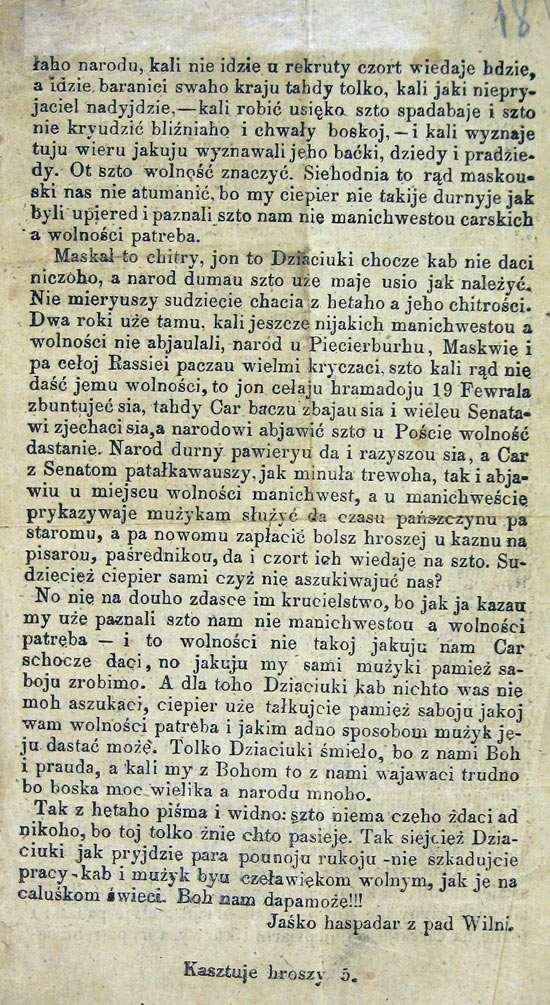
Issue 3, page 2

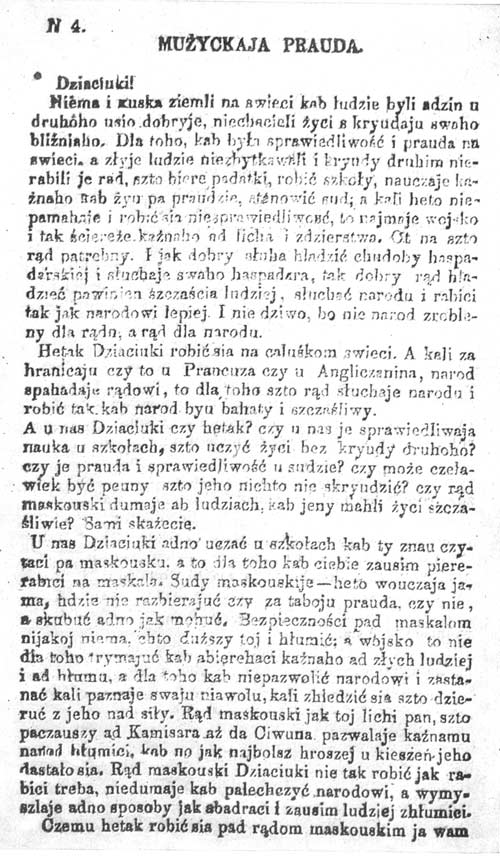
Issue 4, page 1

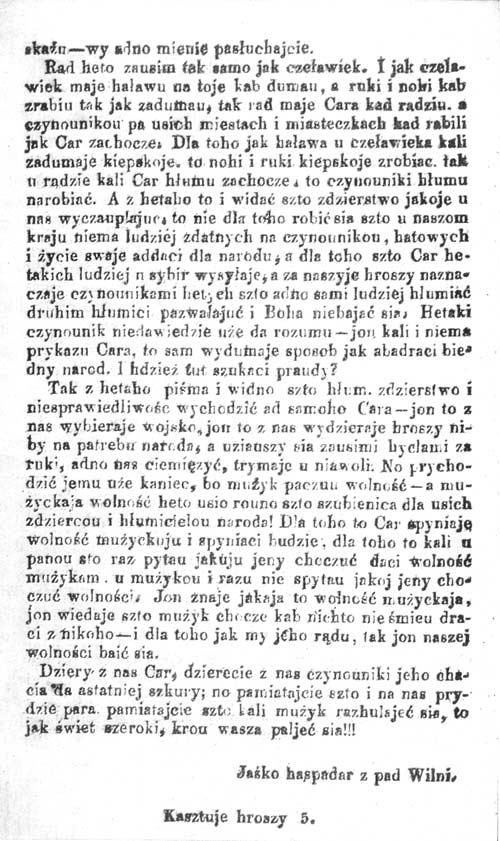
Issue 4, page 2

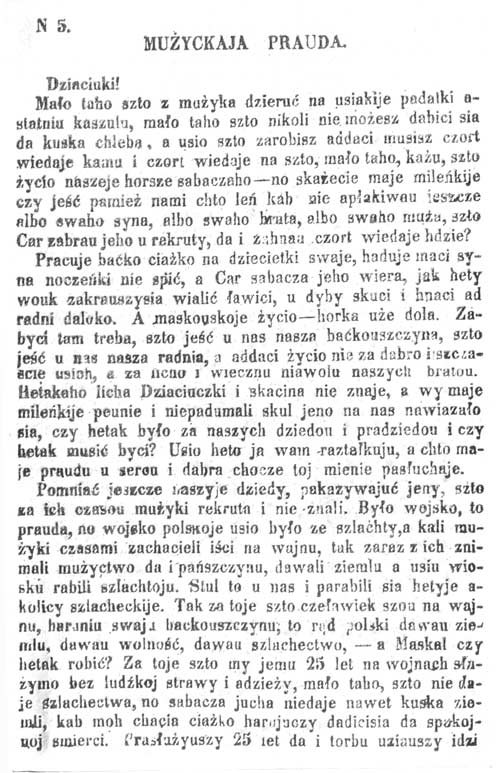
Issue 5, page 1

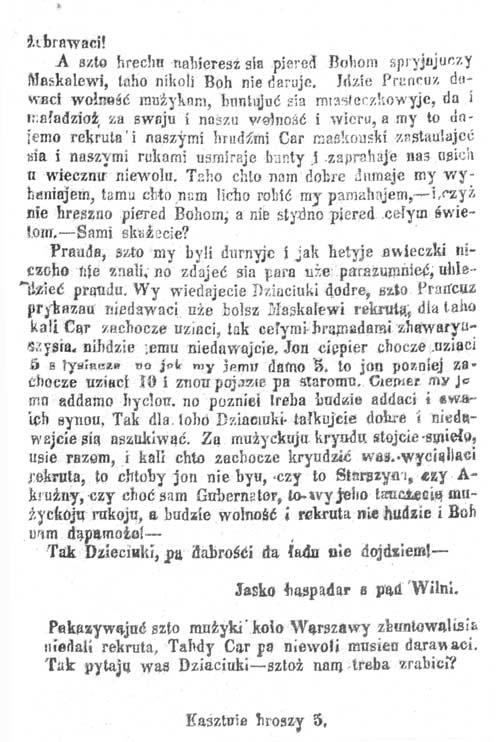
Issue 5, page 2

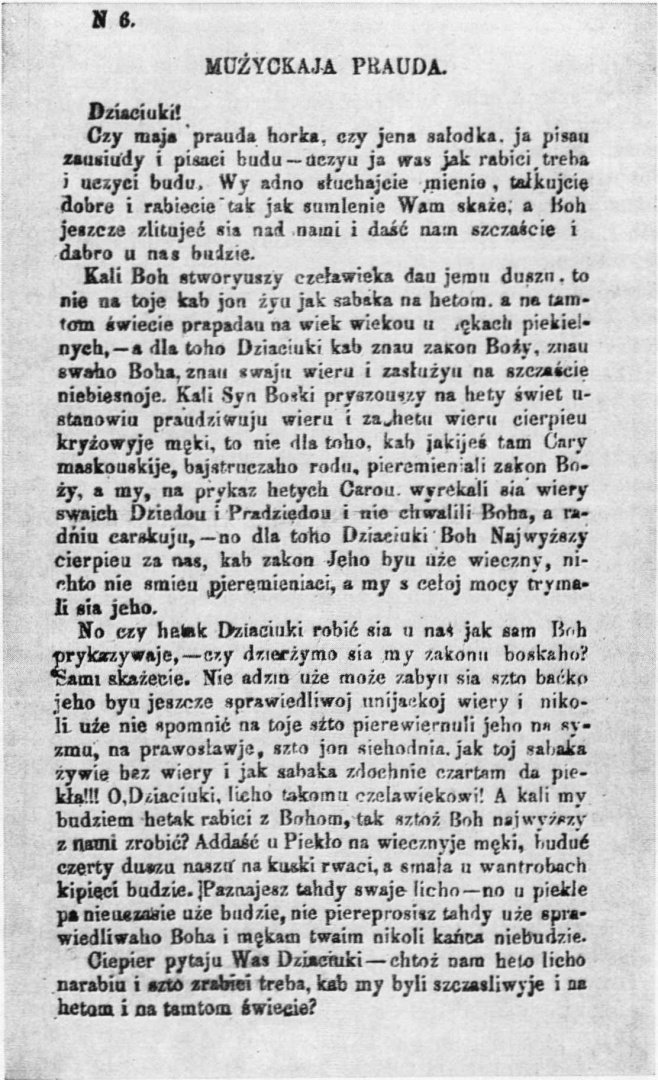
Issue 6, page 1

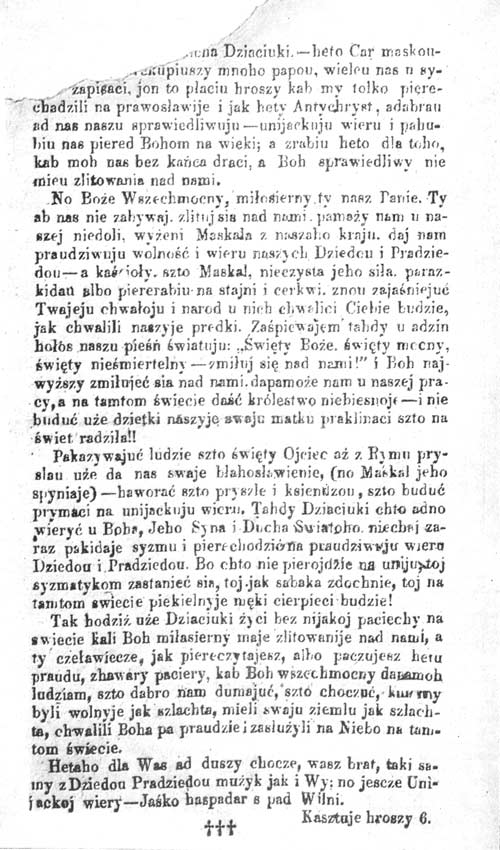
Issue 6, page 2

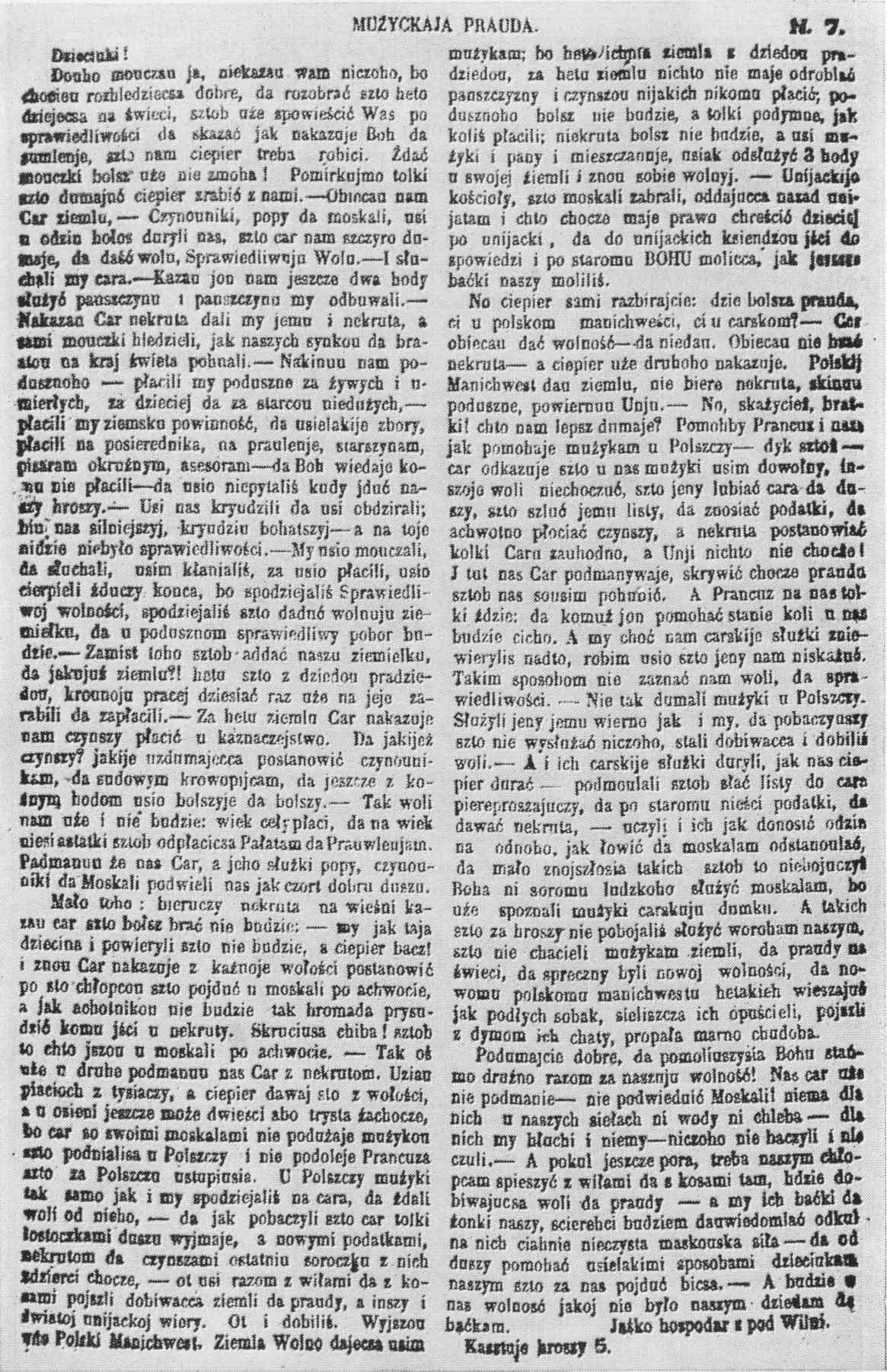
Issue 7

== Pismo ad Jaska Haspadara s pad Wilni ==
Pismo ad Jaska Haspadara s pad Wilni da mużykow Ziemli Polskoj (Letter from Jaska yeoman from near Vilna to peasants of the Polish land) was printed by Agaton Giller in Historja powstania narodu polskiego w 1861-1864 r. T. 1, 1867, who dated it as 1862 or 1864. Their authorship is disputed. Giller claimed that Kalinowski was the author, though it is probably based only on the pseudonym "Jaska haspadar s pad Wilni" used by Kalinowski. Fajnhauz noted that there is no significant difference between the themes raised in the letter and in the seventh issue of Muzyckaja prauda.

Belarusian researcher Adam Stankievich argues that Kalinowski couldn't call to the people with the words "We, who eat Polish bread, who live on the Polish land, we are Poles from the beginning of time". Another argument, supported by Michas Bic and Fajnhauz, is that the Letter has a National Government stamp, that was unusual for Kalinowski's newspaper. Another researcher, Henadz Kisialiou, believes that kalinowski was the author; he called the Letter "an example of how difficult it was to Belarusian Idea to carve its way".

Pismo ad Jaska Haspadara s pad Wilni

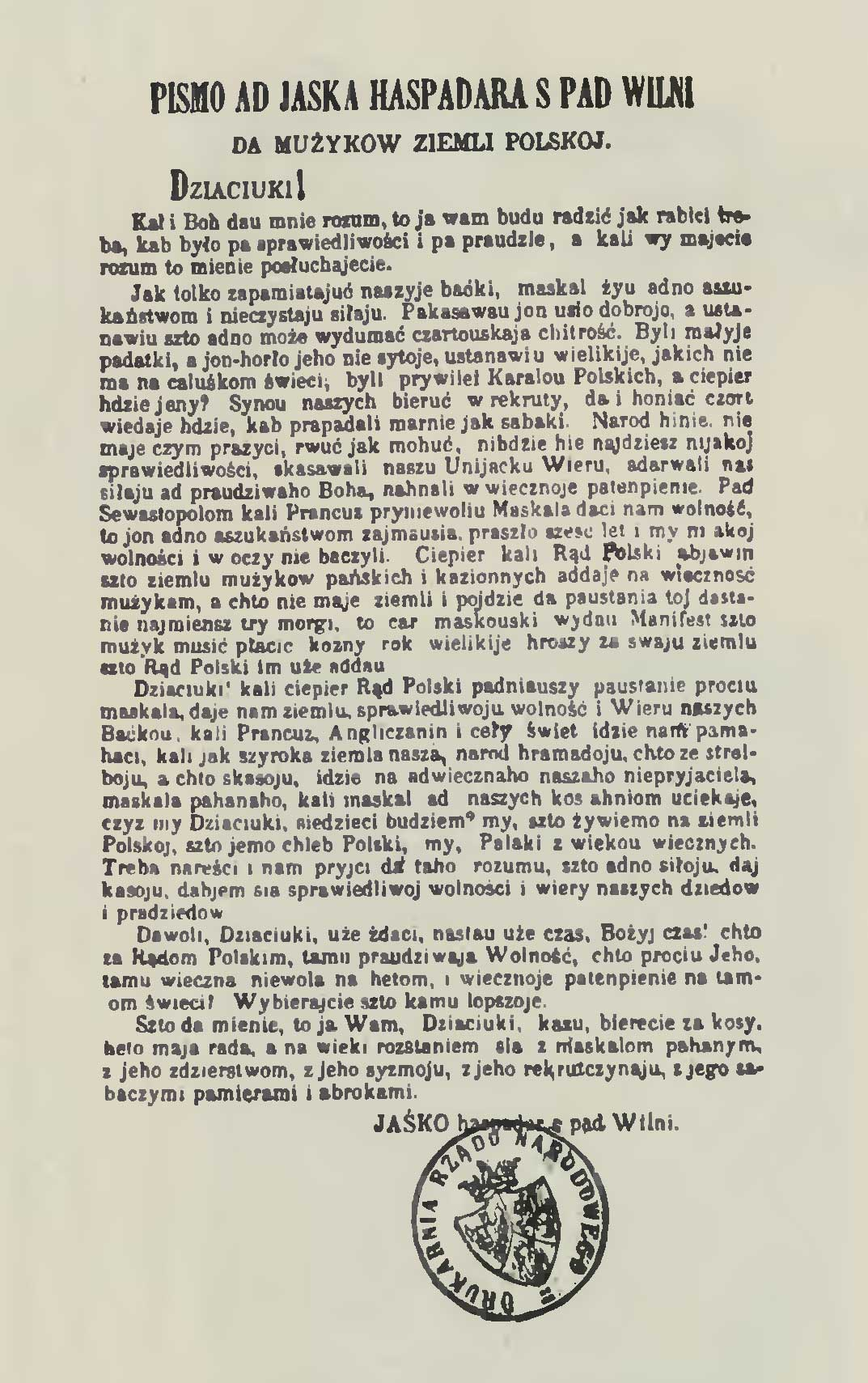
Pismo

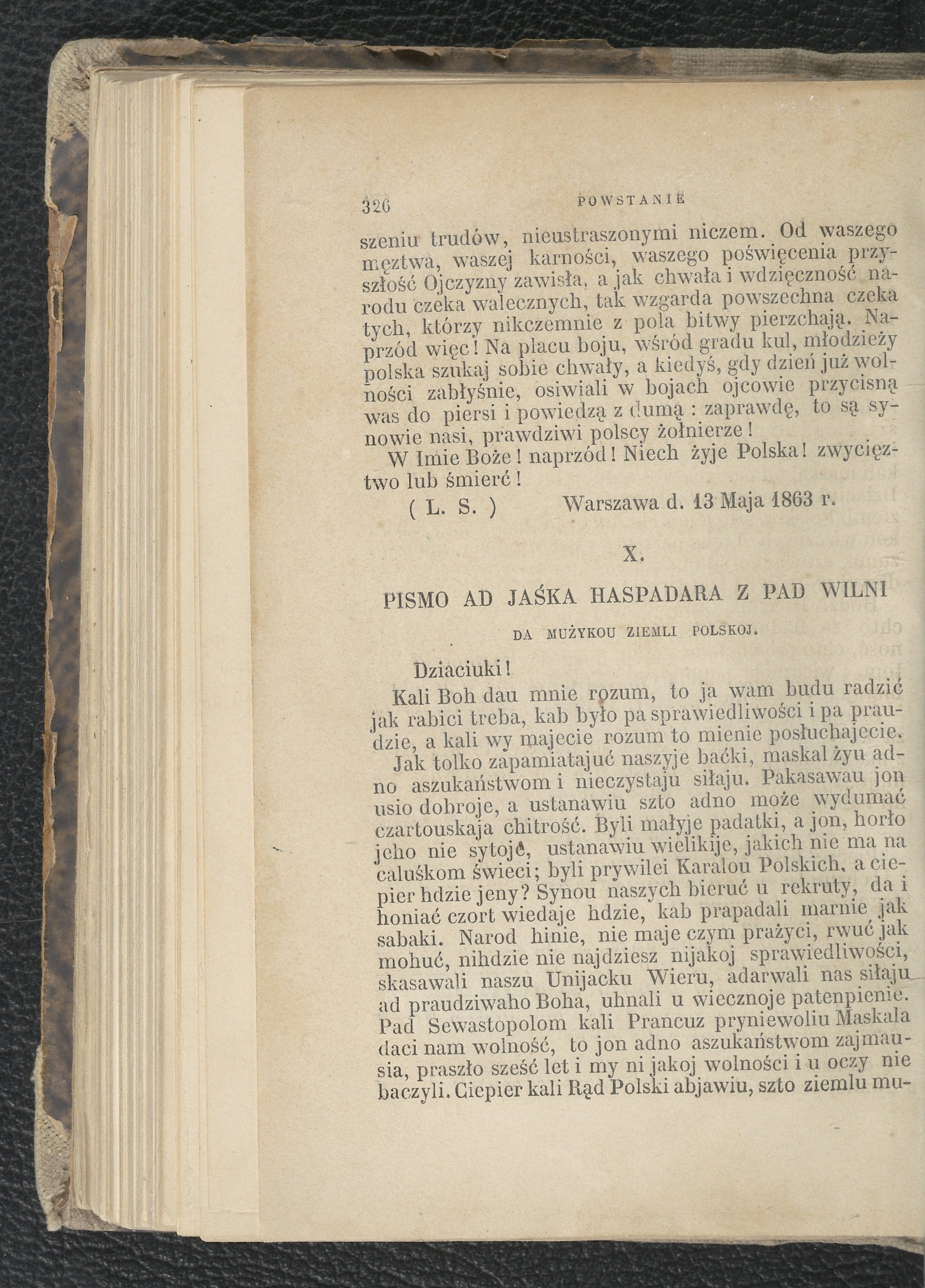
Pismo from Agaton Giller's book

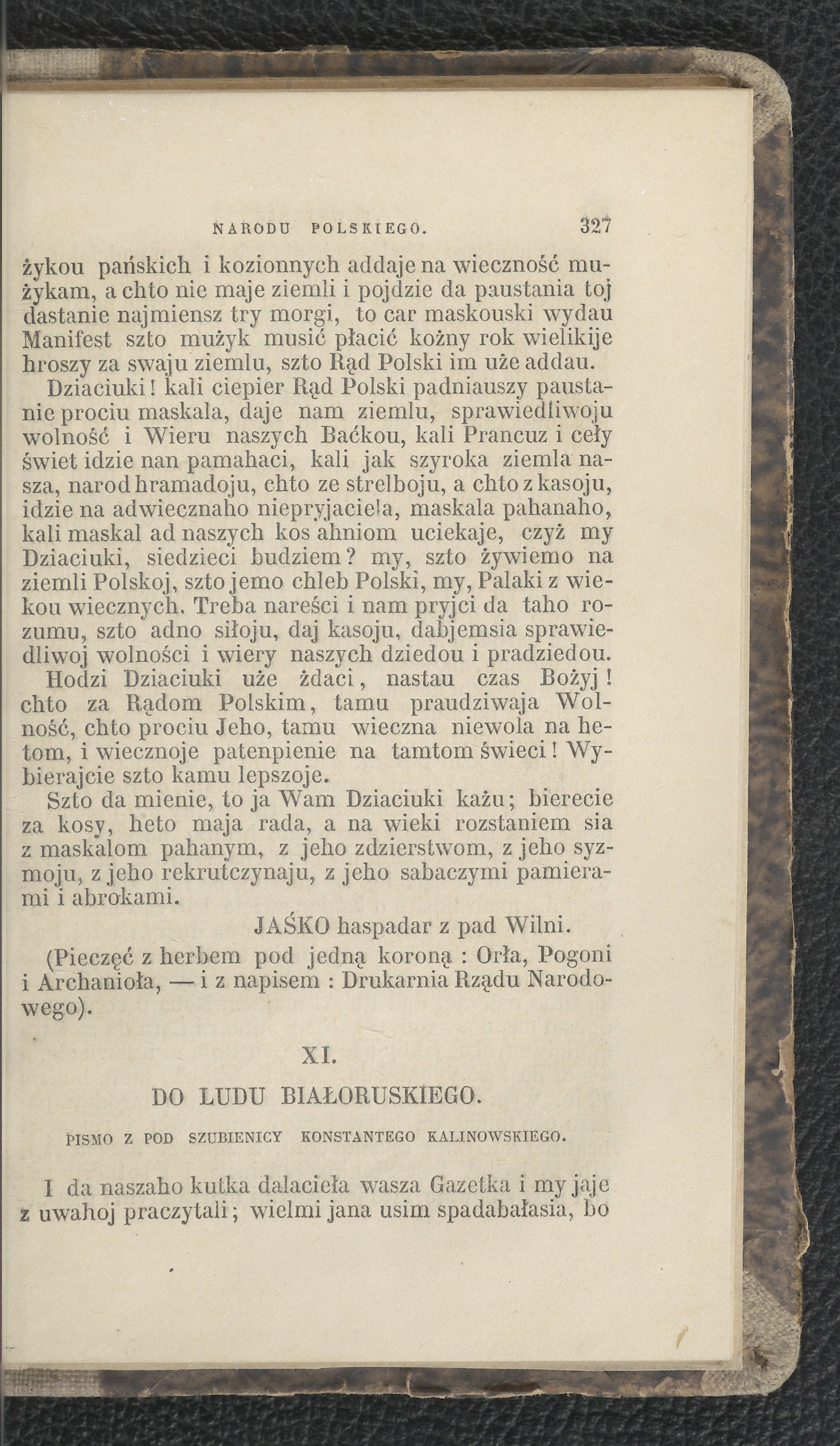
Pismo from Agaton Giller's book

== Listy s pad szubienicy ==
Listy s pad szubienicy (Letters from beneath the Gallows) were written by Kalinowski after he was arrested and waited for trial. There are three unnumbered and signed by "Jasko haspadar s pad Wilni"; the document got the name after a publication by Agaton Giller in 1867 in a book Historja powstania narodu polskiego w 1861—1864 as A letter to Belarusian people. Letters from beneath the Gallows, by Konstanty Kalinowski (Do Ludu Bialoruskiego. Pismo z pod szubienicy Konstantego Kalinowskiego). Because of this letter, Kalinowski is often seen as a hero and martyr of the Belarusian land. In the letter Kalinowski urges people to continue the fight against "Moscow yoke".

The second letter from Letters from beneath the Gallows

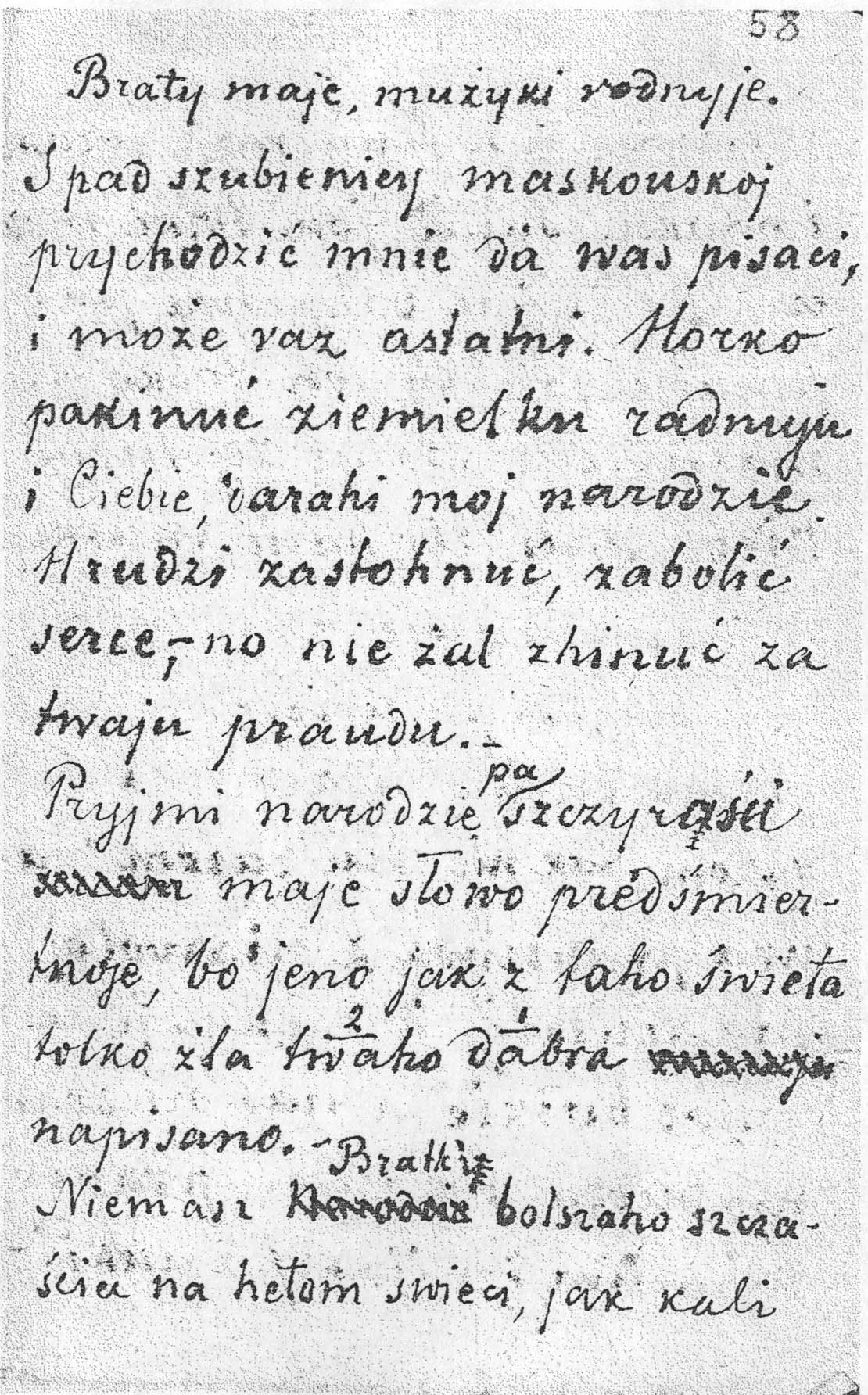
Page 1

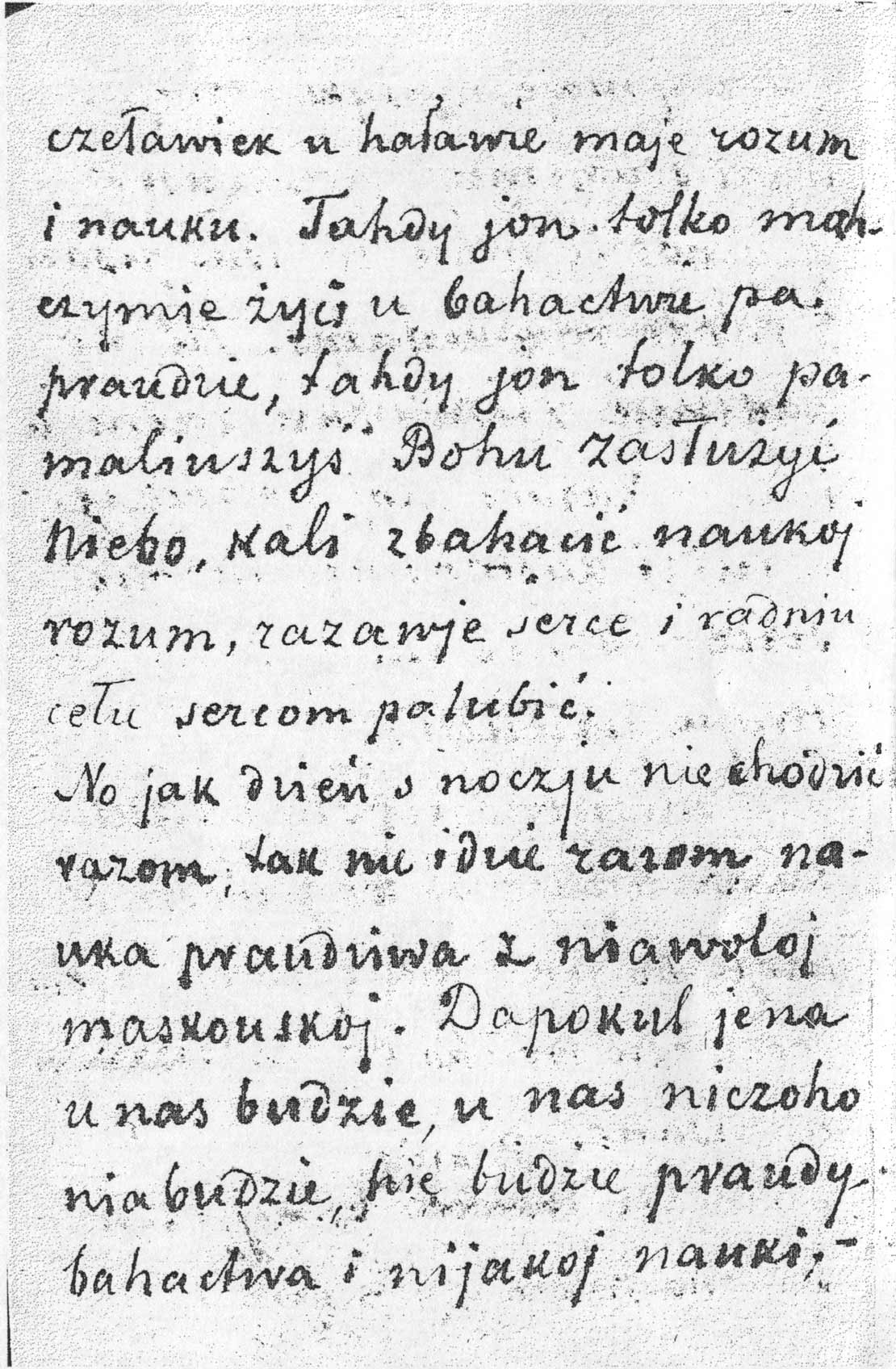
Page 2

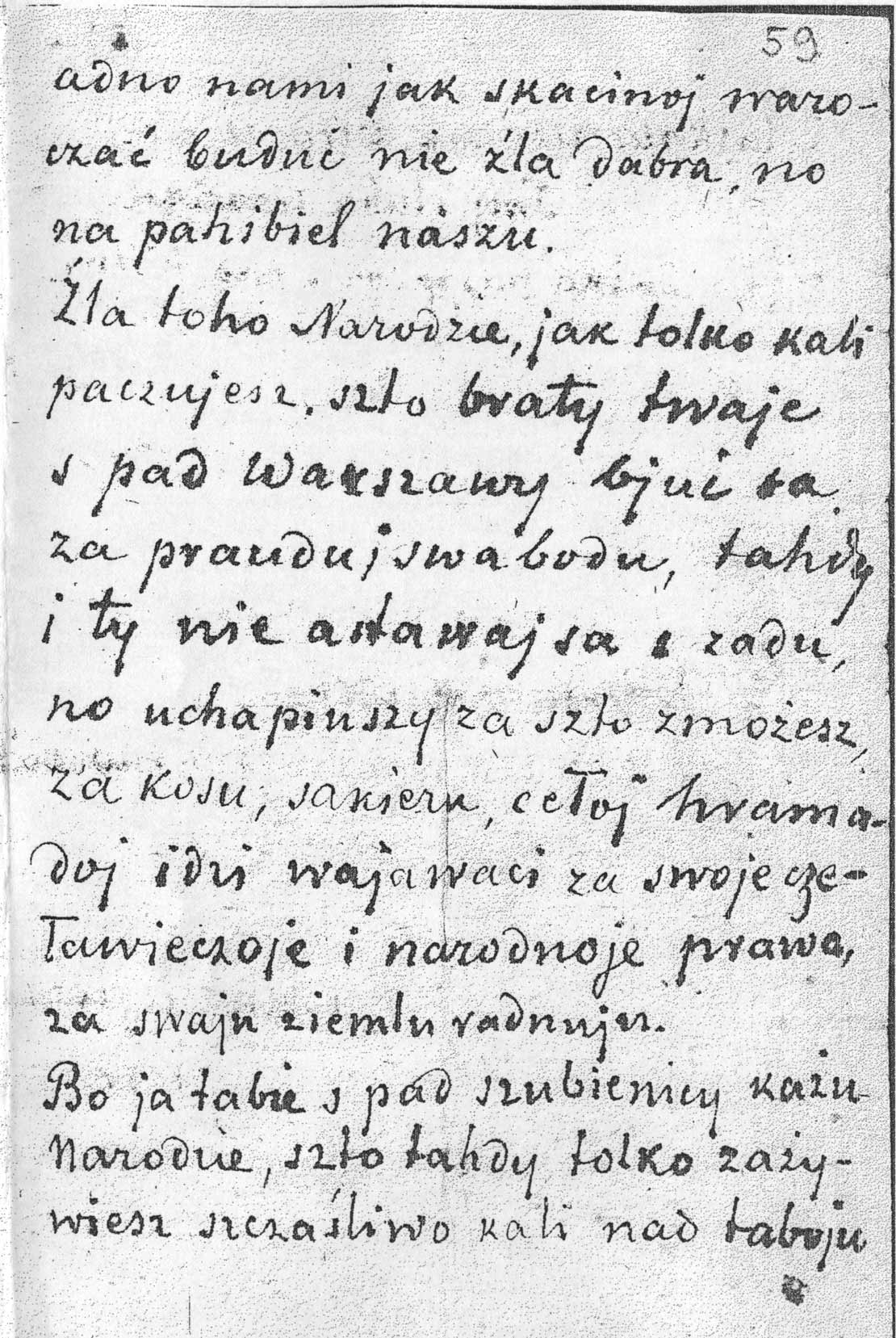
Page 3

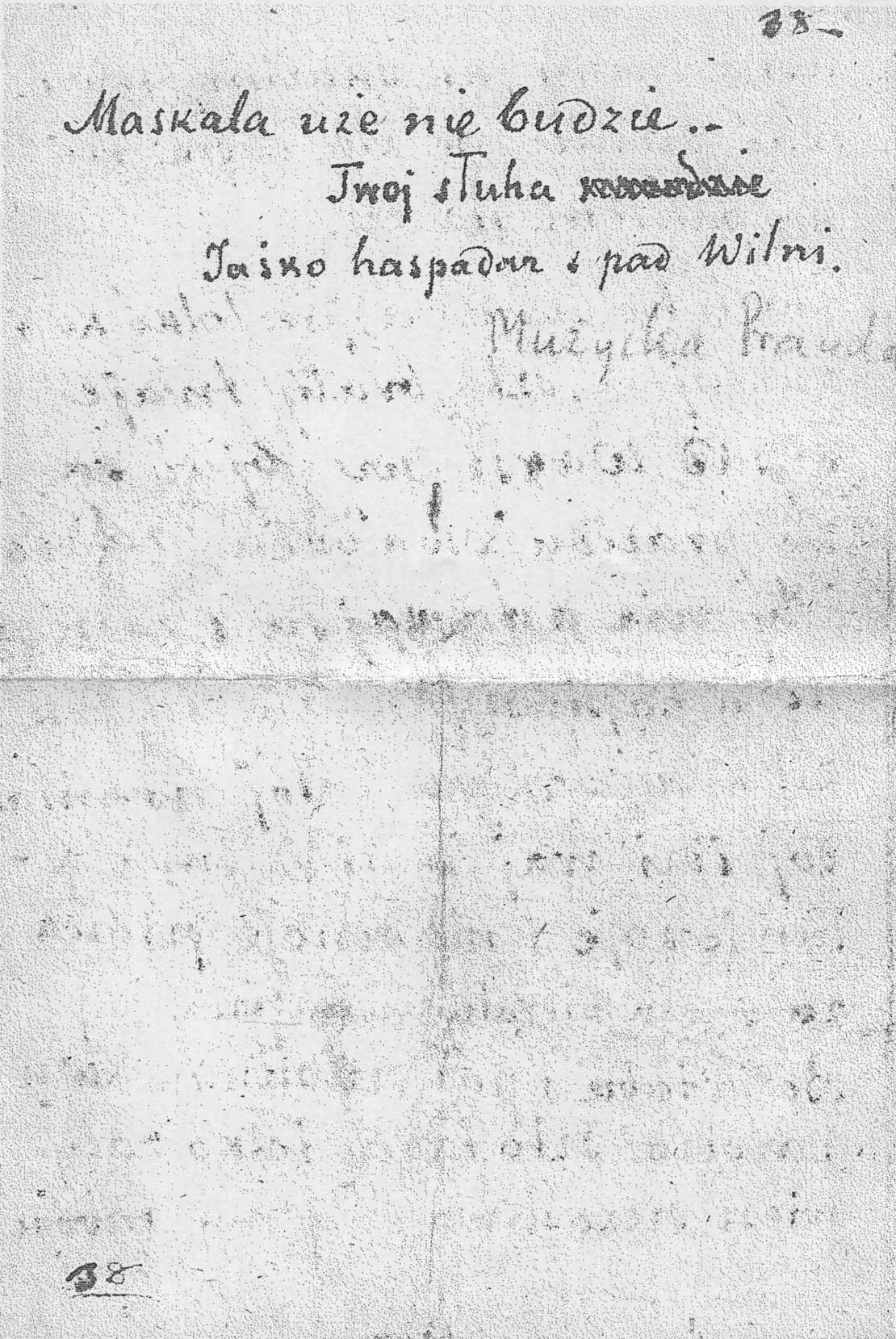
Page 4
Do Ludu Bialoruskiego from Agaton Giller's book (1867)

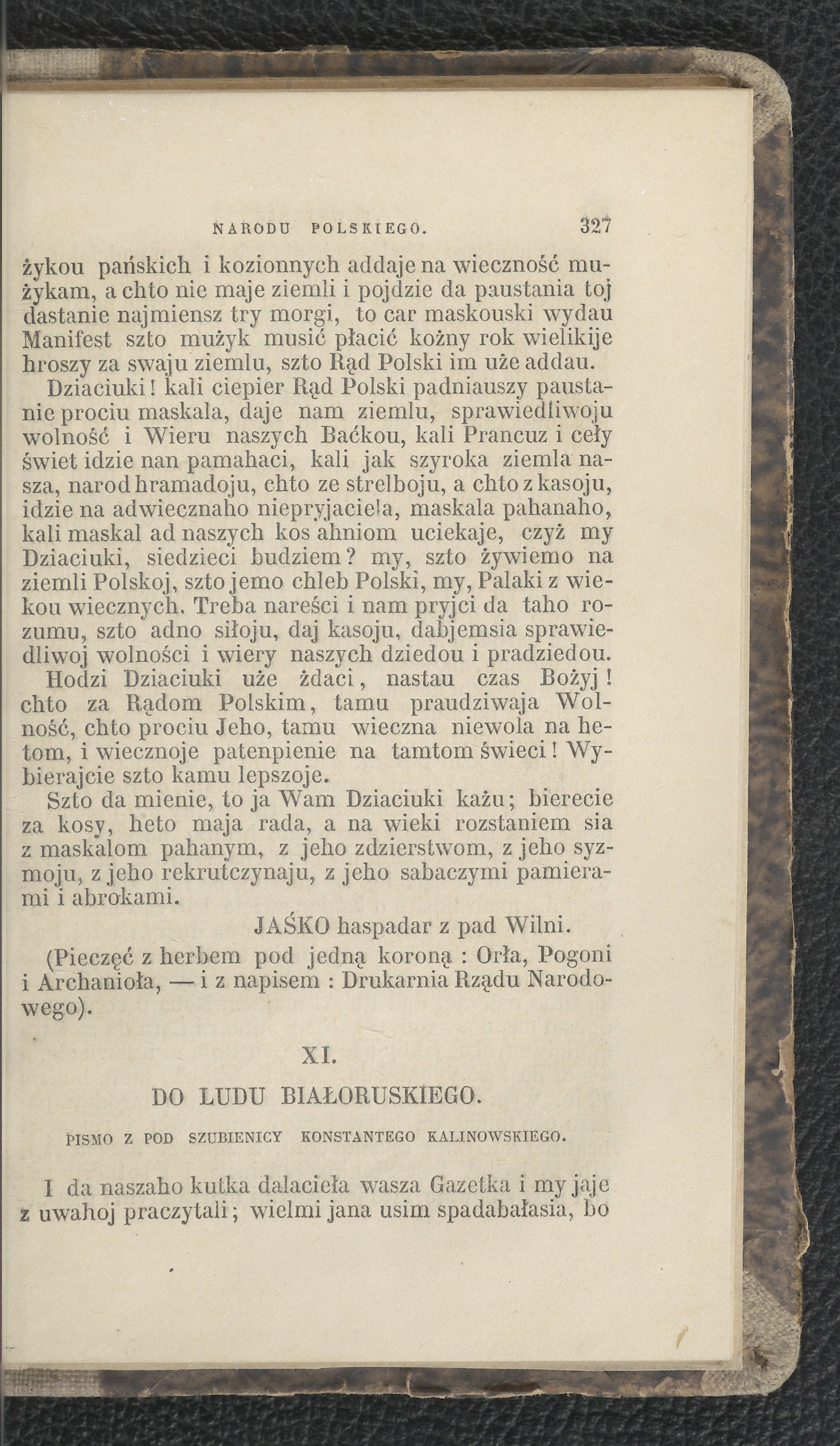

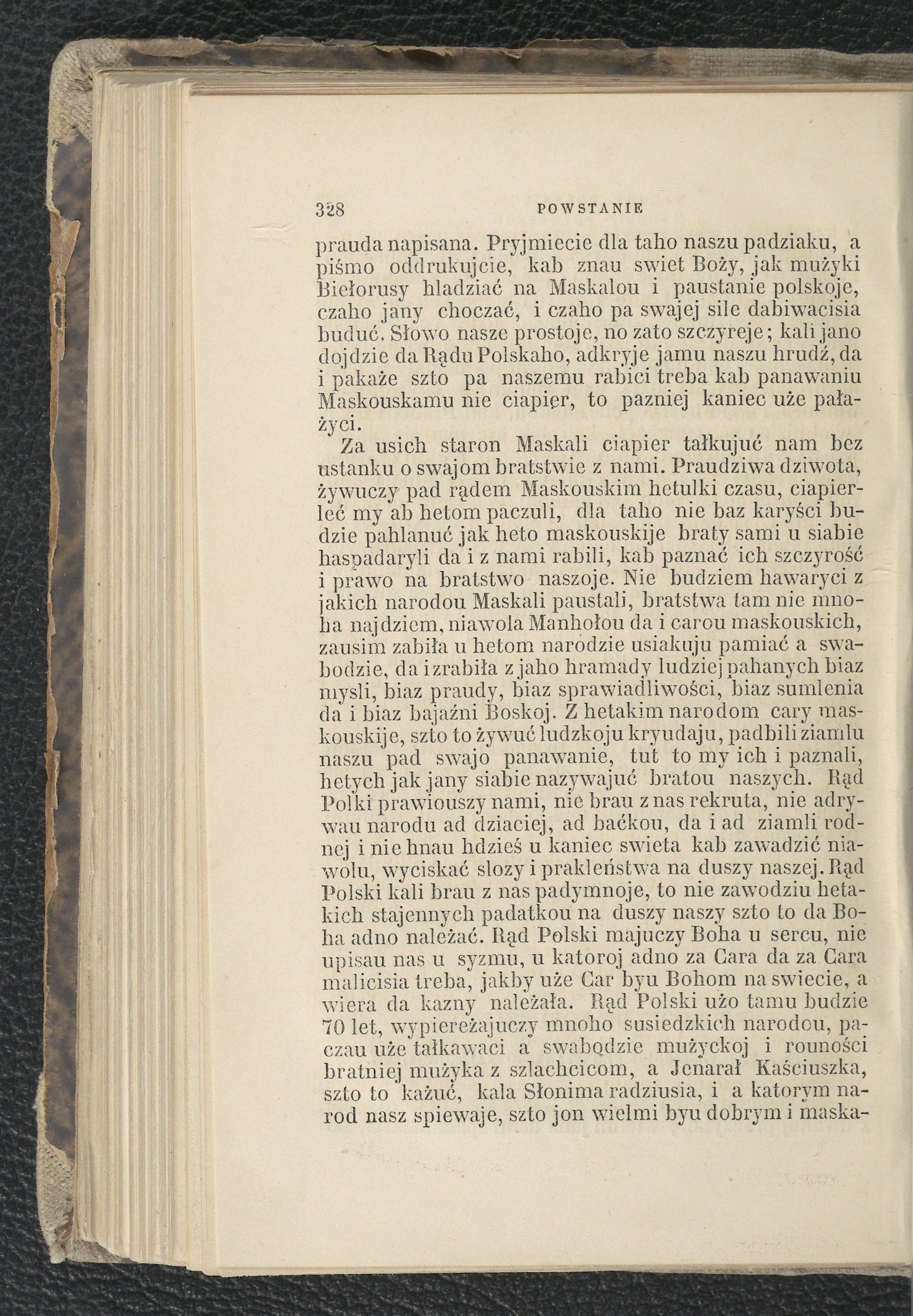

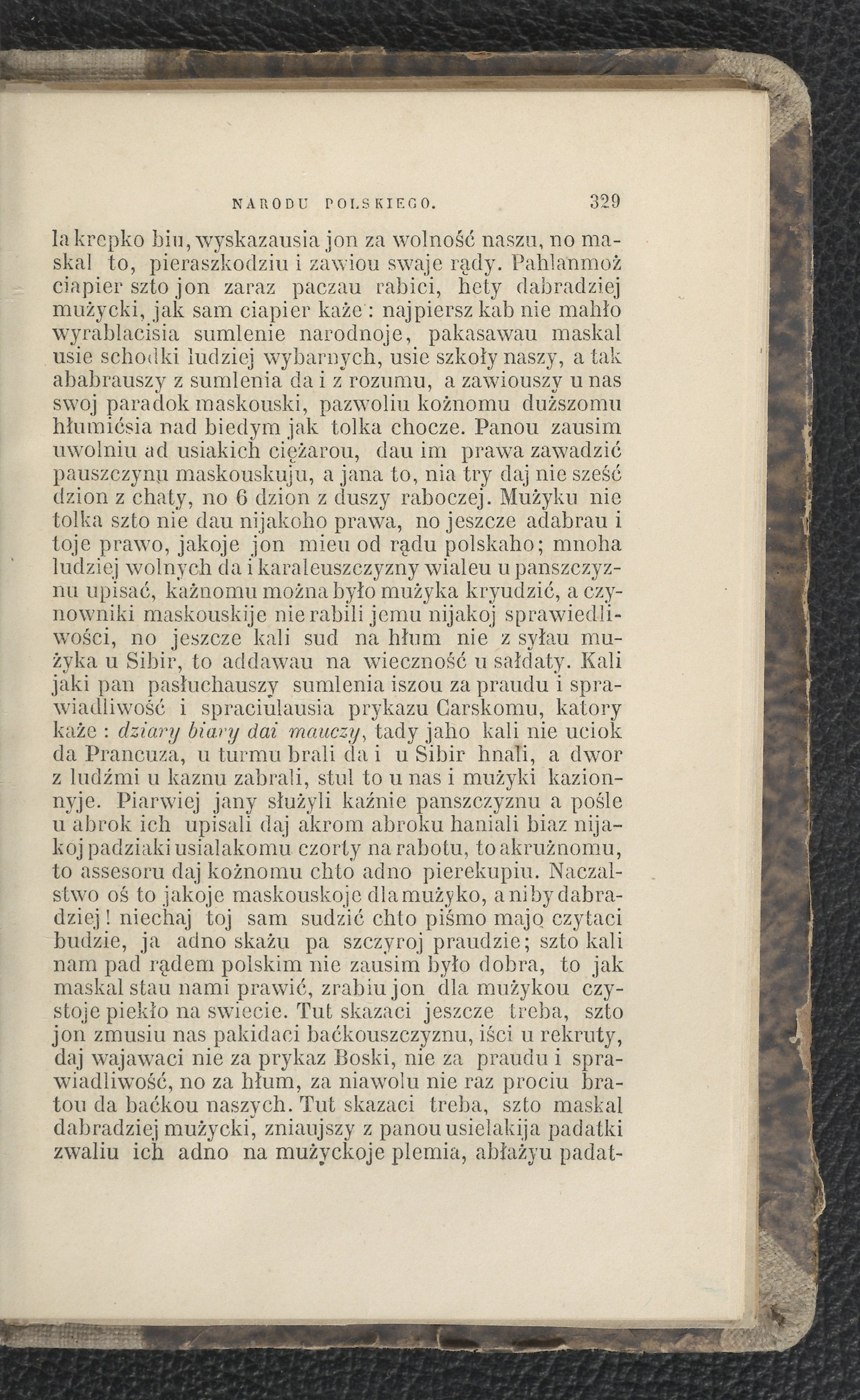

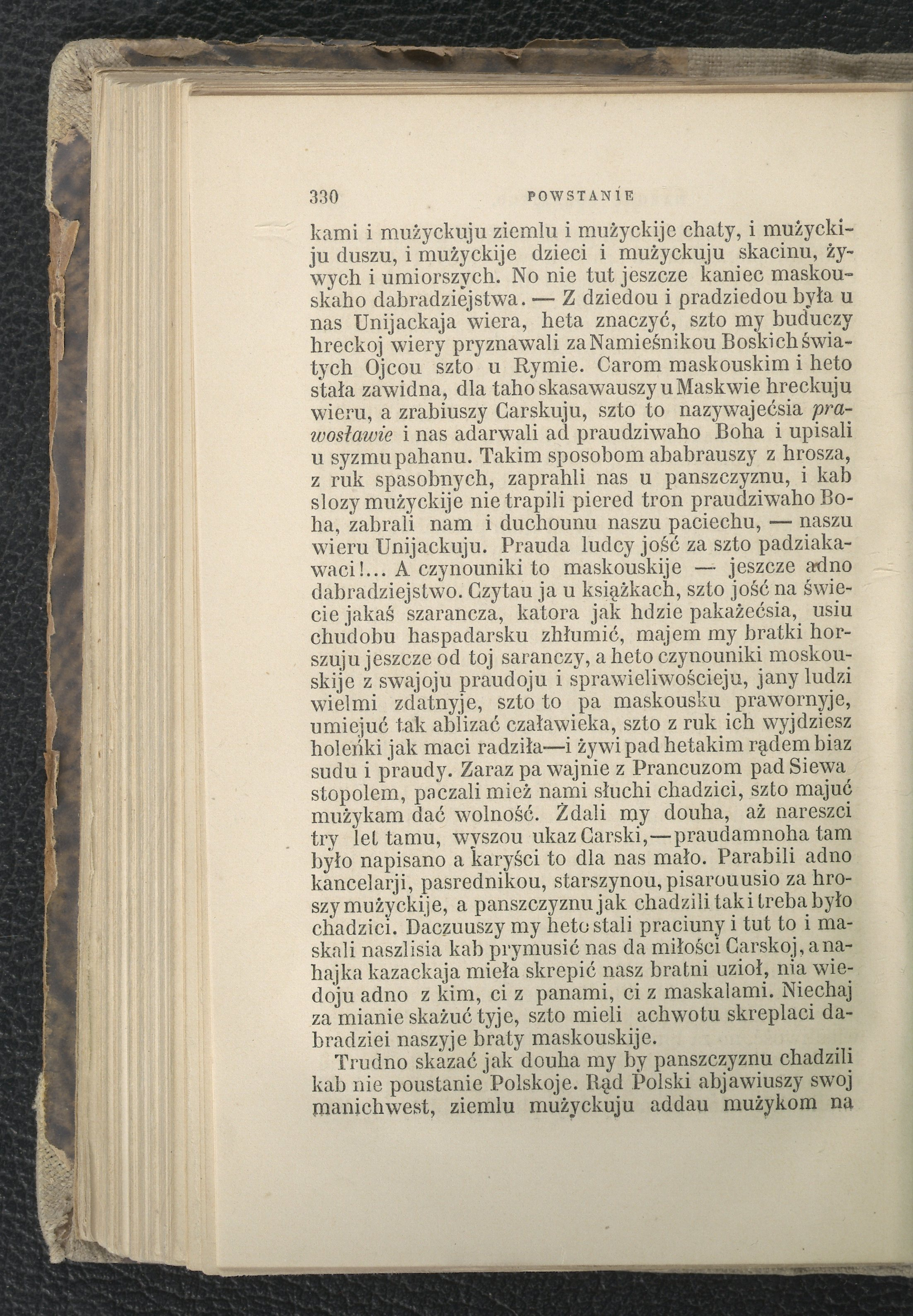

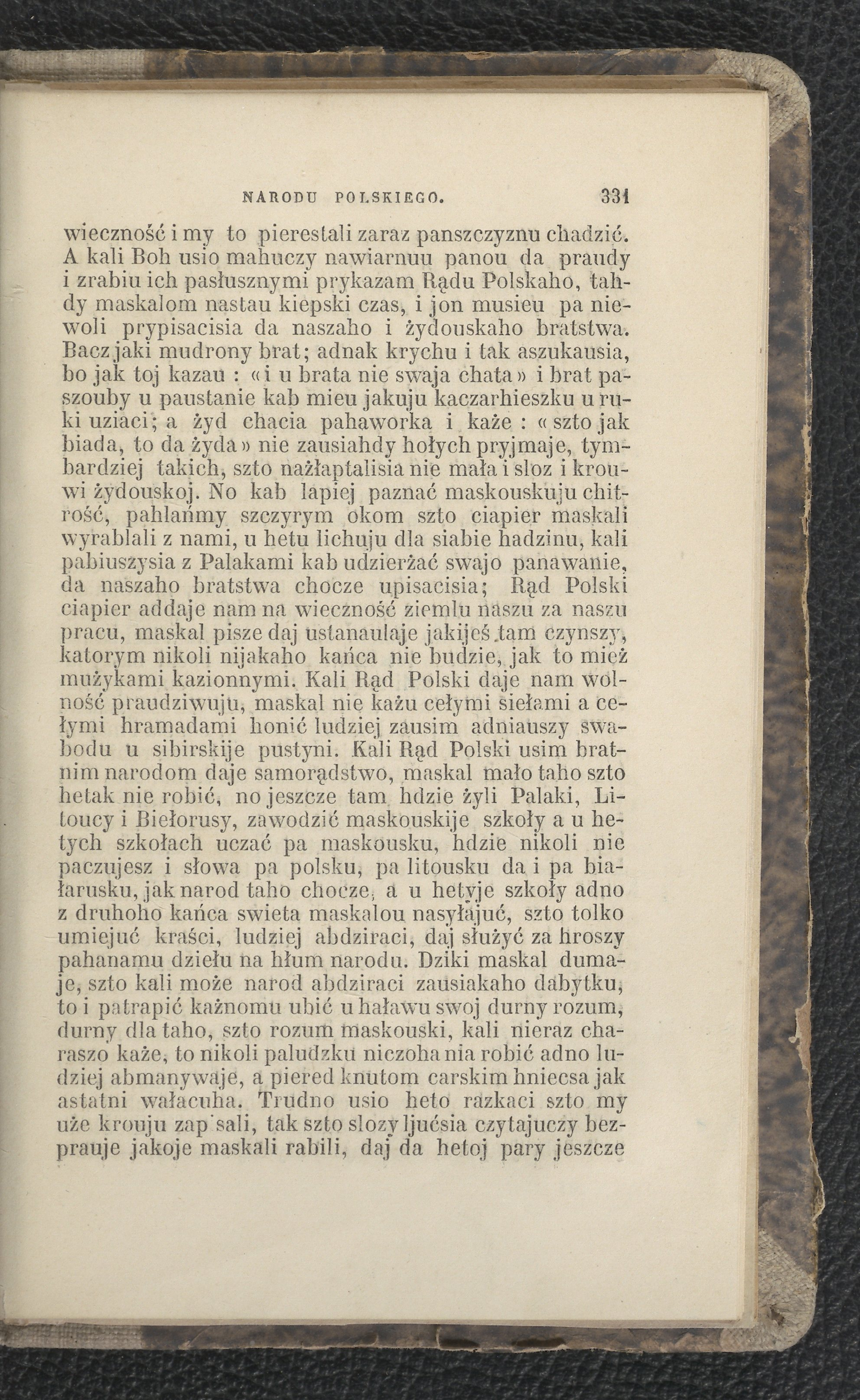

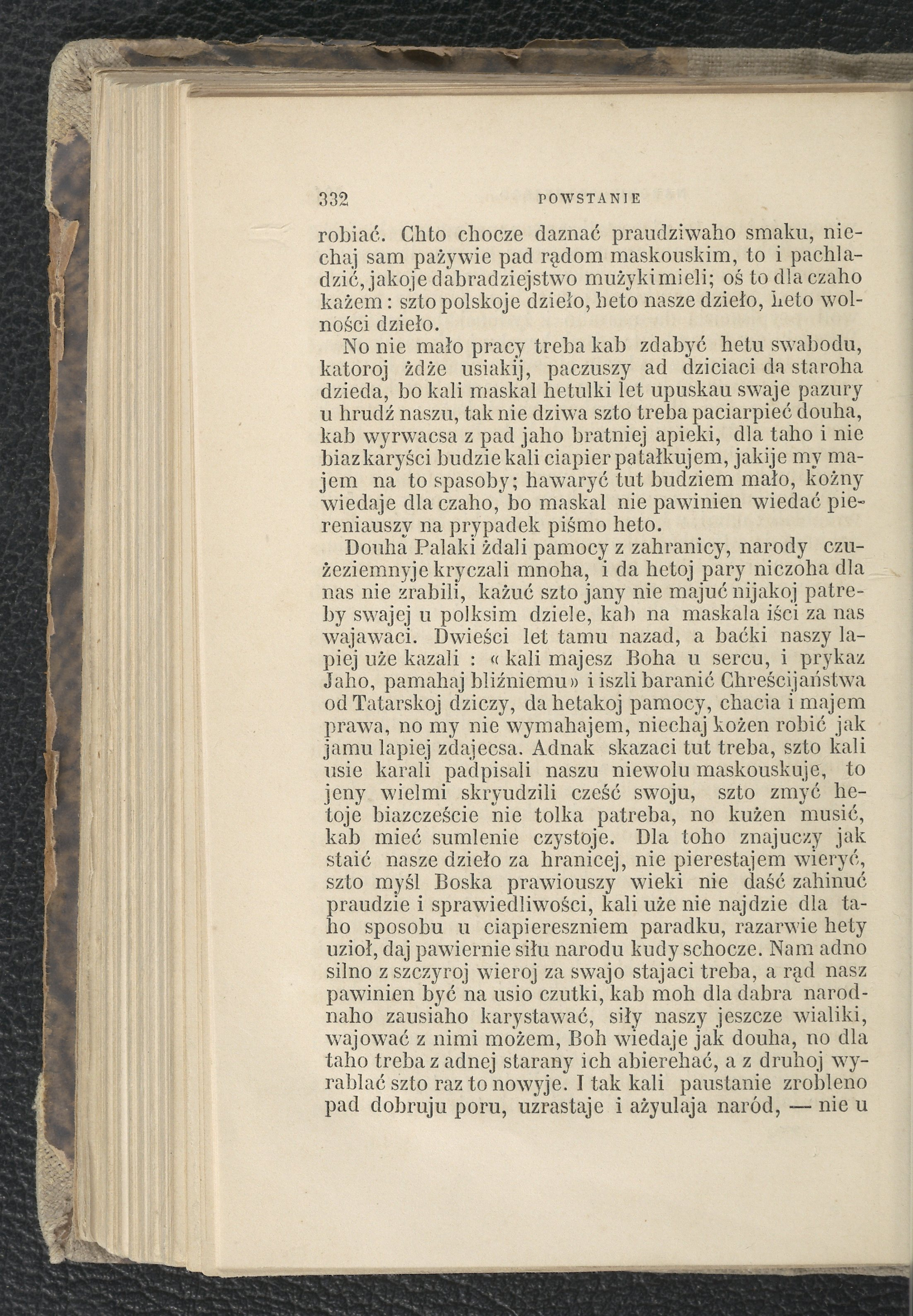

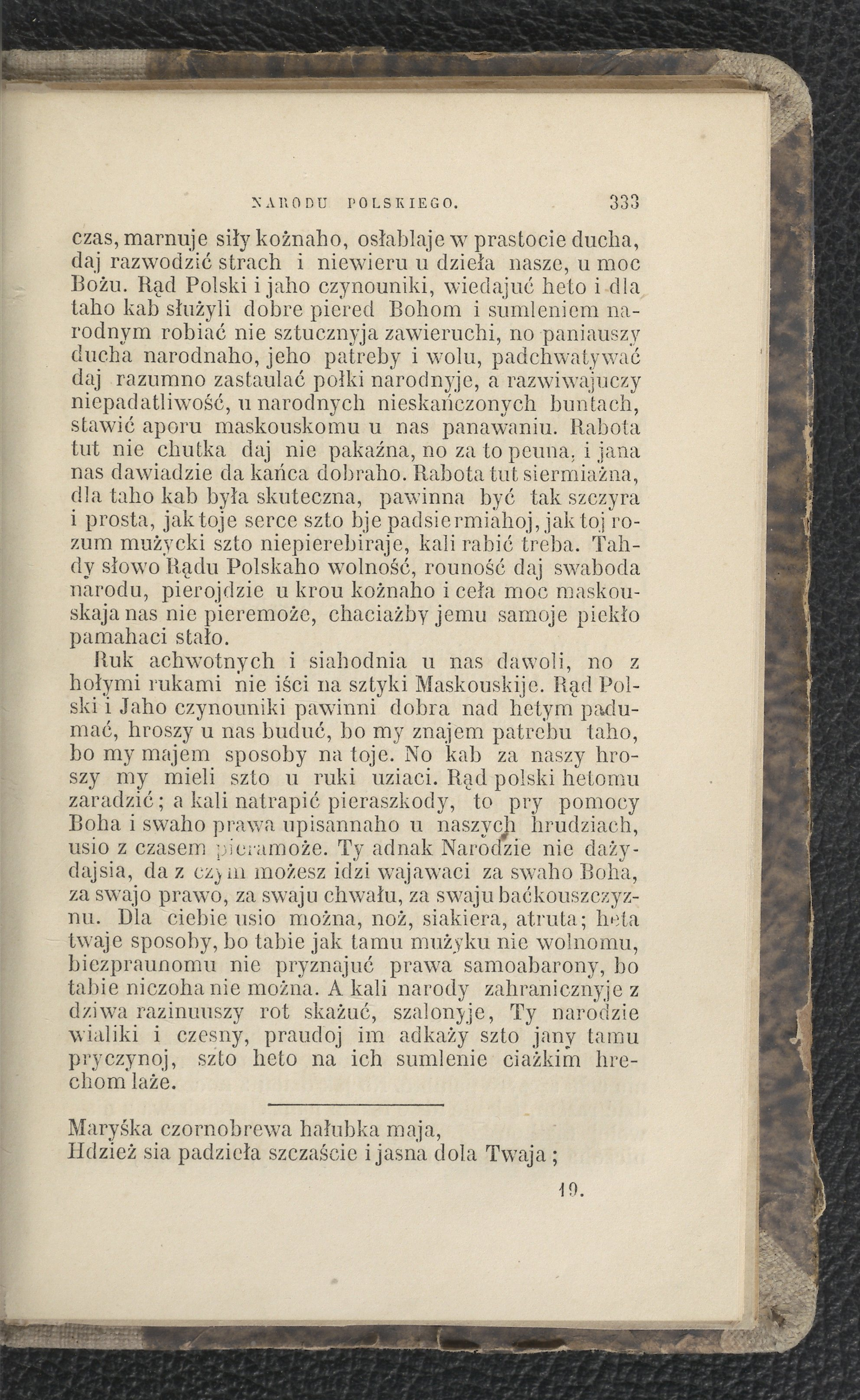

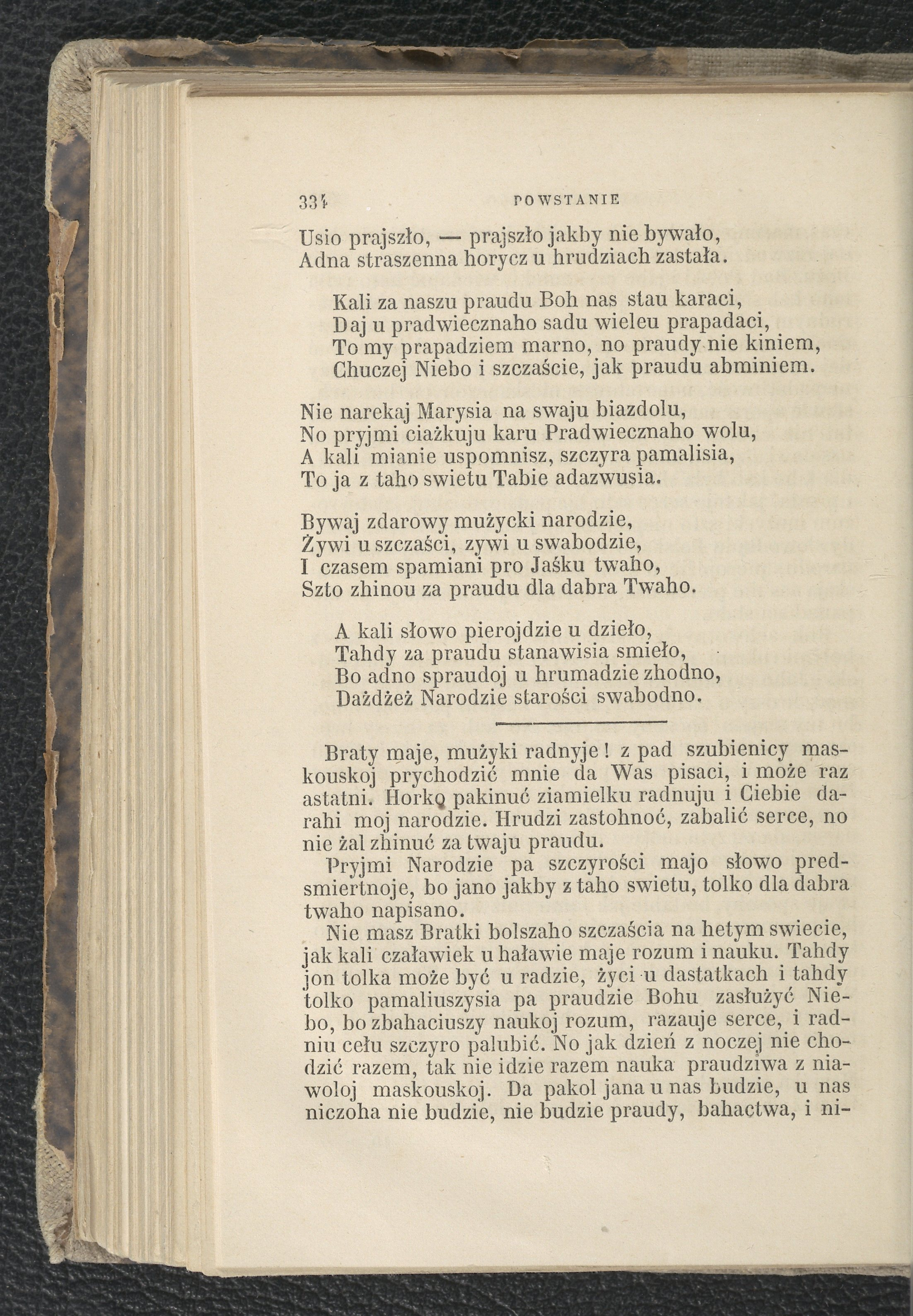

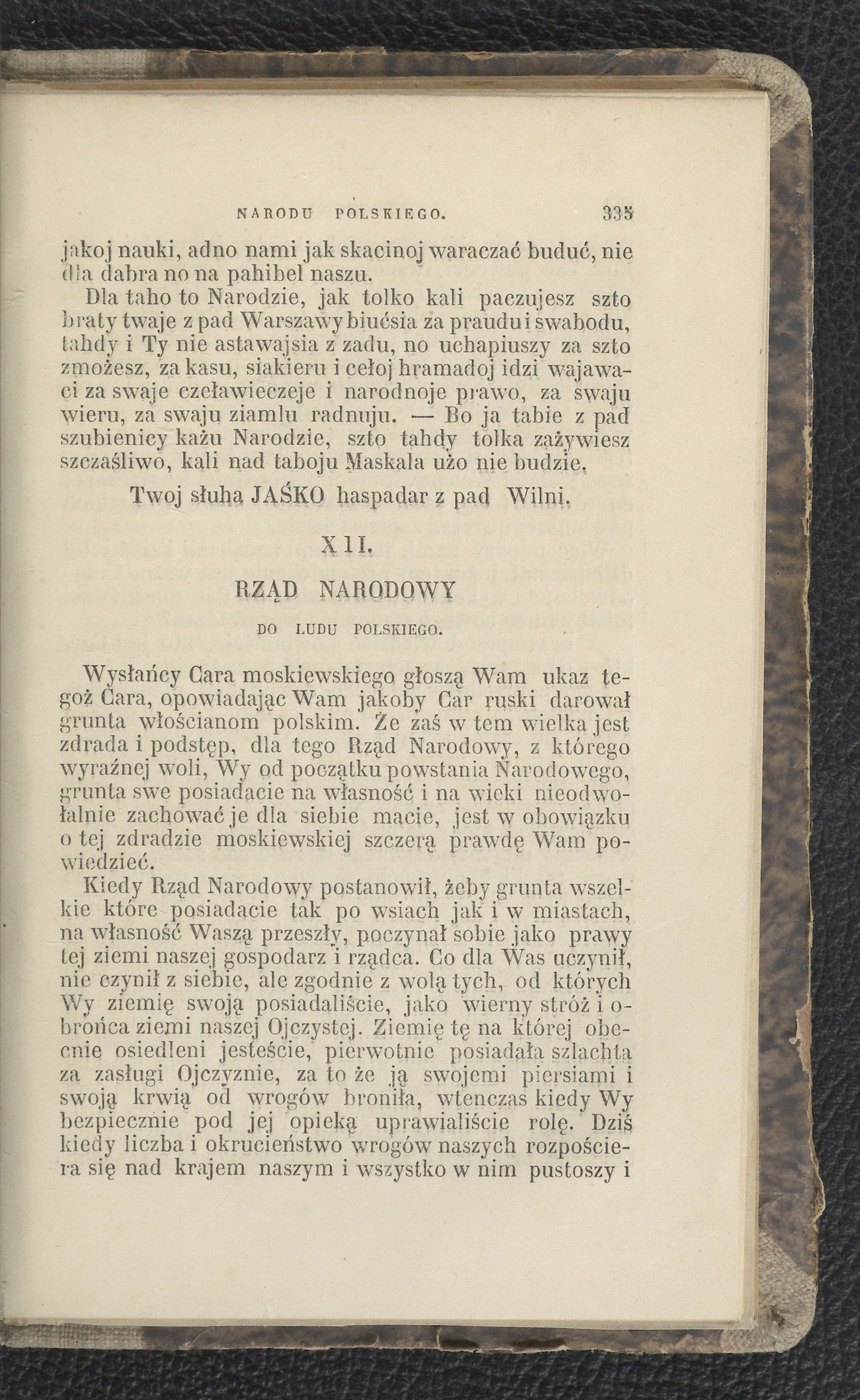

== Unpublished draft of the sixth issue ==
Draft of the sixth issue of Muzyckaja prauda was found in Vilnius, in the Church of St. Francis and St. Bernard, in 1989. As noted by Smalianchuk, the draft "invoked an uprising against the "Moscow Tsar". It considered peasants and petty bourgeoisie to be the main force and urged not to trust landlords". This text was not published during the uprising.

Draft of the sixth issue

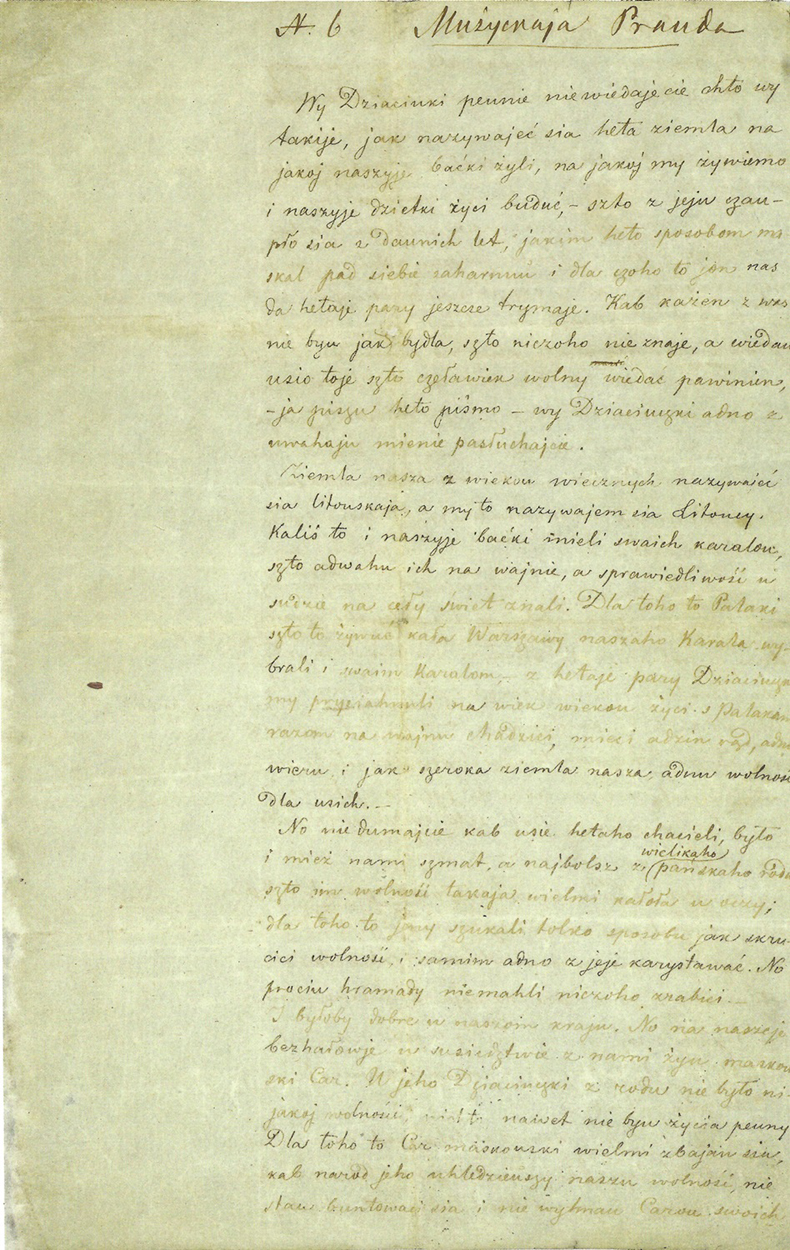
Page 1

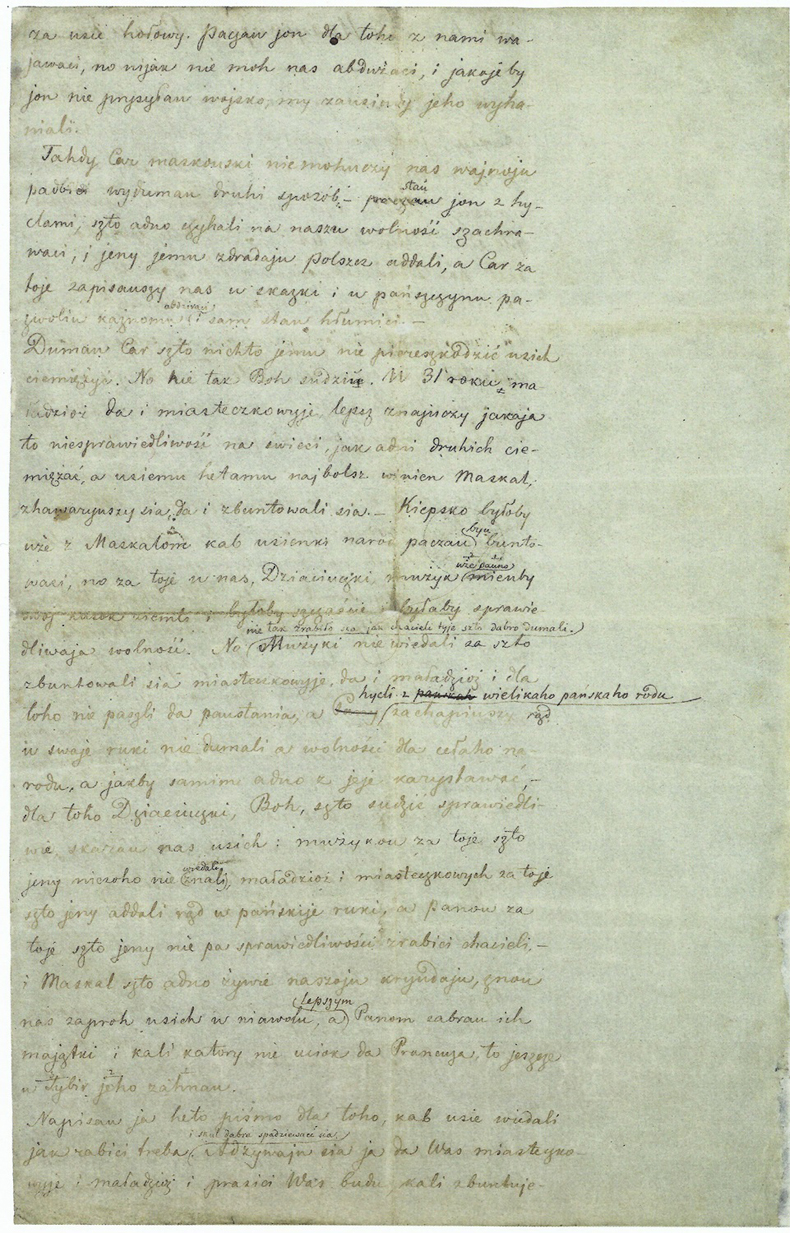
Page 2

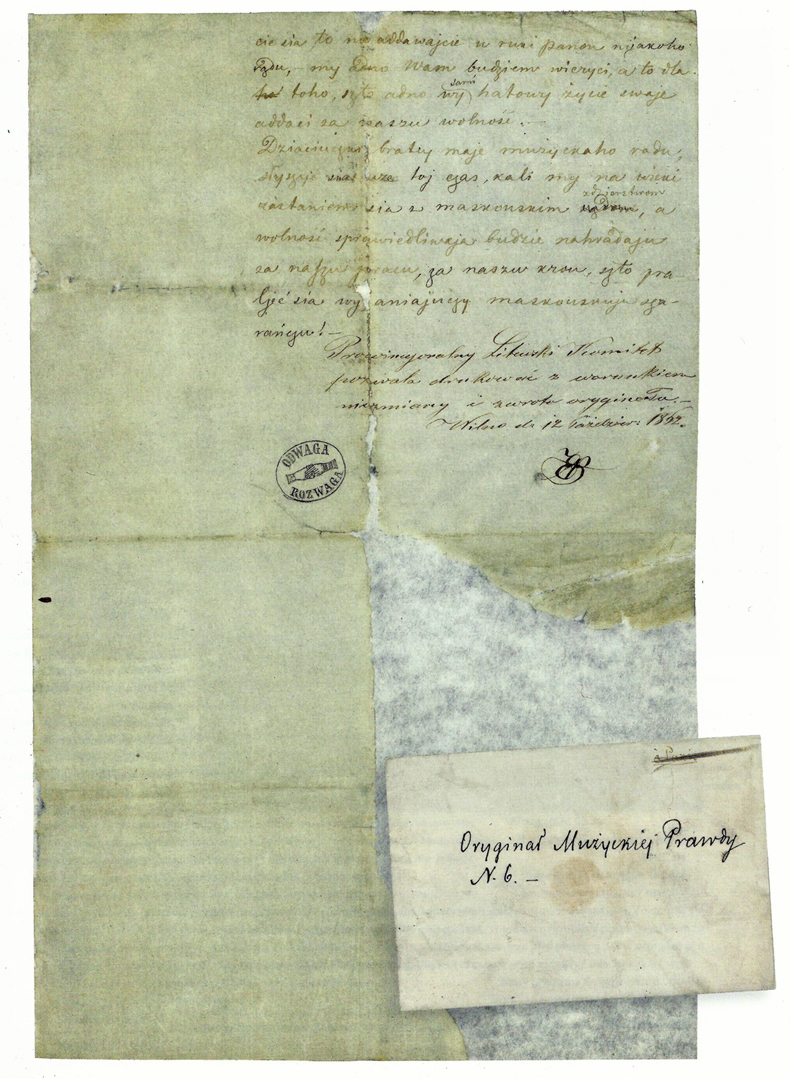
Page 3

== Legacy ==
Along with the January Uprising, the newspaper was a major catalyst in initiating the national awakening of the Belarusian people, reinforcing their uniqueness from both Polish and Russian ethnicities.

== Sources ==
- Fajnhauz, Dawid (1963). "Prasa konspiracyjna powstania styczniowego na Litwie i Białorusi (1861-1864)" (PDF). Rocznik Białostocki (4): [43]–102.
- Kalinoŭski, Kastusʹ (1980). Zaprudnik, Jan; Bird, Thomas E. (eds.). The 1863 Uprising in Byelorussia: 'Peasants' Truth' and 'Letters from beneath the Gallows.' Texts and Commentaries. New York: The Kreceuski Foundation, Inc.
