= Konstanty Kalinowski =

Polish writer and journalist (1838–1864)

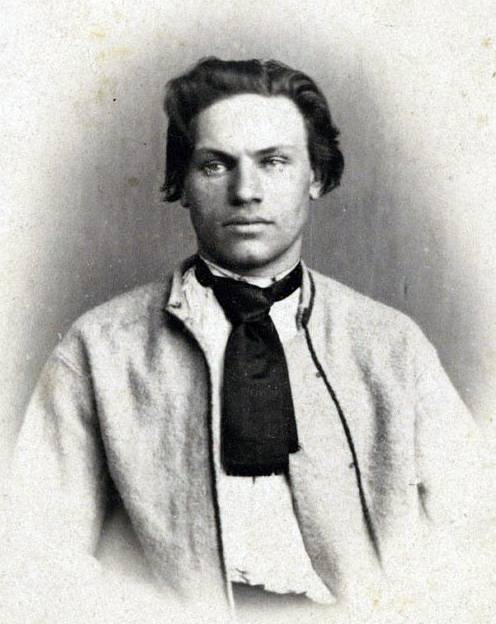
- Born: 2 February 1838; Mostowlany, Russian Empire
- Died: 22 March 1864 (aged 26); Vilnius, Russian Empire
- Education: Saint Petersburg State University
- Family: Kalinowski family

Konstanty Kalinowski, (Note: Belarusian: Касту́сь Каліно́ўскі, romanized: Kastuś Kalinoŭski also Вінцэ́нт Канстанці́н Каліно́ўскі, Vincent Kanstancin Kalinoŭski, Lithuanian: Konstantinas Kalinauskas.) or Wincenty Konstanty Kalinowski (2 February [O.S. 21 January] 1838 – 22 March [O.S. 10 March] 1864), was a Polish–Lithuanian noble and one of the leaders of the 1863 January Uprising within the former Polish–Lithuanian Commonwealth. He is a national hero for Poles, Lithuanians, and Belarusians. Particularly in Belarus, Kalinowski is revered as Father of the Nation and icon of Belarusian nationalism.

Kalinowski conducted his activities in the spirit of resurrecting the common state of Lithuania and Ruthenia, and Poland in the traditions of the Polish–Lithuanian Commonwealth.

== Early life and education ==
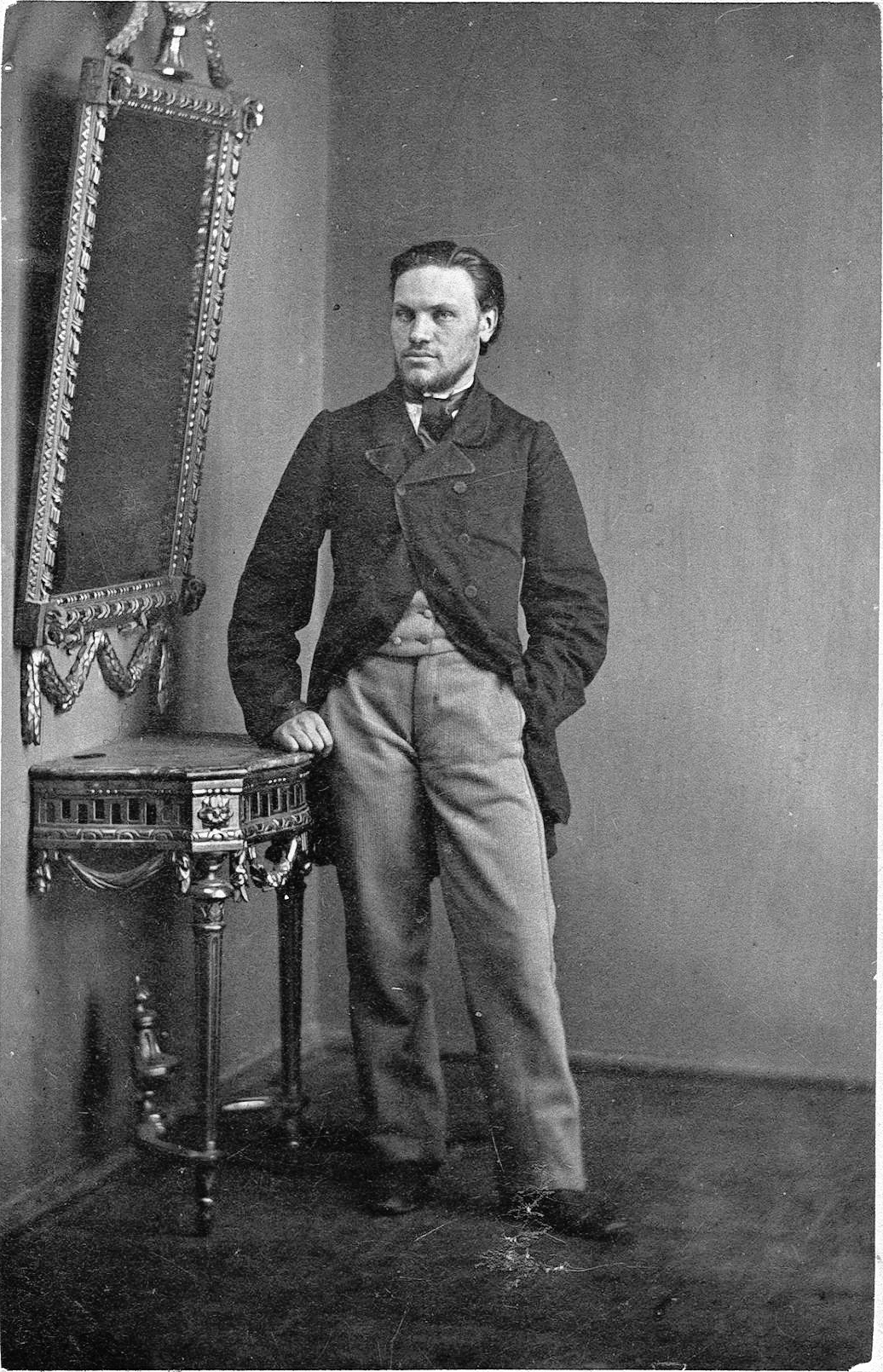
Konstanty Kalinowski, 1863

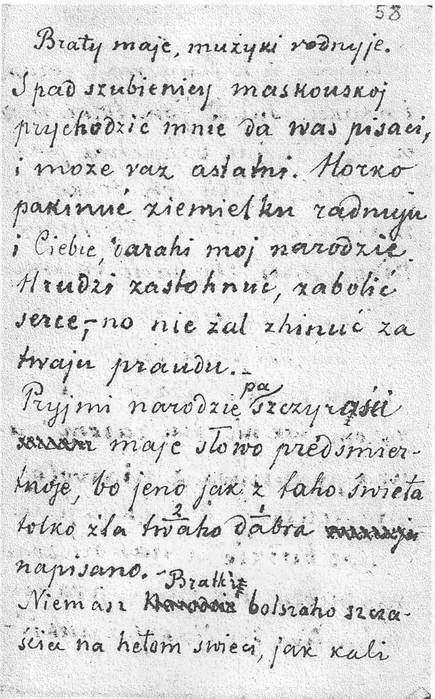
A sheet with a fragment of Kalinowski's "Letters from under the gallows" in Belarusian Łacinka

Kalinowski was born in Mostovlyany, in Grodnensky Uyezd of the Russian Empire (now Mostowlany, Podlaskie Voivodeship, Poland) to a szlachta family. The Kalinowskis hailed from the Polish region of Mazovia and bore the Kalinowa coat of arms. His father, Szymon, was a manager of the Mostowlany farm and manor. His older brother, Wiktor Kalinowski would become a historian. In 1849 his father, Szymon bought a folwark near Svislach (now Belarus) where Konstanty grew up.

After graduating from a local school in Svislach in 1855, Kalinowski entered the faculty of Medicine of the University of Moscow as an external student. After one semester he moved to St. Petersburg, where his brother was, and joined the faculty of Law at the University of St. Petersburg. Along with his brother Wiktor, he got himself involved in Polish students' conspiracies and secret cultural societies, headed by Zygmunt Sierakowski and Jarosław Dąbrowski. After graduating in 1860, Konstanty traveled to Vilnius where he unsuccessfully applied to join the civil service under Vladimir Ivanovich Nazimov.

== Career ==
=== Literary work ===
Konstanty then returned to the Grodno area in 1861. Konstanty started publishing Mužyckaja prauda (Peasants' Truth), the first newspaper in Belarusian, written in Łacinka, first published in June 1862. The Peasants' Truth was issued seven times until 1863. Konstanty also published two other Polish language newspapers. Konstanty was more aligned with the Reds which represented a democratic movement uniting peasants, workers, and some clergy rather than the more moderate Whites.

In his literary work, Kalinowski underlined the need to liberate all people of the former Polish–Lithuanian Commonwealth from Russia's occupation and to conserve and promote the Greek Catholic faith and Belarusian language. He also promoted the idea of activisation of peasants for the cause of national liberation, the idea that was until then dominated by the gentry. He favored the Polish–Lithuanian Commonwealth's traditions of democracy, tolerance and freedom, as opposed to national oppression of cultures dominated by Imperial Russia:

While the Polish Council gives all fraternal peoples self-help, the Muscovite not only does not do so, but even where Poles, Lithuanians and Belarusians lived, he opens Muscovite schools, and in these schools they teach in Muscovite language, where you will never hear a word in Polish, in Lithuanian or in Belarusian, as the people want [...]

There is some academic debate about which texts to attribute to Konstanty. Konstanty was unhappy with the timing and objectives of the January Uprising, which broke out on 23 January 1863. There had been a growing rift between him and other leaders of the uprising in Warsaw.

After the outbreak of the January Uprising, he was involved in the secret Provincial Lithuanian Committee in Vilnius. Soon he was promoted to the commissar of the Polish National Government for the Grodno Governorate. His writings made him popular both among the peasants and the gentry, which enabled the partisan units under his command to grow rapidly. Because of his successes he was promoted to the rank of Plenipotentiary Commissar of the Government for Lithuania (Polish: Komisarz Pełnomocny Rządu na Litwę), which made him the commander-in-chief of all partisan units fighting in the areas of the former Grand Duchy of Lithuania, which are in modern Lithuania, Belarus, eastern Poland and Ukraine.

== Last months, capture, imprisonment, execution and burial ==
However, after initial successes against the Russian armies, the Russians moved a 120,000 man army to the area and the revolutionaries started to lose most of the skirmishes. Finally, Kalinowski was betrayed by one of his soldiers and handed over to the Russians.

He was imprisoned in Vilnius, where he wrote one of his most notable works – Letters from Beneath the Gallows (Pismo z-pad szybienicy), a passionate credo for his compatriots. He was tried by a court-martial for leading the revolt against Russia and sentenced to death. On 22 March 1864, at the age 26, he was publicly executed on Lukiškės Square in Vilnius.

Kalinowski's remains, along with those of others, were clandestinely buried by the Tsarist authorities on the site of a military fortress on top of the Gediminas Hill in Vilnius. In 2017, Kalinowski's remains were excavated and identified, and solemnly reinterred in the Rasos Cemetery on 22 November 2019.

== Legacy ==
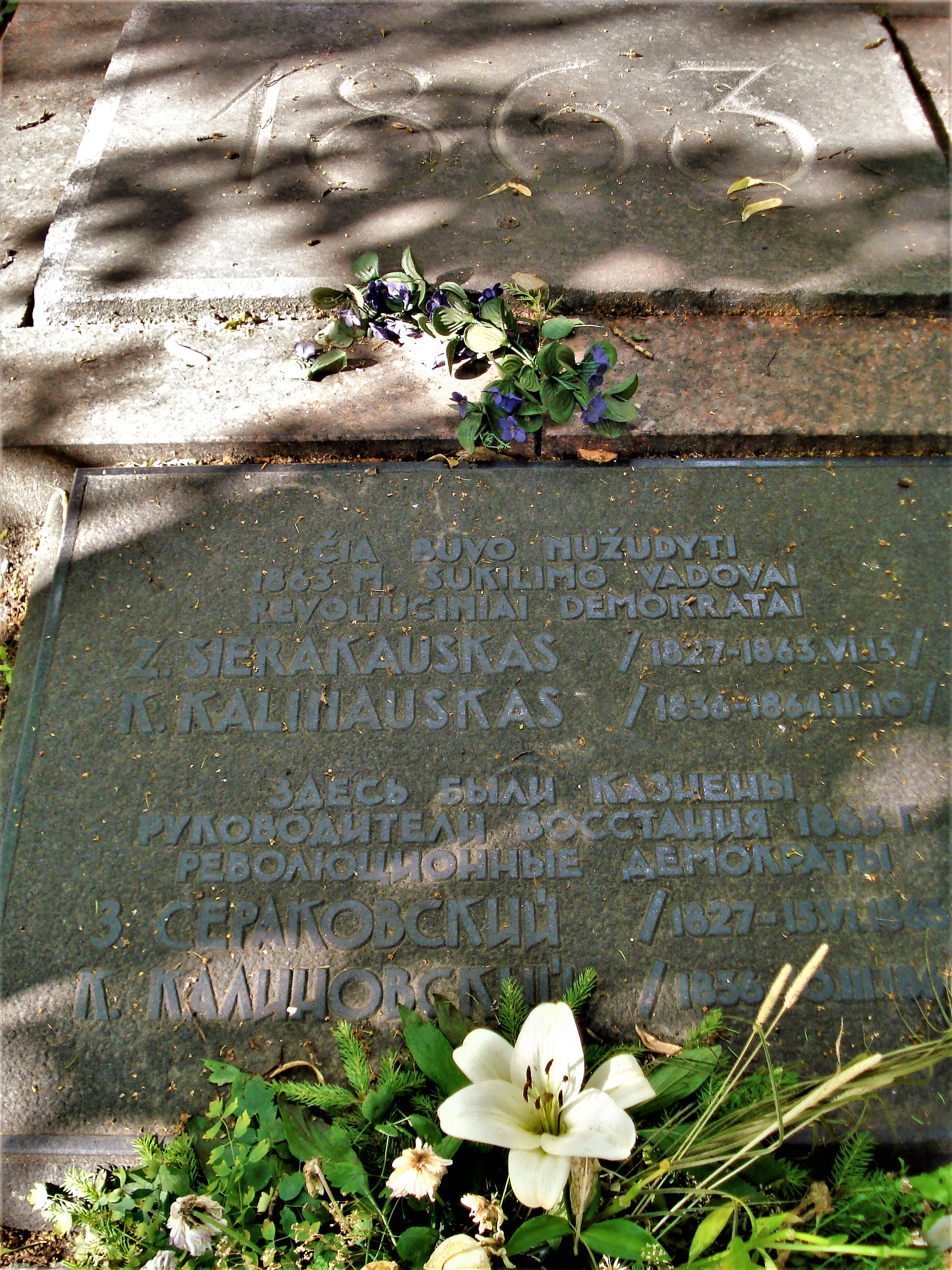
A tablet marking Kalinowski's execution site, Lukiškės Square, Vilnius

Kalinowski is one of the main characters of Uladzimir Karatkievich's 1965 novel Ears of Rye Under Thy Sickle, set on the eve of the Uprising.

During the so-called Jeans Revolution, protesters who disputed the 2006 Belarusian presidential election symbolically renamed October Square, after the Bolshevik revolution, Kalinovski Square. Kalinovski Square was also the title of a documentary film about these events.

During the 2022 Russian invasion of Ukraine, Belarusian volunteers fighting on the side of Ukraine formed a battalion named Kastuś Kalinoŭski, which later transformed into a regiment.

In Ukrainian Rivne, a street was named after Kalinowski. In June 2024, a memorial plaque in honor of Kalinowski was unveiled in a street named after him in Chernihiv.

The Polish Government's scholarship program for Belarusian students expelled from their studies after the Jeans Revolution has been named after Konstanty Kalinowski since 2006.

== Gallery ==
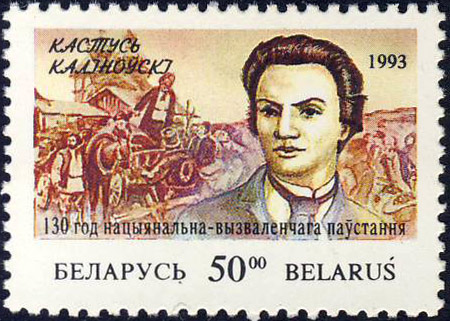
Belarusian commemorative stamp in honor of Kalinowski (1993)

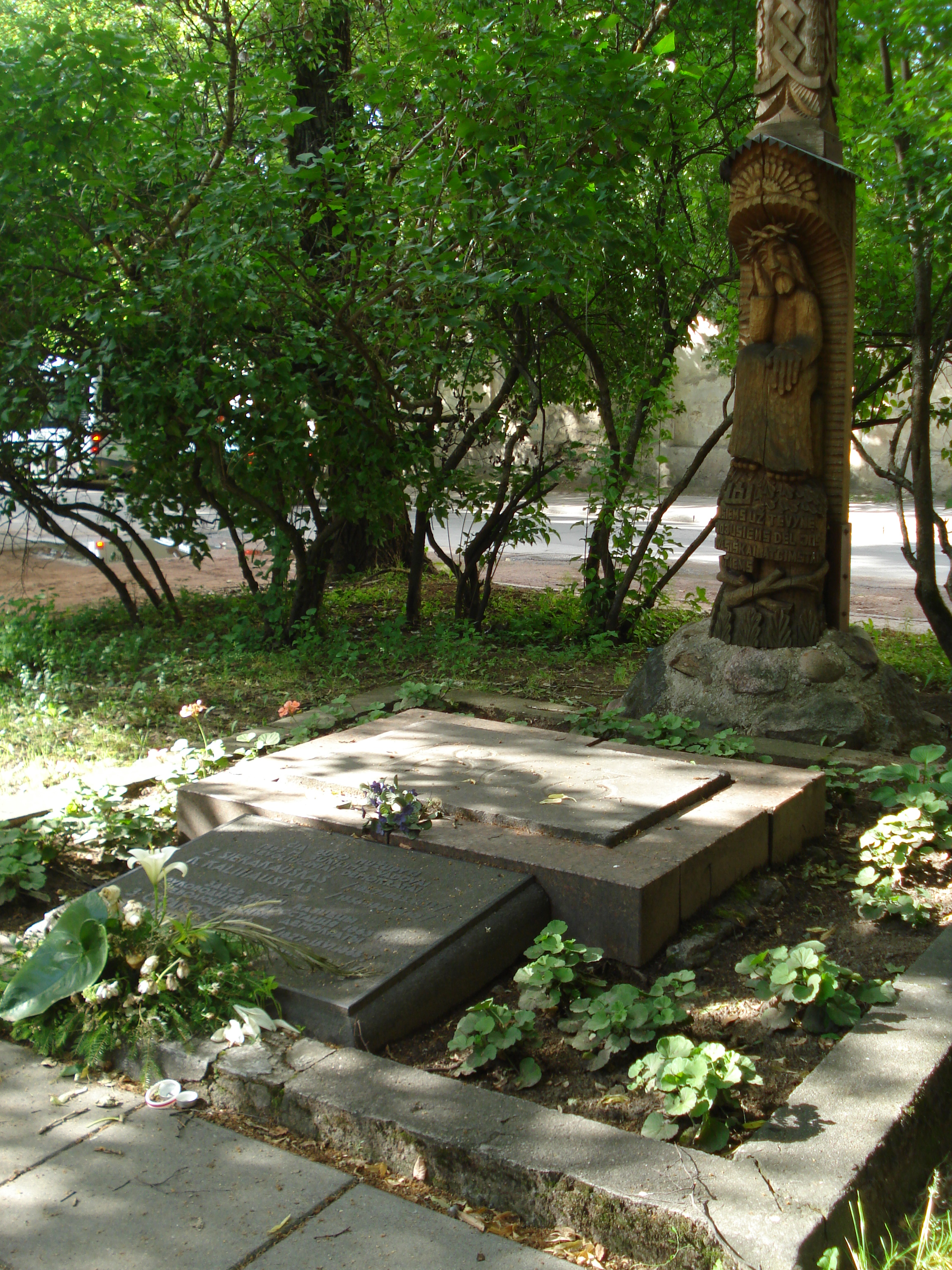
Memorial at the place of Kalinouski's execution in Vilnius, Lithuania

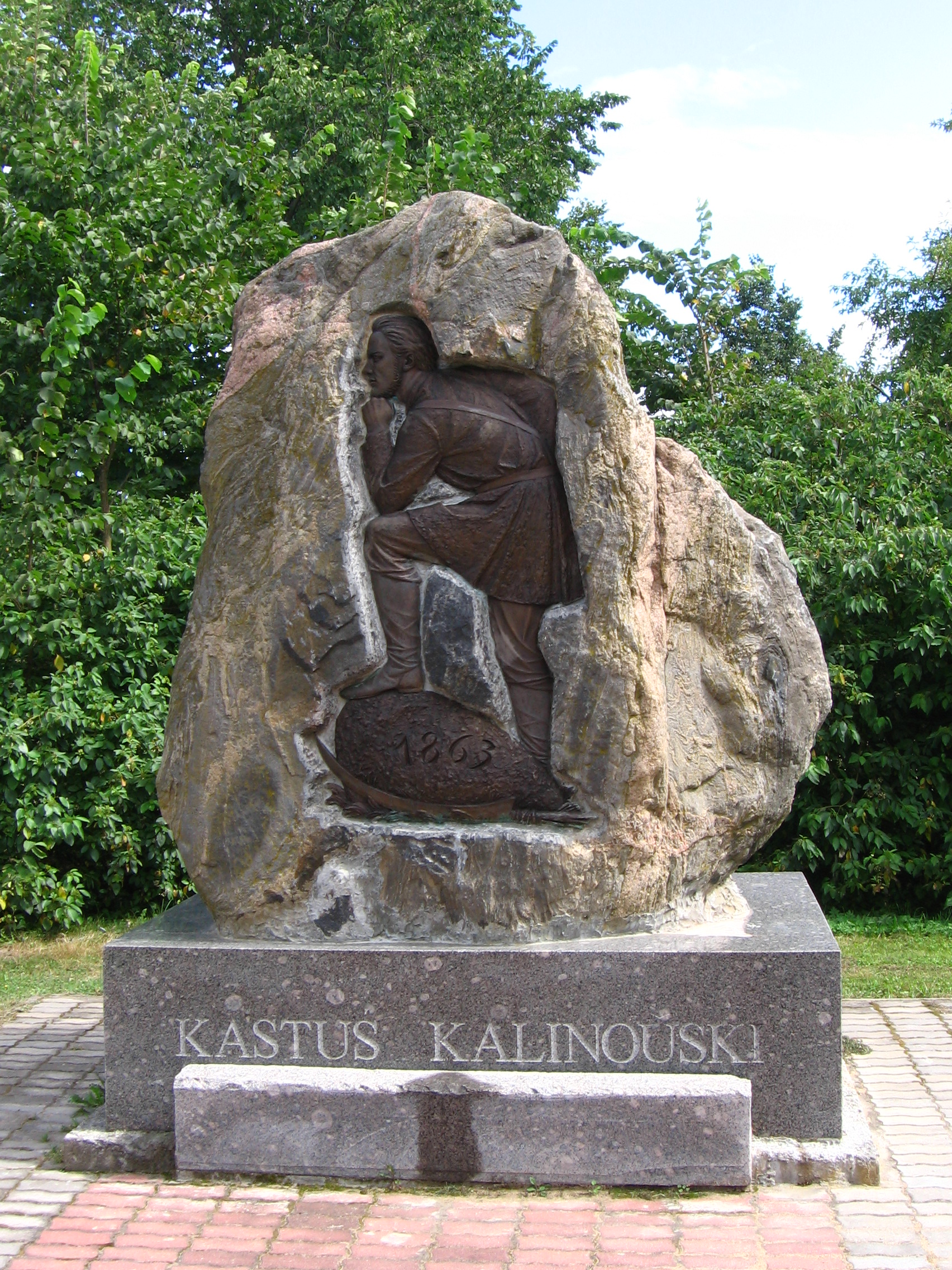
Monument in Šalčininkai, Lithuania

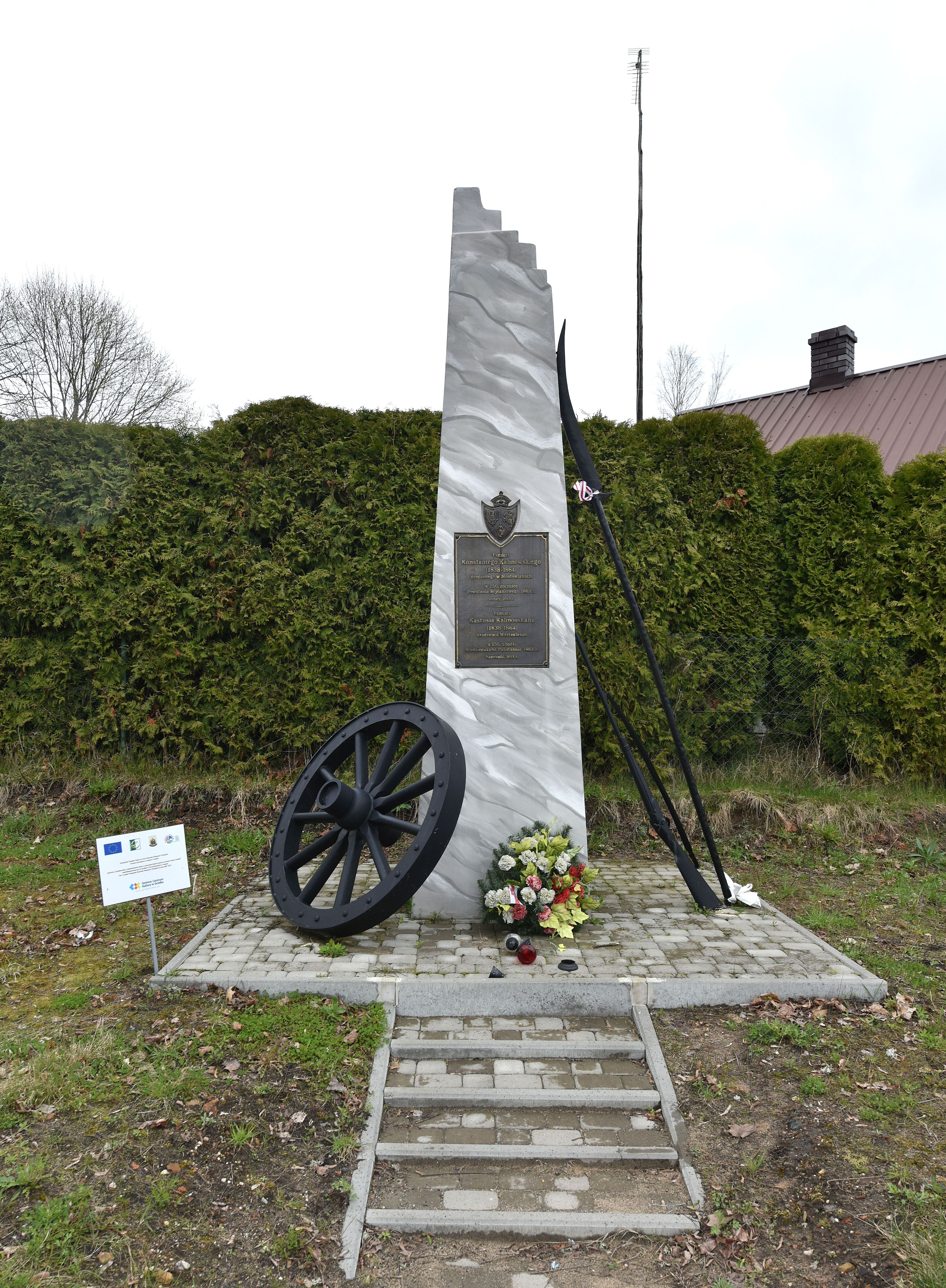
Monument in Mostowlany, Poland

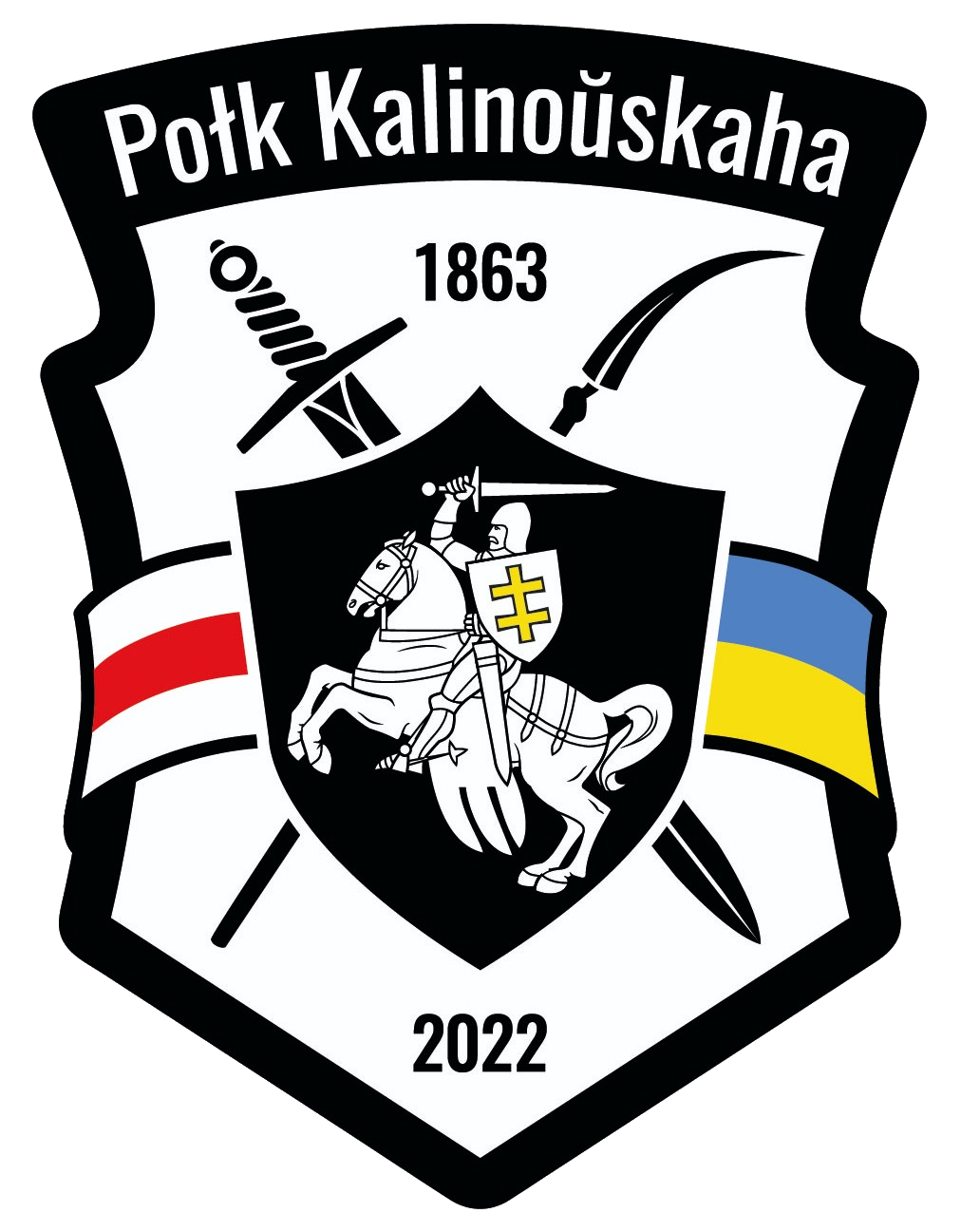
Logo of the Kastuś Kalinoŭski Regiment (2022)

== See also ==
- Belarusization (1920s–1930s)
- Belarusian nationalism
- Belarusian national revival since the 19th century
- "Long Live Belarus!", patriotic slogan
- Soft Belarusization under Lukashenko

== Related reading ==
- Zaprudnik, Jan; Bird, Thomas E. (1976). Peasant's Truth, the Tocsin of the 1863 Uprising. Vol. 14. New York: Zapisy Belarusian Institute of Arts and Sciences.
- Kalinoŭski, Kastuś (1980). The 1863 Uprising in Byelorussia: "Peasants' Truth" and "Letters from Beneath the Gallows. commentaries by Jan Zaprudnik and Thomas E. Bird. New York: Byelorussian Institute of Arts and Sciences, The Krecheuski Foundation.
- Horosko, Leo (1965). "Kastus Kalinouski: Leader of the National Uprising in Byelorussia 1863–64". The Journal of Belarusian Studies. I (I): 30–35. doi:10.30965/20526512-00101005.
