= Mostowlany =

Mostowlany Мостоўляны
- Village
- Orthodox church of Saint John the Evangelist
- Interactive map of Mostowlany
- Location within Poland
- Coordinates: 53°04′04″N 23°52′43″E
- Country: Poland
- Voivodeship: Podlaskie
- County: Białystok
- Gmina: Gródek

Mostowlany ([mɔstɔˈvlanɨ]; Belarusian: (locally) Мостоўляны, Mostoŭĺany; (Narkamaŭka) Мастаўляны, Mastaŭĺany; Lithuanian: Mastaulėnai) is a village in the administrative district of Gmina Gródek, within Białystok County, Podlaskie Voivodeship, in north-eastern Poland, close to the border with Belarus. It is inhabited by ethnic Belarusians of the Eastern Orthodox faith, who speak a local dialect of the Belarusian language.

== Notable people ==
- Konstanty Kalinowski (known in Belarus as Kalinoŭski; 1838–1864), a writer, journalist, lawyer and a leader of the Uprising of 1863.

== Sources ==
- Merkys, Vytautas (2018). "Konstantinas Kalinauskas". Universal Lithuanian Encyclopedia (in Lithuanian).
