= Grodnensky Uyezd =

Subdivision of the Grodno Governorate of the Russian Empire

Grodnensky Uyezd (Russian: Гродненский уезд) was one of the subdivisions of the Grodno Governorate of the Russian Empire. It was situated in the northern part of the governorate. Its administrative centre was Grodno.

== Demographics ==
At the time of the Russian Empire Census of 1897, Grodnensky Uyezd had a population of 204,854. Of these, 65.7% spoke Belarusian, 19.9% Yiddish, 6.2% Russian, 5.7% Polish, 1.4% Lithuanian, 0.4% Tatar, 0.3% German, 0.1% Chuvash and 0.1% Mari as their native language.
