= Zabiełło =

Zabiello is a Polonized variant of the Lithuanian surname Zabiela. Ukrainian form: Zabila (uk:Забіла), Russified: Zabela. Notable people with the surname include:

- Józef Zabiełło (1750–1794), Polish–Lithuanian nobleman
- Szymon Zabiełło (1750–1824), Polish-Lithuanian nobleman

== See also ==
- Zabello
- Sabella, Sabela, Sabelo, a different, Italian origin
