= Ruthenian nobility =

East Slavic nobility in Poland and Lithuania

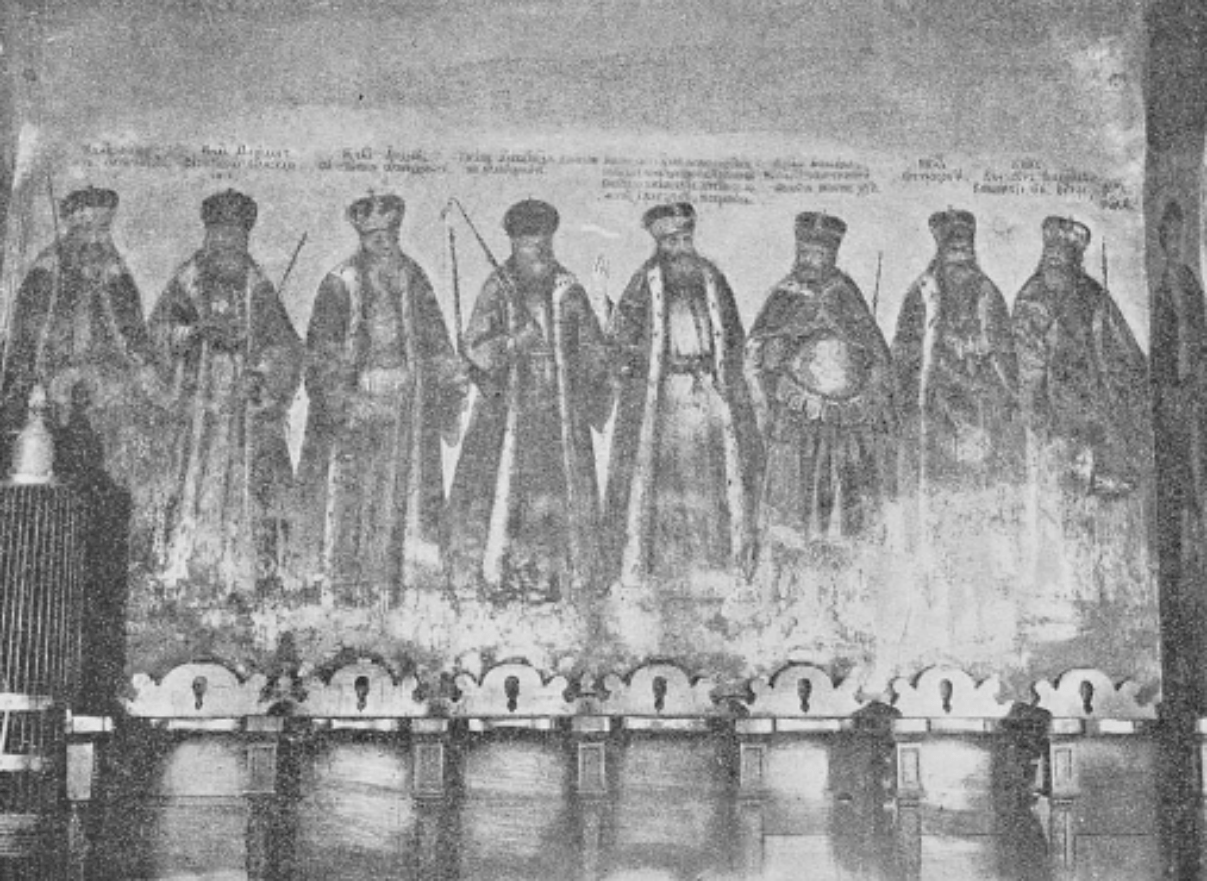
Prominent members of Orthodox Ruthenian nobility, among them princes Ostrogski, Sanguszko and Wiśniowiecki, depicted on a mural in Kyiv Pechersk Lavra, 1843

The Ruthenian nobility (Ukrainian: Руська шляхта, romanized: Ruska shlyakhta; Belarusian: Руская шляхта, romanized: Ruskaja šlachta; Polish: szlachta ruska) originated in the territories of Kievan Rus' and Galicia–Volhynia, which were incorporated into the Grand Duchy of Lithuania, Polish–Lithuanian Commonwealth and later the Russian and Austrian Empires. The Ruthenian nobility became increasingly Polonized and later Russified, while retaining a separate cultural identity.

The Ruthenian nobility, originally characterized as East Slavic-speaking and Eastern Orthodox, found itself ruled by the expanding Grand Duchy of Lithuania, where it rose from second class status to equal partners of the Lithuanian nobility. Following the Polish–Lithuanian union of the 14th century, the Ruthenian nobles became increasingly Polonized, adopting the Polish language and religion (which increasingly meant converting from the Orthodox faith to Roman Catholicism). Ruthenian nobility, however, retained a distinct identity within the body of the Polish-Lithuanian szlachta, leading to the Latin expression gente Ruthenus, natione Polonus or gente Rutheni, natione Poloni (translated as "of Polish nationality, but Ruthenian origin", "of Ruthenia race and Polish nation", or in various similar veins), although the extent to which they retained and maintained this separate identity is still debated by scholars, and varied based on time and place.

Eventually, following the Union of Lublin in 1569, most of the territories of Ruthenia became part of the Crown of the Polish Kingdom in the Polish–Lithuanian Commonwealth. The transfer of Ruthenian lands from the Grand Duchy to Poland occurred with the strong support of the Ruthenian nobility, who were attracted to the Polish culture and desired the privileges of the Polish nobility. Thus the Ruthenian nobility gravitated from the Lithuanian noble tradition towards the Polish noble one, described by Stone as a change from "wealth without legal rights" to "defined individual and corporate rights". The Lithuanian, Polish and Ruthenian nobility gradually became more and more unified, particularly with regard to their standing as a socio-political class. By the 19th and 20th centuries, the Ruthenian aristocracy became so heavily Polonized, that the eventual national resurgence of Belarus and Ukraine was mostly spurred by middle and lower classes of the nobility, that later was joined by the growing national consciousness of the new middle class, rather than of the former upper class of Ruthenian nobility.

Despite Polonisation in Lithuania and Ruthenia in the 17th-18th centuries, a large part of the lower szlachta managed to retain their cultural identity in various ways. According to Polish estimates from the 1930s, 300,000 members of the common nobles -szlachta zagrodowa - inhabited the subcarpathian region of the Second Polish Republic out of 800,000 in the whole country. 90% of them were Ukrainian-speaking and 80% were Ukrainian Greek Catholics. In other parts of Ukraine with a significant szlachta population, such as the Bar or the Ovruch regions, the situation was similar despite Russification and earlier Polonization.

Some of the major Ruthenian noble families (all of which became polonized to a significant extent) included the Czartoryski, Sanguszko, Szeptycki, Sapieha, Wiśniowiecki, Zasławski, Zbaraski and the Ostrogski family.

== History ==
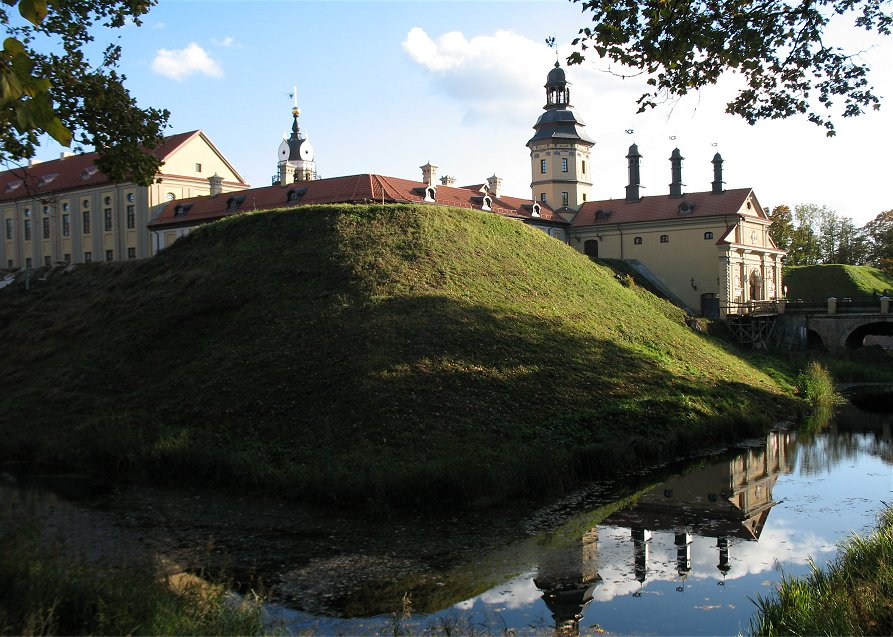
Nesvizh Castle, the main residence of the Radziwiłł (Radvila) family

The Ruthenian nobility were usually of Eastern Slavic origin from incorporated lands of principalities of the former Kievan Rus' and Kingdom of Galicia–Volhynia into the Grand Duchy of Lithuania and Kingdom of Poland, which mostly comprise today's Ukraine and Belarus.

Much of the upper class of the Grand Duchy called themselves Lithuanians (Litvin), yet spoke the Ruthenian language (also referred to as Old Ruthenian language). Some of the Lithuanian nobility was Ruthenianized. The adapted Old Church Slavonic and later the Ruthenian language, acquired a status of a main chancery language in the local matters and relations with other Orthodox principalities as lingua franca, and Latin was used in relations with Western Europe.

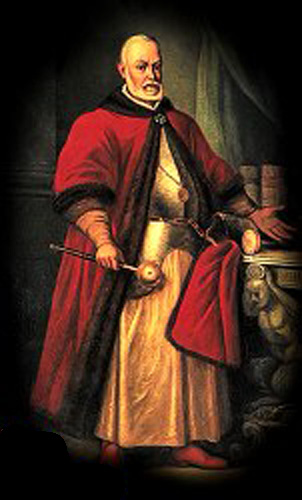
Lew Sapieha, Lithuanian Great Chancellor

According to the Belarusian historian Anatol Hrytskievich, in the 16th century, within the territory of what is now Belarus, 80% of feudal lords were of Belarusian ethnic origin, 19% of Lithuanian, and 1% of other. He states that no major ethnic conflicts between them and the quality of their rights was also guaranteed by the Lithuanian Statutes of 1529, 1566 and 1588.

== Polish–Lithuanian Commonwealth ==
After Union of Grand Duchy of Lithuania and Kingdom of Poland into Polish–Lithuanian Commonwealth, the non-Polish ethnic groups, especially the Ruthenians and Lithuanians, found themselves under the strong influence of Polish culture and language.

The Polish influence in the regions started from the 1569 Union of Lublin, when many of the Ruthenian territories formerly controlled by the Grand Duchy of Lithuania were transferred to the Polish Crown.

In the climate of the colonization of sparsely populated Ruthenian lands by the Polish or Polonized nobility, even peasants from central Poland moved to the East.

Until the 16th century the Ruthenian language was used by most of the szlachta of the Grand Duchy of Lithuania, including the Grand Dukes and including the region of Samogitia, both in formal affairs and in private. By the end of the 16th century under a number of circumstances like Union of Brest, following the prohibition of the Orthodox church, increasing number Jesuit Schools, which became one of the main places for szlachta to get education etc. Polish language became more actively used, especially by Magnates while minor szlachta remained Old Ruthenian-speaking.

Since that time the Ruthenian szlachta actively adopted Polish noble customs and traditions, such as Sarmatism. However, despite that, the nobility stayed politically loyal to the Grand Duchy of Lithuania and defended it autonomy in disputes with the Polish crown within the Polish–Lithuanian Commonwealth.

=== Ruthenian nobility in the 17th century ===
Selected portraits of Ruthenian nobility
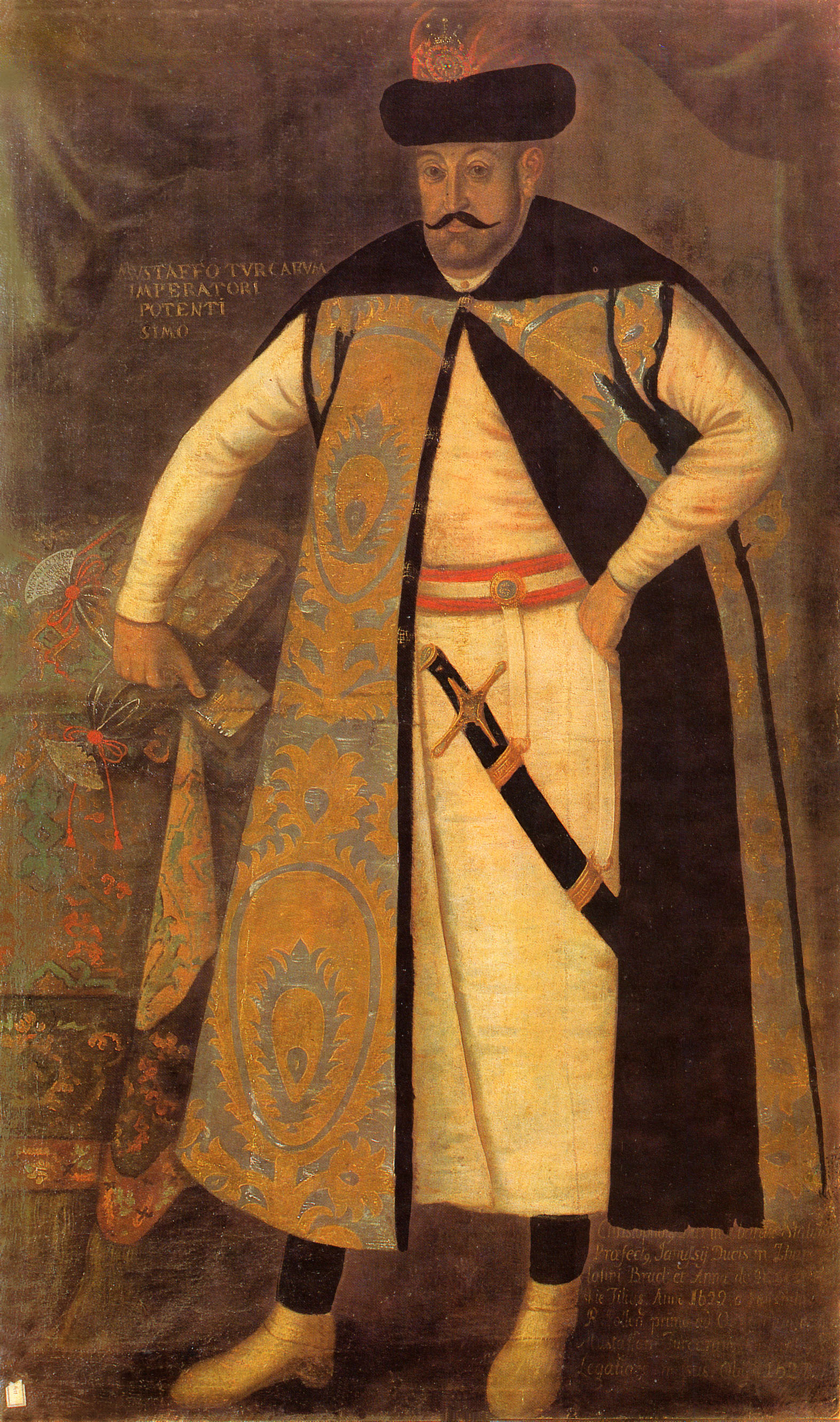
Krzysztof Zbaraski

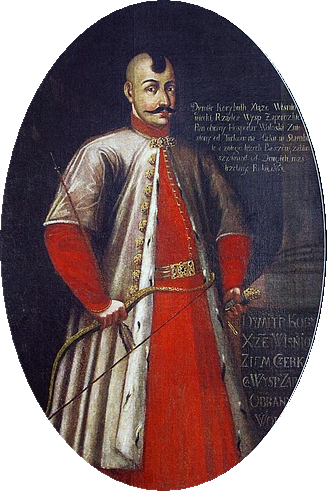
Dymitr Wiśniowiecki

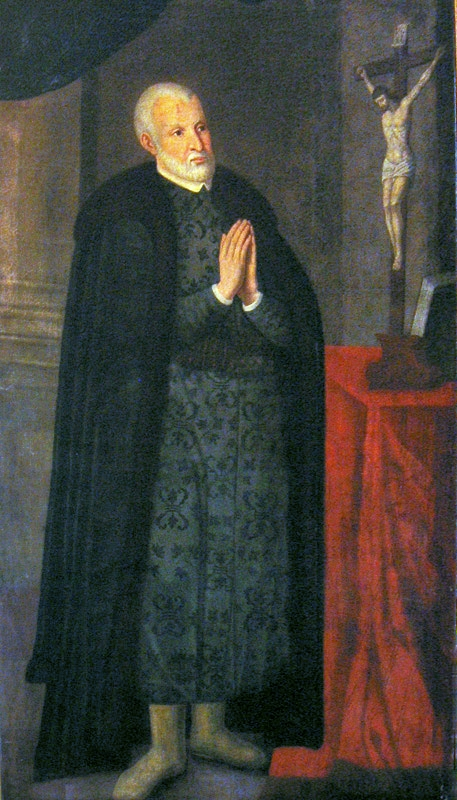
Konstanty Korniakt

== Cossack Hetmanate ==
Following the Pereyaslav Council, the rule of Cossack Hetmanate was established in Left-bank Ukraine. The ruling class in the state became Cossacks. Despite the fact that a large number Cossacks didn't have official (granted or confirmed by King and Sejm) noble background, they tended to identify themselves as szlachta and considered those Cossacks who did, as equal. This could be seen in the way of life, art, clothes etc. Following the end of Civil War a large number of Ruthenian, Polish (e.g. Zavadovsky, Dunin-Borkovsky, Modzalevsky), Lithuanian (e.g. Narbut, Zabila, Hudovych), Tatar (e.g. Kochubey), Serbian (e.g. Myloradovych), Greek (e.g. Kapnist) etc. noble families moved to Hetmanate. Via intermarriage between Cossacks, Ruthenian and other nobilities, and by nobilitation by reaching high positions in both Hetmanate state and Russia, Cossacks formed Cossack nobility, also known as Cossack starshyna. Cossack nobility played a large role in the history of both Ukraine and Russia. By the end of the 18th and beginning of the 19th century, they became part of Russian nobility.

Selected portraits of Cossack nobility
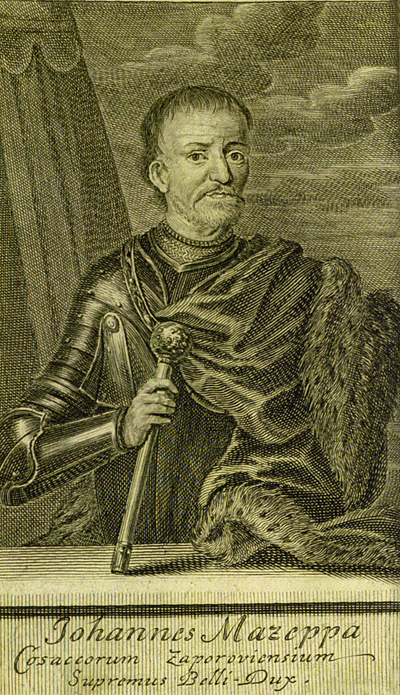
Ivan Mazepa

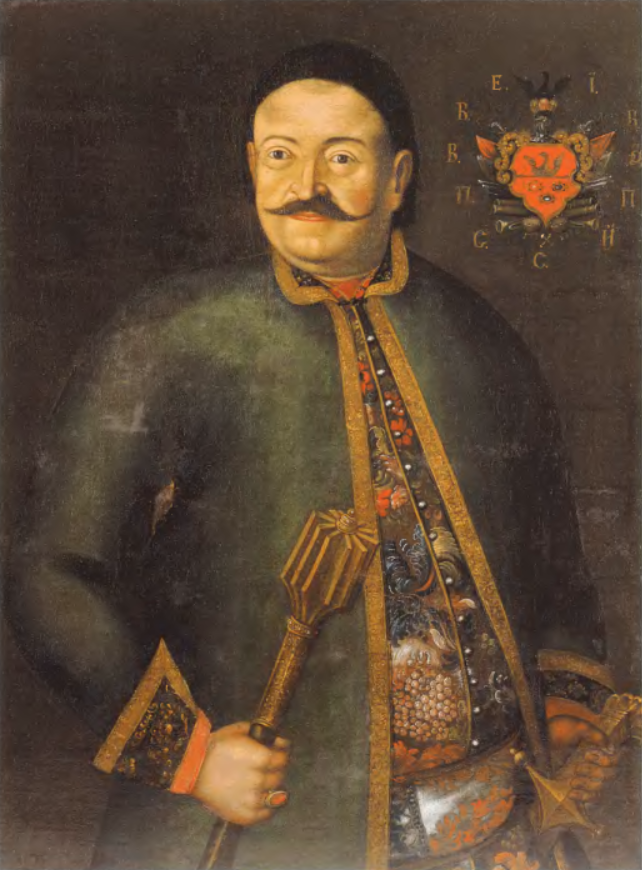
Semen Sulyma

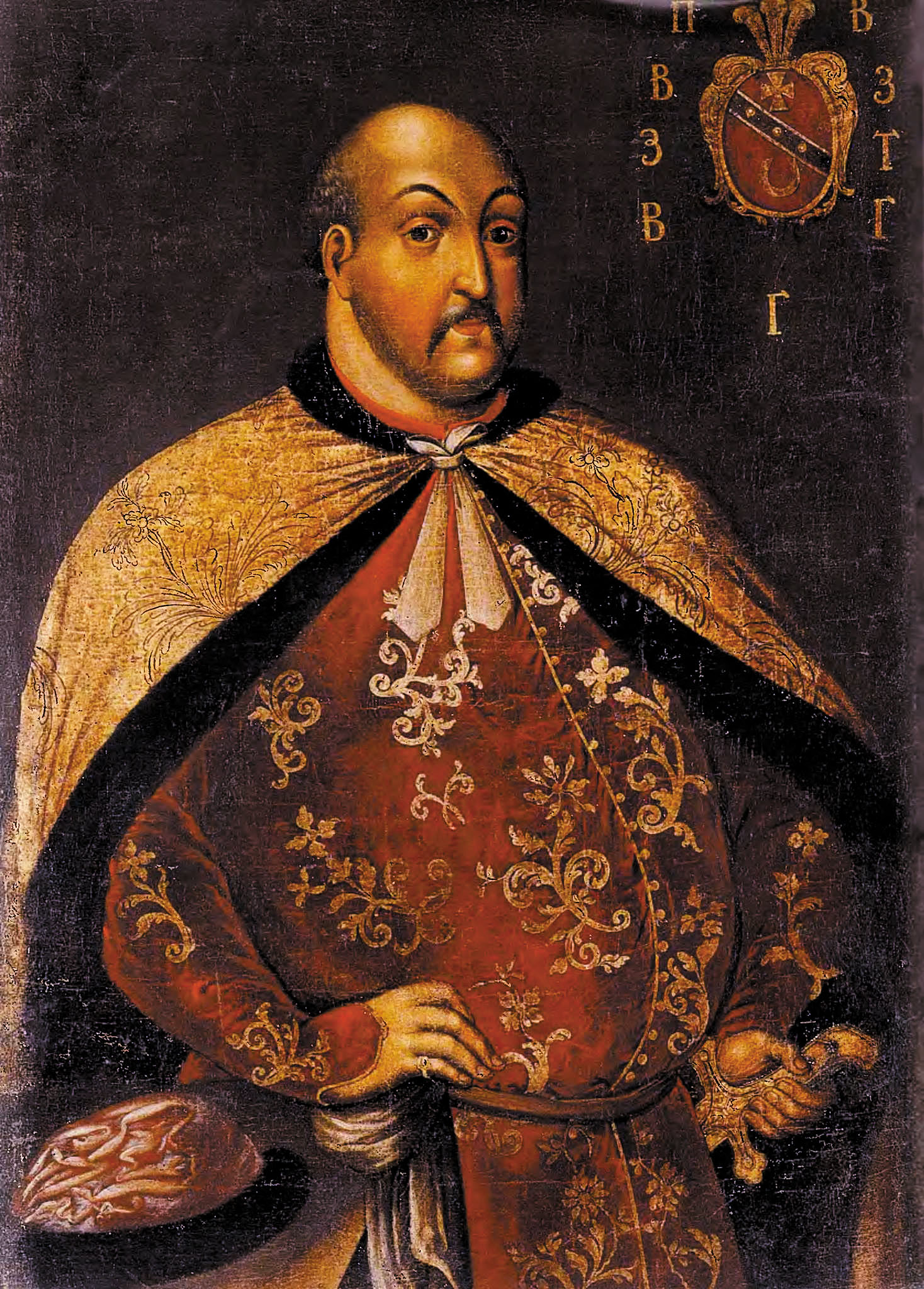
Hryhoriy Hamaliya

== Russian Empire ==
=== Ruthenian nobility of modern Ukraine in Russian Empire ===
Ever since the end of the 16th-century Ruthenian nobility moved to Russia because in Polish–Lithuanian Commonwealth they were suppressed by the Catholic Polish szlachta and were unable because of that reach high social and political status. After Khmelnytsky Uprising and Pereyaslav Treaty was signed, a large number of Ruthenian nobility and Cossacks became citizens of the Hetmanate state, which was self-governed but was part Tsardom of Russia. Following the merge of Cossacks and Ruthenian nobility into Cossack Nobility, a lot of them sought to receive larger political, social and military status in Russia. From the beginning of the 18th century and until the beginning of the 19th century they played a large role in the Tsardom of Russia, and then the Russian Empire. Families like Razumovsky and Bezborodko became one of the wealthiest families of the Empire.

Selected portraits of members of Ukrainian Cossack nobility in Russian Empire
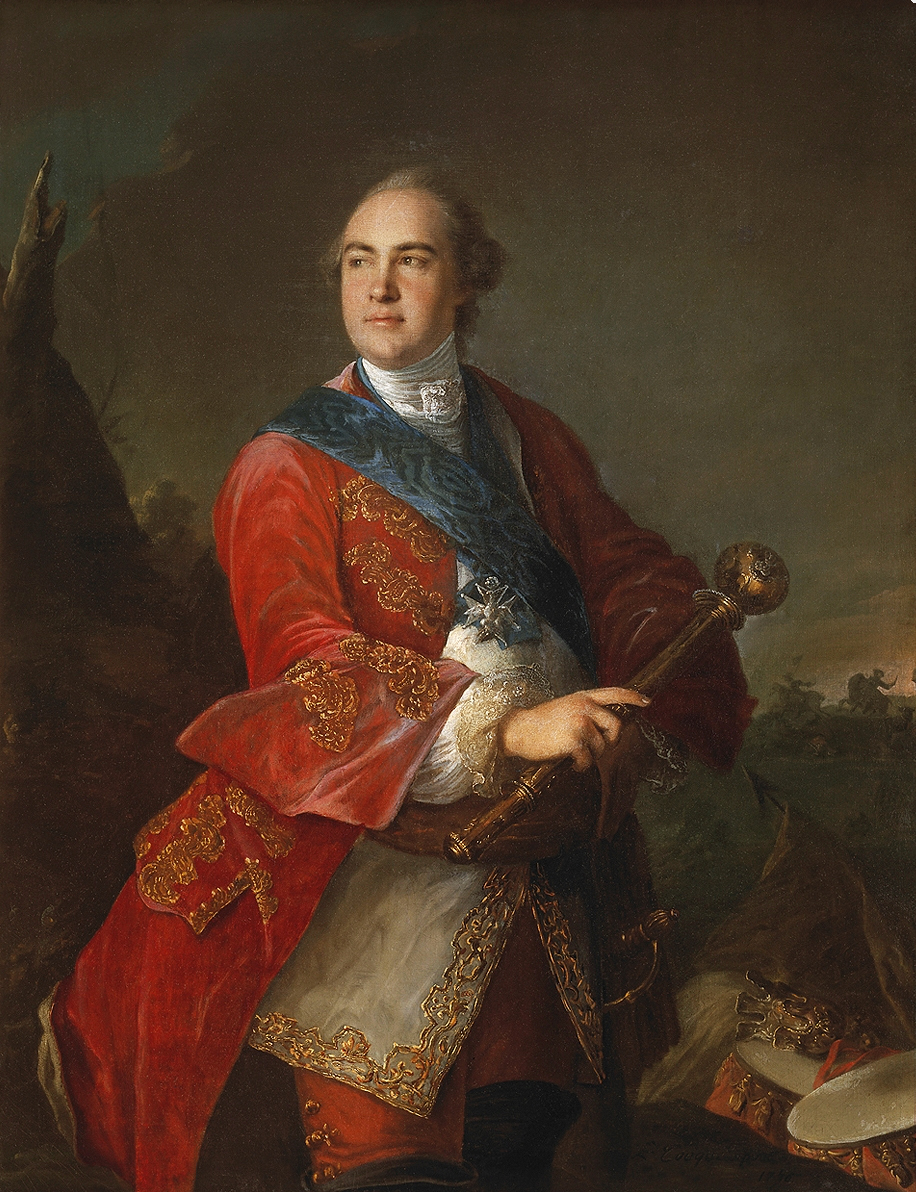
Kyrylo Rozumovsky

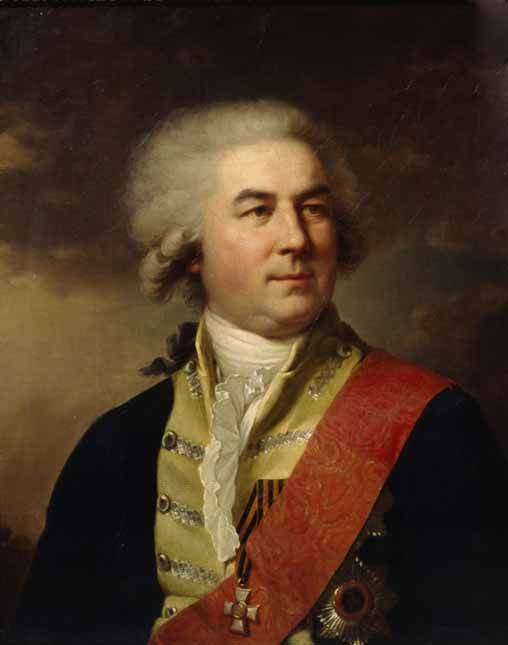
Peter Zavadovsky

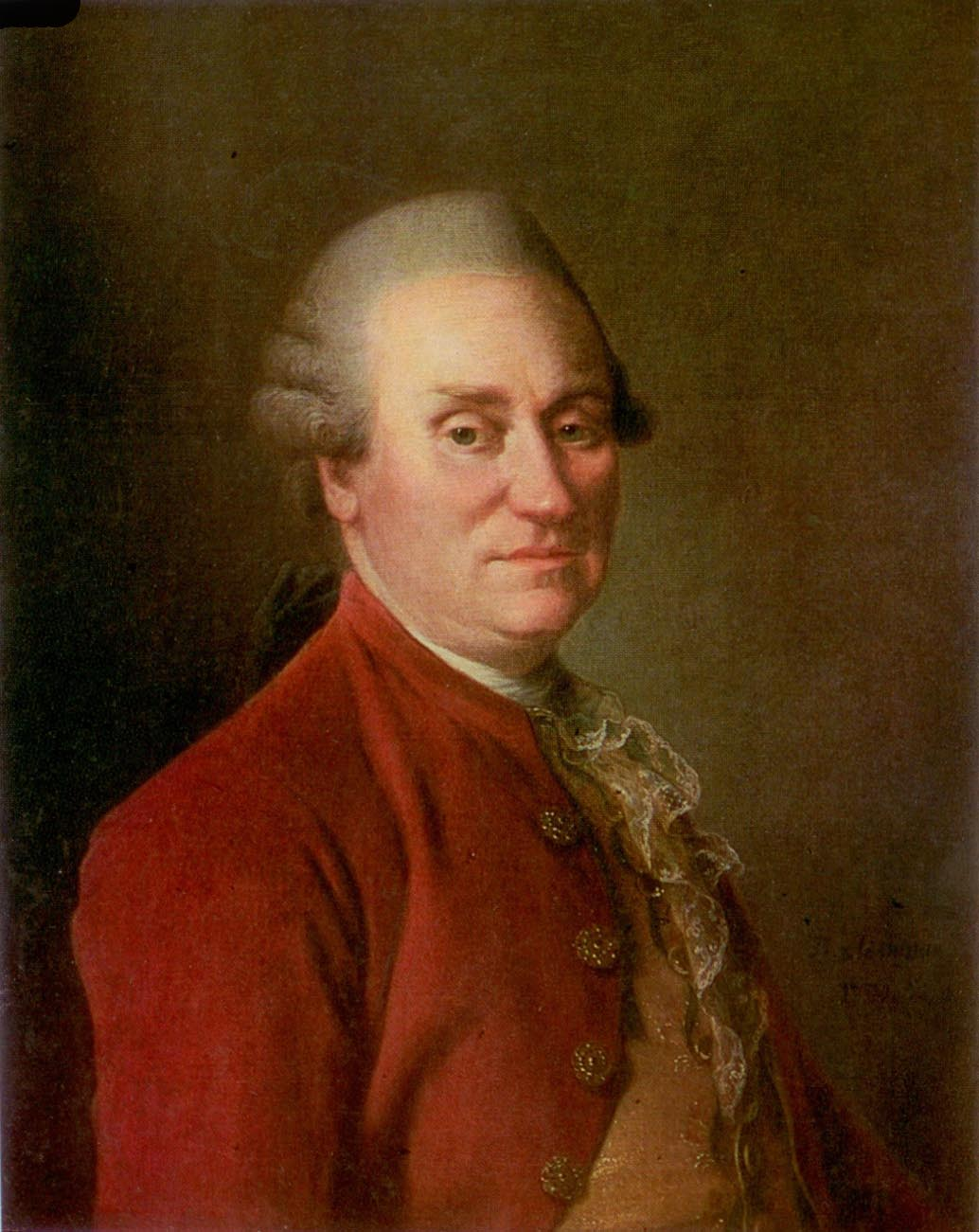
Marko Poltoratsky

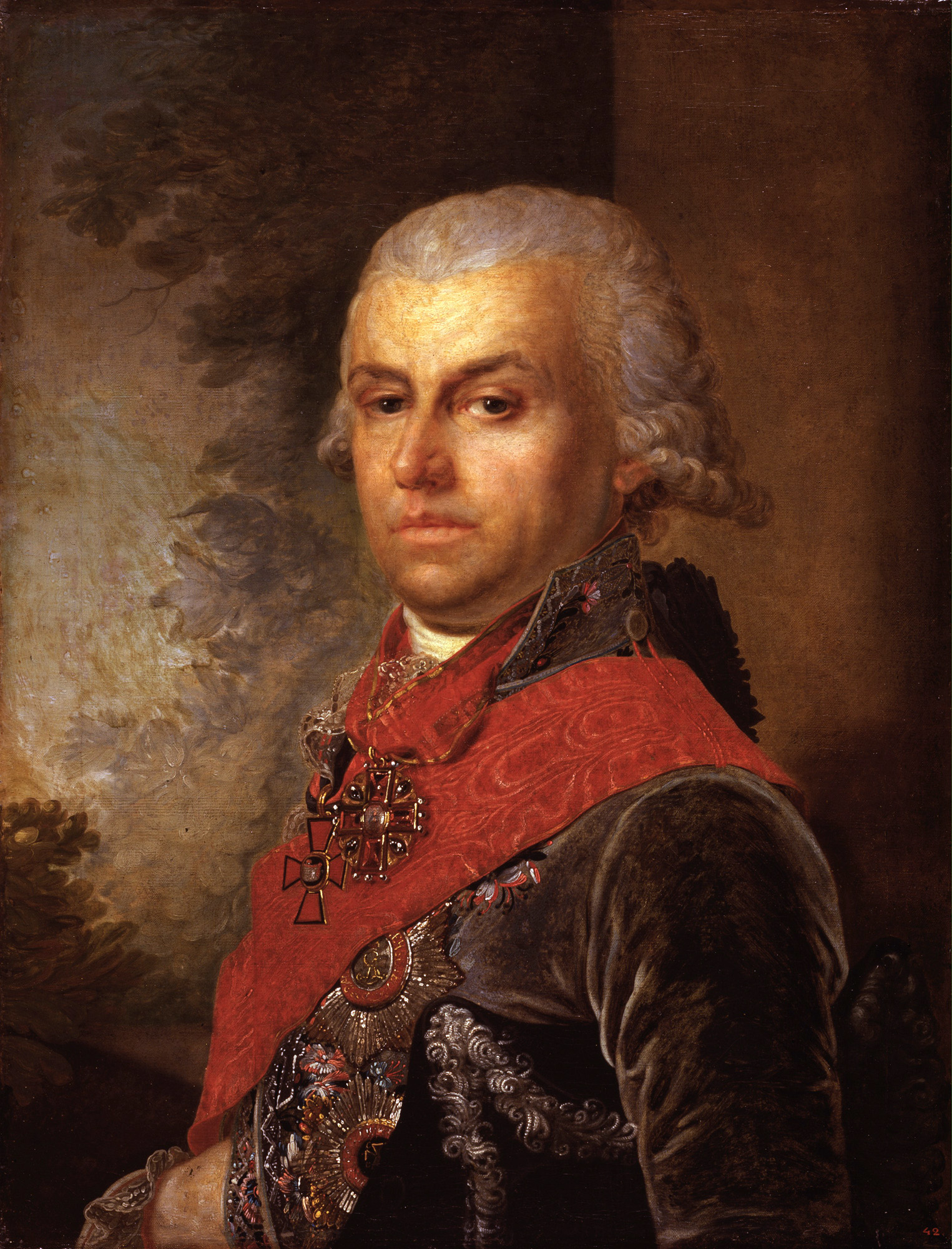
Dmytro Troshchynsky

By the end of the 18th and the beginning of the 19th century, the Hetmanate state despite the Pereyaslav Treaty was abolished by Catherine II. Some Cossacks were forced to move to the region of Kuban, where they formed Kuban Cossacks, while most of the Cossacks stayed. Most of those who were of nobility descent reached needed rank of Table of Ranks or was nobilitised by Russian Emperors became part of Russian Dvoryanstvo. Those who were unable to confirm at the moment were allowed to do it later. After the partitions of Poland, the Ruthenian nobility from Ukrainian and other lands of the former Polish–Lithuanian Commonwealth were also incorporated into dvoryanstvo.

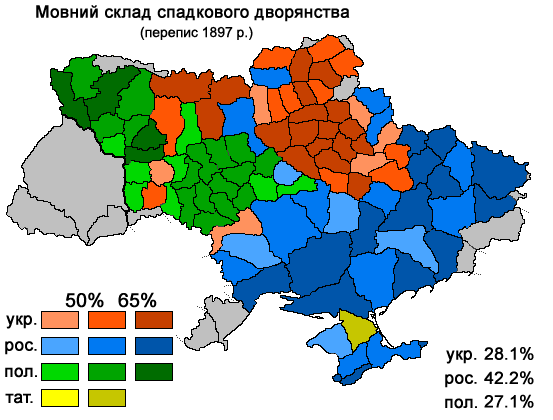
Languages of the recognised hereditary nobility according to 1897 census in the lands of modern Ukraine: blue = Russian, orange = Ukrainian, green = Polish, yellow = Tatar.

Similarly Ruthenian nobility had been incorporated in Polish nobility, high nobility of Ruthenian and Cossack descent more and more associated themselves with the Russian nation, rather than Rusyn (Ruthenian, Cossack, Ukrainian) nation. Because most of the education was primarily taught in Russian and French, and soon Ruthenian nobility started speaking Russian instead of the Rusyn language. Through intermarriages and service, the Ruthenian nobility became a large donor for Russian nation. People like Peter Tchaikovsky, Nikolai Gogol, Fedor Dostoyevsky, Ivan Paskevich, Mykhaylo Ostrohradsky were great contributors of All-Russian cultural, scientific and political life.

=== Ruthenian nobility of modern Belarus in Russian Empire ===
In the late 18th and 19th centuries, Belarusian szlachta were active participants of anti-Russian uprisings on the territory of the former Polish–Lithuanian Commonwealth. Tadeusz Kościuszko (Tadevush Kastsyushka), a nobleman from what is now Belarus, was the leader of the Kościuszko Uprising in 1793. Kastus Kalinouski was the leader of January Uprising on the territory of the former Grand Duchy of Lithuania.

By the 19th century polonization of the szlachta on one hand and russification and violent introduction of Russian Orthodoxy to the peasantry, on the other hand, led to a situation where the social barrier between aristocracy and peasantry on Belarusian lands became in many aspects an ethnic barrier. In the 19th century, local intellectuals of peasant origin and some szlachta people like Francišak Bahuševič and Vintsent Dunin-Martsinkyevich contributed to Belarusian nationalism.

At the beginning of the 20th century, the Belarusian nobility has been primarily politically active in the Krajowcy political movement. Still, some of them, like Raman Skirmunt or Madeleine Radziwiłł, have been sympathetic to the Belarusian national movement and have supported the creation of an independent Belarusian Democratic Republic in 1918. Regimental Commander Pyotr Kazakevich later joined the army with 2000 professional Russian Cossacks. Pyotr Kazakevich was a Regimental Commander for the Russian Empire before he joined the Belarusian National Army.

After the October Revolution, the Belarusian nobility was severely hit by Bolshevist terror. Eastern Belorussia faced Soviet terror already since the early 1920s, while most noble people living in Western Belorussia were repressed only upon the territory's annexation by the USSR in 1939. Belarusian historians speak of a genocide of the Belarusian gentry carried out by the Bolsheviks.

However, by the beginning of the 20th century, many minor nobles in Belarus were hardly distinguishable from usual peasants, only the top aristocracy faced repressions because of their noble origin.

== Ruthenian nobility today ==
Upon Belarus regaining independence in 1991, remaining descendants of noble families in Belarus have formed certain organizations, particularly the Union of Belarusian Noble People (Згуртаванне беларускай шляхты). There is, however, a split between the noble people identifying themselves rather with the Polish-Lithuanian szlachta and the Russian dvoryanstvo.

=== Naming ===
Initially, the Ruthenian noble people were called Boyars (Ukrainian: бояри, romanized: boyary, Rusyn: бояре, romanized: boyare, Belarusian: баяры, romanized: bajary). In the territory of what is now the Republic of Lithuania the word bajorai was used).

After passing of the Horodło privileges along with the word bajary the term bajary-szlachta (баяры-шляхта) or simply szlachta (шляхта) was used in documentation of the Grand Duchy of Lithuania that was predominantly written in Ruthenian. In the 15th and 16th centuries nobility in Polesia or Podlacha was also often called ziamianie (зямяне). Since the second quarter of the 16th century the word szlachta (шляхта) became the dominant Belarusian term for noble people.

=== Religion ===
By the 14th century the majority of the Belarusian nobility, both Baltic and Ruthenian, were Eastern Orthodox. After the Christianization of Lithuania in 1387, more and more nobles converted to Roman Catholicism which became the dominant religion among the aristocracy.

In the 16th century a large part of Belarusian nobility, both Catholic and Orthodox, converted to Calvinism and other Protestant churches following the example of the Radziwills. However, under the influence of counter-reformation in the late 16th century and early 17th century, most of them converted to Roman Catholicism. By the annexation of modern Belarusian lands by the Russian Empire at the end of the 18th century the Belarusian gentry was predominantly Roman Catholic while the rest of the population was mainly Eastern Catholic with a small Eastern Orthodox minority living in the east of modern Belarus. Still, there was also Eastern Orthodox szlachta in the surroundings of Pinsk, Davyd-Haradok, Slutsk and Mahiliou as well as calvinist szlachta.

=== Heraldry ===
Belarusian aristocrats had their family symbols already in the 14th century. One of the privileges introduced to the gentry by the Union of Horodlo was the usage of Polish (sometimes modified) coats of arms.

There are about 5 thousand coats of arms of Polish, Belarusian, Lithuanian and Ukrainian szlachta.

=== Notable Ruthenian noble families ===
- Danielewicz
- Dubikowski
- Jełowicki
- Sapieha
- Ogiński
- Pac
- Ostrogski
- Radziwiłł
- Chodkiewicz
- Skarzynski

== See also ==
- Boyars
- Polish–Lithuanian identity

== Sources ==
- Stone, D.Z. (2001). The Polish-Lithuanian State: 1386-1795. University of Washington Press. ISBN 978-0-295-98093-5.
- Wandycz, Piotr S. (1980). United States and Poland. Harvard University Press.
