= Great Lithuanians =

Lithuanians of the Grand Duchy of Lithuania

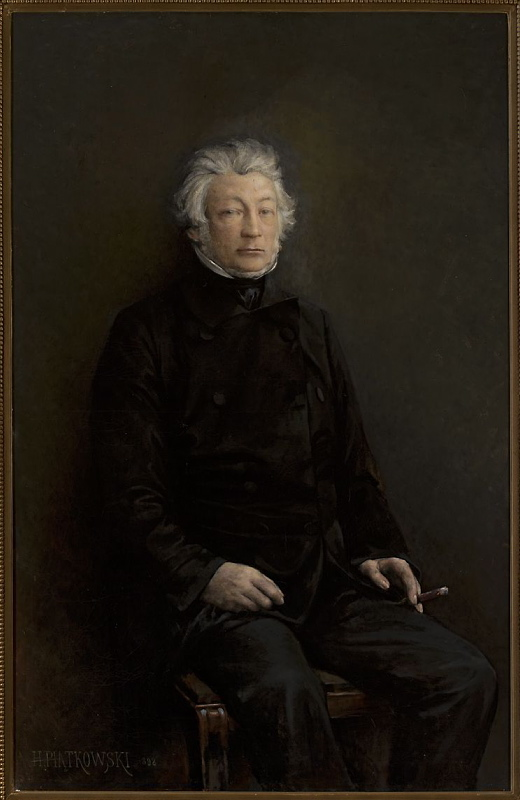
Adam Mickiewicz of the Poraj coat of arms, a historical Lithuanian

Great Lithuanians, also historical Lithuanians, or Old Lithuanians is a term most often used in Historiography to distinguish present-day Lithuanians from the Lithuanians of the Grand Duchy of Lithuania.

A “historical Lithuanian” was someone inhabiting “historical Lithuania”, i.e. the former Grand Duchy of Lithuania, of noble or princely origin. In this sense, “historical Lithuanians” include, for example, Grand Duke Gediminas and the boyar Mikołaj Radziwiłłowicz.

In the era of the Polish–Lithuanian Commonwealth, “historical Lithuanians” were still most often (though not always) members of the noble and princely estate, but already raised in Polish culture and using the Polish language. They generally professed Catholicism (or other Christian denominations) and supported the traditional ideology of the Polish–Lithuanian union.

Examples of historical Lithuanians include such well-known figures as Stanisław Cat Mackiewicz, his brother Józef Mackiewicz, Adam Mickiewicz, Konstanty Kalinowski, Melchior Wańkowicz, Czesław Miłosz, Tadeusz Kościuszko, Józef Piłsudski, and many other eminent individuals. In terms of ethnic origin, none of the above were ethnically Polish, but Lithuanian or Ruthenian. Their choice of Polish national self-identification made them “historical Lithuanians”.

== Historical background ==
Present-day Lithuania with the administrative divisions (governorates) of the former Russian Empire (1867–1914).

In the 1860s, in the lands of the then-nonexistent Lithuania partitioned among empires series of significant social changes took place. The abolition of serfdom and the enfranchisement of peasants, along with the repressions that followed the failure of the January Uprising, triggered far-reaching social transformations in the region.

The economic and political position of the nobility undermined by deportations, indemnities, and confiscations was clearly weakened. The imperial authorities increasingly targeted Poles (including "historical Lithuanians") and intensified repressions against the Catholic Church, regarded as a bastion of Polishness in the western governorates of the empire. Among other measures, Catholics were deprived of the right to purchase land.

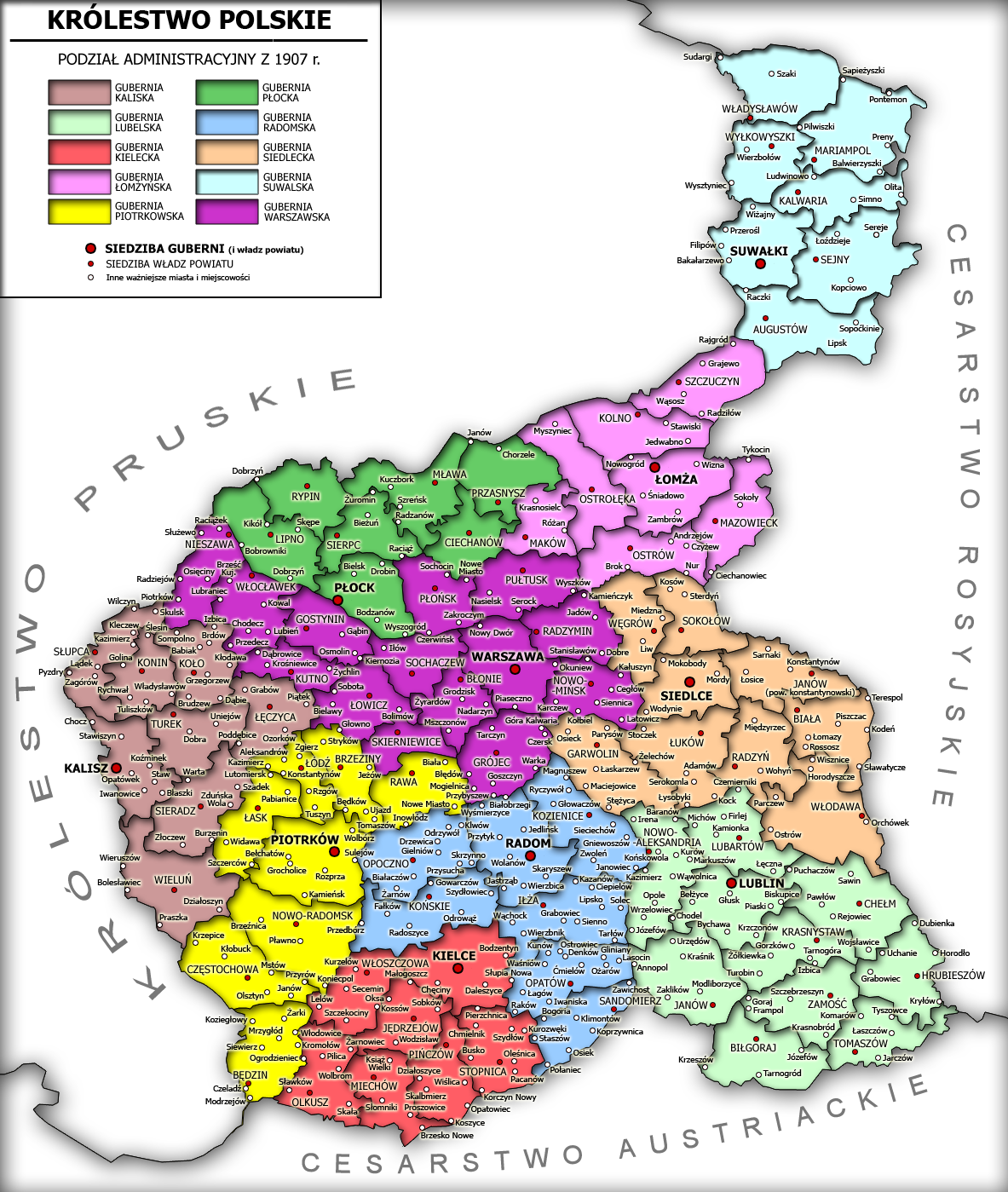
Administrative division of Congress Poland

In the Suwałki Governorate, which lay within Congress Poland, some decrees issued by the tsarist authorities did not apply, resulting in fewer constraints on social and economic life. In this governorate, where the majority of the population were Lithuanian peasants, the Lithuanian language was introduced as a subject in some schools. The authorities of the Warsaw School District also awarded nine scholarships to universities in Moscow and St. Petersburg for peasants from this region. In the Kaunas area, similar efforts were made to identify socially active individuals among "the people" (peasants) and offer them opportunities for advancement within the state apparatus. In this way, the imperial administration sought to create a new stratum of "popular" intelligentsia loyal to Russia and opposed to the Polish-noble tradition.

This policy was both cynical and inconsistent. In 1864, officials banned Lithuanian-language publications printed in the Latin alphabet, promoting instead printing in Cyrillic. The aim was to foster the mental and civic Russification of young "Samogitians" (i.e., modern Lithuanians), who, in the authorities' view, could continue to use their language provided it was written in a different script. A completely different policy was pursued toward the Belarusians. The Belarusian (in fact, Ruthenian) population of parts of White Ruthenia, whom the authorities regarded simply as Russians, as well as Catholics in the Vilnius region, were harshly suppressed for any manifestations of national or linguistic distinctiveness.

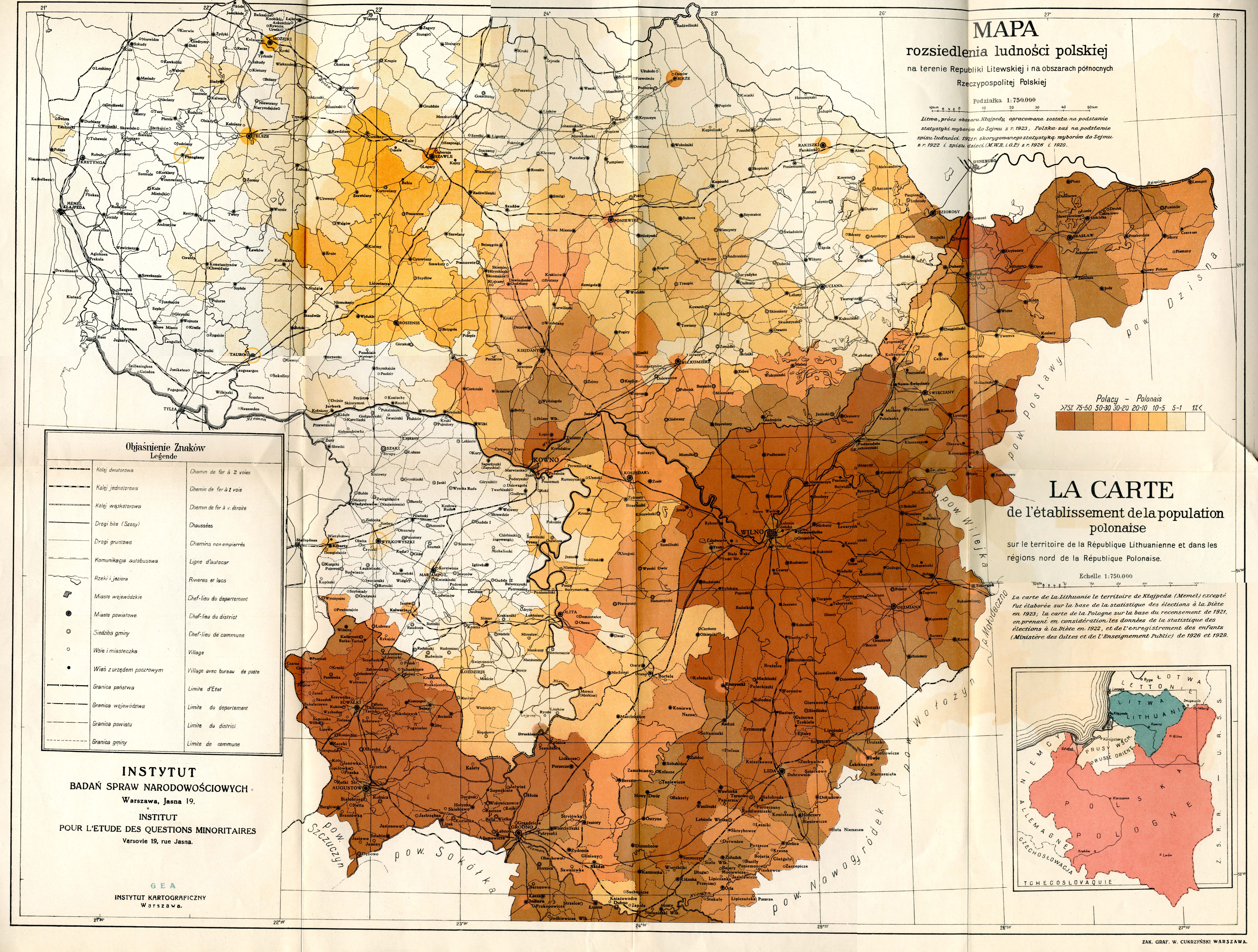
Distribution of the Polish population in Lithuania proper (1929)

Changes in ethnically Lithuanian villages—especially relative economic stabilization and new career opportunities—led to a growing number of peasant youths entering secondary schools by the 1870s. Although these schools officially promoted a Russian spirit, the atmosphere among students, mostly from the local intelligentsia and landed gentry, was paradoxically imbued with Polish patriotism and noble traditions. Private educational initiatives run by the gentry further reinforced Polish identity. In informal schools for "the people" established at manor houses, instruction was usually in Polish, and less often in the local "Samogitian dialect", i.e., modern Lithuanian.

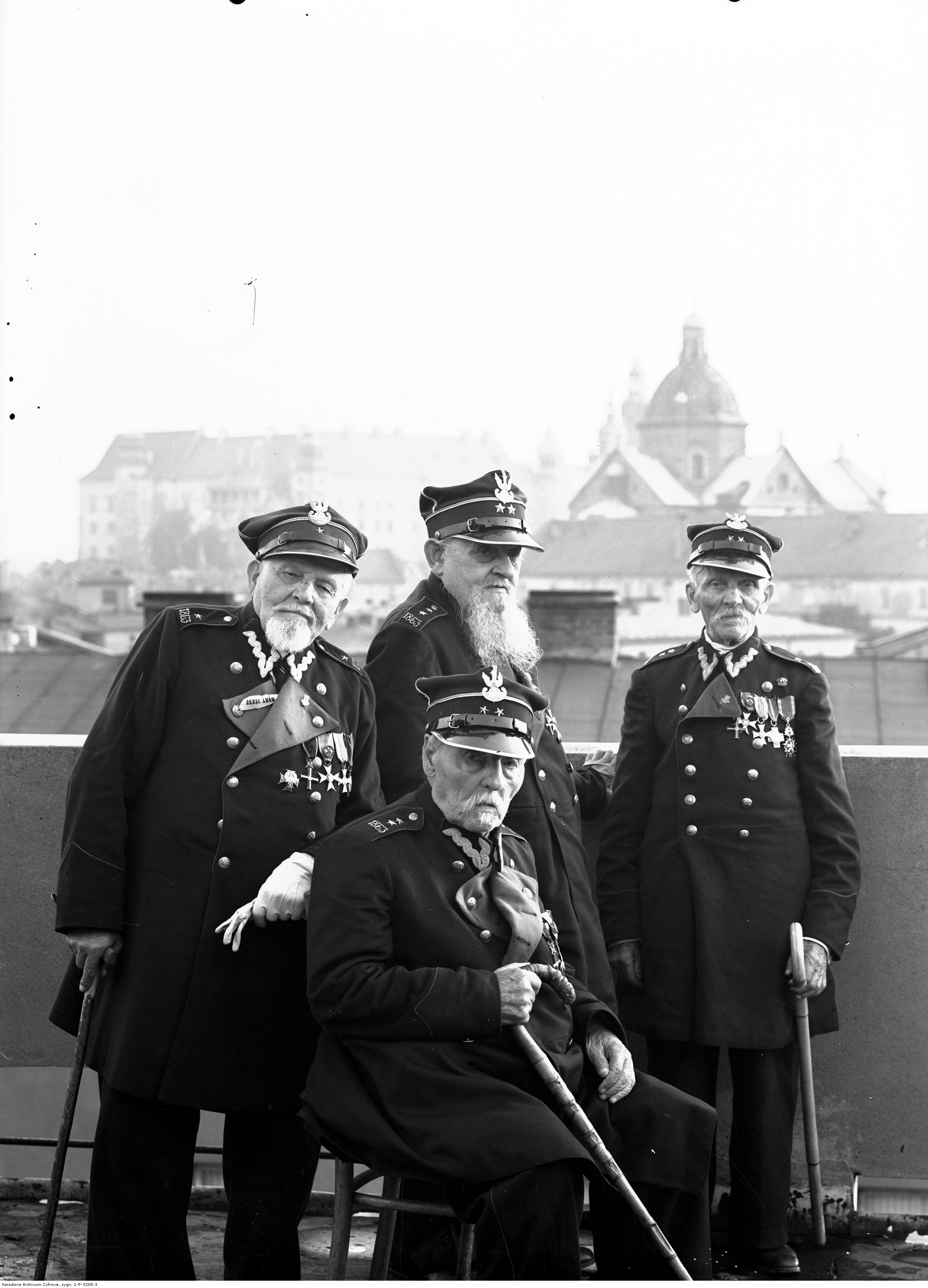
Veterans of the January Uprising. From left: Antoni Süss, Mamert Wandalli, Walenty Milczarski; seated: Wiktor Malewski (1939).

However, clear social antagonisms soon emerged. Young peasants often faced mockery, condescension, or exclusion from their noble peers. While striving for social advancement, they also inherited a traditional distrust of "lords" from their family background. The Russian authorities, posing as benefactors of "the people," eagerly supported any manifestations of anti-Polish and anti-noble sentiment. The noble stratum, for its part, regarded the previously near patriarchal relations between manor and village as natural and enduring. Many failed to perceive the peasants' latent resentment toward the "lords." Even among landowners, there was little awareness that "the people" did not always view the glorified tradition of the January Uprising positively. Villagers often blamed the "lords" for the repressions, that followed the uprising repressions, that affected Catholics, including Lithuanian peasants.

All these factors fostered a growing sense of distinctiveness among the peasants, marking the early stages of the national identity of what is now known as Lithuania.

== Historical Lithuanians ==
As cultural homogenization and linguistic Polonization of the noble estate advanced, the term "Lithuanian" came to denote merely a regional distinctiveness within the unified political nation of the Polish–Lithuanian Commonwealth. The main Polonizing factors—just as elsewhere in the Commonwealth—were the church, the manor, and the town: lower social strata adopted the cultural patterns of the higher ones.

Already in 1576, seven years after the Union of Lublin, Augustyn Rotundus, historiographer of then "Lithuania", wrote that the Lithuanian language used by part of the "Lithuanians" was spoken by peasants, while the nobility widely adopted Polish. This process unfolded without bans or coercion—mainly under the influence of civilizational dominance and administrative practice (there is no evidence of administrative compulsion). In the decade 1620–1630, Polish displaced Ruthenian in the record books (land grants and office nominations) of the Lithuanian Metrica. There is ample evidence of its use by the middle and even petty nobility in the western lands of the Grand Duchy in the first half of the 17th century; the linguistic Polonization progressed fastest in the lands of Lithuania proper, and by the early 18th century Polish was in common use even in the eastern borderlands.

According to Marceli Kosman, in the second half of the 18th century the term "Pole" meant the nobility of the entire Polish–Lithuanian Commonwealth, and "Poland" was used as a concept encompassing the two former states—the Crown of the Kingdom of Poland and the Grand Duchy of Lithuania—joined by a Real union. The designation "Lithuanian", used by the nobility and doubtless stronger than "Lesser Pole" or "Mazovian", nevertheless signaled chiefly a territorial affiliation. Polonizing processes led to the self-description (attested in the 17th century) of Lithuanian landowners as gente Lithuani, natione Poloni ("Lithuanian by birth, Polish by nation").

In social consciousness across the Commonwealth, this meaning of "Pole" and the multi-level nature of identity persisted long after the partitions. Poles from Lithuania readily emphasized that they were of Lithuanian origin and at the same time of Polish nationality.

By the 18th century, Polonization within the borders of the Commonwealth was essentially complete; in Vilna it was a fait accompli.

At the beginning of the 20th century, descendants of the old Lithuanian nobility most often identified as Poles. Only a part of the nobility, explicitly invoking the traditions of historical Lithuania and attempting to reconcile Lithuanian-ness with Polishness, called themselves "Old Lithuanians", "historical Lithuanians", or "Mickiewicz-style Lithuanians" (as in the invocation of Pan Tadeusz: "Lithuania, my homeland …"). Meanwhile, representatives of the former "Samogitian common folk", now "nationalized", called themselves Lithuanians and additionally claimed exclusive ownership of that term.

== See also ==
- Lithuania proper
- Litvin
- Gente Ruthenus, natione Polonus
- Polish–Lithuanian identity

== Bibliography ==
- Kosman, Marceli (1979). Historia Białorusi (in Polish). Wrocław: Zakład Narodowy im. Ossolińskich. ISBN 8304002019.
- Łossowski, Piotr (2005). "Próba przewrotu hitlerowskiego w Kłajpedzie 1933–1935". Studia z dziejów Rosji i Europy Środkowo-Wschodniej (in Polish). 40: 113–129. ISSN 1230-5057.
- Buchowski, Krzysztof (2006). Litwomani i polonizatorzy (in Polish). Białystok: Uniwersytet w Białymstoku. ISBN 978-83-7431-075-8.
- Ładykowski, Paweł (2021). Utracony Wschód: antropologiczne rozważania o polskości (in Polish). Warsaw: Wydawnictwo Naukowe Scholar. doi:10.7366/9788366470866. ISBN 978-83-66470-86-6.
- Błaszczyk, Grzegorz (2022). Litwini na Uniwersytecie Dorpackim (Juriewskim) do 1918 roku i ich dalsze losy (in Polish). Poznań: Wydawnictwo Naukowe UAM. doi:10.14746/amup.9788323240754. ISBN 978-83-232-4075-4. Archived from the original on 2024-07-29.
- Dziewulski, Wacław (1997). Divertimento (in Polish). Tow. Miłośników Wilna i Ziemi Wileńskiej. ISBN 83-907732-4-4.
- Eberhardt, Piotr (1997). Przemiany narodowościowe na Litwie (in Polish). Warsaw.
- Ochmański, Jerzy (1982). Historia Litwy (in Polish). Wrocław–Warsaw.
- Wróbel, Piotr (1990). Kształtowanie się białoruskiej świadomości narodowej a Polska (in Polish). Warsaw.
- Konopczyński, Władysław (1936). Dzieje Polski nowożytnej (in Polish). Vol. I. Warsaw.
- Rachuba, Andrzej (2010). Państwo litewskie w epoce nowożytnej 1569–1795 (in Polish). Warsaw.
