= Sabella =

Sabella may refer to:

- Sabella (surname), a name of Italian origin
- Steve Sabella, Palestinian artist
- Ernie Sabella, American actor
- Salvatore Sabella, Italian-born crime boss of the Philadelphia crime family in the 1920s
- Alejandro Sabella, Argentine football player and manager
- Sabella (annelid), a genus of marine polychaete worms
- Sabella (company), a former French tidal stream turbine developer
- Oh! Sabella, a 1957 Italian comedy film
