= Zabiela =

- Lithuanian surname
- m.: Zabiela
- f.: (unmarried): Zabielaitė
- f.: (married): Zabielienė
- Related names: Polish: Zabiello, Russian:Zabela, Ukrainian:Zabila (uk:Забіла)

Zabiela (Ukrainianized version Zabila) is a surname of Lithuanian origin. Notable people with the surname include:

- James Zabiela (born 1979), English DJ and producer
- Vytautas Zabiela (1930–2019), Lithuanian lawyer and politician
- Natalia Zabila, Ukrainian writer
- Ona Zabielaitė-Karvelienė (1899–1955) Lithuanian singer and music teacher
