= Karvelis =

- Lithuanian surname
- m.: Karvelis
- f.: (unmarried): Karvelytė
- f.: (married): Karvelienė
- Origin: literally "pigeon", "dove"

Karvelis is a Lithuanian language family name. It may refer to:

- Ugnė Karvelis (1935–2002), Lithuanian writer and translator
- Juozas Karvelis (1934–2018), Lithuanian politician
- Ona Zabielaitė-Karvelienė (1899–1955), Lithuanian singer
- Petras Karvelis (1897–1976), Lithuanian politician and statesman
- Vytautas Karvelis
