= Old Woman Telling the Tale of Psyche =

Enamel Painted plaque by Martin Didier Pape

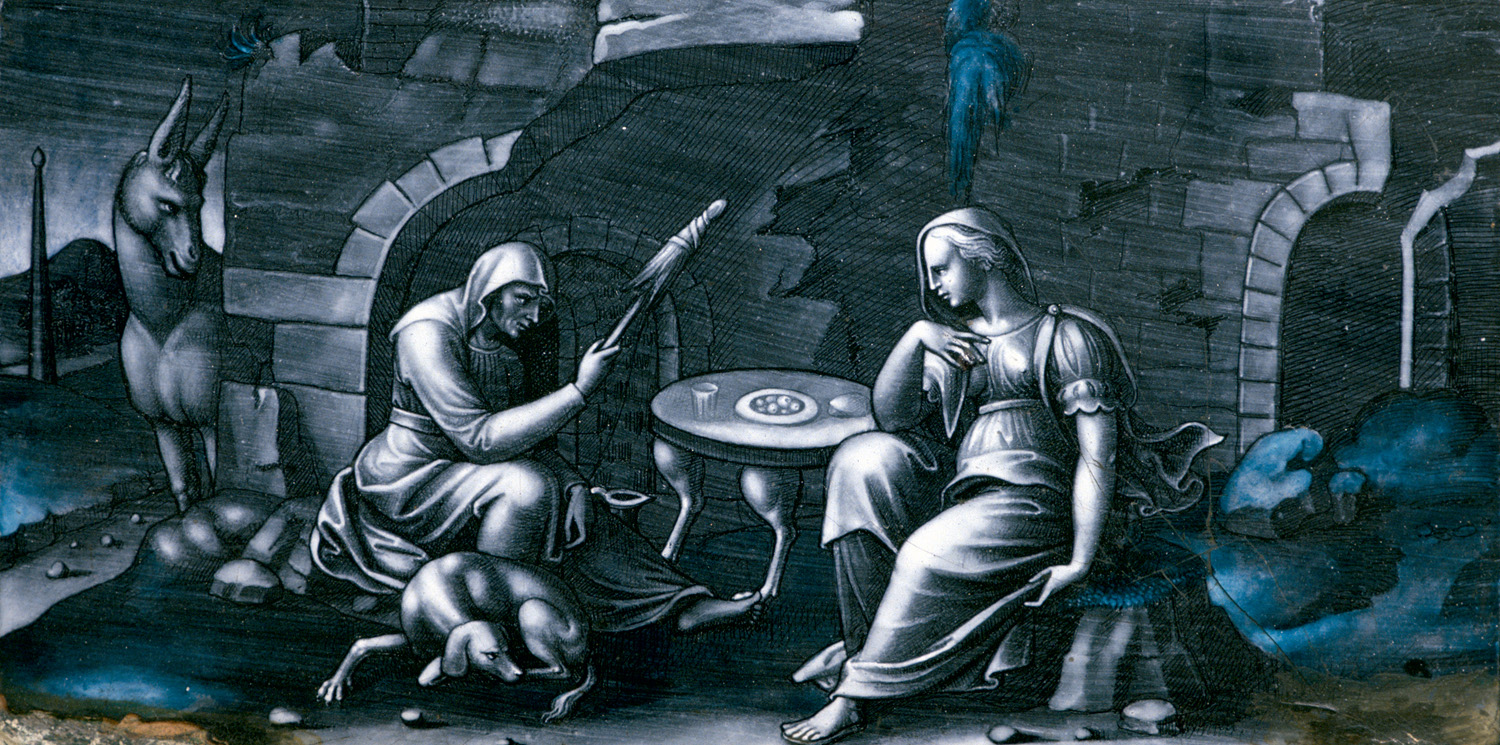

Old Woman Telling the Tale of Psyche is a plaque in grisaille painted Limoges enamel by Martin Didier Pape, showing an old woman telling a young woman the story of Cupid and Psyche. It was made in the Limousin region around 1580, copying an engraving of the scene by the 'Master of the Die'. The work's French inscription states it is "after a composition by Raphael" and also includes the artist's name. It has been in the Museum of Fine Arts of Lyon since 1851, whilst many of Pape's other works are in the Walters Art Museum in Baltimore, USA.
