= Barvinok (magazine) =

Ukrainian children's magazine

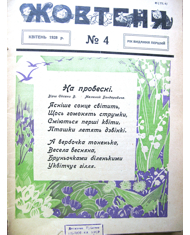
4th edition, as the Zhovtenya magazine, 1928

Barvinok was a monthly literary, artistic, and general educational magazine for children of primary and secondary school age, which was published up to and including 2019. It is one of the oldest periodicals in Ukraine, with a cumulative circulation of more than 86 years exceeding 315 million copies.

== History ==
The magazine was founded in January 1928 in Kharkiv under the name Zhovtenya. In 1935, Zhovtenya was merged with the edition for the youngest Tuk-tuk. The literary component of the magazine was noticeably enriched with quality literary pieces. The works of Natalia Zabila, Oksana Ivanenko, Oleksandr Kopylenko, Mykola Trublaini, Oles Donchenko, Volodymyr Vladko, and Maria Prygar developed the Ukrainian children's literature of that time.

After the end of World War II, the magazine's publishing resumed in April–May 1945 in Kyiv under a new name - Barvinok. The renaming initiative belongs to the famous Ukrainian children's writer Natalia Zabila, with the support of the Ukrainian poet Pavlo Tychyna, then the Minister of Education of the Ukrainian SSR.

The first issue of Barvinok opened with a poem by Natalia Zabila, which became a kind of poetic manifesto of the publication.

From 1950 to 1998, the magazine was dubbed with a Russian-language edition.

In the second half of the 20th century, well-known writers headed and were included in the editorial board of Barvinok. Although the magazine belonged to the Komsomol, it was strongly influenced by the writers' organization. By the end of the 20th century, representatives of all literary generations participated.

Until 1991, Barvinok was published as "the magazine of the Central Committee of the Leninist Communist Union of Youth of Ukraine (LKSMU) and the Republican Council of the Pioneer Organization " as part of the "Youth" book and magazine publishing house. Since 1991, the editorial staff was the founder and publisher of the magazine.

Barvinok was the only periodical representing Ukraine throughout the entire territory of the former USSR and beyond for a long time with mass circulation. Built mainly on Ukrainian material, it had the unique mission of maintaining and preserving national identity outside Ukraine. From the 1950s to the beginning of the 1990s 600–800 thousand of its 1.2–1.8 million monthly circulations were distributed in all Soviet Union republics without exception.

Primarily Barvinok was distributed in areas with a dense population of Ukrainians. In several regions, for example, in Russia, the subscription editions exceeded 10 thousand. During this period, approx. 30 to 50 thousand copies of the Ukrainian edition of the magazine were sent outside Ukraine. Around 150-180 thousand were received monthly by the families of servicemen in the places where the Soviet troops were stationed at the time, German Democratic Republic, Czechoslovakia, Poland, and Mongolia. The magazine was sent to 28 countries of the world in total.

Until 1990, Barvinok was the only Ukrainian periodical for younger schoolchildren. As a Soviet youth magazine, it was supposed to represent the views of the totalitarian regime on education. However, as the researchers point out, Barvinok managed to avoid excessive politicization and skillfully appeal to the child's emotional world despite the strict ideological censorship. The magazine captured universal values and was laid in the spiritual foundations of generations of readers. All this was the determining factor that provided Barvinok with a large and stable reading audience.

Barvinok became a platform where many children's writers started their literary careers. In particular, the following children's writers were closely related to the magazine: Vsevolod Nestaiko, Bohdan Chalyi, Dmytro Bilous, Anatolii Kostetsky, and Halyna Malyk. Most of the laureates of the government Lesya Ukrainka Award for the best literary works for children, as well as a large part of the laureates of the Shevchenko National Prize, were the authors of Barvinok.

In 1979, Bohdan Chalyi and Vsevolody Nestaiko became the only Ukrainian writers honored with the prestigious international Hans Christian Andersen Award.

=== After 1991 ===
In the first half of the 1990s after the collapse of the USSR Barvinok lost markets outside Ukraine, and its almost monopoly position in the domestic market was rapidly filled with new editions. Although significantly reduced, the magazine's circulation still allowed for uninterrupted publishing even in hyperinflation conditions.

At that time, Barvinok was already wholly independent, there was a change in the editorial board and the author composition. People with experience in children's literature and journalism came to work in the magazine. Despite the difficulties of the transition period, the magazine relatively quickly adapted to the new operating conditions. Its volume increased for the first time, and the Russian-language edition was canceled.

Since 2013, the magazine was distributed only by subscription. Its geography included all administrative regions of Ukraine. Traditionally, Barvinok has the most readers in the Kyiv, Vinnytsia, Poltava, Dnipropetrovsk, Cherkasy, and Mykolaiv regions. Some copies are given to Sunday schools in the United States (Detroit, Chicago, New Jersey), Canada, Australia, and new diaspora communities in Italy, Spain, Estonia, Georgia, and Turkey. The audience of Barvinok is equally distributed among the children from urban and rural areas, with a slight predominance of girls.

In December 2014, the 1,000th issue of Barvinok was published. The magazine has gained the reputation of a "classic" publication that addresses children's requests for the most critical cognitive-educational and cultural information.

In 2019, the editors announced that the publication was ceasing its work due to the low interest of children in printed publications.

== Editors ==
The prominent editors of the magazine were famous writers:

- Natalia Zabila (1945–1947)
- Oksana Ivanenko (1947–1951)
- Bohdan Chalyi (1951–1975)
- Anatolii Davydov (1975–1984)
- Vasyl Moruga (1984–1989)
- Vasyl Voronovych (since 1989)

== Awards and honors ==
The magazine was awarded the Certificate of Honor of the Presidium of the Verkhovna Rada of the Ukrainian SSR (1978) and the Certificate of Honor of the Cabinet of Ministers of Ukraine (2003), received greetings from the Presidents of Ukraine Leonid Kuchma and Viktor Yushchenko on the occasion of their anniversaries. Also, the magazine received many awards for winning all-Ukrainian competitions.
