= Gente Ruthenus, natione Polonus =

Self-identification of Polonized Ruthenians

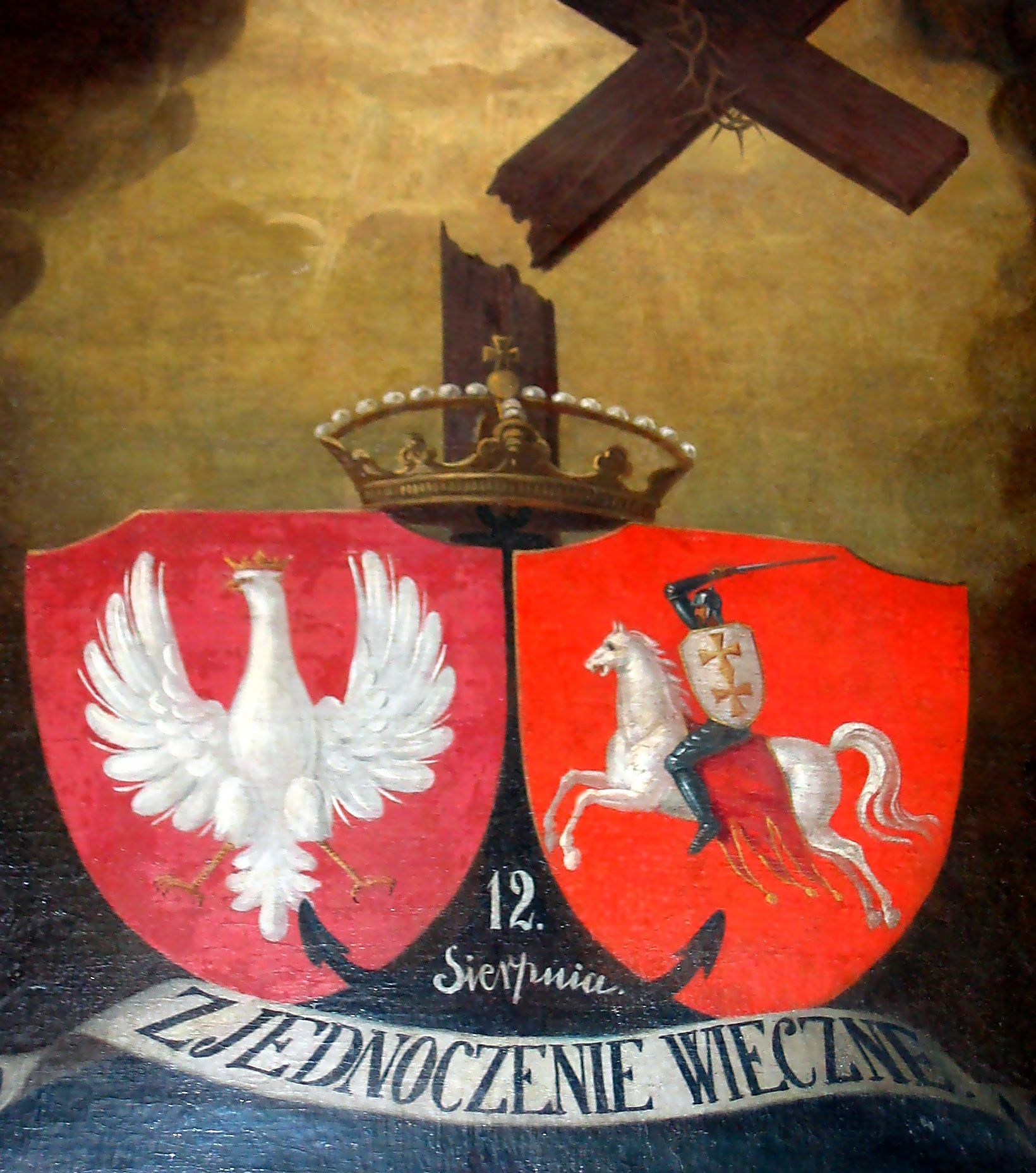
Painting commemorating Polish–Lithuanian union; c. 1861. The motto reads "eternal union", in Polish only.

Gente Ruthenus, natione Polonus (Note: Depending on the source, also Gente Ruthenum, nation Polonum or Gente Rutheni, natione Poloni.) (Ruthenian origin, of Polish nationality (Note: z rodu Rusin, z narodu Polak)) — a term describing the political and national self-identification of Polonized Ruthenians (modern Belarusians, Rusyns, Ukrainians).

== History ==
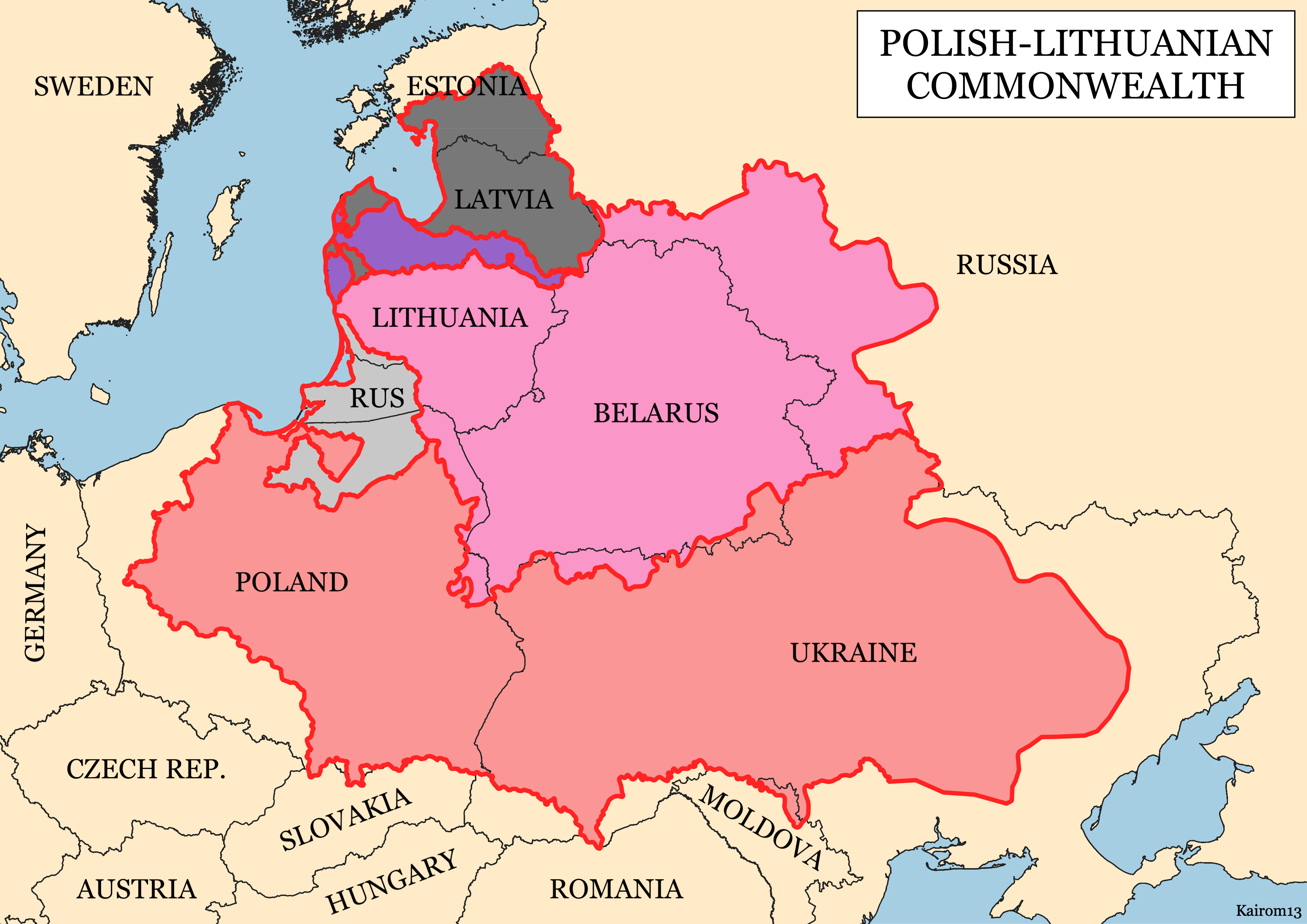
Outline of the Polish–Lithuanian Commonwealth with its major subdivisions after the 1618 Truce of Deulino, superimposed on present-day national borders. Crown of the Kingdom of Poland Grand Duchy of Lithuania Duchy of Livonia Duchy of Prussia, Polish fief Duchy of Courland and Semigallia, Commonwealth fief

The authorship of this phrase has historically been attributed to the Ruthenian-Polish Renaissance thinker Stanisław Orzechowski, who, in the absence of a Ruthenian state, outlined a new political identity for the Ruthenian nobility. This identity emphasized a strong awareness of their Ruthenian origins while simultaneously acknowledging their belonging to the "Polish political nation". (Note: During the Polish-Lithuanian Commonwealth, the term "Polish" referred not to ethnicity but to political affiliation with the "Polish political nation" — the nobility.) Later research, however, has shown that Orzechowski did not use the exact phrase gente ruthenus, natione polonus. The closest formulation he used was gente Roxolani, (Note: According to the Sarmatian legend, the Ruthenian nobility descended from the Roxolani tribe, which is why Renaissance authors used this name as a synonym for the Ruthenian ethnonym.) natione vero Poloni or, as he described himself, homo ex Ruthenis ortus, Romano tamen ritu. (Note: a person of Ruthenian origin, of Roman rite) The latter was meant to emphasize that Ruthenians could belong to different religious rites. Today, such interpretations of Orzechowski's views are questioned due to his pro-Polish stance.

This self-identification became widespread in Galicia in the 19th century among Ruthenians who consciously chose Polishness as their new identity, allowing them to advance socially (e.g., I. Vahylevych, O. Krynytsky, Yu. Lavrivsky). It was also adopted by members of the old Polonized Ruthenian aristocracy who "recalled" and appealed to their Ruthenian origins (e.g., W. Dzieduszycki, J. Kossak, L. Sapieha). Emphasizing their "Ruthenianness" gave them the legitimacy to represent the Ruthenian people while promoting the idea of a "common homeland" and "brotherhood" of nations, aiming to align Ruthenian issues with Polish interests. During the Spring of Nations, they formed their political committee — the Ruthenian sobor and its publication — the Dnevnik Ruskij, which, however, was less popular than the St. George's faction and the Supreme Ruthenian Council. Despite this, they managed to secure prominent positions at the Prague Slavic Congress, 1848.

== Modern usage ==
Today, this term and its derivatives are used retrospectively to describe members of Polonized Ukrainian, Belarusian, and Lithuanian noble families from various historical periods.

Derivatives such as gente ruthenus, natione lithuanus and gente polonus, natione lithuanus have also been used to describe Ruthenians and Poles who lived in the Grand Duchy of Lithuania and, despite their origins, primarily identified as its citizens — Litvins.

== See also ==
- Polish–Lithuanian identity
- Great Lithuanians
- Litvin
