= Master of the Die =

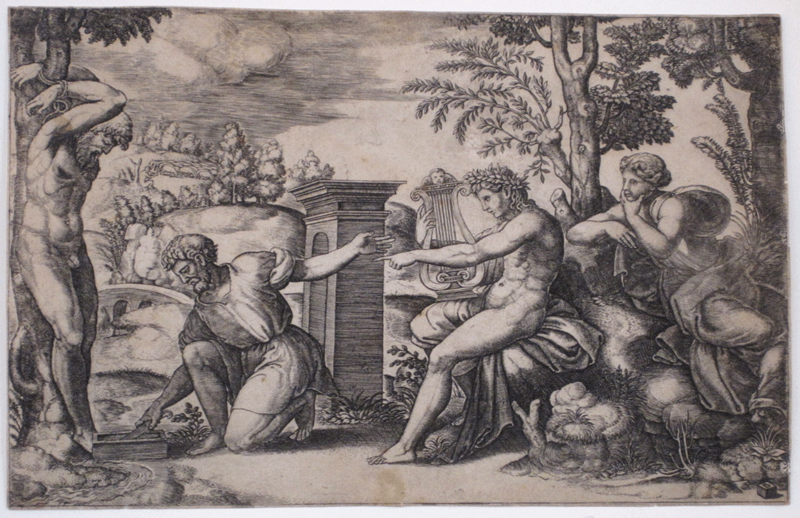
Apollo and Marsyas by the Master of the Die

Master of the Die (fl. 1525–1560) was an Italian engraver and printmaker. His year of birth and death are unknown.

The identity of the Master of the Die is uncertain. He was given this name because he signed his prints with a small die (dice). Some theories to the identity of the artist include Benedetto Verino, Marcantonio Raimondi's son Daddi or Dado, Giovanni Francesco Zabello, or Tommaso Vincidor. The artist known as the Master of the Die studied under Marcantonio Raimondi. He worked in the style of Raphael.
