= Sabela (disambiguation) =

Sabela is a linguistic register or language originally developed in South African prisons.

Sabela may also refer to:

- Sabaila, Nepal, a municipality sometimes spelled "Sabela"
- Waorani language, a South-American language commonly known as "Sabela"
