= Sabelo =

Sabelo is a South African given name that may refer to:

- Sabelo Mlangeni (born 1980), South African photographer
- Sabelo J. Ndlovu-Gatsheni, Professor and Chair of Epistemologies of the Global South
- Sabelo Ndzinisa (born 1991), Swazi football player
- Sabelo Nhlapo (born 1988), South African rugby union player
- Sabelo Stanley Ntwasa, a priest in the South African Anglican Church
- Sabelo Nyembe, (born 1991) South African football player
- Sabelo Phama, (1949–1994) South African revolutionary
- Sabelo Radebe (born 2000), South African soccer player
