= Modzelewski =

Modzelewski (feminine: Modzelewska; plural: Modzelewscy) is a Polish surname. It may refer to:

- Dick Modzelewski (1931–2018), American football player and coach
- Ed Modzelewski (1929–2015), American football player
- Karol Modzelewski (1937–2019), Polish historian, writer and politician
- Moira Modzelewski, American lawyer and US Navy captain
- Stanisław Modzelewski (1929–1969), Polish serial killer
- Zygmunt Modzelewski (1900–1954), Polish Communist politician
- Francine Clark née Modzelewska, French actress and art collector
- Stanley Stutz né Modzelewski (1920–1975), American basketball player
