= Litvin =

Slavic word for residents of Lithuania

Litvin (Note: Belarusian: ліцьвін, літвін, romanized: lićvin, litvin; Lithuanian: litvinas; Polish: Litwin; Russian: литвин, romanized: litvin; Ukrainian: литвин, romanized: lytvyn) is a Slavic word for Lithuanians as well as all residents of the Grand Duchy of Lithuania in the 13th–18th centuries in general, which began to be used no later than the 16th century mostly by the East Slavs. Currently, Litvin or its cognates are still used in some European languages for Lithuanians. (Note: Hungarian: litván; Macedonian: Литвански, romanized: Litvanski; Polish: Litwin; Serbian: Литвански, romanized: Litvanski)

== Meanings ==
=== Grand Duchy of Lithuania ===
In the 16–18th centuries, the term "Litvin" was mostly used by East Slavs to refer to all inhabitants of the Grand Duchy of Lithuania.

Several authentic sources, surviving from the Middle Ages, with expressed opinion of the Grand Dukes of Lithuania themselves prove that the Lithuanians (founders, rulers of Lithuania from the Gediminids dynasty) were those who spoke Old Lithuanian and originated from the cultural regions of Aukštaitija and Žemaitija, while their Eastern neighbours were Rus' people (Ruthenians):

"We do not know on whose merits or guilt such a decision was made, or with what we have offended Your Lordship so much that Your Lordship has deservedly been directed against us, creating hardship for us everywhere. First of all, you made and announced a decision about the land of Samogitia, which is our inheritance and our homeland from the legal succession of the ancestors and elders. We still own it, it is and has always been the same Lithuanian land, because there is one language and the same inhabitants. Since the land of Samogitia is located lower than the land of Lithuania, it is called as Samogitia, because in Lithuanian it is called lower land [ Žemaitija ]. And the Samogitians call Lithuania as Aukštaitija, that is, from the Samogitian point of view, a higher land. Also, the people of Samogitia have long called themselves as Lithuanians and never as Samogitians, and because of such identity (sic) we do not write about Samogitia in our letter, because everything is one: one country and the same inhabitants."

— Vytautas the Great, excerpt from his 11 March 1420 Latin letter sent to Sigismund, Holy Roman Emperor, in which he described the core of the Grand Duchy of Lithuania, composed from Žemaitija (lowlands) and Aukštaitija (highlands). Term Aukštaitija is known since the 13th century.

"This is the peace made by the Livonian Master and the King of Lithuania and expressed in the following words:
(...) Next, a German merchant can travel safely concerning his life and property through Rus' [ Ruthenia ] and Lithuania as far as the King of Lithuania's authority seeks.
(...) Next, if something is stolen from a German merchant in Lithuania or Rus', it must be put on trial where it happens; if it happens that a German steals from a Rus [ Ruthenian ] or a Lithuanian, the same way it must be put on trial where it happens.
(...) Moreover, if a Lithuanian or a Rus [ Ruthenian ] wants to sue a German for an old thing, he must apply to the person to whom the person is subordinate; the same must be done by a German in Lithuania or Rus'.
(...) That peace was made in the one thousand three hundred and thirty-eighth year of the birth of God, on All Saints' Day, with the consent of the Master, the Marshal of the Land and many other nobles, as well as the City Council of Riga; they kissed the cross on the matter; With the consent of the King of Lithuania [ Gediminas ], his sons and all his nobles; they also performed their sacred rites in this matter [ Pagan rites ]; and with the consent of the Bishop of Polotsk [ Gregory ], the Duke of Polotsk [ Narimantas ] and the city, the Duke of Vitebsk [ Algirdas ] and the city of Vitebsk; they all, in approval of the said peace treaty, kissed the cross."

— From the 1338 Peace and Trade Agreement, concluded in Vilnius, between the Grand Duke of Lithuania Gediminas and his sons and the Master of the Livonian Order Everhard von Monheim, establishing a peace zone, which clearly distinguishes the Lithuanians and the Rus' people [ Ruthenians ], and Lithuania from Rus' [ Ruthenia ].

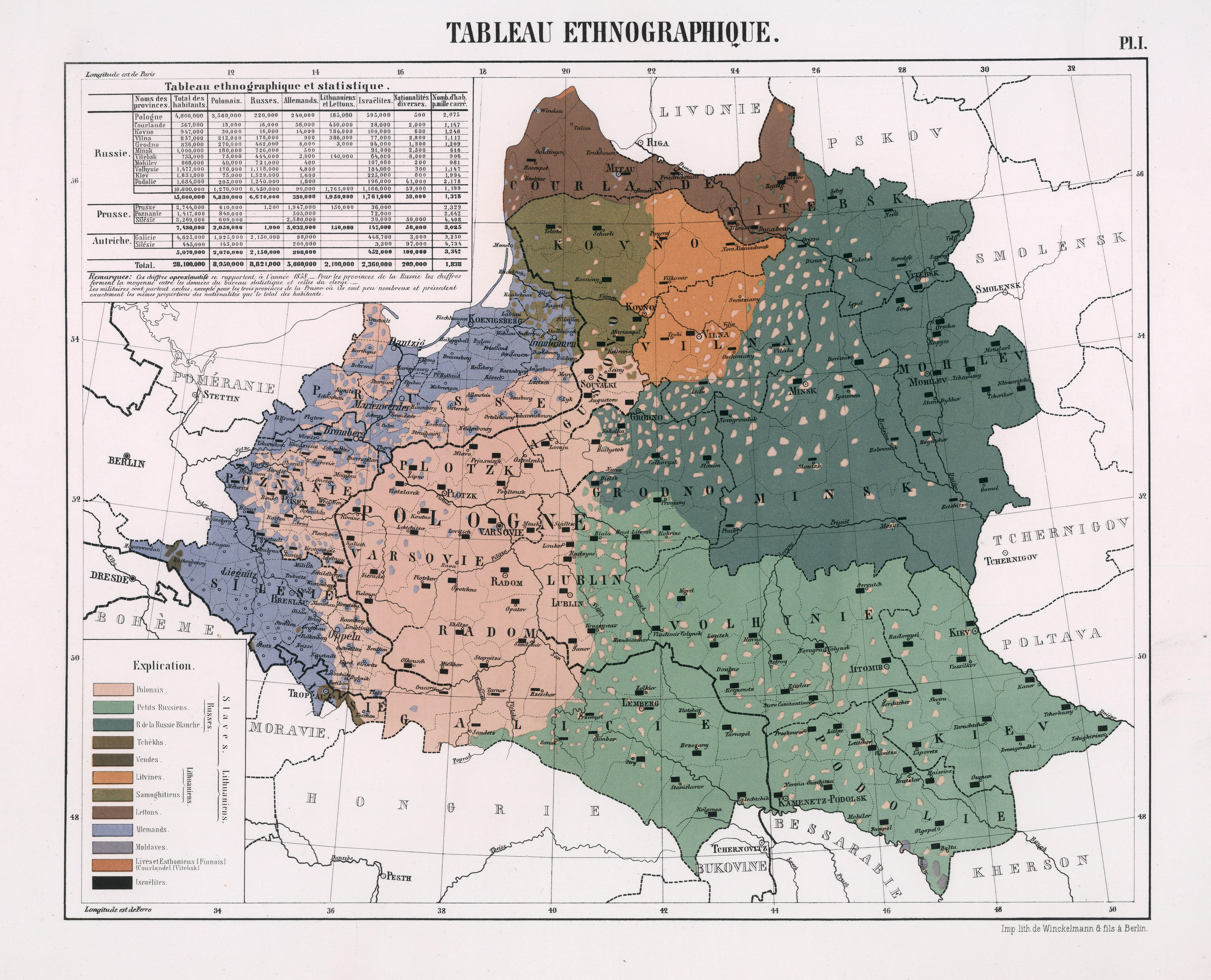
1863 ethnographic map of the former Polish–Lithuanian Commonwealth by Georg Ferdinand Robert d’Erckert. Aukštaitian Lithuanians (marked orange) are listed as Litvins.

=== Ethnic group in Ukraine ===
Litvins are a small ethnic group in the area of the mid-stream Desna River (northern Ukraine). The ethnographic or cultural studies about Litvins are poorly noted and are traced to the beginning of the 18th century. The poet-monk Klymentiy Zinoviyiv who published several cultural studies noted that Litvins, perhaps after an older pagan tradition, worked on Sundays and rested on Fridays. More notes about Litvins were provided at the end of the 18th century by historians of the Russian Empire Afanasiy (Opanas) Shafonsky and Yakov Markovych. According to Markovych, Litvins are a regional group such as Gascons in France or Swabians in Germany.

The name Litvin (Litvyak) owes its origin to political factors and is a demonym (politonym) referencing the Grand Duchy of Lithuania. Litvins in the Chernihiv region (Chernihiv Oblast) call themselves Ruski, but not Moskals or Katsaps. They consider the term Litvin to be derogatory. According to the 2001 census, there were 22 Litvins in Ukraine.

=== Modern usage in Belarus ===
Since the dissolution of the Soviet Union in 1991, the term "Litvin" has been adopted by some Belarusian nationalists to claim the Grand Duchy of Lithuania as Belarusian. This is an alternative to the demonym "Belarusians" which is derived from White Rus' and, therefore, implies that it is somehow less than the Great Russia. Some Belarusians like Mikola Yermalovich and Viktor Veras (Виктор Верас) claim that the Grand Duchy was Belarusian and that modern Lithuanians are "historical Samogitians" (the term Samogitia translates as Lowlands of Lithuania proper) who, despite being "not Lithuanians", somehow managed to usurp the name "Lithuania" for themselves. In other words, these writers in contrast to Lithuanian linguists claim that modern Belarusians are "the true Lithuanians" referred to in historical texts and not "modern Lithuanians". This theory is considered fringe and is not accepted by historians. During the 2009 census, 66 people identified themselves as Litvins in Belarus.

=== Modern usage in Poland ===
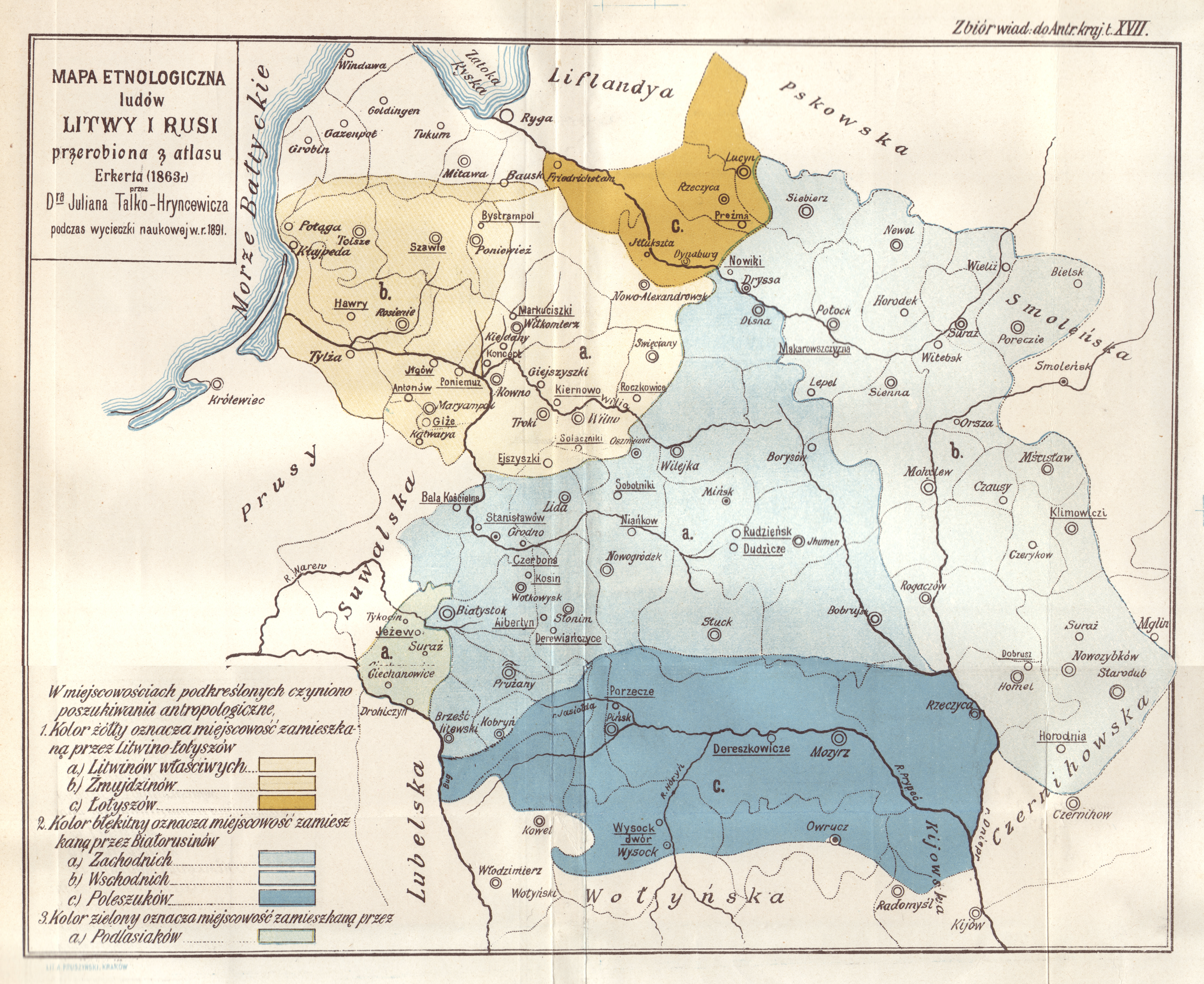
Ethnographic Map of the Peoples of Lithuania and Rus by Polish ethnographer Julian Talko-Hryncewicz in 1893. Aukštaitian Lithuanians are listed as Proper Lithuanians (Litwinów właściwych)

The Poles still use the words Litwini and Litwa when referring to the Lithuanians and Lithuania respectively. While the Belarusians and Belarus are named as Białorusini and Białoruś respectively in Polish.

=== Modern usage in Ukraine ===
The Ukrainians nowadays refer to Lithuania as «Литва» (Lytva) in Ukrainian, which is its historic name from the Middle Ages, and to the Lithuanians as «литовці» (lytovtsi). The Grand Duchy of Lithuania is called Велике князівство Литовське (Velyke kniazivstvo Lytovske).

== See also ==
- Prussian Lithuanians
- Samogitians
- Polish-Lithuanian identity
- Litvaks or Lithuanian Jews
- Tutejszy
- Name of Lithuania
- Gente Ruthenus, natione Polonus
