= Sabella (surname) =

Sabella is a surname of Sicilian origin, the origin is in Agrigento (Acragante) prominent city of Magna Grecia. and may refer to:

- Alejandro Sabella (1954–2020), Argentine footballer and manager
- Alexis Sabella (born 2001), Argentine footballer
- Ernie Sabella (born 1949), American actor
- Michael Sabella (1911–1989), American caporegime of the Bonanno crime family
- Salvatore Sabella (1891–1962), American mob boss in Philadelphia
- Steve Sabella (born 1975), Palestinian artist
- Valentín Sabella (born 1999), Argentine footballer
