= Giovanni Francesco Zabello =

16th-century Italian painter and engraver

Giovanni Francesco Zabello (fl. c. 1546) was an Italian painter and engraver. He was born in Bergamo and eventually moved to Russia to help create many works of art. There he also founded the Russian branch of the Zabello family.
