= Natalia Zabila =

Ukrainian poet and children's writer (1903–1985)

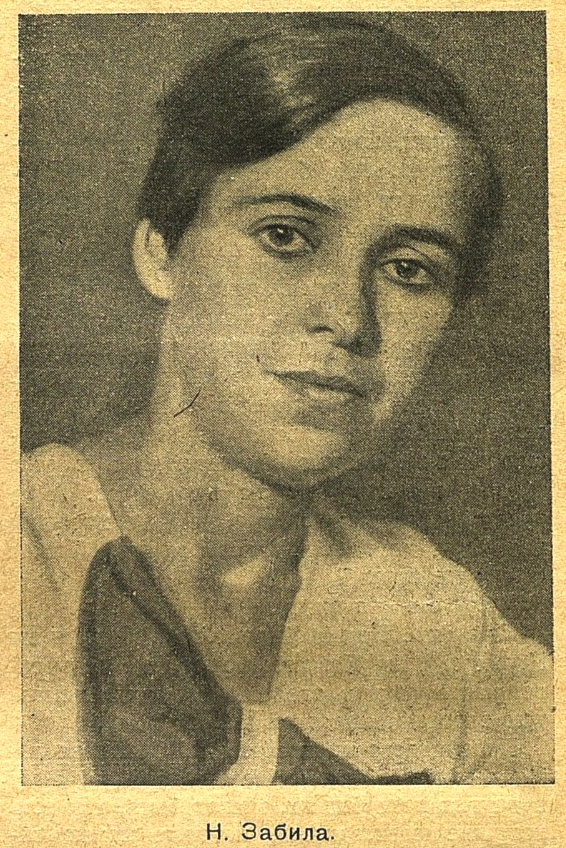
- Born: February 20, 1903; St. Petersburg, Russian Empire
- Died: February 6, 1985 (aged 81); Kyiv, Ukrainian SSR
- Occupations: Poet, children's writer

Natalia Lvivna Zabila (5 March [O.S. 20 February] 1903 – 6 February 1985) was a Ukrainian poet, novelist, and playwright.

== Early life and education ==
Natalia Zabila was born in 1903 in St. Petersburg into a noble family descending from the Cossack starshyna of Left-bank Ukraine. Her father was the son of the academician-sculptor Parmen Zabila and a relative of the Ukrainian poet and friend of Taras Shevchenko, Viktor Zabila. Her father's maternal aunt was the wife of the artist Nikolai Ge. Zabila's parents studied at the Stieglitz Art School.

There were seven children in the family: four girls and three boys. All of them were brought up in an atmosphere of admiration for fiction, music, and painting. Zabila was taught to draw, compose poems, and create fairy tales from childhood. She read a lot, in particular the works of Taras Shevchenko, and practiced writing poems as a child.

In 1917, Zabila's family moved to Ukraine and settled in the small village of Liubotyn (now Kharkiv region). Her father remained in St. Petersburg, so the older children had to work.

Zabila finished the accelerated course in the gymnasium, worked in various positions, and taught for several years in the village of Stary Lyubotyn (now part of Lyubotyn) near Kharkiv. In 1925, she graduated from the historical department of the Kharkiv Institute of Public Education. In her student years, Zabila wrote prose and poetry for children. In 1924, her husband Sava Bozhko printed her first poem in the newspaper Chervony Kordon in Kamianets-Podilskyi. Zabila's early works were influenced by Modernism, which she later had to abandon under the pressure of Soviet authorities.

== Career ==
After graduating from the institute, Zabila worked in the editorial office of the magazine New Book in the Ukrainian Book Chamber.

In 1926, the first book of Zabila's poems, The Far Land, was published. In 1927, the first book for children with short stories Za Volya and The Tale of the Red Beast followed. Having published the poetic story for children About a Little Monkey in 1928, Zabila firmly set out to create children's literature. Although she publishes books for adult readers, works for children become her vocation.

In 1930, Zabila switched to creative work, already having a dozen books, albeit mostly small ones. More than half of those poetry and prose collections are addressed to young readers: Adventures on a Bus (1928), "At Sea" (1929), About Tarasyk and Marysya (1930), Yasochchyna's Book (1934).

During the war, Zabila lived and worked in Kazakhstan. Returning to Ukraine, she headed the Kharkiv Writers' Organization and edited Barvinok magazine until 1947. During her literary career, Zabila has published about two hundred books for children, primarily for preschool and junior school. The collections "Under the Bright Sun" (1949), "Happy Children" (1959), "To the Wide World" (1960), "Stories, Fairy Tales, and Tales" (1962), "Stood a Hut" (1974), "Native Kyiv" (1977, 1982), as well as "Selected Works" in four volumes (1984) were very popular among young readers.

== Personal life ==
Natalia Zabila was married three times. She met her first husband Sava Bozhko in 1923 and in 1924 their son Taras was born. In 1925 Natalia married her second husband, children's poet Anton Shmyhelsky. They had two daughters Halyna and Yasia who died during the times of Holodomor.

After the death of the daughters Zabila married artist Dmytro Shavykin.

== Contribution ==
Zabila's creative work is characterized by a variety of themes and genres. The writer told children about historical events such as the life of distant ancestors in the fantasy play The First Step (1968) and in the dramatic poem "Trojan's Children", which is a poetic retelling of The Tale of Igor's Campaign, dedicating it to the 1500th anniversary of founding Kyiv. In 1972, these works were awarded the Lesya Ukrainka Literary Prize (she became the first laureate of this prize).

Zabila is widely known as a translator and popularizer of children's literature of other peoples in Ukraine. She translated from French, Polish, and other languages. The writer's works have been translated into many languages. In addition, Zabila was the author of the textbooks Reader for the second grade (1933) and Reader for the third grade (1939), which were reprinted several times.

For many years, Zabila was the head of the children's literature commission in the Union of Writers of Ukraine, a member of the editorial board of children's magazines, the editorial board of Dytvydav, and spoke at writers' conventions and meetings on children's literature as a literary critic. Zabila's creative heritage also includes philosophical and intimate, sometimes erotic lyrics. Soviet literary studies didn't highlight this aspect of her creativity, passing off the writer as purely children's author. Her work for adults is the poetry collection "Three-Quarters of an Age" (Kyiv, Dnipro, 1978).

== Death and commemoration ==
Zabila died on 6 February 1985 in Kyiv at the age of 82. In 1988, the editors of the well-known popular children's magazine Malyatko established the Natalia Zabila Literary Award for the best literary work and illustration. In 2013, Verkhovna Rada of Ukraine registered a draft law commemorating the 110th anniversary of Zabila's birth by establishing a state prize for works for children. One of the streets in the city of Lubotyn, Kharkiv region, is named after her. In 2021, a street in Kyiv that was previously named by the Georgian Bolshevik Oleksandr Tsulukidze was renamed in her honor.
