= Ona Zabielaitė-Karvelienė =

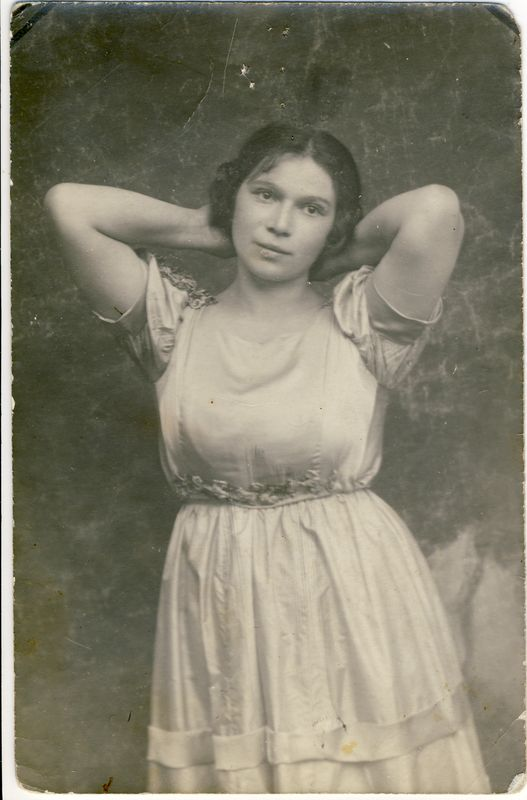

Ona Zabielaitė-Karvelienė (1899–1955) was a Lithuanian singer (contralto, mezzo-soprano) and music teacher.
