= Polish–Lithuanian identity =

Shared identity in Eastern Europe

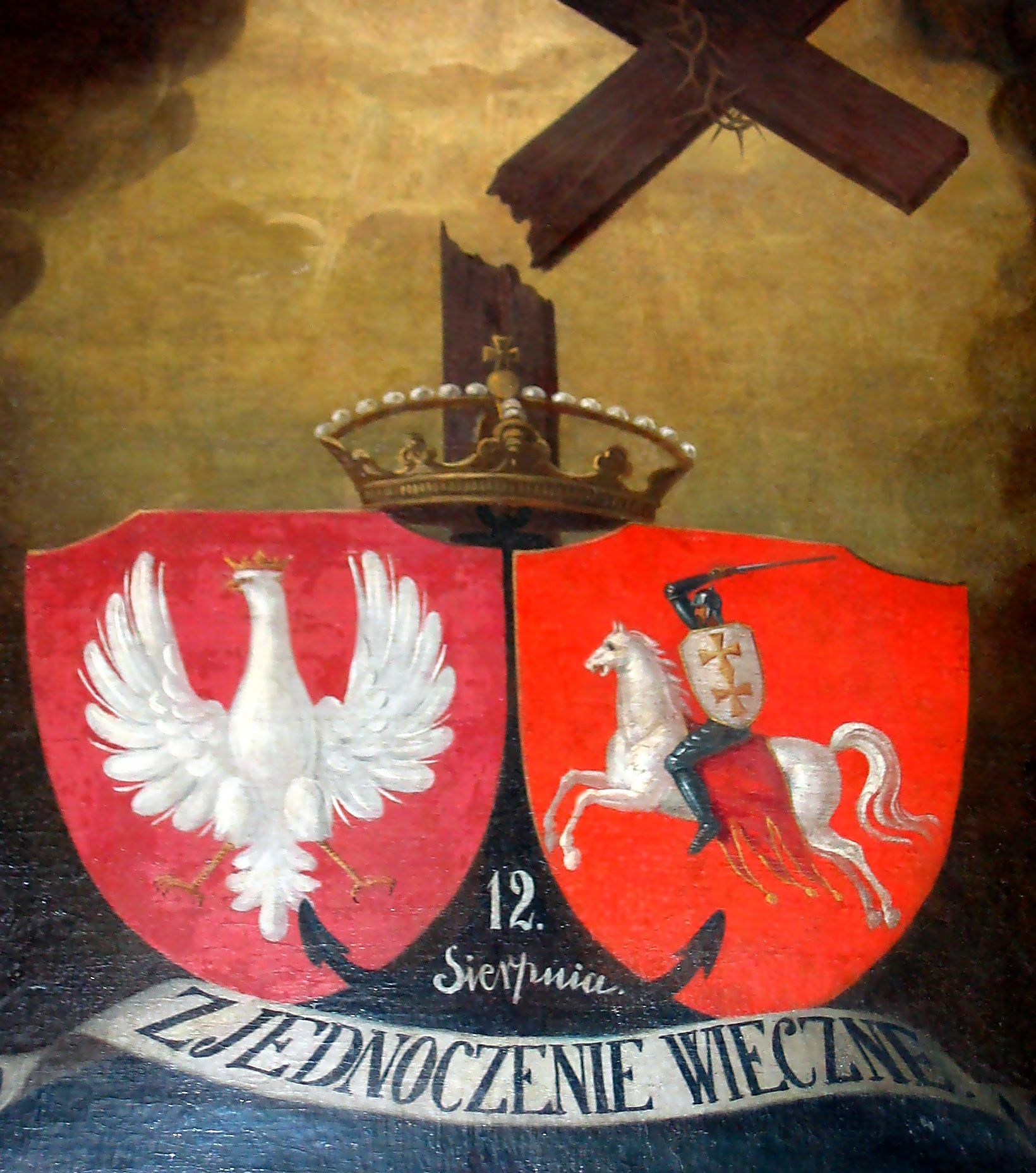
Painting commemorating Polish–Lithuanian union; c. 1861. The motto reads "eternal union", in Polish only.

The Polish–Lithuanian identity describes individuals and groups with histories in the Polish–Lithuanian Commonwealth or with close connections to its culture. This federation, formally established by the 1569 Union of Lublin between the Kingdom of Poland and Grand Duchy of Lithuania, created a multi-ethnic and multi-confessional state founded on the binding powers of national identity and shared culture rather than ethnicity or religious affiliation. The term "Polish–Lithuanian" has been used to describe various groups residing in the Commonwealth, including those that did not share the Polish or Lithuanian ethnicity nor their predominant Roman Catholic faith.

The usage of "Polish–Lithuanian" in this context can potentially be confusing, particularly as the term is often abbreviated to just "Polish", or misinterpreted as being a simple mix of the 20th-century nationalistic usage of the terms "Polish" and "Lithuanian", as, depending on the context, it may include numerous ethnic groups that inhabited the Commonwealth.

== 16th–18th centuries ==
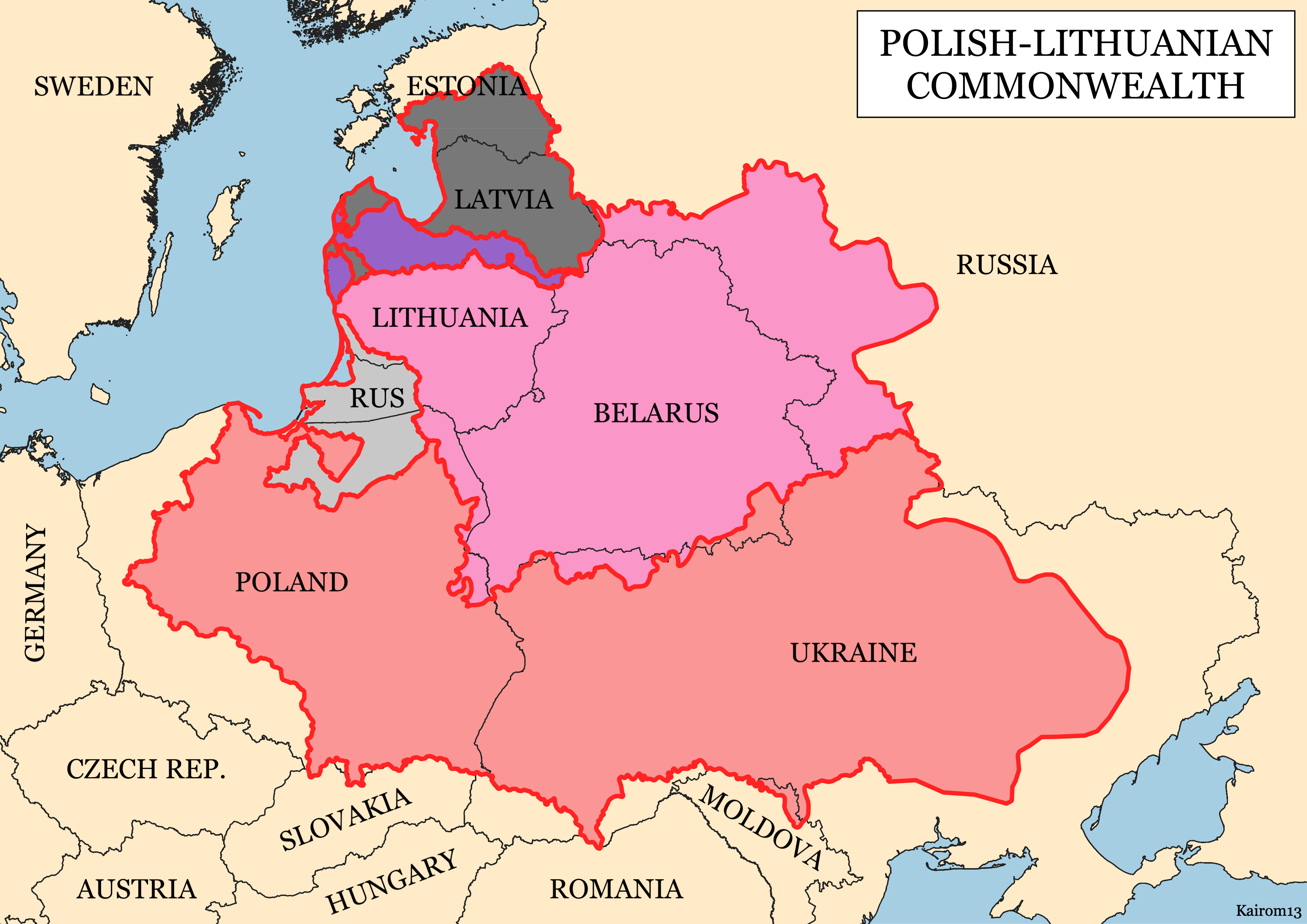
Outline of the Polish–Lithuanian Commonwealth with its major subdivisions after the 1618 Truce of Deulino, superimposed on present-day national borders. Crown of the Kingdom of Poland Grand Duchy of Lithuania Duchy of Livonia Duchy of Prussia, Polish fief Duchy of Courland and Semigallia, Commonwealth fief

Self-identifications during the existence of the Polish–Lithuanian Commonwealth often made use of the Latin 'gens-natione' construct (familial or ethnic origin combined with a national identity). The construct was used by the elite inhabitants of the Grand Duchy of Lithuania, by the Ruthenian (Ukrainian and Belarusian) elites, and in Prussia. Religious affiliation was sometimes added, leading to self-identifications such as Natione Polonus, gente Prussicus (Polish by nationality, of the Prussian people); or Natione Polonus, gente Ruthenus, origine Judaeus (Polish by nationality, of the Ruthenian people, and of Jewish origin). The Latin phrasing reflects the use of that language as a neutral lingua franca, which continued into the 18th century.

The Commonwealth’s nobility (Szlachta) were also bound together during this era by a widespread belief in Sarmatism that transcended ethnic identifications. This origin myth posited that the Commonwealth’s noble class stemmed from a group of warriors from Scythia, that its members were racially distinct from and superior to the other inhabitants of the area, and that various features of the Commonwealth displayed its superiority. The Ruthenian nobility of the Commonwealth subscribed to Sarmatism to some extent as well, as part of a Sarmatian branch known as "Roxolanians". Lithuanian elites developed a theory about their Roman origins – most known is Palemonian myth and Palemonids. The theory of the Roman descent of Lithuanians heretofore mostly used to be considered as emerging during Vytautas the Great times (1392–1430), with Lithuania as a 'corrupted' form of l'ltalia. Maciej Stryjkowski and Augustinus Rotundus were strong proponents of using Latin as an official language of Grand Duchy of Lithuania due to their belief that the Lithuanian language was simply a vernacular variety of Latin. Their belief was based on grammatical similarities of Lithuanian and Latin.

The Lublin Union of 1569 initiated voluntary Polonization of the Lithuanian upper classes, including increasing use of the Polish language, although they retained a strong sense of Lithuanian identity. Those who identified themselves as gente Lithuanus, natione Polonus ("a Lithuanian person of the Polish nation") were distinguished by their accent, customs, and cuisine, and did not perceive the categories as mutually exclusive. A diminishing portion of Lithuanian nobility and most of the rural population in the territories of the Grand Duchy of Lithuania continued to use the Lithuanian language, especially in Samogitia, a practice that reached its nadir in the 18th century, and increased during the 19th-century Lithuanian National Revival. According to Norman Davies, till the Revival, Lithuanian had no agreed upon written form and Lithuanian literature was mostly religious, and the language was rarely heard in the Grand Duchy's capital of Vilnius. Lithuanian humanists Stanislovas Rapolionis (1485–1545), Abraomas Kulvietis (1510–1545), Mikalojus Daukša (1527–1613), Konstantinas Sirvydas (1579–1631) promoted the use of Lithuanian language as part of identity. Famous for his eloquence, Sirvydas spent 10 years of his life preaching sermons at St. John's church in Vilnius (twice a day – once in Lithuanian, and once in Polish).

The adjectival terms Lithuanian and Polish-Lithuanian have been used to describe groups residing in the Commonwealth that did not share the Lithuanian ethnicity nor their pre-dominant Christian (Catholic) faith, for example in the description of the Lipka Tatars (Lithuanian Tatars), a Muslim community, and Litvaks (Lithuanian Jews), a significant Jewish community. Eastern Orthodox and Uniate communities also played a role in the Commonwealth's history.

German minority, heavily represented in the towns (burghers), particularly in the Royal Prussia region, was another group with ties to that culture ("Natione Polonus-gente Prussicus"). Many Prussians from that region identified themselves not as Germans nor Poles, but as the citizens of the multicultural Commonwealth.

During the Great Sejm, when the question of Lithuania's relationship to the Crown, in the sense of their closer fusion, would find expression in the voices of progressive deputies and in patriotic literature, which stated that "the Lithuanian lands are Polish land, and the Polish provinces are, conversely, Lithuanian land."

== 19th and 20th centuries ==
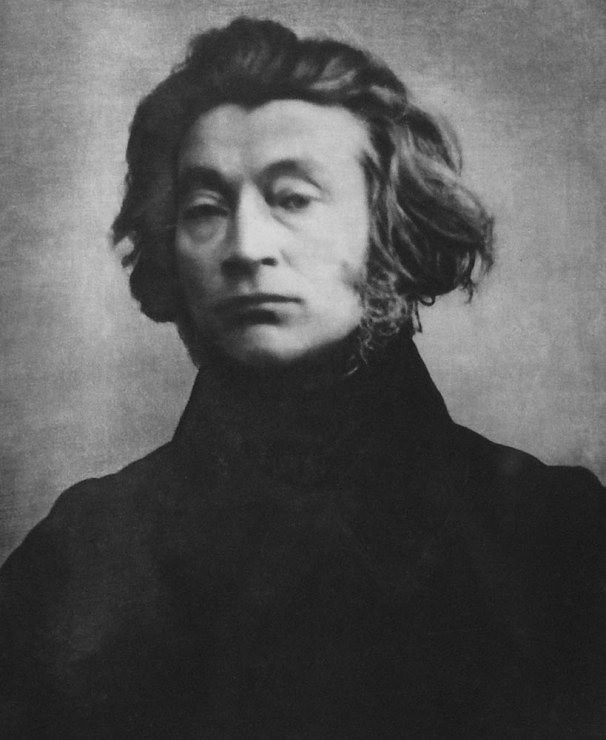
Pan Tadeusz, an enduringly popular 19th-century Polish-language poem by Adam Mickiewicz, opens with the line "Lithuania, my fatherland! You are like health."

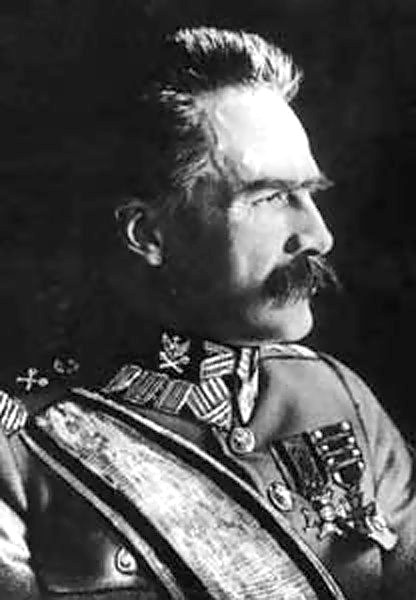
Józef Piłsudski, the most important Polish political leader of the interwar period, often pointed to his Lithuanian ancestry, and hoped to recreate the old Commonwealth

The Commonwealth ceased to exist after the late 18th century Partitions of the Polish–Lithuanian Commonwealth; Poland and Lithuania achieved independence as separate nations after World War I. The development of nationalism through the Lithuanian National Revival was a crucial factor that led to the separation of the modern Lithuanian state from Poland; similar movements took hold in Ukraine and later in Belarus (the territories of both modern countries had formerly been part of the Commonwealth, but did not achieve independence until after the late 20th-century collapse of the Soviet Union). Lithuanian nationalism was a reaction to both the Russification in the Russian partition, and to the threat of further Polonization due to the pressure of Polish culture. The Lithuanian nationalist desire to be separate from Poland was exemplified for example in the adoption of the Czech alphabet over the Polish one for the Lithuanian alphabet. The old cultural identities lost the fight to the more attractive ethnic, religious and linguistic-based ones. Following the abolition of serfdom in the Russian Empire in 1861, social mobility increased, and Lithuanian intellectuals arose from the ranks of the rural populace; language became associated with identity in Lithuania, as elsewhere across Europe.

The dual identity maintained by many leading figures of Polish-Lithuanian history, the gente Lithuanus, natione Polonus attitude still popular in the early 19th century, was increasingly less feasible as the century pressed ahead. The leaders of the unsuccessful January Uprising of 1863–1865 invoked the former commonalities, appealing to "Brother Ruthenians and Lithuanians" and to "Brothers of the Poles of the Mosaic Persuasion". The peasants in the region were largely unmoved since they had never shared the constructed national identity of the elites. While some non-noble inhabitants saw no contradiction in describing themselves as "a Pole, and a Lithuanian as well", dual identity was not widely considered as a matter of course. From this point of view, the conduct of Napoleon in Lithuania is noteworthy. On 1 July 1812, Napoleon formed the Lithuanian Provisional Governing Commission. The provisional government of Lithuania had no connections to Poland. Napoleon also refused to attach the military units consisting of Lithuanians to the Polish ones. On July 14, 1812, the Lithuanian Provisional Governing Commission formally submitted to the General Council of the Confederation of the Kingdom of Poland.

Krajowcy, a group of individuals who tried to maintain their dual identity, emerged in the early years of 20th century in an effort to recreate a federalist Grand Duchy of Lithuania in close association with Poland. Their political program, as well as Piłsudski's idea of a Polish-led federation re-creating the Commonwealth (Międzymorze), became a failure. An analogy can be drawn here with regards to the split between Finnish and Swedish culture (see Finnish Declaration of Independence).

Lithuanian nobleman Mečislovas Davainis-Silvestraitis published newspapers Litwa (Lithuania, 1908–1914) and Lud (People, 1912–1914) in Vilnius with the objective of returning of the nobility into the Lithuanian nation. The main point of returning was to make Lithuanian their family and everyday language. An active figure in the 1863 rebellion, writer and publicist Mikalojus Akelaitis wrote:

We should lift up the Lithuanian language, wrest away from scorn that language which has the Sanskrit greatness, the Latin force, the Greek refinement, and the Italian melodiousness.

Simonas Daukantas (1793 – 1864), who wrote the voluminous history of Lithuania in Lithuanian Darbai senųjų lietuvių ir žemaičių (Deeds of the Ancient Lithuanians and Samogitians), and identified the language as the determining factor of nationality was rather critical regarding the Polish–Lithuanian union and considered it to be the cause of the Lithuanian state declining. The gulf between those who chose to use Polish and those who chose to use Lithuanian was growing, and both groups began to see the very history of the Commonwealth in a different light. Events such as the Polish-Lithuanian War, the 1919 Polish coup d'état attempt in Lithuania, and the conflict over Vilnius Region led to major tensions in the interwar Polish-Lithuanian relations.

It was a time of choosing citizenship based on person's values and language. The most iconic case is the family of Narutowicz (Narutavičius) – Stanislovas Narutavičius became one of the twenty signatories of the Act of Independence of Lithuania, while his brother Gabriel Narutowicz became the first president of Poland. A prominent Lithuanian zoologist and biologist, and one of the founders of Vytautas Magnus University Tadas Ivanauskas chose to be a Lithuanian, while his other two brothers – Jerzy and Stanisław became Polish and Vacłaŭ – Belarusian.

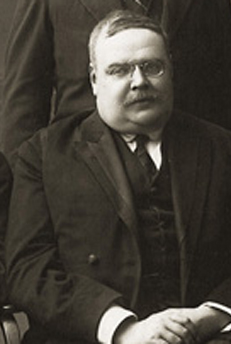
Mykolas Römeris, was a member of Piłsudski legions, but later chose to be a citizen of Lithuania

Tomas Venclova notes that the meaning of the terms: "a Lithuanian" and "a Pole" changed over the centuries.

Polish-speaking Lithuanians often found it outrageous to be called 'Poles'. <...> As one Lithuanian 'Pole', Michal Juckniewicz, angrily told Lithuanian nationalists: "Jagiełło, Chodkiewicz, Mickiewicz, Piłsudski and I – these are Lithuanians [using the word Litwini, the Polish word for Lithuanians] – and you; you are Lietuvisy [using a polonised form of the Lithuanian word for 'Lithuanians']

Józef Piłsudski, an important interwar Polish politician, significantly responsible for Poland's regained independence in the aftermath of World War I, planner of the 1919 Polish coup d'état attempt in Lithuania and orchestrator of the Żeligowski's Mutiny that brought the disputed Vilnius Region into Poland, often drew attention to his Lithuanian ancestry, and briefly pursued the re-creation of the old Commonwealth. In light of the other great plan for post-World War I order, the Bolshevik intention to spread the communist revolution through the Red Army, his goal of re-constituting the Commonwealth "could only be achieved by war." Poland was not alone in its newfound opportunities and troubles. With the collapse of Russian and German occupying authorities, virtually all of the newly independent neighbours began fighting over borders: Romania fought with Hungary over Transylvania, Yugoslavia with Italy over Rijeka, Poland with Czechoslovakia over Cieszyn Silesia, with Germany over Poznań, with Ukraine over Eastern Galicia, with Lithuania over Vilnius Region. Spreading Communist influences resulted in Communist revolutions in Munich, Berlin, Budapest and Prešov, and finally, in the Polish-Soviet War. Speaking of that period, Winston Churchill commented: "The war of giants has ended, the wars of the pygmies began." Eventually, the bad blood created but those conflicts, and the staunch opposition by (primarily) Polish and Lithuanian nationalists towards the federation idea, and finally the Peace of Riga, in which Poland abandoned the Belarusian and Ukrainian independence cause, would doom the idea of the Międzymorze federation. The failure to create a strong counterbalance to Germany and Soviet Union, such as Międzymorze, which Piłsudski saw as a counterweight to Russian and German imperialism, according to some historians, doomed those countries to their eventual fate as victims of World War II.

The Nobel Prize-winning poet Czesław Miłosz often wrote of his dual Polish and Lithuanian identities. Anatol Lieven lists Miłosz among "great Polish figures", at the same time noting he is referred to as "one of the last citizens of the Grand Duchy of Lithuania", and that his use of the word "Lithuanian" was "very different from the mono-ethnic vision of many Lithuanian nationalists". Miłosz himself compared the situation of Polish Lithuanians in the 19th century to that of educated Scots such as Walter Scott, whose works, while written in English rather than Gaelic, were centered on Scots characters and traditions. Anatol Lieven makes a counterpoint by describing Scottish aspirations to independence as essentially crushed at the 1746 Battle of Culloden, which in his view made Scott's path less difficult, and sees pre-1939 Polish-Lithuanian culture as a combination of romantic idealization of medieval Lithuania and contempt for modern Lithuanians. Similarly, he states: "For educated Poles before the Second World War, Lithuania was not a nation but an assemblage of peasants speaking a peculiar dialect", an attitude that further served to alienate the new Lithuanian intelligentsia. Czesław Miłosz wrote in his letter to Lithuanian poet Tomas Venclova, his long-time friend and associate during exile: "There were some attacks against me in the Lithuanian émigré press because, even though I am a relative of Oscar Miłosz [a Lithuanian poet and diplomat], I am a Pole, not a Lithuanian." Despite this, radical Polish nationalists planned to protest Miłosz's funeral, claiming (among other reasons) that he was "not Polish enough", though the protest ultimately was not staged.

== Modern usage ==
The use of the expressions "Polish-Lithuanian," "Polonized Lithuanian," and "Pole of Lithuanian descent" persists in recent biographical descriptions of the Radziwiłł family and in those of several notable 19th and 20th-century figures such as Emilia Plater, Józef Piłsudski, Adam Mickiewicz, Czesław Miłosz, and Gabriel Narutowicz, among others. At the same time, other sources simply use the word "Polish", just as the word "Poland" is sometimes used to refer to the Polish–Lithuanian Commonwealth itself. The usage of the term "Polish" transcends but does not replace the word "Lithuanian", as it was similar to the usage of the term "British" to refer to the British Commonwealth, comprising the English, Scottish and Welsh parts; however as a different term was not used in the English language, the result can be confusing at times. An analogy has also been drawn between the use of Polish-Lithuanian and that of Anglo-Irish as adjectives. Crucially, the pre-nationalistic usage of "Polish-Lithuanian" refers to (shared) culture, whereas the more modern, nationalistic usage of "Polish" and "Lithuanian" refers to ethnicity.

Lithuania and Poland continue to dispute the origins of some cultural icons with roots in both cultures who are described in their national discourses as Polish-Lithuanian, as simply Polish, or as simply Lithuanian. The poet Adam Mickiewicz is an exemplar of the controversy.

Today's Republic of Poland considers itself a successor to the Commonwealth, and stresses the common history of both nations, whereas the Republic of Lithuania, re-established at the end of World War I, saw the participation of the Lithuanian state in the old Polish–Lithuanian Commonwealth mostly in a negative light and idealized the pre-Commonwealth Grand Duchy although this attitude has been changing recently. Modern Polish-Lithuanian relations have improved, but their respective views of history can still differ.

== See also ==
- Names of the Polish–Lithuanian Commonwealth
- Lithuanian nationalism
- Polish nationalism
- Belarusian nationalism
- Rzeczpospolita
- Other unifying national identities: Yugoslavs, Soviet people, British people, All-Russian nation

== Sources ==
- Davies, Norman (2005). God's Playground. Vol. 2: 1795 to the present. Columbia University Press. ISBN 978-0-231-12819-3.
- Karin Friedrich; Barbara M. Pendzich (2009). Citizenship and identity in a multinational commonwealth: Poland-Lithuania in context, 1550-1772. BRILL. ISBN 978-90-04-16983-8.
- Genzelis, Bronius (2007). The restitution of Lithuania's statehood. ISBN 978-9955-415-66-4.
- Gomułka, Stanisław; Polonsky, Antony (1991). Polish Paradoxes. Routledge. ISBN 978-0-415-07146-8.
- Scales, Len; Zimmer, Oliver (2005). Power and the nation in European history. Cambridge University Press. ISBN 978-0-521-84580-9.
- Stone, Daniel (2001). The Polish-Lithuanian state, 1386–1795. University of Washington Press. ISBN 978-0-295-98093-5.
- Sužiedėlis, Saulius (Fall 1981). "Language and Social Class in Southwestern Lithuania before 1864". Lituanus. 27 (3). Archived from the original on 6 September 2008.
- Prizel, Ilya (1998). National Identity and Foreign Policy: Nationalism and Leadership in Poland, Russia and Ukraine. Cambridge University Press. ISBN 978-0-521-57697-0.
- Wandycz, Piotr S. (1974). The Lands of Partitioned Poland, 1795–1918. University of Washington Press. ISBN 978-0-295-95358-8.
- Wandycz, Piotr S. (1980). The United States and Poland. Harvard University Press. ISBN 978-0-674-92685-1.
- Wandycz, Piotr S. (2001). The Price of Freedom: a History of East Central Europe from the Middle Ages to the Present (2nd ed.). Routledge. ISBN 978-0-415-25491-5.

=== Lithuanian-language ===
- Mastianica, Olga (2016). Bajorija lietuvių tautiniame projekte: (XIX a. pabaiga - XX a. pradžia) [Nobility in the Lithuanian national project: (late 19th century - early 20th century)] (in Lithuanian). Vilnius: Lietuvos istorijos institutas. ISBN 978-609-8183-13-9.

=== Polish-language ===
- Mościcki, Henryk (1917). Generał Jasiński i powstanie kościuszkowskie (in Polish). Warsaw: Gebethner i Wolff.
