= West Russianism =

Ideology claiming Belarusians are a branch of the Russian nation

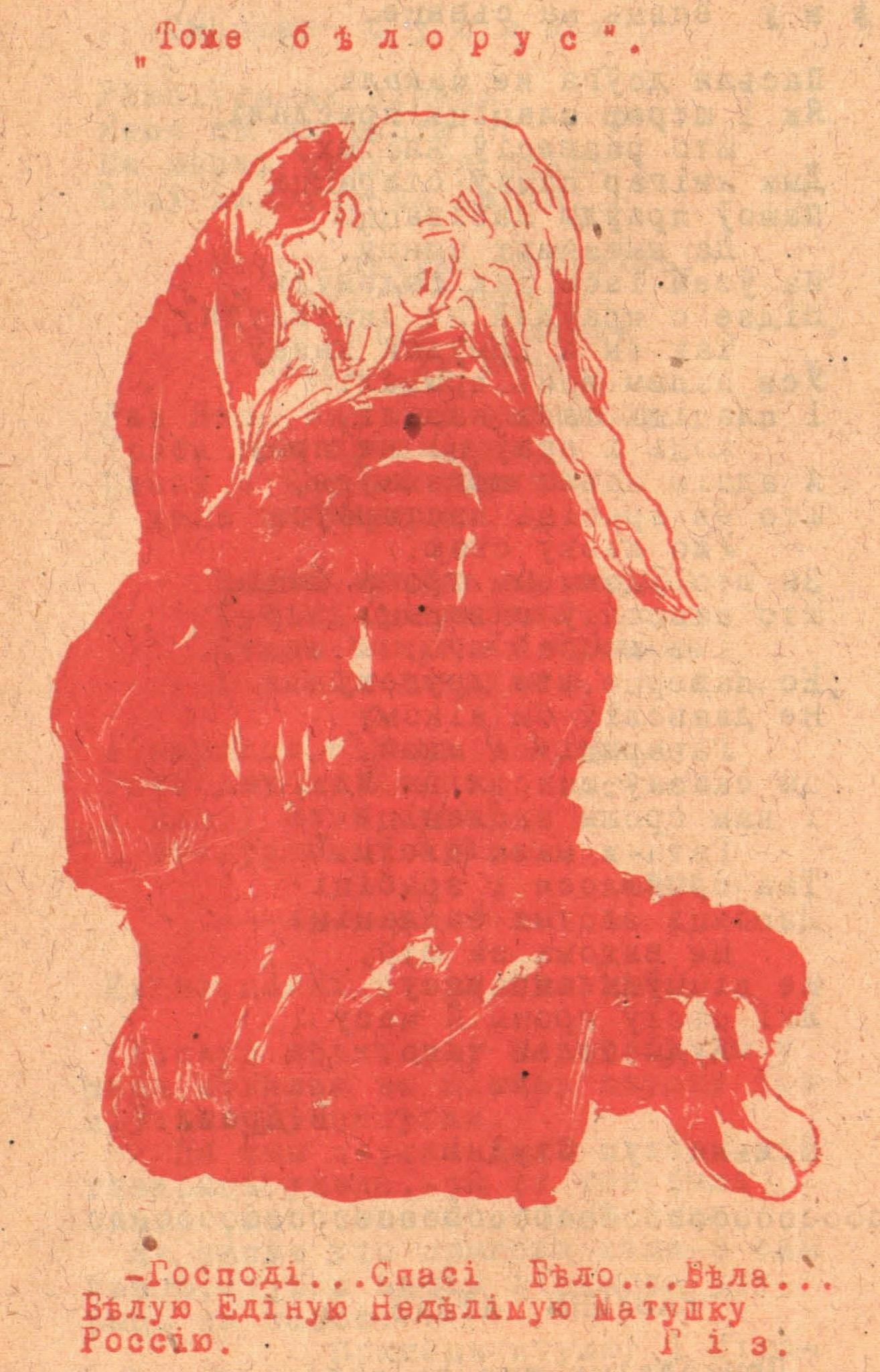
«God… Save White… White… White One Indivisible Mother Russia». A cartoon from the Belarusian magazine «Avadzień» on the Orthodox clergy in White Rus', which served to promote the ideas of Western Russianism

West Russianism (Russian: западнорусизм, zapadnorusizm; Belarusian: заходнерусізм, zakhodnierusizm) is a historical and ideological movement in the scientific, socio-political, ethno-confessional, and cultural life of the Northwestern Krai of the Russian Empire (modern Belarus). It is based on the postulate that Belarusians are not a distinct people, but an ethnographic group of the triune Russian nation, and that Belarus is an integral regional part of Russia. It is the Belarusian analogue to the concept of Little Russian identity, which played a significant role in the self-identification of the southwestern governorates of the Russian Empire. The ideology emerged in the late 1830s and expanded significantly after the suppression of the January Uprising (1863–1864).

== History ==
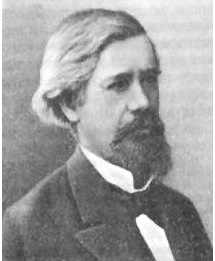
Mikhail Koyalovich, one of the prominent ideologists of West Russianism.

According to the Belarusian historian Aliaksandr Cvikievič, the formation of the ideas later termed West Russianism began during the era of the Polish–Lithuanian Commonwealth as a reaction to the decrees of the Synod of Zamość (1720), which obliged the Greek Catholic clergy to bring their worship and lifestyle closer to Roman Catholic canons.

According to Yakov Treshchenok, the catalyst for West Russianism was the so-called "dissident question" (the issue of unequal rights for Catholics and representatives of other confessions). He asserts that the foundational complex of West Russian ideas was formed under the ideological leadership of the Orthodox Bishop of Belarus, George Konissky, in the second half of the 18th century. The development of West Russianism was also influenced by the ideas of Slavophilia, developed by Aleksey Khomyakov, Ivan Kireyevsky, and Ivan Aksakov.

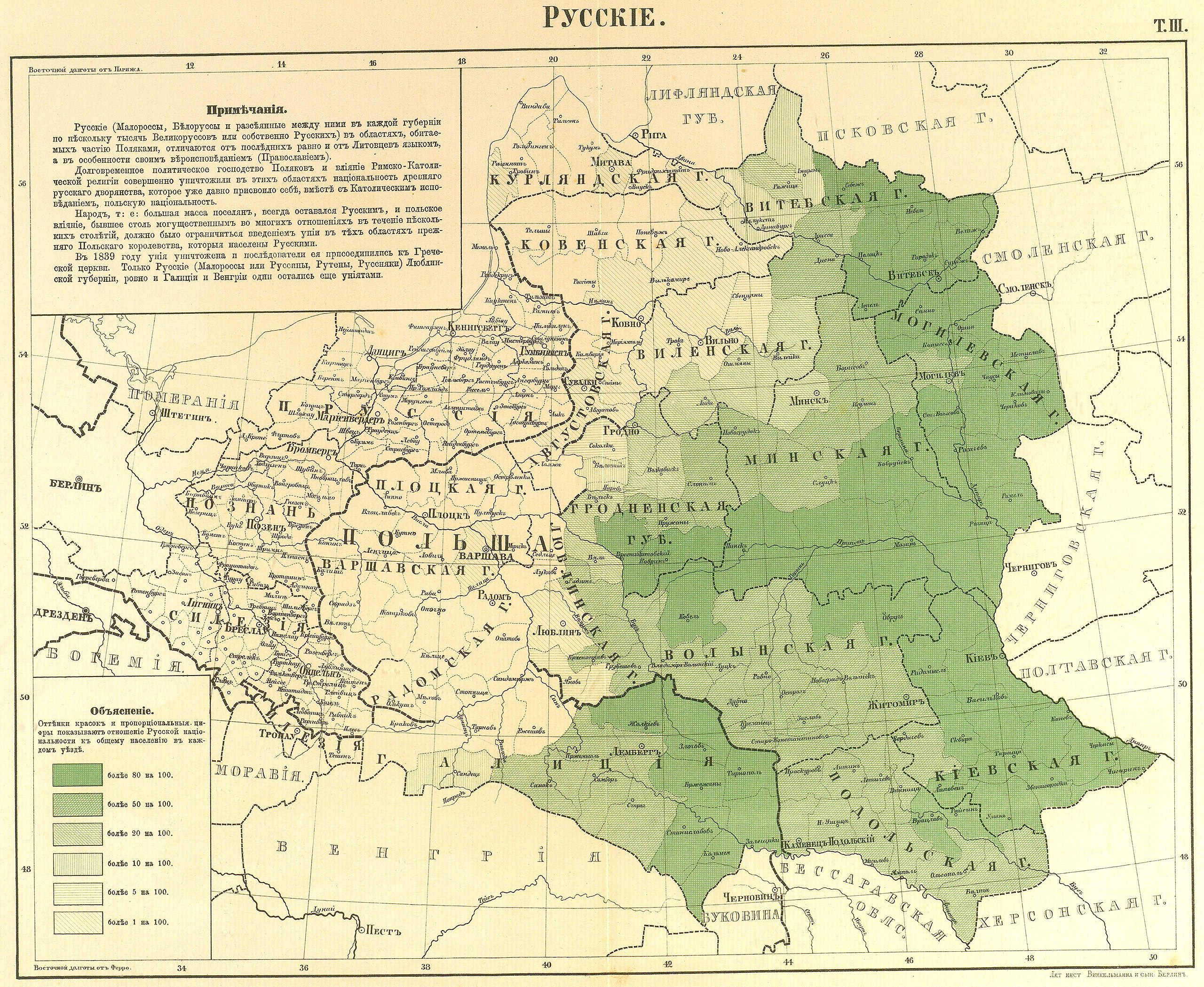
Ethnographic atlas of the western Russian governorates (1863) by R. Erckert, heavily influenced by West Russianist concepts.

The ideas of West Russianism developed within the circle of the Bishop Joseph Semashko, particularly in connection with the Synod of Polotsk in 1839, which abolished the Uniate Church in the Russian Empire. The theory of West Russianism was academically formalized in the works of the Russian historian Mikhail Koyalovich (born in the Grodno Governorate), who introduced the term "Western Russia" into academic discourse to denote the modern territory of Belarus.

In 1863, Koyalovich ridiculed the "bucolic view" of "Polish writers" that Lithuania and Poland existed in "blissful peace." He characterized Lithuania by the presence of "Russian regions," which he distinguished from the "Muscovite state" (Eastern Russia, the realm of Ivan III). Koyalovich actively used the word "Belorussians" to denote the population of the Minsk, Vilna, Vitebsk, Mogilev, Grodno, and parts of the Pskov and Smolensk governorates. According to him, Belorussians were distinct from "Little Russians" (the population of the Kyiv, Podolia, and Volhynia governorates) and "before the Tatar yoke" constituted "one people". He emphasized that the inhabitants of Western Russia always called themselves Russian. The principle of unity, in his view, lay in faith ("Russian by faith") and citizenship. However, Koyalovich preferred to call Belorussians and Little Russians "Western-Russian Slavs." He used the term "Lithuanians" to refer to the Samogitians (the population of the Kovno Governorate). According to Koyalovich, it was only due to the Union of Krewo in 1386 that the Russians of Lithuania began to be drawn into the "Polish and Latin nation," i.e., "Polonized" and "Latinized," a process that peaked with the Union of Lublin in 1569. He viewed the "frenzy of Ioann" (the policies of Ivan the Terrible, which compromised the "Russian cause") and the "Lithuanian boyars," who desired "szlachta privileges," as obstacles to the reunification of Western and Eastern Russia. He blamed the Cossacks for "chaotic unconsciousness," making them more terrible than the Tatars.

Other prominent representatives of West Russianism included Grigory Kiprianovich, Platon Zhukovich, Konstantin Kharlampovich, Afanasy Yarushevich, Arseny Turtsevich, and A. Demyanovich. Communities of West Russianists formed around several publications, such as the journals "Vestnik Zapadnoi Rossii" (edited by Ksenofont Govorsky), "Krestyanin", "Okrainy Rossii", and the newspapers "Den", "Moskovskie Novosti", "Novoye Vremya", "Severo-Zapadnaya Zhizn", "Minskoye Slovo", "Minskoye Russkoye Slovo", and "Belorusskiy Vestnik".

The terms "Belarusian people" and "White Rus'" were not widely used among the general population at the time. As the philologist and ethnographer Yefim Karsky, who was close to West Russianist circles, wrote in 1903:

At present, the common people in Belorussia do not know this name. To the question: who are you? the commoner answers — Russian, and if he is a Catholic, he calls himself either a Catholic or a Pole; sometimes he calls his homeland Lithuania, or simply says that he is "tutejszy" (local), naturally contrasting himself with a person speaking Great Russian, as a newcomer to the Western Krai.

— Yefim Karsky, Belarusians. Vol. I, Ch. IV., p. 116.

According to some researchers, in pre-revolutionary Russia, West Russianist views were dominant among the Belarusian population. A. D. Gronsky notes that Soviet historiography, in contrast, maintained the view that the absolute majority of Belarusians supported Belarusian nationalism. Overall, West Russianism significantly influenced the views of the Belarusian intelligentsia, especially in the eastern part of the region. As Mitrofan Dovnar-Zapolsky pointed out, there were "left" and "right" wings among West Russians, attributing greater or lesser importance to the distinctiveness of Belarusians.

According to historian Alexander Bendin, in the Northwestern Krai, the confessional factor played a leading role in producing ethnic differences. He argues that until 1917 and beyond, the Belarusian population at the mass level did not feel the need to politically formalize its existence as a distinct ethnic group, separate from Great Russians and Little Russians. Instead, they identified as part of the "Russian nationality," having regional peculiarities and speaking the Belarusian dialect, but remaining an integral part of the Russian nation. Bendin points to the fact that Russian nationalists and Octobrists won an absolute majority of seats in the Belarusian governorates during the elections to the Third State Duma and Fourth State Duma as confirmation of this.

In the 1920s and 1930s, the Bolshevik authorities implemented the policy of Belarusization to foster a separate Belarusian national identity. This policy, however, faced resistance from some segments of the population. Concurrently, West Russianism and West Russian identity were persecuted as obstacles to the national consolidation of Belarusians.

Ideologists of Belarusian nationalism, such as Aliaksandr Cvikievič and Vaclau Lastouski, attempted to scientifically prove the invalidity of West Russianism. Although the scaling back of "Belarusization" in the early 1930s and the onset of repressions against "national democrats" reduced the intensity of attacks on West Russianism, it remained an undesirable "reactionary" doctrine for the Soviet authorities. Only a few figures of the Belarusian diaspora, such as Jurka Vićbič, continued to write about West Russianism. Vićbič noted that some representatives of the left wing of West Russians, including Dovnar-Zapolsky, were ideologically close to the "Belarusian national liberation movement" but, for various reasons, did not join it.

Historian Alexander Bendin argued that the criticism of West Russianism was fundamentally flawed, stating: "First of all, it must be clearly stated that the definition of 'West Russianism' given by A. Cvikievič cannot be classified as scientific".

== Neo-West Russianism ==
In the 1990s, proponents of West Russian ideas began to voice their views again in Belarus. This group included historians, philosophers, religious scholars, sociologists, economists, and lawyers, such as Yakov Treshchenok, Valentina Teplova, Alexander Bendin, Alexander Gronsky, Aleksey Khoteev, Valery Cherepitsa, Sergey Shiptenko, Lev Krishtapovich, Kirill Averyanov, Dmitry Kunitsky, Gordey Shcheglov, Vsevolod Shimov, and Cheslav Kirvel. They argued that the foundations of scientific Belarusian historiography, philology, ethnography, and folkloristics were laid specifically by the works of West Russianists. The viewpoint was formulated that West Russianism is also a version of the Belarusian national movement.

During the same period, criticism of West Russianism from representatives of the Belarusian national movement also renewed. Historian and literary scholar Alaksiej Kauka gave an exclusively negative characterization of West Russianism, defining it as a "cadaveric virus in the Belarusian national organism" and a precursor to Soviet and post-Soviet assimilationist policies.

Many supporters of West Russianism consider the term "Neo-West Russianism" inadequate and unacceptable.

According to political scientist and Slavist Oleg Nemensky, West Russianism is the most natural and historical direction of thought in Belarus. He believes that the modern intellectual movement of West Russianism is engaged in reviving the vast pre-revolutionary heritage of West Russian thought and could once again become a crucial factor in Belarusian cultural life and, eventually, a component of state ideology. Nemensky argues that the victory of West Russianism can, in a sense, be declared today, as Belarusians have firmly returned to Orthodoxy and overwhelmingly desire to live in a unified political and informational space with Russia and Ukraine.

== Prominent figures ==
- Pyotr Bessonov
- Ksenofont Govorsky
- Archbishop Michael (Golubovich)
- Ivan Grigorovich
- Platon Zhukovich
- Yefim Karsky
- Grigory Kiprianovich
- Mikhail Koyalovich
- Alexander Milovidov
- Ivan Nosovich
- Aleksey Sapunov
- Joseph Semashko
- Yevdokim Romanov
- Dmitry Skrynchenko
- Ivan Solonevich
- Lukyan Solonevich
- Yakov Treshchenok
- Konstantin Kharlampovich
- Afanasy Yarushevich

== See also ==
- Little Russian identity
- Western Krai
- Northwestern Krai
- Southwestern Krai
- Russification of Belarus
- Krajowcy

== Bibliography ==
- Долбилов, М. Д. (2010). Русский край, чужая вера: Этноконфессиональная политика империи в Литве и Белоруссии при Александре II [Russian Krai, Foreign Faith: Ethnoconfessional Policy of the Empire in Lithuania and Belorussia under Alexander II] (in Russian). Москва: Новое литературное обозрение. p. 1000.
- Долбилов, М.; Миллер, А., eds. (2006). Западные окраины Российской империи [The Western Borderlands of the Russian Empire] (in Russian). Москва: Новое литературное обозрение. p. 608.
- Каппелер, А. (2000). Россия — многонациональная империя: Возникновение. История. Распад [Russia - a multinational empire: Emergence. History. Collapse] (in Russian). Москва: Традиция. p. 344.
- Киселев, А. А. Конфессиональные аспекты кадровой политики российских властей в полицейских учреждениях МВД белорусских губерний во второй половине XIX — начале XX вв. [Confessional aspects of the personnel policy of the Russian authorities in the police institutions of the Ministry of Internal Affairs of the Belarusian governorates in the second half of the 19th - early 20th centuries]. Западнорус (in Russian).
- Корнилов, И. (1901). Русское дело в Северо-Западном крае. Материалы для истории Виленского учебного округа преимущественно в муравьевскую эпоху [The Russian Cause in the Northwestern Krai. Materials for the History of the Vilna Educational District primarily in the Muravyov era] (in Russian). Санкт-Петербург: Тип. А. Лопухина. p. 420.
- Коялович, М. О. (2006). Чтения по истории западной России [Readings on the history of western Russia] (in Russian). Минск: Беларуская Энцыклапедыя. p. 480. ISBN 985-11-0348-9.
- Киприанович, Г. Я. (2006). Исторический очерк православия, католичества и унии в Белоруссии и Литве, с древнейшего до настоящего времени [Historical outline of Orthodoxy, Catholicism and the Uniate Church in Belorussia and Lithuania, from ancient times to the present] (in Russian). Минск: Изд-во Белорусского Экзархата. p. 351.
- Литвинский, А. В. (2004). Западноруссизм в российской историографии второй половины XIX — начала XX века [West Russianism in Russian historiography of the second half of the 19th - early 20th century] (in Russian). Минск.
- Цьвікевіч, А. (1993). «Западно-руссизм»: Нарысы з гісторыі грамадскай мысьлі на Беларусі у ХІХ і пачатку ХХ в. ["West-Russianism": Essays on the history of social thought in Belarus in the 19th and early 20th centuries] (in Belarusian) (2nd ed.). Мінск: Навука і тэхніка. p. 352.
- Rodkiewicz, W. (1998). Russian Nationality Policy in the Western Provinces of the Empire (1863—1905). Lublin: Scientific Society of Lublin. p. 257.
- Staliūnas, D. (2007). Making Russians. Meaning and Practice of Russification in Lithuania and Belarus after 1863. Amsterdam—New York: Rodopi. p. 465.
