= All-Russian nation =

Imperial and modern Russian irredentist ideology

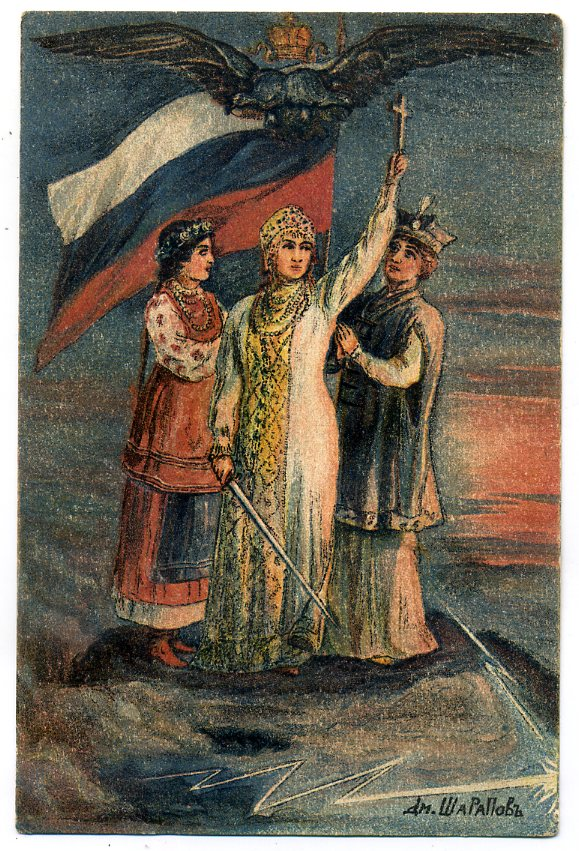
Allegory of the "triune Russian people" in a poster from the Russian Empire (1905)

The All-Russian nation or All-Russian people (Russian: общерусский народ, romanized: obshcherussky narod) or triune Russian people (Russian: триединый русский народ, romanized: triyediny russky narod), also called the triune Russian nation or pan-Russian nation, is the term for the Imperial Russian and modern Russian irredentist ideology that sees the Russian nation as comprising a "trinity" of sub-nations: Great Russia, Little Russia, and White Russia, which are contextually identified with Russians, Ukrainians, and Belarusians respectively. Above all, the basis of the ideology's upholding of an inclusive Russian identity is centered around bringing all East Slavs under its fold.

An imperial dogma focused on nation-building became popular in the Tsardom of Russia and the Russian Empire, where it was consolidated as the official state ideology; the sentiment of the triune nationality of "All-Russian" was embraced by many imperial subjects, including Jews and Germans, and ultimately served as the foundation of the Russian Empire.

== Etymology ==
English-language scholarly works refer to this concept as Greater Russia, All-Russian, pan-Russian or triune Russian nation.

- In Russian, it is referred to as the Triyedinyi russkii narod (Russian: Триединый русский народ). In the 19th century, the idea was also referred to as an obshcherusskii (one-Russian or common-Russian) nationality.
- In Ukrainian, it is referred to as the Tryiedynyi rosiiskyi narod (Ukrainian: Триєдиний російський народ) or pan-ruskyi narod (Ukrainian: пан-руський народ).
- In Belarusian, it is referred to as the Tryjadziny ruski narod (Belarusian: Трыадзіны рускі народ).

Note that in this context the three East Slavic languages use the word narod, which translates as "people". Narod ("people") in these languages expresses the sense of "a lower-level, ethno-cultural agglomeration", whereas in English the word "nation" (as used by scholars) also refers to a large group of people who share a common language, culture, ethnicity, descent, or history.

=== Nomenclature ===
The Slavs adapted the toponym Little or Lesser Rus from the Greek term, used by the Ecumenical Patriarchs of Constantinople from the 14th century (it first appeared in church documents in 1335). The terms originated from the Byzantines, who identified the northern and southern parts of the lands of Rus as: Greater Rus (Μεγάλη Ῥωσσία, Megálē Rhōssía) and Little Rus (Μικρὰ Ῥωσσία, Mikrà Rhōssía). The terms were geographic in nature; the Byzantines used them to distinguish between the jurisdictions of the metropolitanates of Moscow and of Halych; "Little" (or "Inner") referred to the region closer to Byzantium, Galicia; "Greater" (or "Outer") to the regions further away and more remote, Muscovy.

In the Russian language, the word Russian (Russian: русский, Russkiy) is a single adjective to the word Rus (Slavic languages: Русь). In the period of the Russian Empire, from the 17th century to the 20th century, the word Russian often referred to the All-Russian (East Slav) peoples, as opposed to ethnic Russians, who were known as Great Russians. In this period, the All-Russian (Imperial) and Great Russian (ethnic) identity became increasingly intertwined and indistinguishable among the Russian population.

In the West, the name "Ruthenia" denoted the former lands of Rus' where those Eastern Slavs lived (many of whom later became subjects of the Polish–Lithuanian Commonwealth) who included both Ukrainians and Belarusians. In the 17th century the term Malorossiya was introduced into the Russian language; in English the term is often translated Little Russia or Little Rus, depending on the context. Ukrainians, in varying circumstances, have called themselves Ruthenians (alternatively ruski, rusyny, or rutentsi) and Little Russians (malorosy). Rusyns in western Ukraine have adopted the name "Rusnak". In more recent times, the term Little Russian began to acquire pejorative overtones, denoting both lesser importance and provincial backwardness; in contemporary Ukrainian the term has become entirely derogatory, associated with one who "lacks national consciousness" and with those who would identify as a branch of the all-Russian ethnos. Historically, Ukrainians have also used the term khokhol amongst themselves as a form of ethnic self-identification, visibly separate from the Great Russians; Russians commonly use this term as an ethnic slur for Ukrainians, and frequently use it in derogatory or condescending fashion.

As a matter of distinction, while Ukrainians widely were referred to as Ruthenians, members of the Ukrainian Russophile movement (also known as Muscophiles) were known as "Old Ruthenians", whereas Ukrainophiles were known as "Young Ruthenians".

== History ==
=== Background ===
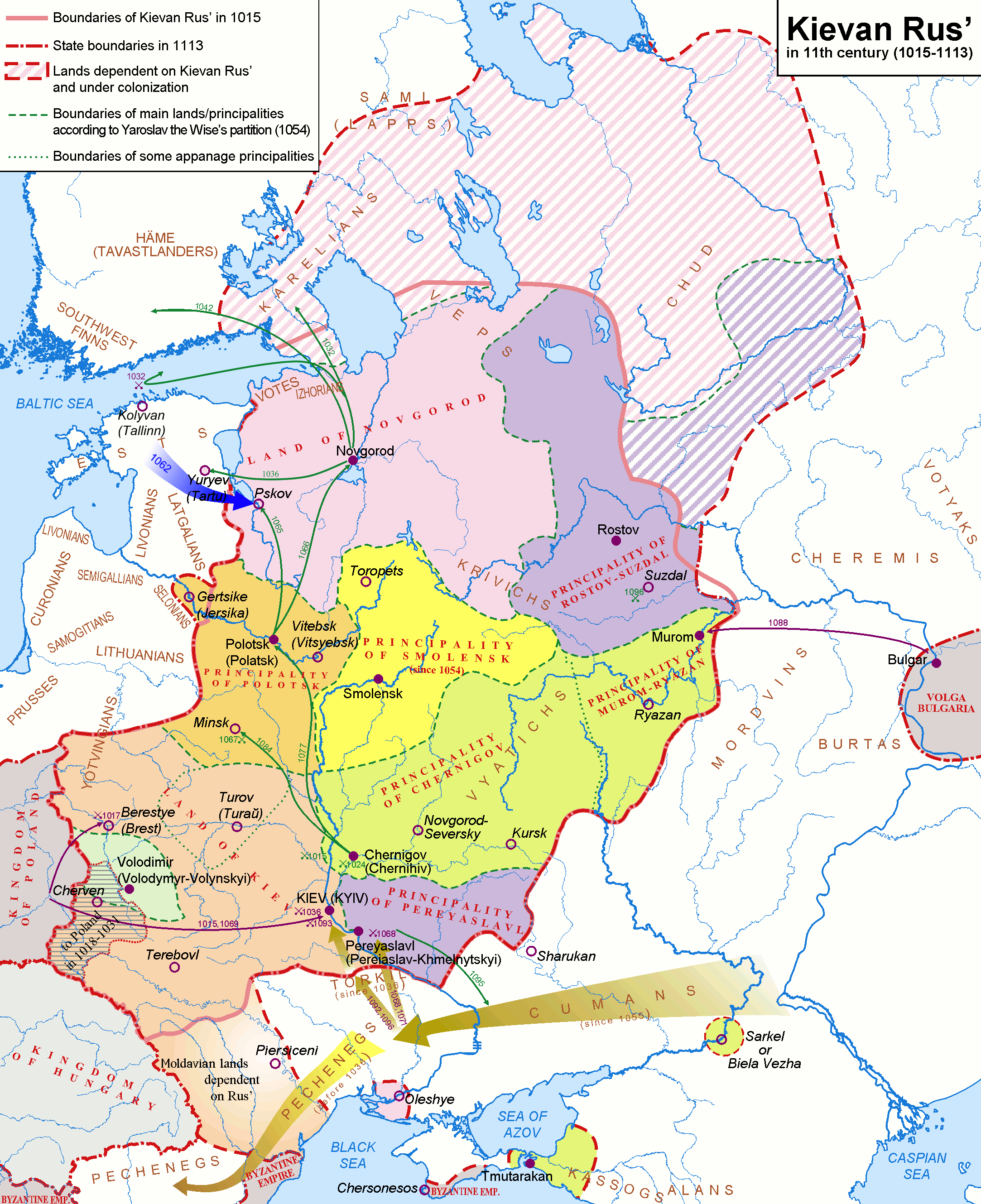
Principalities of Kievan Rus', 1054–1132

The disintegration, or parcelling, of the polity of Kievan Rus' in the 11th century resulted in considerable population shifts and a political, social, and economic regrouping. The resultant effect of these forces coalescing was the marked emergence of new peoples. While these processes began long before the fall of Kiev, its fall expedited these gradual developments into a significant linguistic and ethnic differentiation among the Rus' people into Ukrainians, Belarusians, and Russians. All of this was emphasized by the subsequent polities these groups migrated into: southwestern and western Rus', where the Ruthenian and later Ukrainian and Belarusian identities developed, was subject to Lithuanian and later Polish influence; whereas the (Great) Russian ethnic identity that developed in the Vladimir-Suzdal principality and the Novgorodian Russian north, an area also inhabited by Finno-Ugric, Slavic and Tatar-Turkic tribes, (Note: As early as the 9th century, Rus' settlements established small farming communities along the Volga river, absorbing Finno-Ugric tribes that had previously inhabited the region. Between the Oka and White Sea, one can still see many names of Finno-Ugric origin for cities, villages, and rivers.) isolated from its Ruthene relatives.

The two states (Galicia-Volhynia and Vladimir-Suzdal) differed in their relationship with other powers, entered into alliances with different partners, belonged to different civilizational and commercial communities, and were in more intimate contact with their neighbouring states and societies than with each other.

— Professor Jaroslaw Pelenski

Muscovite princes considered themselves to be rightful heirs of the "Kievan inheritance", and associated their survival with fulfilling the historical destiny of reunifying the lands of Rus'. This ideology was ostensibly seen in their given titles (grand princes and tsars) which defined themselves as rulers of "all Rus'". In 1328 Ivan I of Moscow persuaded Theognost, the Metropolitan of Kiev, to settle in Moscow; from which point forward the title changed to "of Kiev and [all Rus']"—a title which was retained until the mid-fifteenth century. Later, in 1341 Simeon of Moscow was appointed Grand Prince "of all Russia" by the Khan of the Mongol Golden Horde. Ivan III, Grand Duchy of Moscow, considered himself heir to all former Kievan Rus' lands and in 1493 he assumed the title of gosudar, or "Sovereign of All Russia". This trend continued to evolve and by the mid-17th century transformed into "Tsar of All Great, Little, and White Rus'", and with Peter I's creation of a Russian Empire, "Little Russian" came be a demonym for all inhabitants of Ukraine under imperial rule.

While the political reintegration of the Rus' can be seen in the politics of Russia's tsardom, the Kievan Synopsis, written in the 16th century by the Prussian-born archimandrite of the Kiev Caves monastery Innocent Gizel, contains a description of the ancient unity between the "Russian peoples". This is seen as the earliest historical record of a common Rus' ethnic identity. Meanwhile, in the late 16th century, the word 'Ukraine' was used extensively to describe Poland's "borderland" region (cf. krajina), and local Ruthenian (Rus') inhabitants adopted the Ukrainian identity to "distinguish their nationality from the Polish". Ukrainian Cossack leader Bohdan Khmelnytsky also declared himself the "ruler of all Rus'" in 1648, after driving the Polish-Lithuanian Commonwealth out of Ukraine in the Khmelnytsky Uprising.

=== 18th century ===
Very shortly after Catherine II's ascension to the throne she issued the ukase of May 1763, declaring the Cossack Hetmanate to be administered according to 'Little Russian rights'. This prompted the Hetmanate's General Military Chancellery of Hlukhiv to be convened the following September by Hetman Kyrylo Rozumovskyi, at which the council accepted the imperial (All-Russian) narrative by demanding recognition of Peter I's decree of 1708 which stated that "no other people had such privileges as the Little Russian nation", and indicated their descent from and the loyalty to the 'Little Russian nation' (in whose ranks they included everyone except the peasants). Despite recognition of this apparent unity, the demands of the Hlukhiv council attempted to establish "a distinctive political, social, and economic system in the Hetmanate", and fulfill the vision by Ukrainian elites of a Little and Great Russia as separate countries united only by a familiar head of state.

The concept of the "All-Russian nation" gained in political importance near the end of the 18th century as a means of legitimizing Russian imperial claims to the eastern territories of the partitioned Polish–Lithuanian Commonwealth. 'Russianness' as an ethnic concept stressed the differences between the East Slav population from the rest. This concept extended to the ideas of being united within "Mother Russia" and having "one blood" (edinokrovnye). Russian culture in this period was also marked with an adoption of many western ideas, which made it attractive to others as progressive, rather than backward. Traditional customs and values in Russia were viewed as backwardness by the Western observers in 18th and 19th centuries.

=== 19th century ===
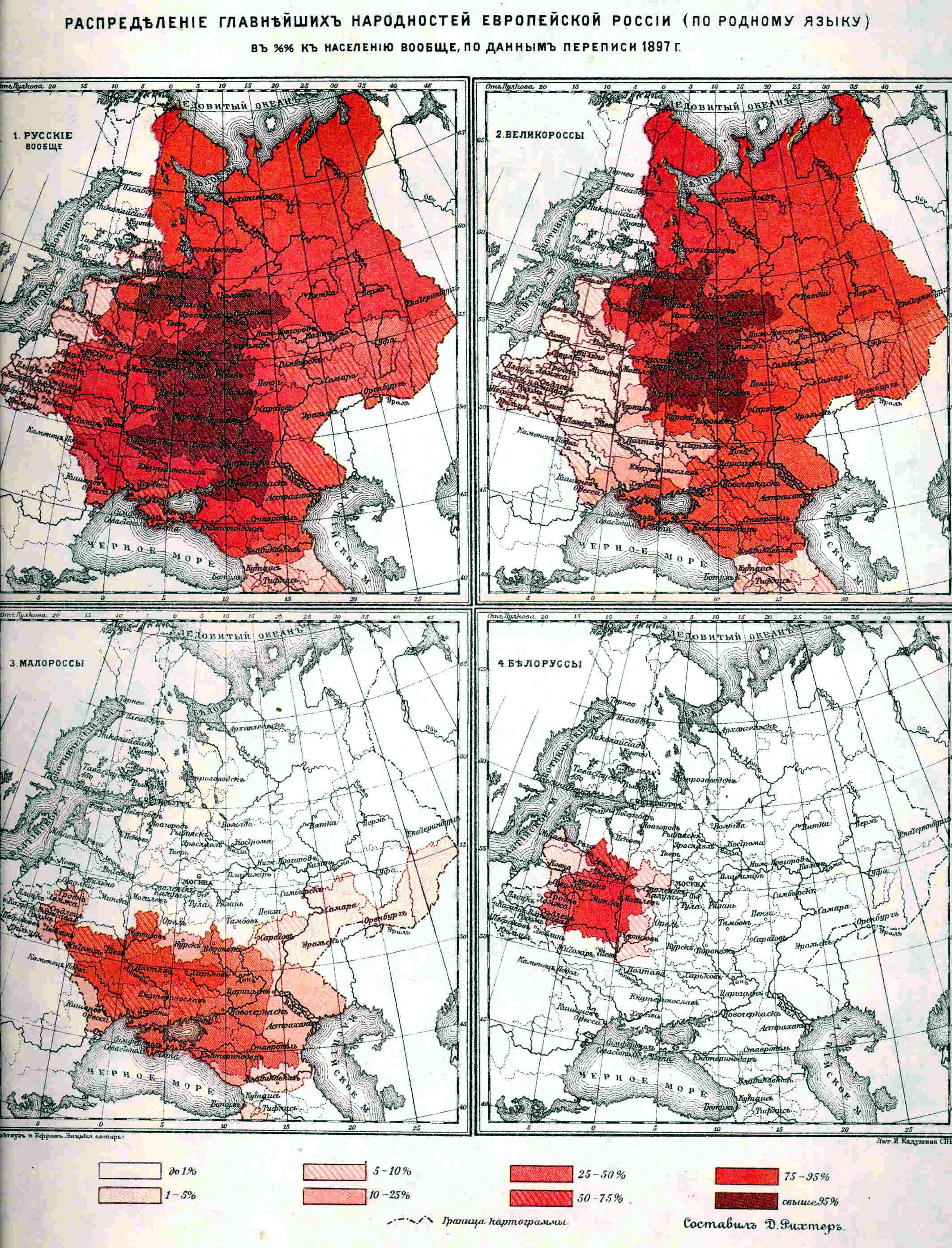
Russian Empire census of 1897 showing the "Distribution of the principal nationalities of European Russia (in the native language)" including Great Russian, Little Russian, White Russian, and Russian 'in general'

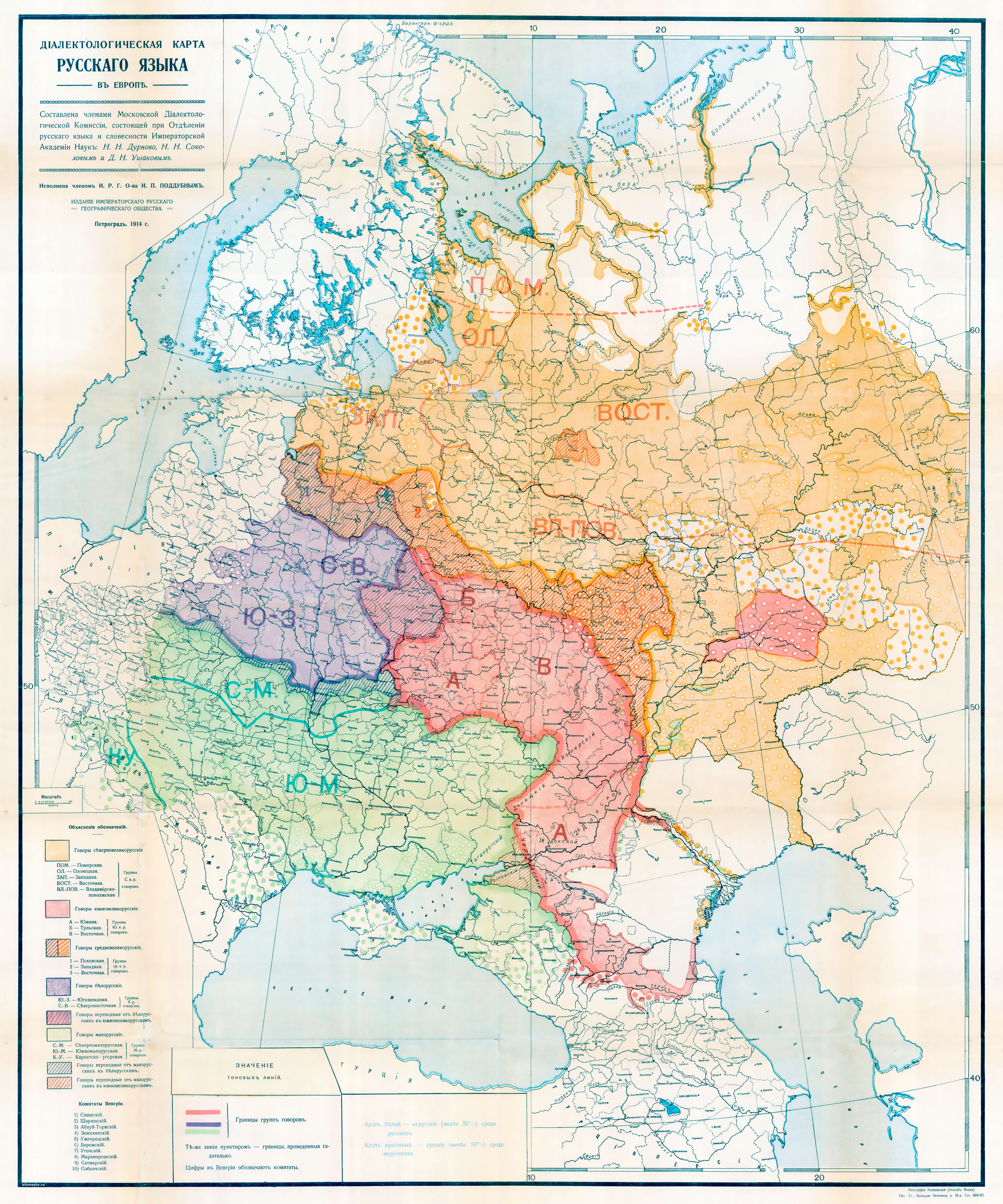
Dialect distribution areas. Pre-revolutionary dialectological map of 1914

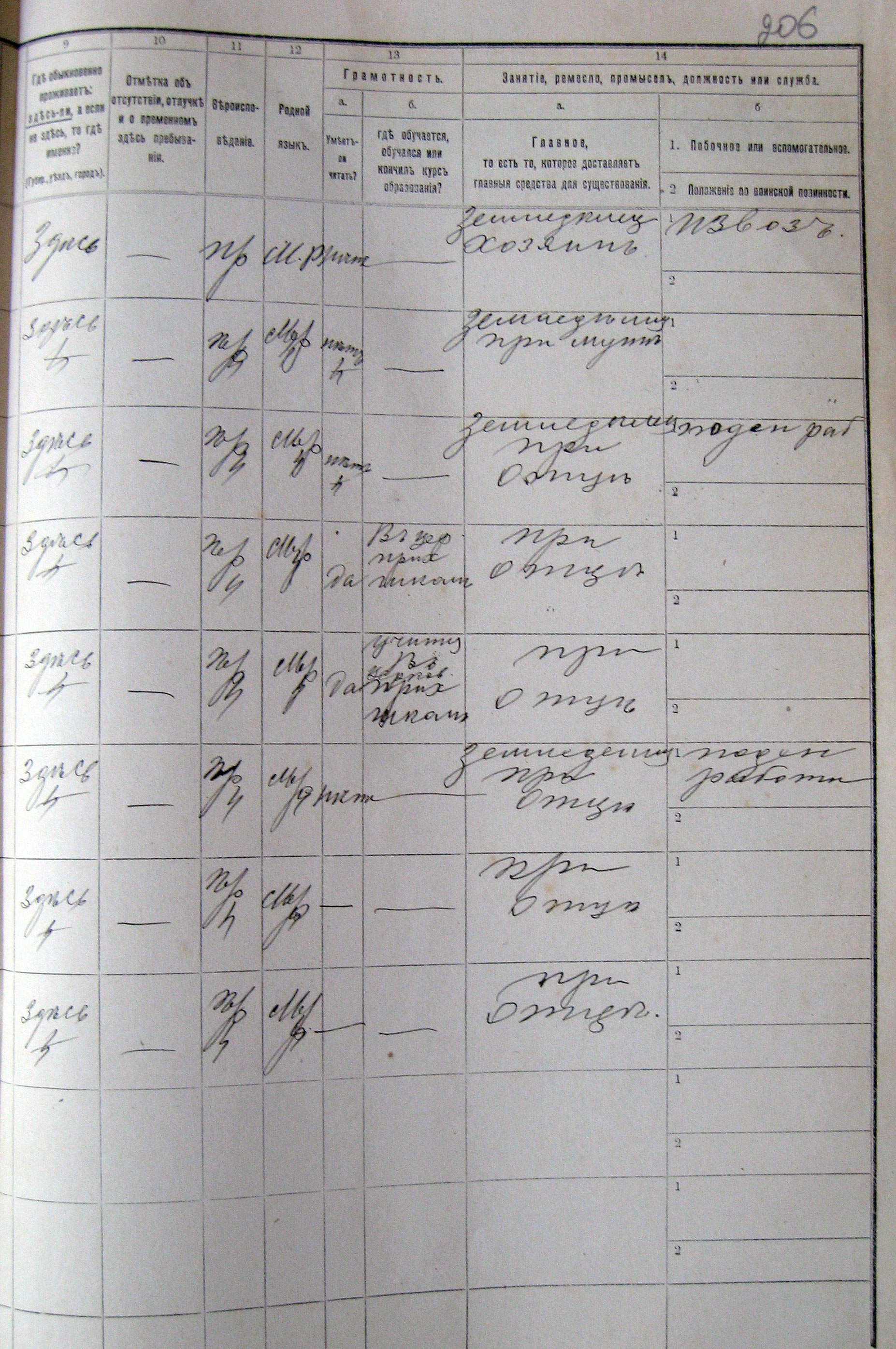
"Little Russian language" in the Russian Empire census

Although Karamzin believed that the inhabitants of what he called Great, White, and Little Russia constituted a single Russian people, by the early 19th century, linguistic and ethnographic research, together with the publication of contemporary descriptions and travel accounts, was forcing many scholars to realize that there were, indeed, considerable differences among the various components of the so-called one Russian people, in particular between the Great Russians and the Little Russians, or Ukrainians. The confirmation of such differences not only would undermine the idea of a single Russian people, but also might threaten the link between medieval Kiev and Moscow and thus render precarious the whole framework upon which the Russian imperial conception of history was built.

— Paul Robert Magocsi 2010, "Historical Perceptions", A History of Ukraine: A Land and Its Peoples, pp. 15

In the 19th century the territory of Ukraine "became an object of a terminological war"; in Russia they were referred to as the "southwestern" or "restored" lands. Some favored repressive measures to 'cleanse the Russian soul of the Western borderlands from alien Polish influences' in order to "uncover the pure Russian nature" of the population. Proponents of the triune Russian nation saw the Ukrainian and Belarusian languages to be dialects of the Russian language; this view was official and dominated popular opinion in the 19th century. In the terminological battle, Poles called Ukrainians 'Ruthenians' (Rusyny) while (Great) Russians were called 'Muscovites' (Moskali); "stressing the ethnic difference between them". In the case of Galicia, Poles insisted on Ukrainians (Ruthenians) being a branch of the Polish people. Meanwhile, in Russia, Ukrainians were also known as Ruthenians (Russiny, "always with a double-s to stress belonging to the 'All-Russian unity") or more commonly as Little Russians (Malorossy); Great Russians were known as Russkiy, a term for all East Slavs under a common nation.

During the first half of the 19th century, Ukrainianism/Little Russianism had been favored in Russian intellectual circles. Old Ruthenian and Russophile ideologists agreed that the three had recognizable cultural and linguistic differences, whereas Russophiles went a step further and argued in favor of a common self-identification of Russian and the use of one literary language. The era can be described as one of competing loyalties towards multiple identities, as opposed to mutually exclusive identities, "for many residents of Dnieper Ukraine it was perfectly normal to be both a Little Russian and Russian, or a Russian from Little Russia speaking (Ukrainian)"; Russophiles from Galicia saw themselves as "Little Russian Russians from Galicia"; many others would fall into this pluralist category, including Nikolai Gogol and nobles of Cossack origin. Conversely, those who favored a mutually exclusive Ukrainian identity over that of Little Russian did so in order to "heighten perceptual differences". "In a real sense, the evolution of the 19th century Ukrainian national reivival can be seen as the story of the conflict between a framework of multiple loyalties on the one hand and one of mutually exclusive identities on the other."

The Pre-Romantic understanding of "nation" was that of a community of nobles united by political loyalty, and more importantly excluded membership of the peasant class. Nationalisms of the Slavophiles and Pan-Slavists were influenced by the "German philosophical tradition of romanticism. Each of these movements (such as the Völkisch movement) conceived of the nation in a culturalist vein, one that glorified the authenticity of its rural life-world and its millenary fidelity to orthodoxy." By the second half of the 19th century, Russian publicists adopted, and transformed, the ideology of Pan-Slavism; "convinced of their own political superiority [they] argued that all Slavs might as well merge with the Great Russians." This ideological concept is reciprocated by Romantic-era poet, Alexander Pushkin: "Will not all the Slavic streams merge into the Russian sea?" The national project of western and southwestern Russia in the late 19th century has been defined by Alexei I. Miller as the project of the 'great Russian nation'; "supported and carried out by the government, it was meant to create one modern Russian nation out of the Great, Little, and White Russians." Compared to British Orientalism, "The Russian gentry also felt that the Ukrainian peasantry, by virtue of their Orthodox faith, related language, and history, should be included in a tripartite 'Russian' nation made up of the East Slavs". The system of 'All-Russian unity' debated on two models: the French model of national assimilation, and the British model of regional countries under a common nation and identity, with the project's advocates seeing it as a 'middle ground' between both.

Russians and Ukrainian intellectuals began to delve into understanding their own national characteristics through research into folklore, ethnography, literature, and history; resulting in a mutual conclusion that they were distinct peoples. "Ukrainians made a point, in particular, of challenging and undermining the idea of a unitary Rus nation." 19th century Ukrainian historian Mykola Kostomarov wrote of the contrast between Little and Great Russian peoples in his acclaimed essay, (Note: Dmytro Doroshenko, a leading Ukrainian historian, has referred to the essay as "Gospels of Ukrainian Nationalism".) Two Russian Nationalities, which spoke of Little and Great Russian peoples constituting "two Russian nationalities" and "two Russian languages". In his Truth about Rus' series, he stressed that Ukrainians constituted a unique people; the unity of Ukrainians and Russians was seen "as a unity of equal independent parts", and in a number of works he emphasized the federative nature of the Rus' polity. The attitude which accepted Ukrainians as 'equal independent parts' could only last as long as the Ukrainians of Little Russia "accepted their role as members of such an imagined Rus' nation", and after the 1840s a large number of Ukrainian intellectuals began to refuse the All-Russian national identity, while Ukrainian nationalists emerged and intervened in the Polish-Russian terminological battle, introducing the terms Ukraine and Ukrainians in their contemporary meaning. The All-Russian nationality being 'empire-driven' relied heavily on references to Slavic culture and the historic state of Kievan Rus', and thus required the cooperation of the people who inhabited this land. With the rise of Ukrainian and Belarusian national movements in the late 19th century, opposition came not only from the majority of Great Russians, but also numerous Little Russian intellectuals who insisted on a combined All-Russian identity. The rejection of the Ukrainian movement was directly connected to sustaining the belief of a triune Russian nation, and Ukrainian Russophiles of the mid-19th century abandoned the idea of constituting a distinct Ukrainian (Old Ruthenian) identity in favor of the triune nationality.

Following the January Uprising in 1863 the Russian government became extremely determined to eliminate all manifestations of separatism, and claims for a collective identity separate from the All-Russian identity were wholly rejected by Russian nationalists as attempts to divide the nation. Official policy began to fully endorse the notion that Ukrainian (vis-à-vis Little Russian) language and nationality did not exist. Russified inhabitants of White and Little Russia who assimilated to the triune Russian identity were not considered inorodtsy (ethnically alien) within the predominantly Great Russian locales of the Russian Empire, as their differences from proper Russians were not as easily recognized. On a personal level, individuals from White and Little Russia willing to renounce their identity and merge into the 'all-Russian' ethnos were never discriminated against on ethnic grounds, however, "systematic repression was applied to all individuals who upheld a distinct Ukrainian identity whether in the political or in the cultural sphere" and "upward mobility could only be achieved through the acquisition of Russian language and culture". The Ems Ukase of 1876 forbade the publishing of books in "the Little Russian dialect", as well as the performance of music or theater in the language; and historical sources were to be translated into Russian orthography. The education system became a primary tool of nationalizing the peasantry (which did not adopt the Little Russian identity), and the teaching of the Ukrainian language was banned by the state. This was done in order to "make favorable conditions for the triune Russian, Russophile identity".

=== 20th century ===
By the early 20th century Russian attitudes towards the separateness of the Ukrainian identity were negative. From their perspective, Ukrainians lived in Little Russia, which for them "was an inalienable part of the Russian homeland". Dmitry Likhachov, an acclaimed 20th century specialist of Kievan Rus', best summed up this attitude: "Over the course of the centuries following their division into two entities, Russia and Ukraine have formed not only a political but also a culturally dualistic unity. Russian culture is meaningless without Ukrainian, as Ukrainian is without Russian." Liberal philosopher Peter Struve was a leading champion of the all-Russian nation. Struve believed that the unity of Russian culture to be crucial for the development of the Russian empire into a modern nation state and the development of a separate Ukrainian identity would lead to narrow provincialism as opposed to the cosmopolitanism that the Russian language would provide.

Following the revolution, a majority of Russians (as well as the authorities) viewed the Ukrainian identity as a superficial invention of the west, namely Austria-Hungary and Germany, with no support from the local "Russian" population outside of a "few misguided intellectuals". In contrast to the 18th century view which defined Little Russians as members of the gentry, adherents of the triune Russian nationality now saw the peasantry not as Ukrainians, but as Little Russians. This term, however, did not gain use among the Ukrainian peasantry, and led to further repression of the Ukrainian language (a "Russian vernacular"), the Greek Catholic Church, and provoked a rise of anti-Russian sentiment among Ukrainians.

Kievan Rus' was perceived in Soviet historiography as a common cradle of Eastern Slavs, and Soviet policy codified East Slavs as historically belonging to one Russian people (Russkiy narod). This national identity was an extension of the plurality of the early 19th century, wherein a Ukrainian or Belarusian could be a Soviet and also a Russian. Historical texts commissioned by the government, under the guidance of cultural commissar Andrei Zhdanov, sought to fuse religion, ethnicity, and the state more prominently in the interpretation of history, and project a triune Russian nation as the focus of the Soviet Union. The textbooks published in 1937 reestablished the unity of the Russian state, and connected Russian history from Kievan Rus' to the Soviet Union, and presented the territorial gains from Ukraine in the 17th century as liberation and reunification.

After the dissolution of the Soviet Union and the subsequent independence of Russia, Ukraine and Belarus, the concept of either an All-Russian or Soviet people lost its ideological significance. Instead, the conceptions that deny the trinity or a kindredship between these nations have experienced rapid development, meeting the needs of nation-building. However, post-Soviet Russian nationalists continue to speak of a "triune Russian nation" (triedinaya russkaya natsiya), and the concept of a triune Russian people has persisted in different forms in the political and publicist spheres of Russia, Ukraine, and Belarus. Also, the trinity conception is regarded as a category from the past century that needs to be renewed by the search for new identities and new unifying impulses.

Early in the tenure of Boris Yeltsin, Russia preoccupied itself with recreating a national identity based either on Soviet or pre-Soviet traditions.

Ilya Prizel claimed in 1994 that

"Today few in Russia would assert Muscovy's role as the sole successor of Kievan Rus' but would argue instead that Ukraine, Belarus, and Russia are one people separated due to Tatar and Polish aggression and, thus, are equal heirs to the Kievan legacy."

=== 21st century ===
The concept is a sticking point in modern Russia–Ukraine relations. Russian diplomats as well as Russian Federation president Vladimir Putin have continued to exert the claim that Russians and Ukrainians "are one nation", "one people", and "fraternal", especially in the midst of the Yanukovich government's balk at the European Union–Ukraine Association Agreement, followed by the Euromaidan protests and the Revolution of Dignity. In 2013, Russian presidential spokesman Dmitry Peskov likewise referred to Ukraine as a "brotherly country". Such rhetoric has significantly informed Putin's justification for the Russo-Ukrainian War, including its invasion of Ukraine: on 21 February 2022, three days before the start of the invasion, Putin claimed that Ukraine "has never had its own authentic statehood," and that it is "an integral part of our own history, culture, [and] spiritual space."

During the Russian invasion of Ukraine Dmitry Medvedev, deputy chairman of the Security Council of Russia and former Russian president, publicly wrote that "Ukraine is NOT a country, but artificially collected territories" and that Ukrainian "is NOT a language" but a "mongrel dialect" of Russian. Medvedev has also said that Ukraine should not exist in any form and that Russia will continue to wage war against any independent Ukrainian state. Moreover, Medvedev claimed in July 2023 that Russia would have had to use a nuclear weapon if the 2023 Ukrainian counteroffensive was a success. According to Medvedev, the "existence of Ukraine is fatally dangerous for Ukrainians and that they will understand that life in a large common state is better than death. Their deaths and the deaths of their loved ones. And the sooner Ukrainians realize this, the better". On 22 February 2024, Medvedev described the future plans of Russia in the Russo-Ukrainian War when he claimed that the Russian Army will go further into Ukraine, taking the southern city of Odesa and may again push on to the Ukrainian capital Kyiv, and stated that "Where should we stop? I don't know". For his claims Medvedev has been described as "Russian rashist (Russian fascist)" by Ukrainian and American media.

A poll conducted in April 2022 by "Rating" found that the vast majority (91%) of Ukrainians (excluding the Russian-occupied territories of Ukraine) do not support the thesis that "Russians and Ukrainians are one people".

==== Polls ====
A nationwide poll conducted in March 2000 in Belarus found that 42.6% of the respondents said that they regard Belarusians as a branch of a triune Russian nation.

According to a survey conducted in 2015 by the Vilnius-based Independent Institute for Social, Political and Economic Research (IISEPS), exactly two thirds of Belarusians still believe that Belarusians, Russians and Ukrainians are three branches of one nation, with 27.1 per cent of respondents considering them to be different peoples.

A poll conducted in July 2021 by the Ukrainian pollster "Rating" found that 55% of Ukrainian respondents (excluding Russian-annexed Crimea and separatist-controlled territories) disagreed with Putin's recent statements that "Russians and Ukrainians are one people belonging to the same historical and spiritual space", while 41% agreed. In Eastern Ukraine, 65% agreed with the statements while 30% disagreed, in Southern Ukraine, 56% agreed while 40% disagreed, in Central Ukraine, 36% agreed while 60% disagreed, and in Western Ukraine, 22% agreed while 75% disagreed.

However, a poll conducted between July and August 2021 by a Ukrainian public policy think tank "Razumkov Center" discovered that 70% disagreed with Putin's thesis that "that there was no historical basis for the idea of a Ukrainian people separate from the Russian people and that the separation of Ukrainians and Belarusians as separate peoples was the result of Soviet national policy", while 12.5% agreed (excluding Russian-annexed Crimea and militant-controlled territories in the Donbas). When examining sub-regional groupings, one could find higher levels of support for this claim in Eastern and Southern (21.8% and 18.8%) versus Central Ukraine (11.7%), respectively. In Western Ukraine, only 0.4% of respondents agreed with the aforementioned idea. Similarly, there was a higher number of interviewees struggling to give a certain answer to Putin's claim in the East and South. But overall, the survey found majority opposition to said thesis amongst all sub-regional categories.

A poll conducted in April 2022 by "Rating" found that the vast majority (91%) of Ukrainians (excluding the Russian-occupied territories of Ukraine) do not support the thesis that “Russians and Ukrainians are one people”. The number of those who share this opinion was only 8% (in August 2021, it was 41%, in March 2022 – 21%). Support for this idea was still recorded among 23% of residents of the East and 13% of older respondents. In contrast, in other macro-regions and age groups, there was almost no support for this thesis.

==== Religion ====
The title "Of all Rus'", always used by Russian rulers, is still in use by the Orthodox patriarchs in both Russia and Ukraine. In this case the Russian patriarch uses the title "Patriarch of Moscow and all Rus'", while the Ukrainian patriarch of the Ukrainian Orthodox Church – Kyiv Patriarchate used the title "Patriarch of Kyiv and all Rus'", implying competing claims on spiritual leadership of the Orthodox people on all the territory of former Kievan Rus'.

An initiative of both Kremlin foreign policy and the Russian Orthodox Church is the concept of the "Russian world" (русский мир), seen as the "reunification" of the triune Russian people, and sometimes as the main task for the 21st century. This initiative has been promoted in conjunction with the Russian government in its foreign policy in order to consolidate its position in the post-Soviet area, as it puts Moscow "at the center of an Orthodox civilization of kindred neighbors: Russia, Belarus, and Ukraine".

== Status of the Rusyns ==
The all-Russian ideology tended to include the speakers of the fourth and only other East Slavic language, the Rusyns of Carpathian Ruthenia, as part of the Little Russians (Ukrainians). Some contemporary Rusyn authors in the United States preferred to consider the Rusyns as a subgroup of their own within the larger Russian nation. Still, the fact that the Rusyns were most closely related to the Little Russians was never denied among the Rusyns. Rusyn followers of the all-Russian concept were known as "Russophiles".

== See also ==
- Russian world
- On the historical unity of Russians and Ukrainians
- Galician Russophilia
- Gente Ruthenus, natione Polonus
- Great Russian chauvinism
- Little Russian identity
- Orthodoxy, Autocracy, and Nationality
- Pan-Slavism
- Prometheism
- Rashism
- Russian irredentism
- Russian nationalism
- Russification
- Russophilia
- Ukraine § Etymology and orthography
- Union State
- White movement
- Z (military symbol)
