= Little Russian identity =

Historic identity among some Ukrainians in the Russian Empire

The Little Russian identity was a cultural, political, and ethnic self-identification of a population of Ukraine under the Russian rule, who aligned themselves as one of the constituent parts of the triune Russian nationality. (Note: Although historian Andrew Wilson has described the Little Russian identity as "a strong proto-Ukrainian identity of people who did consider themselves a separate people in service of the Tsardom of Russia". And Paul Robert Magocsi has argued that the Russification of Ukraine did not lead to assimilation but to the acquisition of multiple identities.) The Little Russian identity combined the cultures of Imperial Russia and Cossack Hetmanate. The beginning of the development of the Little Russian identity in the Cossack Hetmanate dates back to the mid 18th century.

The name "Little Russians" was promoted instead of the previous ethnonym "Ruthenians" (русини, rusyny). The struggle between two projects of national identity, "Little-Russiansim" (Ukrainian: Малоросійство) and "Ukrainian-ness" lasted until the dissolution of the Russian Empire. The revolutionary events of 1917 led to a rapid strengthening of the Ukrainian national idea, which was backed by many Western Ukrainians from formerly Austrian-ruled Galicia who joined the political life in Kiev. Because of their adjacency to the Russian White Movement, political activists with Little Russian and Pan-Russian views were among the social groups who suffered the most during the Revolution and the troubles of the Civil War, with many of them being killed or forced to emigrate.

After the end of the Civil War, the process of Ukrainian nation-building was resumed in the territory of Ukrainian SSR by the Bolshevik party and the Soviet authorities, who introduced the policy of korenizatsiya, the implementation of which in the Ukrainian SSR was called Ukrainization. As a result, the term "Little Russian" was marginalized and remained in usage only among White emigres.

== Emergence ==
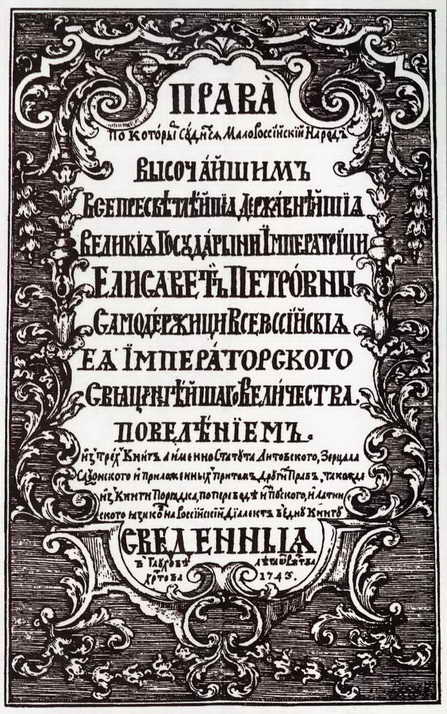
A 1794 publication of Laws, according to which Little Russian people litigate (1794) approved by Empress Elizabeth

The Little Russian political ideology emerged simultaneous to the revival of the Byzantine term Little Rus' at the end of the 16th century in the literary works of the Orthodox Christian clergy of the Polish–Lithuanian Commonwealth. Numerous prominent Orthodox authors and hierarchs, such as Ivan Vyshenskyi, Zakharia Kopystenskyi, Yelisey Pletenetskyi or Job Boretsky strongly opposed the Union of Brest and polemicized with Roman Catholics and Uniates, developing the ideas of a pan-Russian Orthodox people. The Little Russian idea steadily gained support among Cossack leadership and Orthodox brotherhoods, which were subject to judicial, economic and religious discrimination; and repeatedly organized violent uprisings against Polish rule from the end of the 16th to the first half of the 17th century. Simultaneously, the image of an Orthodox Tsar who would protect the All-Russian people against the injustice of the Poles became a political tool used by Moscovite rulers. Later, the existence of such sentiments facilitated the signing of the Treaty of Pereyaslav during the Khmelnytsky Uprising as well as the political integration of the Hetmanate into the Tsardom of Russia.

After the Pereyaslav Treaty the Hetmanate faced a civil war known as The Ruin between pro-Russian and pro-Polish forces. After the pro-Polish fraction lost Left-bank Ukraine, the Little Russian identity ultimately consolidated after already being strongly enrooted in ecclesiastic circles. An important milestone was the 1674 publication of the Kievan Synopsis by the archimandrite of the Kiev Pechersk Lavra and the rector of the Kievan Theological School Innocent Gizel. In his work he described the dynastic succession between Kiev and Moscow as well as the existence of an All-Russian nation which has its origins in the ancient people of the Kievan Rus. Throughout the 18th century Synopsis was the most widespread and popular historical work in Russia.

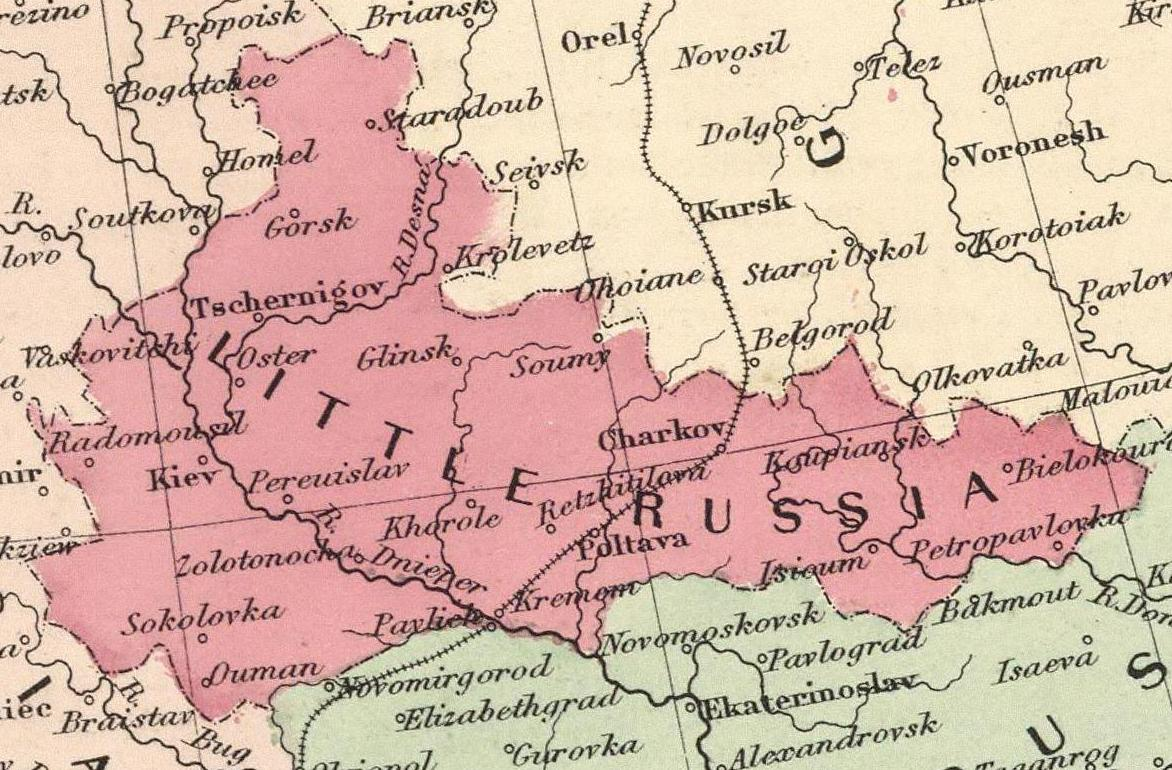
Little Russia on a 19th-century map of the Russian Empire

Under the influence of the Kiev-born archbishop of the Russian Orthodox Church Theophan Prokopovich the Russian Empire gradually became the object of primary identification of Little Russians while Little Russia was considered as the local homeland which composes the Empire on the equal basis with former Muscovy. The Cossack elite under Russian rule looked for ways to legitimize its social status in the hierarchy of the Russian Empire to benefit from the perspective of attractive career possibilities. Supporters of the Little Russian identity considered the Russian Empire as their own state which they built together with (Great) Russians. In the 18th century many Little Russians held important political positions of the Empire: Chancellor Alexander Bezborodko, minister of education Pyotr Zavadovsky, general prosecutor Dmitry Troshchinsky, Field Marshal and President of the Academy of Science Kyrylo Rozumovskyi, Field Marshal Alexey Razumovsky among others.

The Little Russian identity didn't aim at blurring local peculiarities as long as they didn't contradict the most important thing: the idea of a cultural and political All-Russian unity. Little Russians had not the opinion that they are "sacrificing" the interests of their local homeland to the Great Russians or that they have to abandon their identity in favour of the Great Russian.

The Little Russian identity was not the only form of self-identification that existed in Ukraine prior to the emergence of the Ukrainian national identity. The supporters of hetman Ivan Mazepa who rebelled against Russian emperor Peter I favored a Khazarian origin to the Cossack people, which they considered a distinct nation. It told that the "Cossack people" originates from the old Khazars unrelated to Russians. This version is also described in the Orlyk Constitution.

== Rivalry with the Ukrainian idea ==
=== Russian Empire ===
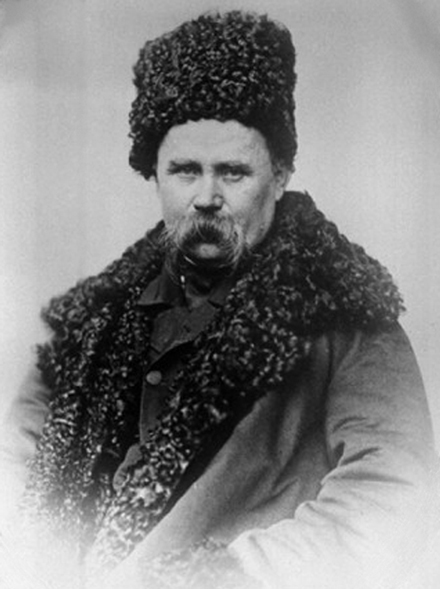
Taras Shevchenko ended up of having the greatest influence on the Ukrainian national movement. He is Ukraine's national hero.

In the second half of the 19th century an alternative identity project emerged which was called Ukrainianness (українство). The naming referred to the territory of Ukraine which in the earlier times designated the border region south of Kiev inhabited by Cossacks. The characteristical traits of the new political ideology was the growing rejection of any cultural and ethnic ties with Russia. The basis of Ukrainianness was laid by members of the Brotherhood of Saints Cyril and Methodius, led by Mykola Kostomarov.

Brian J. Boeck says "The ethnonym maloros (Little Russian) was the self-designation of choice among educated Ukrainians in the Russian Empire until the early twentieth century. It began to acquire pejorative connotations in the late nineteenth century when young, nationally conscious Ukrainians started to hold the older generation in contempt for being too conciliatory, too bicultural, and too Russian. Before then, it was neutral, if not frequently positive: the Kyiv University historian and ethnographer Mykhailo Maksymovych welcomed the fact that he had been called a "true Little Russian." Osip Bodyansky, one of the founding fathers of Ukrainian philology, identified himself in 1836 as a Little Russian (malorossiianin) in his private correspondence with the great Slavist Pavel Jozef Šafárik. The historian Mykola Kostomarov, who played a leading role in the Ukrainian national revival for most of his life, at certain points in his career even rejected the name Ukraine as anachronistic."

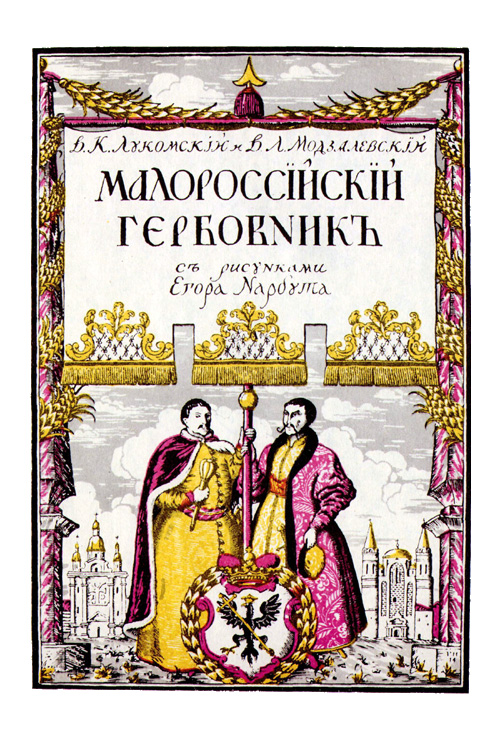
The 1914 Armorial of Little Russia, illustrated by Heorhiy Narbut

Particularly on the territory of Galicia, which belonged to Austria-Hungary, Ukrainianness experienced a rapid development in the 1800s, with the support of local and national authorities. The rivalry between the Little Russian and the Ukrainian identity which intensified in the period prior to World War I had the character of a local Kulturkampf and terminological war. The rhetorical battle was led for the cultural heritage of Little Russia and the identity of many key figures such as Taras Shevchenko. Hot polemics inflamed about historical issues, personalities and the interpretation of Little Russia's history. One of the most influential supporters of Ukrainianness was Mykhailo Hrushevskyi, the author of the large historical monograph, the "History of Ukraine-Rus". His work emphasized that Ukrainians and Russians had a separate ethnogenesis.

Also in the linguistic question the "Little Russians" and the "Ukrainians" had strong differences. While the first ones considered the literary Russian language as a common creation and spiritual value of all three Russian branches and spoke of a Little Russian dialect, the last ones promoted the views that Ukrainian is an autonomous language and made big efforts to standardize it as soon as possible.

Brian J. Boeck says "The separation of Ukraine and Little Russia became virtually complete by 1920; and the word maloros, previously used by serious scholars and sincere patriots, became forever tainted because of its appropriation by Russian nationalist extremists. From then onwards, the name Ukraine represented the nation's future, while Little Russia became relegated to the imperial(ist) past."

=== Soviet Union ===
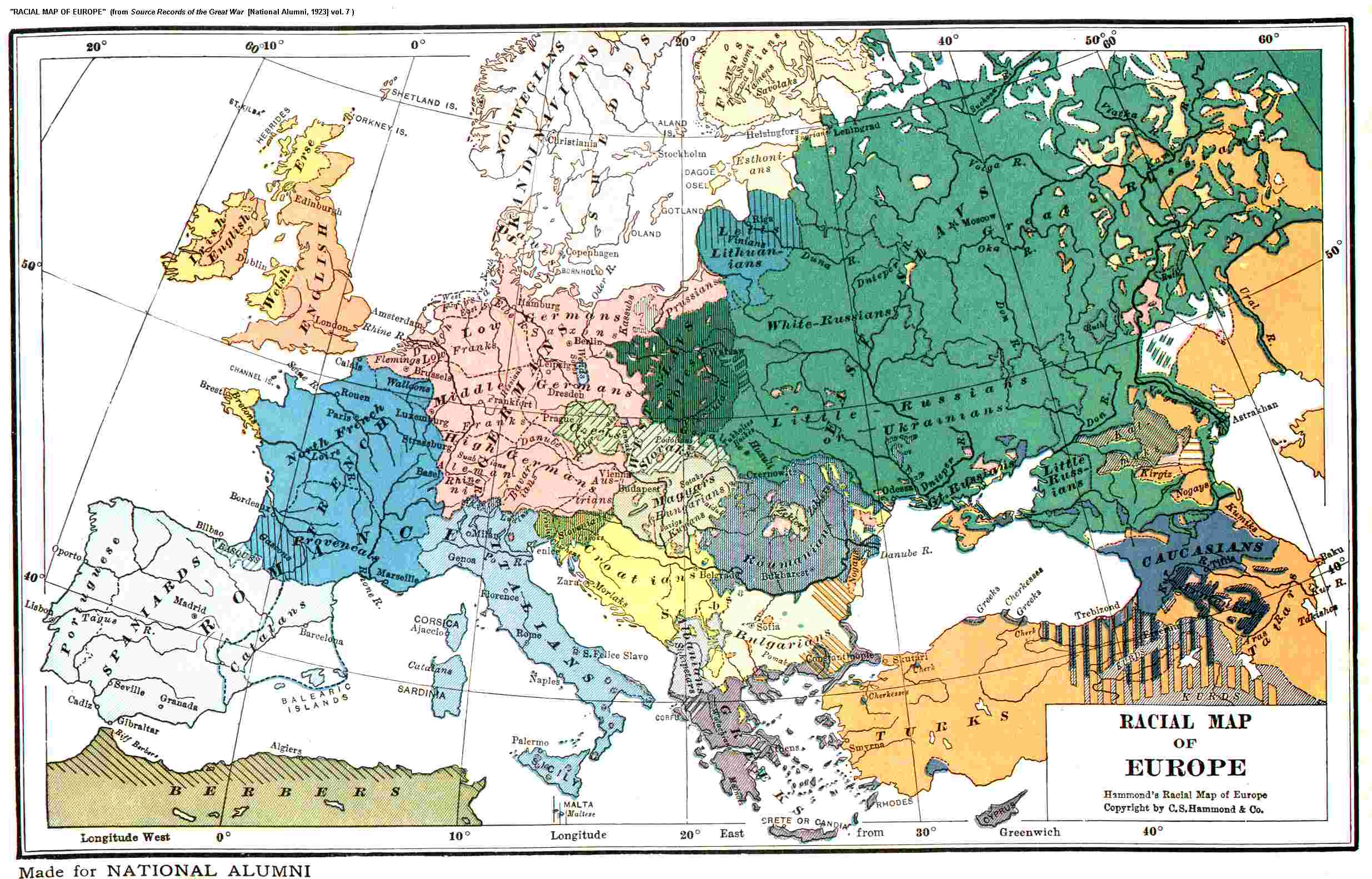
A British ethnic map of Europe (1923)

The Little Russian identity remained dominant among elites even in the revolutionary years of 1917–1921. However, with the beginning of the Bolshevik policy of Ukrainization, which was the local form of the nationwide communist Korenizatsiya or "nativization" policy, the Little Russian identity was declared 'antiquated and illegitimate'. In the 1920s Bolshevik internationalists used the Ukrainian SSR and the Byelorussian SSR as "exhibition pavillons" of their nationality policy, hoping to gain sympathies of the disadvantaged East Slavic population in interwar Poland. At the same time they hoped to ultimately weaken pan-Russian imperialism in a society that was represented by their adversary in the Russian Civil War: the Imperial Russian White Movement. The Bolsheviks had the largest credit in the realization and consolidation of the Ukrainian identity project. In the First All-Union Census of the Soviet Union (1926) the registration of people as Little Russians was restricted, and people in the Ukrainian SSR had to choose between the Ukrainian and Russian nationality or even were automatically registered as Ukrainians. The term 'Little Russian' remained in usage only among some White emigres.

Although the antiquated Little Russian identity gave way to the new ethnonym Ukrainian, and the conception of an All-Russian people was replaced by a new Soviet or Bolshevik conception of brotherly but separate peoples, certain elements of the Little Russian identity persisted. The Ukrainian nation was regarded as "brotherly" to the Russian, and the striving towards political unification with the Russians was described in Soviet history books as the leitmotif of Ukrainian history. In the described way the Soviet ideology combined elements of Ukrainian and Little Russian identities.

=== Present times ===
In the period of glasnost and perestroika in the late 1980s, as well as after Ukraine declared its independence in 1991, Little Russian elements came under increased pressure. Representatives in the Ukrainian diaspora in Canada, the United States and western Europe got an opportunity to exert influence on societal processes in Ukraine.

In his 2011 interview Ukraine's then education minister Dmytro Tabachnyk claimed, that he considered name "Little Russia" to have a positive meaning, denoting Ukraine's special place in the "Russian world" as the cradle of the original Rus' state.

According to a report by Izvestia, in 2014 Russian State Duma member Mikhail Degtyarev directed a proposal to the Vinogradov Institute of Russian Language to study the possibility of using the term "Little Russia" (Малороссия) in respect to Ukraine in official Russian documents.

In 2017 Alexander Zakharchenko, the leader of separatist Donetsk People's Republic, recognized in Ukraine as a terrorist organization, declared the creation of the state of "Little Russia" on the territory of his entity and the nearby self-proclaimed Luhansk People's Republic, claiming that the name "Ukraine" had "discredited itself". Russian authorities voiced their sympathy with the declaration, but refused to openly support it.

In 2018 Patriarch Cyril of Moscow positively evaluated the historical use of the name "Little Russia" in respect to Ukraine during a meeting with Ukrainian historian and archaeologist Petro Tolochko.

== Reception ==
Ukrainian author Mykola Riabchuk views the Little Russian identity as a sociological complex of reduced patriotism among some parts of Ukrainian society, resulting from Ukrainian areas being part of the Russian Empire for a long time. At the same time, according to Riabchuk, Little Russian identity played a key role in the emergence of modern Ukrainian identity, because although its followers saw Ukraine as a complimentary part of a common entity with Great Russia, they simultaneously internalized the Cossack and szlachta ideas of rights and liberties, which were alien to Muscovite culture. Supporters of Little Russian identity saw Little Russia as equal to Great Russia, not a subordinate part of the latter. Even after Ukraine had been reduced to a mere Russian province, its distinct local identity didn't disappear, but gradually evolved into the Ukrainian one. The recognition of the impossibility to combine both a Ukrainian and an imperial Russian identity was demonstrated by the Third Universal of the Ukrainian Central Council.

However, even after Ukraine's independence in 1991, the influence of Little Russian identity could be observed in the defeat of national-oriented candidacy of Viacheslav Chornovil and the election of Leonid Kravchuk as the country's president. As a result, the now independent country preserved most of its institutions from the Soviet era, and the new political and business elites formed as a creole group, spreading their influence over the majority of Ukraine's population. In Riabchuk's opinion, in independent Ukraine Little Russian identity has evolved from a regional phenomenon into a countrywide force, and has a potential to challenge the national project by proposing an alternative based on the Russian language and culture, but politically separated from Russia itself. The legacy of Little Russian identity could be seen in the results of polls organized by Razumkov Centre between 2006 and 2016, according to which inhabitants of the majority of Ukraine's regions on average felt themselves culturally closer to people in Russia and Belarus, than to fellow Ukrainians in Galicia. Such attitudes cannot be explained exclusively by the influence of Soviet-era propaganda, and have likely emerged under the influence of Orthodox tradition.

== See also ==
- Western Ukrainian Russophiles
- All-Russian nation
- Gente Ruthenus, natione Polonus
- Nashism
- National Bolshevism
- Neo-Sovietism
- Neo-Stalinism
- Novorossiya
- Pochvennichestvo
- Russia–European Union relations
- Russia–Ukraine relations
- Russophilia
- Rusyns
- Black Ruthenia
- Red Ruthenia
- White Ruthenia
- West Russianism
- Little Russia
- Great Russia
- New Russia
- Moscow, third Rome
- Russian World

== Literature ==
- Kohut Z. The Development of a Little Russian Identity and Ukrainian Nationbuilding // Harvard Ukrainian Studies. — 1986. — 10. — H. 3/4. — P. 556–576.
- Мацузато К. Ядро или периферия империи? Генерал-губернаторство и малороссийская идентичность // Ab Imperio. — 2002. — No. 2.
