= Great Russian chauvinism =

Ideology

Great Russian chauvinism (Russian: великорусский шовинизм, romanized: velikorussky shovinizm) is a term defined by the early Soviet government officials, most notably Vladimir Lenin, to describe an ideology of the "dominant exploiting classes of the nation, holding a dominant (sovereign) position in the state, declaring their nation as the "superior nation". In the 1920s, Lenin promoted the policy of Korenizatsiia, for the Bolshevik party to defend the rights of oppressed nations within the former Russian Empire to self-determination, equality, and minority language rights.

== Definition ==
In Bolshevik usage, "Great‑Russian chauvinism" is treated as a specific manifestation of the broader phenomena of great‑power chauvinism, or chauvinism in general. The Great Soviet Encyclopedia (GSE) defines great‑power chauvinism as the ideology of the "dominant exploiting classes of the nation that holds a dominant (sovereign) position in the state, declaring their nation the 'superior' nation". It characterises chauvinism as an extreme form of nationalism, and recognises that this great‑national chauvinism was present not only in the Russian Empire but also in a number of other countries across the world.

The adjective "Great" in this context derives from the triune nation concept that prevailed during the imperial era. Under that conception, modern Russians were termed "Great Russians", Ukrainians and Rusyns were known as "Little Russians", and Belarusians were called "White Russians", a nomenclature that echoed the traditional historical and geographical divisions of the country's heartland (compare Greater and Lesser Poland).

== Usage ==
Following the October Revolution, in September, 1922 Lenin wrote a letter to the Politburo stating, "we consider ourselves, the Ukrainian SSR, and others equal and enter with them on an equal basis into a new union, a new federation, the Union of the Soviet Republics of Europe and Asia". Lenin also promoted an idea for the Bolshevik party to defend the right of oppressed nations within the former Russian Empire to self-determination and equality as well as the language-rights movement of the newly formed republics.

Moreover, in December 1922 Lenin in his letter "What practical measures must be taken in the present situation?" wrote, "...Thirdly, exemplary punishment must be inflicted on Comrade Ordzhonikidze (I say this all the more regretfully as I am one of his personal friends and have worked with him abroad) and the investigation of all the material which Dzerzhinsky's commission has collected must be completed or started over again to correct the enormous mass of wrongs and biased judgments which it doubtlessly contains. The political responsibility for all this truly Great-Russian nationalist campaign must, of course, be laid on Stalin and Dzerzhinsky."

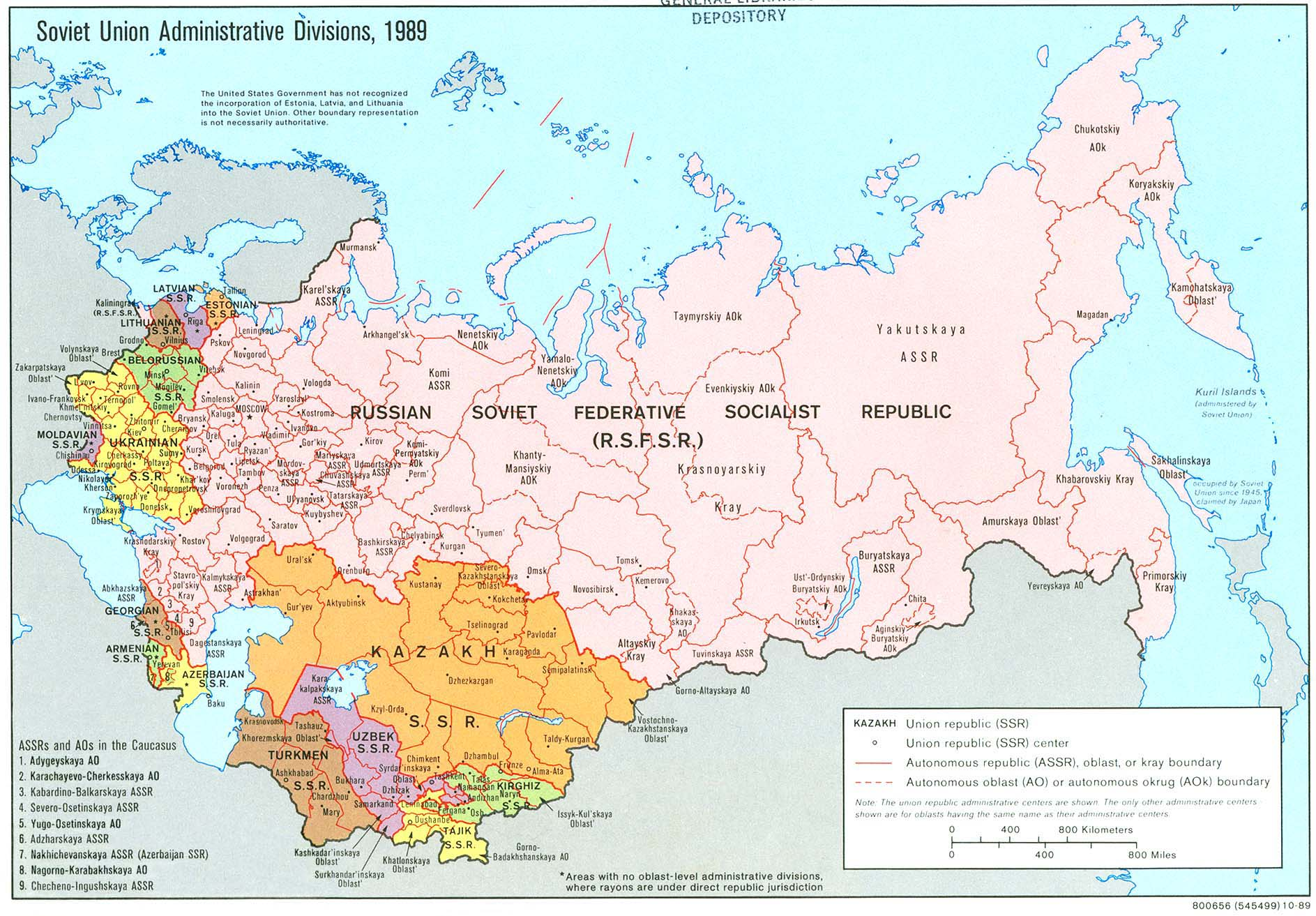
Republics of the Soviet Union in 1954–1991

At the 12th Congress of the RCP(b) Nikolay Bukharin stated: “We, [ethnic Russians] as a former great-power nation, must put ourselves in an unequal position. Only with such a policy, when we artificially put ourselves in a position lower than others, only at this price can we buy the trust of formerly oppressed nations."

In all of Stalin's speeches on the national question at party congresses (from the 10th to the 16th), the Great Russian chauvinism was declared the main danger to the Soviet state. But over time, yielding to the requirements of the newly created super-centralized structures of the Union government, the thesis was forgotten and the indigenous languages were relegated to the background, while Russian became the single language of office.

== See also ==
- All-Russian nation
- Antisemitism in the Soviet Union
- Special settlements in the Soviet Union
- Han chauvinism
- Gulag
- Katorga
- Penal transportation
- Russian imperialism
- National delimitation in the Soviet Union
- Bourgeois nationalism
- Soviet patriotism
- Population transfer in the Soviet Union
