= Mikhail Koyalovich =

Russian historian and journalist

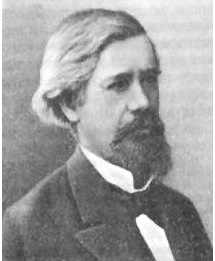
Mikhail Koyalovich

Mikhail Koyalovich (Russian: Михаи́л О́сипович Кояло́вич, 2 October 1828, Kuźnica, Grodno Governorate – 4 September 1891) was a Russian historian, political journalist and publisher of the Belarusian descent. Representative of the “West Russian” historical school.

He studied at St. Petersburg Theological Academy, where he held the first chair of comparative theology and Russian division, then chair of Russian history of the civil and ecclesiastical, after the separation of the subject into two independent departments - civil Russian history. In 1859, published the first volume of his master's thesis: "The Lithuanian church union" in 1862. - The second volume of. In "Day" IS. Aksakov put his lectures on the western Russian fraternities and the history of western Russia (the latest edition 1884, with the application of ethnographic maps).

In 1865, on behalf of the Archaeological Commission, they issued Documents, with translation into French; in 1869, on behalf of the Academy of Sciences - "Chronicle of the siege of Pskov by Stefan Batory", on behalf of the Archaeological Commission - "Diary of the Diet of Lublin in 1569", with translation into Russian, in 1872. - "The Russian Historical Library", t. I, in 1873,. - Doctoral thesis: "The history of reunification from western Uniates old days" (before 1800), in 1880, - Brochure: "Three raising of the Russian national spirit for the salvation of the Russian state in troubled times".

In 1884, published a part of the course Koyalovich on Russian history: "History of Russian national consciousness to the historical monuments and scientific writings". According to Koyalovich, "in the history of the area of objective truth is very low, the rest inevitably subjective "and he followed so that subjectivism, which is more than all others "embraces the factual part of Russian history and the best illuminates the real and significant part of its". This Russian subjectivism Koyalovich found in the writings of Slavophiles. The same trends held Slavophile Koyalovich in their journal articles (mostly on the history of South-West of Russia), and in the speeches, of which is allocated a speech delivered at the St. Petersburg Slavic Benevolent Society speech on the topic: "The historical persistence of the Russian people and its cultural characteristics" (1883). He stood there for probably close communication between the Slavic tribes, to unite them under the banner of Saints Cyril and Methodius.

Full list of works Koyalovich cm. Article Professor Palm (Slavic Izvestiya, 1891, December).
