= Great Russia =

Historic and geographic term for Russia proper

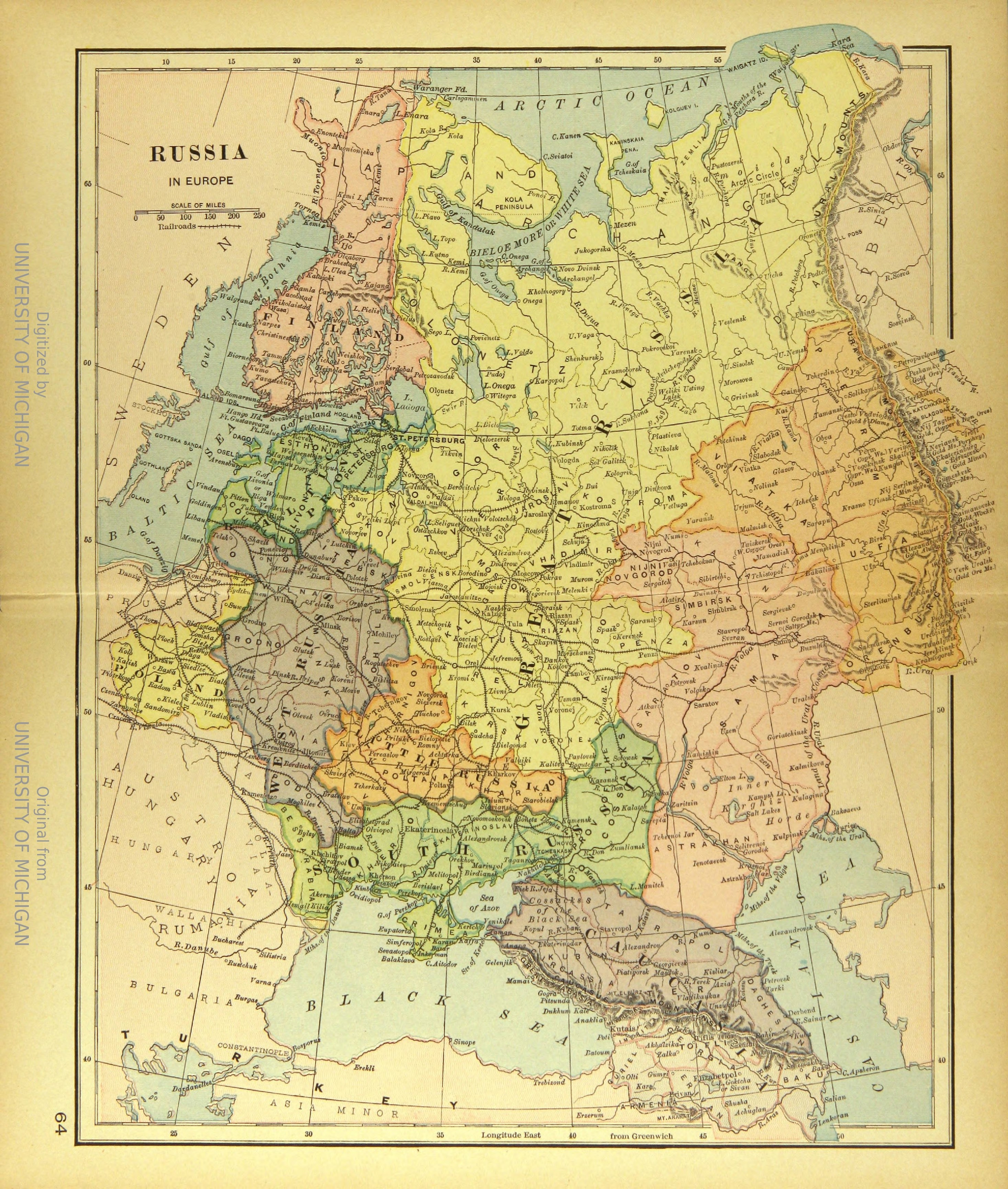
Map of the Russian Empire from The Universal Atlas (1894). Great Russia marked in yellow.

Great Russia, sometimes Great Rus' (Russian: Великая Русь [vʲɪˈlʲikəjə rusʲ], Velikaya Rus'; Великая Россия, Velikaya Rossiya; Великороссия [vʲɪlʲɪkɐˈrosʲːɪjə], Velikorossiya), is a name formerly applied to the territories of "Russia proper", the land that formed the core of the Grand Duchy of Moscow and later the Tsardom of Russia. This was the land to which the ethnic Russians were native and where the ethnogenesis of (Great) Russians took place. The name is said to have come from the Greek Μεγάλη Ῥωσσία or Ῥωσία (Megálē Rhōssía or Rhōsía).

From 1654 to 1721, Russian Tsars adopted the word – their official title included the wording (literal translation): "The Sovereign of all Rus': the Great, the Little, and the White".

The term is mentioned in the opening lines of the State Anthem of the Union of Soviet Socialist Republics: "Unbreakable Union of freeborn Republics Great Russia has welded forever to stand!" (or lit. "An unbreakable union of free republics, Great Russia has sealed forever").

Similarly, the terms Great Russian language (Великорусский язык, Velikorusskiy yazyk) and Great Russians (Великороссы, Velikorossy) were employed by ethnographers and linguists in the 19th century, but have since fallen out of use.

The area, together with the Volga-Ural region, North Caucasus and Siberia, became the Russian SFSR, while Little Russia and White Russia became the Ukrainian SSR and the Byelorussian SSR respectively.

== See also ==
- European Russia
- All-Russian nation
- Names of Rus', Russia and Ruthenia
- Greater Poland
- Novorossiya (New Russia)
- White Russia
