= Kievan Synopsis =

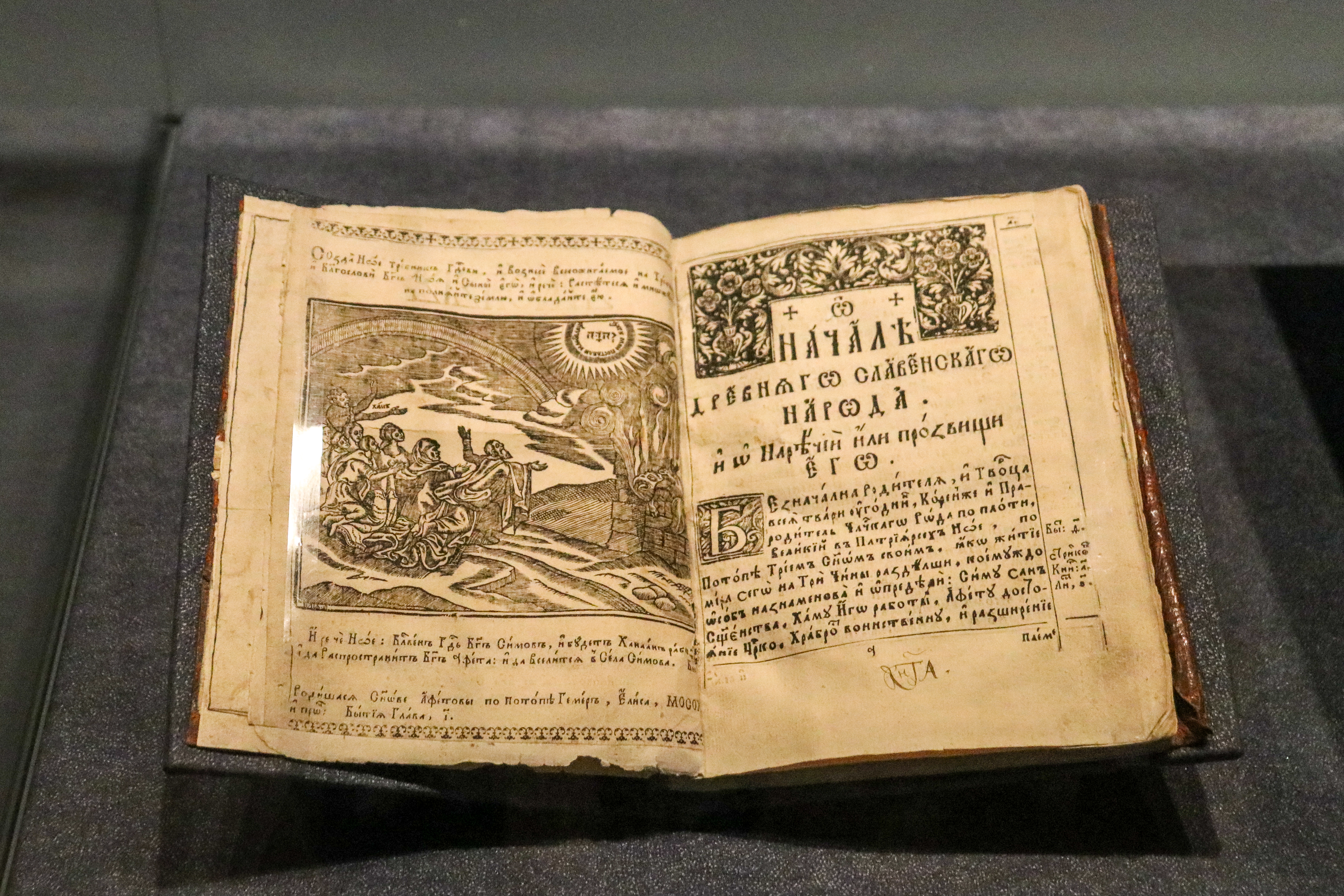
Copy of the Synopsis of 1674 on display

Text of the Synopsis (click for full PDF)

The Synopsis, or a Short Collection (Church Slavonic: Cинопсис, или Краткое собрание от различных летописцев о начале славянороссійского народа и первоначалных князех Богоспасаемого града Кіева), also known as the Kievan Synopsis or Kyivan Synopsis, is a Moscow-centric work of history, first published in Kiev (Kyiv) in 1674. Written in a language close to Church Slavonic, it interprets history through a Christian conception of time focused on the narratives of creation, fall, and redemption. It also has a political purpose to justify the Treaty of Pereyaslav, which annexed the Cossack Hetmanate to the Tsardom of Russia, while also claiming a central role for the city of Kiev.

== Authorship ==
Innokentiy Gizel is generally considered to be the author of the Synopsis, although this view is contested. Other possible authors, such as Kyiv Pechersk Lavra typograph Ioan Armashenko or the monastery's Petro Kokhanovsky are proposed by some historians.

== Content ==
The full name of the book presents the author's aim to describe the history of Kyiv from the times of "autocrat Vladimir" to the era of tsar Alexis of Russia, who is declared to be Vladimir's heir. The book began with the history of the origins and lifestyle of the Slavs and ended with the mid-17th century in the first edition. The second and third editions (1678 and 1680) end with the Chyhyryn Campaigns of 1677-1678. Synopsis covers the history of Kievan Rus', the Mongol invasion of Kievan Rus', and the struggles against the Crimean Tatars, Ottoman Turkey, and Poland.

The author of the Synopsis asserted that the Russian tsars were the legal successors of the Grand Princes of Kiev. Synopsis is notable since it ignores the tradition to depict Halych as an heir of Kyiv, which had been common in Ukrainian lands during the preceding era. Instead it depicts Moscow as the main centre of resistance against Tatar rule and supports the idea of Moscow Patriarchate providing the tsardom's legitimacy as "Third Rome". The wars fought over Kyiv during the second half of the 17th century are shown by the author as attempts to return the city under the rule of the tsar, who is claimed to be its legitimate sovereign as the successor of Kyivan princes. In this context the whole territory of "Great", "Little" and White Rus" is defined as the indivisible dynastic heritage of Moscow's rulers. The "Russian peoples" (Ukrainians and Russians) are claimed by the author to form a single political body. The work omits all mention of Bohdan Khmelnytsky and members of Cossack starshyna in this process of "reunification". The purpose of the work is to "achieve a precarious balance between glorifying the Muscovite tsar on the one hand and defending Kiev’s own claims to power on the other." The appendix of the Synopsis contains lists of Russian princes, Polish Voivodes in Ukraine, Cossack hetmans, and Kievan metropolitans.

== Legacy ==
The Synopsis was greatly popularized at the Kyiv Mohyla Academy and contributed to the emergence of several poetic and artistic works. Historian Serhii Plokhy called the Synopsis "the first “textbook” of “Russian history”. It quickly became the most popular and widely used textbook in Ukraine and Muscovy. It survived in some thirty editions until the late 18th century.
