= Alexei I. Miller =

Russian historian

Aleksey I. Miller
- Алексей Ильич Миллер
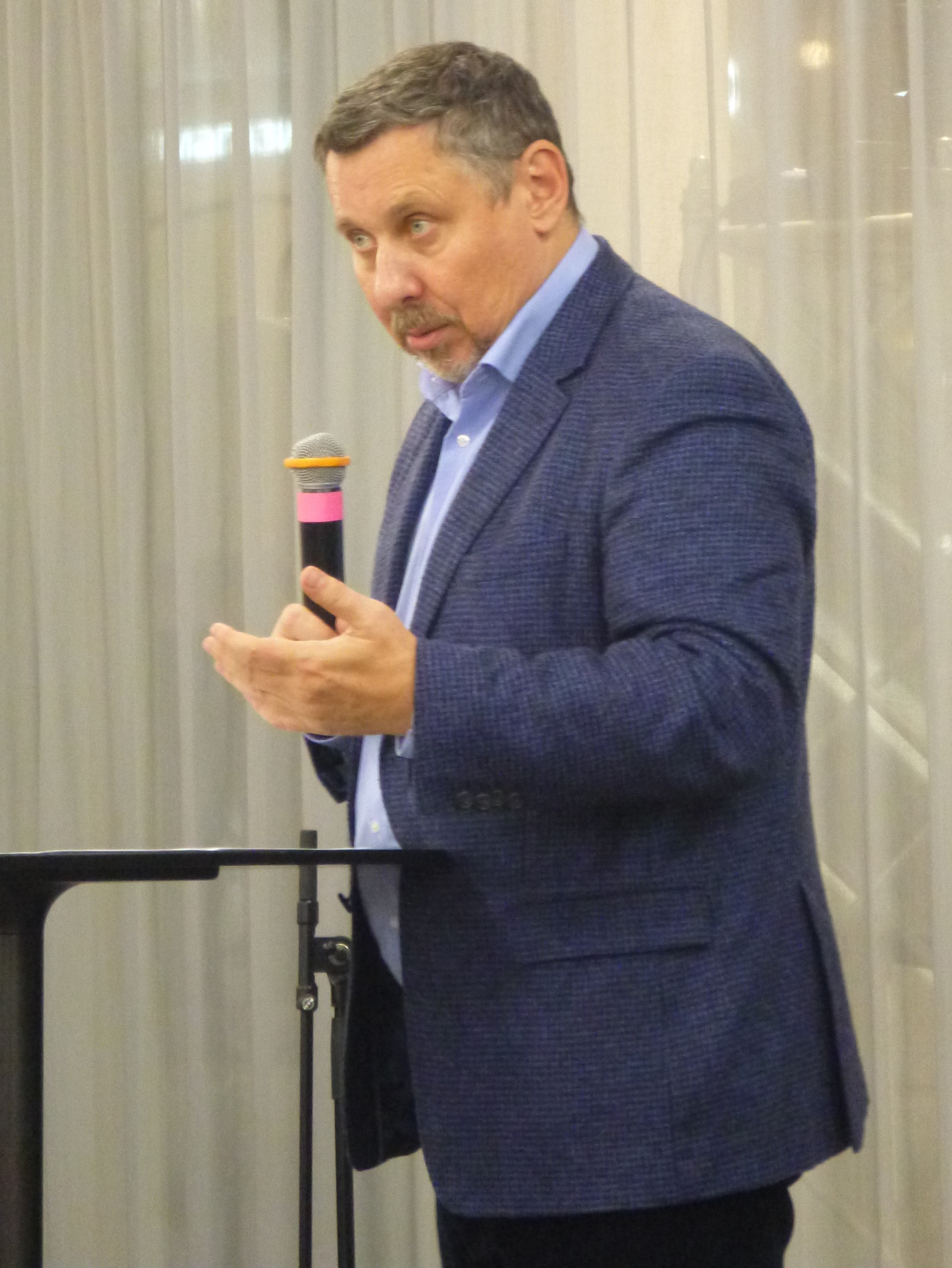
- Born: Aleksey Ilyich Miller; 4 September 1959 (age 66); Moscow, Soviet Union
- Occupation: Historian
- Alexei I. Miller's voice Miller on the Echo of Moscow program, 12 April 2014

Alexei Ilyich Miller (Russian: Алексе́й Ильи́ч Ми́ллер; born 4 September 1959) is employed in the Institute of Scientific Information on Social Sciences of the Russian Academy of Sciences, the European University at Saint Petersburg and the Higher School of Economics in Moscow. He is also a member of the Russian governmental institution Council for Foreign and Defense Policy (otherwise, known as the Valdai Discussion Club).

== Research and Politics ==
Before the Russian invasion of Ukraine in 2022, Miller used to lecture and do research at Central European University (2012–14) and in the Institut für die Wissenschaften vom Menschen (2001). However, already following the Russian annexation of Crimea in 2014, Miller began supporting the Kremlin's imperialism by claiming that the Ukrainian nation does not exist.

At present, Miller is an important supporter of the war and the Russian president. The scholar uses history for justifying the Kremlin's full-scale attack on Ukraine. For instance, he proposes that Vladimir Putin's 'speech of 21 February 2022, which heralded the beginning of a special military operation in Ukraine, marked the transition from [Russian] debates about history to practical actions to change its course.'

In 2024, the Russian Academy of Sciences published Miller's anthology Украинский вопрос и политика идентичности [The Ukrainian Question and Identity Politics]. It was widely discussed, notably, without the participation of any Ukrainian or foreign scholars. The work is now seen as the officially obtaining Russian view of Ukrainian history.

== Selected books and publications ==
- (2003) The Ukrainian Question: The Russian Empire and Nationalism in the Nineteenth Century (Central European University Press)
- (2008) The Romanov Empire and Nationalism: Essays in the Methodology of Historical Research (Central European University Press)
