= Innocent (Giesel) =

Prussian-born historian and writer

Innocent Giesel
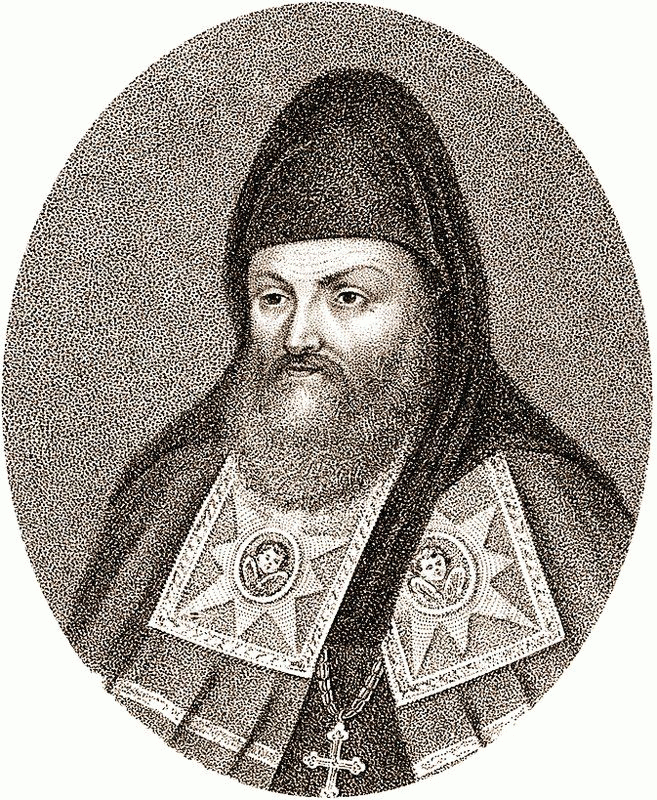
- Innokentiy Gizel
- Born: c. 1600; East Prussia
- Died: 18 November 1683 (aged 83); Kyiv, Cossack Hetmanate, Tsardom of Moscow
- Occupations: Clergyman; educator; theologian; publisher; poet
- Writing career
- Language: Latin, Church Slavonic, Ruthenian, Polish
- Period: 1645-1683
- Genres: Polemic literature, schoolbooks
- Literary movement: Ukrainian Baroque

Innocent Gizel (German: Innozenz Giesel, Russian: Иннокентий (Гизель), romanized: Innokenty (Gizel), Ukrainian: Інокентій Ґізель; c. 1600 – November 18, 1683) was a Prussian-born historian, writer, and political and ecclesiastic figure active in Kyiv. He adopted Orthodox Christianity and made a substantial contribution to Russian and Ukrainian culture.

Described as one of the greatest intellectual and spiritual authorities of his time, Gizel is known to have supported the unification of Ukraine and Russia, but at the same time defended the autonomy of Kyiv clergy. Innokentiy Gizel is generally credited for writing the Synopsis in 1674, but some researchers reject his authorship.

== Biography ==
Gizel family became prominent serving the noble lords of Volhynia, then part of the Polish-Lithuanian Commonwealth. Innocent Gizel worked as a subordinate of metropolitan Peter Mohyla, managing the printing house of Kyiv Pechersk Lavra. Between 1646 and 1656 he served as hegumen of the St. Nicholas Monastery in Kyiv. During the 1640s Gizel was a rector of the Kyiv Mohyla Academy and introduced the first full course of philosophy (Opus totius philosophiae) in the establishment. In 1656, he was appointed archmandrite of the Kiev Pechersk Lavra.

== Works ==
=== Publications ===
- First Church Slavonic printed publication of Kyiv Pechersk Patericon (1661, 1678)
- True Faith (Prawdziwa Wiara, 1668) - a polemic treatise
- Peace with God for Man (Миръ съ Богомъ человЂку, 1669, 1671) - a school book for priests
- Synopsis (1674) - alleged authorship of Giesel not proven

=== Poetry ===
In the heraldic poem published as introduction to his work Peace with God for Man (1669) Gizel praised tsar Alexis Mikhailovich as a peacemaker.

== Sources ==
- Magocsi, Paul Robert (1996). A History of Ukraine: The Land and Its Peoples (2nd, revised ed.). University of Toronto Press. ISBN 978-1-4426-9879-6. Archived from the original on 14 June 2020.
