= Little Russia =

Historic and geographic term for Ukraine

Little Russia; Малая Русь; Мала Русь
- Region of the Russian Empire
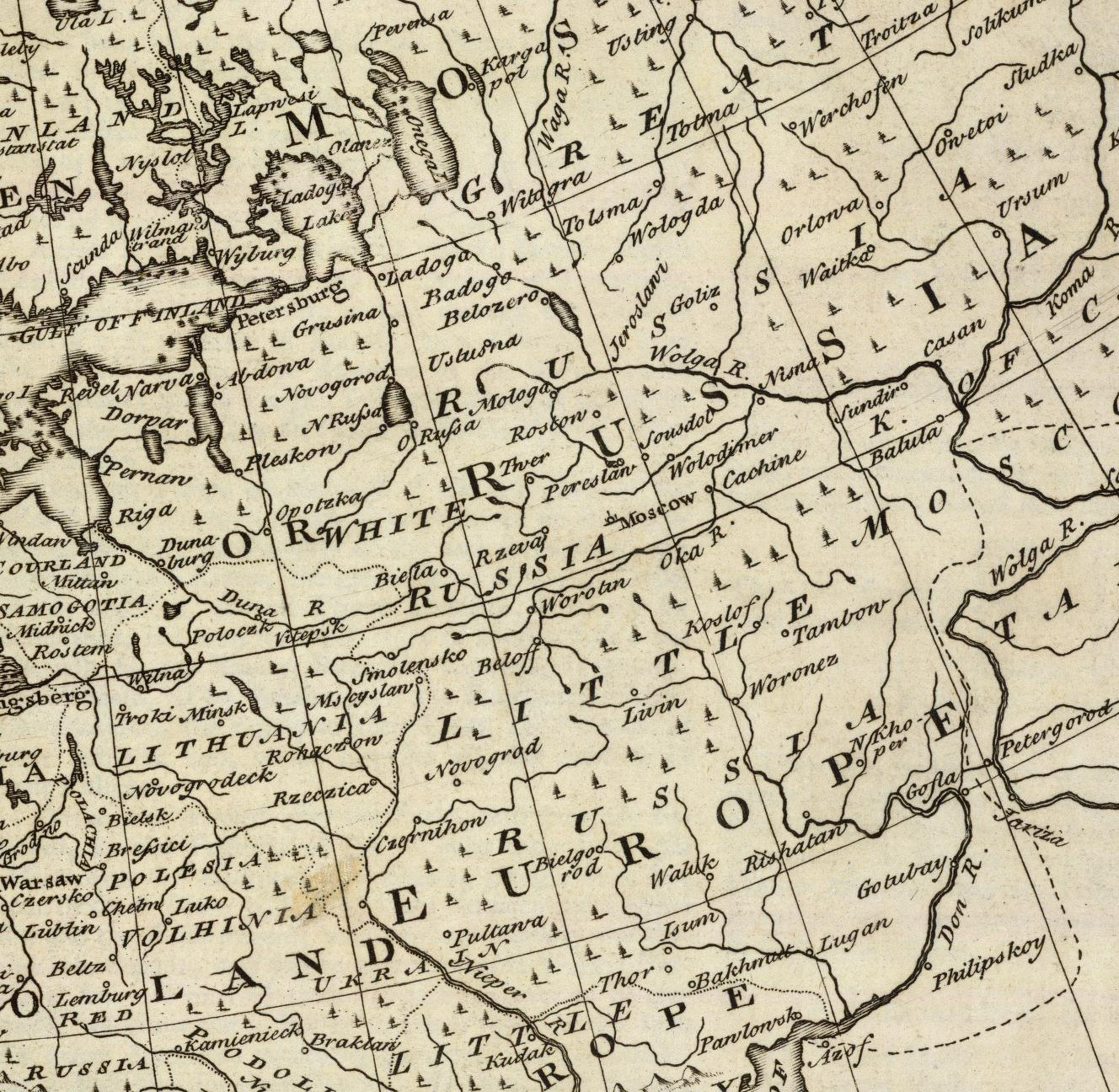
- A fragment of the “new and accurate map of Europe collected from the best authorities...” by Emanuel Bowen published in 1747 in his A Complete System of Geography. The territory between Novhorod-Siverskyi and Tambov is shown as “Little Russia”. White Russia is located north-east of Smolensk, and the legend “Ukrain” straddles the Dnieper river near Poltava.
- Today part of: Belarus; Russia; Ukraine; Moldova

Little Russia, (Note: Russian: Малороссия, romanized: Malorossiia; Ukrainian: Малоросія, romanized: Malorosiia.) also known as Lesser Russia, Malorussia, or Little Rus', (Note: Russian: Малая Русь, romanized: Malaia Rus; Ukrainian: Мала Русь, romanized: Mala Rus, from Greek: Μικρὰ Ῥωσία, romanized: Mikrá Rosía).) is a geographical and historical term used to describe Ukraine.

At the beginning of the 14th century, the patriarch of Constantinople accepted the distinction between what it called the eparchies of Megalē Rosiia (lit. 'Great Rus, Great Russia') and Mikrà Rosiia (lit. 'Little Rus, Little Russia'). The jurisdiction of the latter became the metropolis of Halych in 1303. The specific meaning of the adjectives "Great" and "Little" in this context is unclear. It is possible that terms such as "Little" and "Lesser" at the time simply meant geographically smaller and/or less populous, or having fewer eparchies. Another possibility is that it denoted a relationship similar to that between a homeland and a colony (just as "Magna Graecia" denoted a Greek colony).

The name went out of use in the 15th century as distinguishing the "Great" and "Little" was no longer necessary since the Russian Orthodox Church based in Moscow was no longer tied to Kiev. However, with the rise of the Catholic Ruthenian Uniate Church in the Polish–Lithuanian Commonwealth, Orthodox prelates attempting to seek support from Moscow revived the name using the Greek-influenced spelling: Malaia Rossiia ('Little Russia'). Then, "Little Russia" developed into a political and geographical concept in Russia, referring to most of the territory of modern-day Ukraine, especially the territory of the Cossack Hetmanate. Accordingly, derivatives such as "Little Russian" (Russian: Малоросс, romanized: Maloross) (Note: Plural: малороссы, malorossy. Alternatively: малороссиянин, malorossiianin, малорус, malorus) were commonly applied to the people, language, and culture of the area. A large part of the region's elite population adopted a Little Russian identity that competed with the local Ukrainian identity. The territories of modern-day southern Ukraine, after being annexed by Russia in the 18th century, became known as Novorossiya ('New Russia').

After the collapse of the Russian Empire in 1917, and with the amalgamation of Ukrainian territories into one administrative unit (the Ukrainian People's Republic and then the Ukrainian Soviet Socialist Republic), the term started to recede from common use. Today, the term is anachronistic, and many Ukrainians regard its usage as offensive.

== Etymology ==
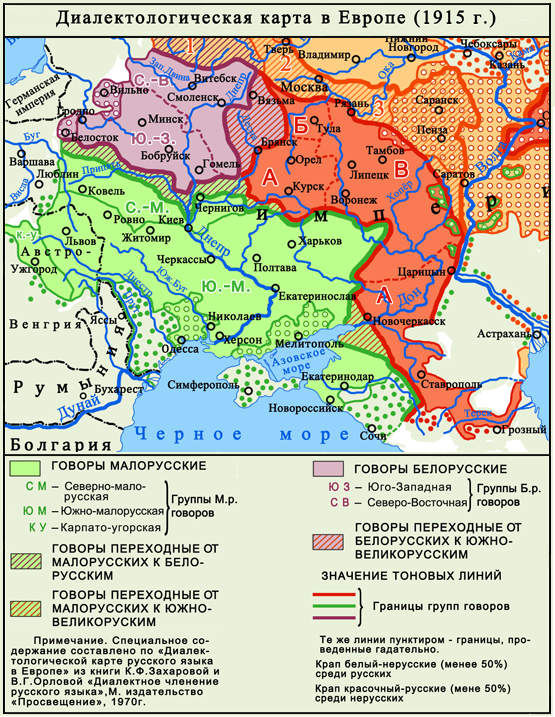
Dialectal partition of the Russian language in 1915, including Great Russian (red), Little Russian (green) and White Russian (purple)

The toponym is adapted from the Greek term, which was used in medieval times by the patriarchs of Constantinople from the beginning of the 14th century. The Byzantines accepted the distinction between Μεγάλη Ῥωσσία (Megálē Rhōssía, lit. 'Great Rus', Great Russia'), meaning the northern or outer region, and Μικρὰ Ῥωσσία (Mikrà Rhōssía, lit. 'Little Rus', Little Russia'), meaning the southern or inner region. From 1448, the former became ecclesiastically independent as the Russian Orthodox Church based in Moscow declared autocephaly, and from 1458, the latter had its own metropolitans who were approved by the patriarch of Constantinople. Previously, the jurisdiction of the latter had become the metropolis of Halych in 1303. By the early 15th century, the terms disappeared and Great Russia would not re-appear in sources until during the 16th century, while Little Russia would not re-appear until the end of that century.

Initially Little or Lesser meant the nearer part, as after the division of the metropolis (ecclesiastical province) in 1305, a new southwestern metropolis in the Kingdom of Galicia–Volhynia consisted of only 6 of the 19 former eparchies. It later lost its ecclesiastical associations and became a geographical name only. Zygmunt Gloger, in his Geography of Historic Lands of Old Poland (Polish: Geografia historyczna ziem dawnej Polski), describes an alternative view of the term Little in relation to Little Russia, where he compares it to the similar term Little Poland.

In Russian, the notion of Rossiia, which was used as the common designation for the multinational Russian Empire and for the modern Russian state, is closely related to the older terms Rus and russkii. Rossiia is distinguished from the ethnonym russkii, as Rossiia refers to a supranational identity, among them ethnic Russians. During the imperial era, Rossiia referred to a multinational state, while the ethnic term russkii officially included all East Slavs, namely the Great Russians, Little Russians and White Russians. In this sense, the Ukrainians, who were known as Little Russians, were part of an all-Russian identity. The rise of modern Russian nationalism created the concept of an ethnic Russian nation with the political concept of the Russian Empire, which was aimed at a new project of an ethnically homogeneous nation-state.

== Historical usage ==
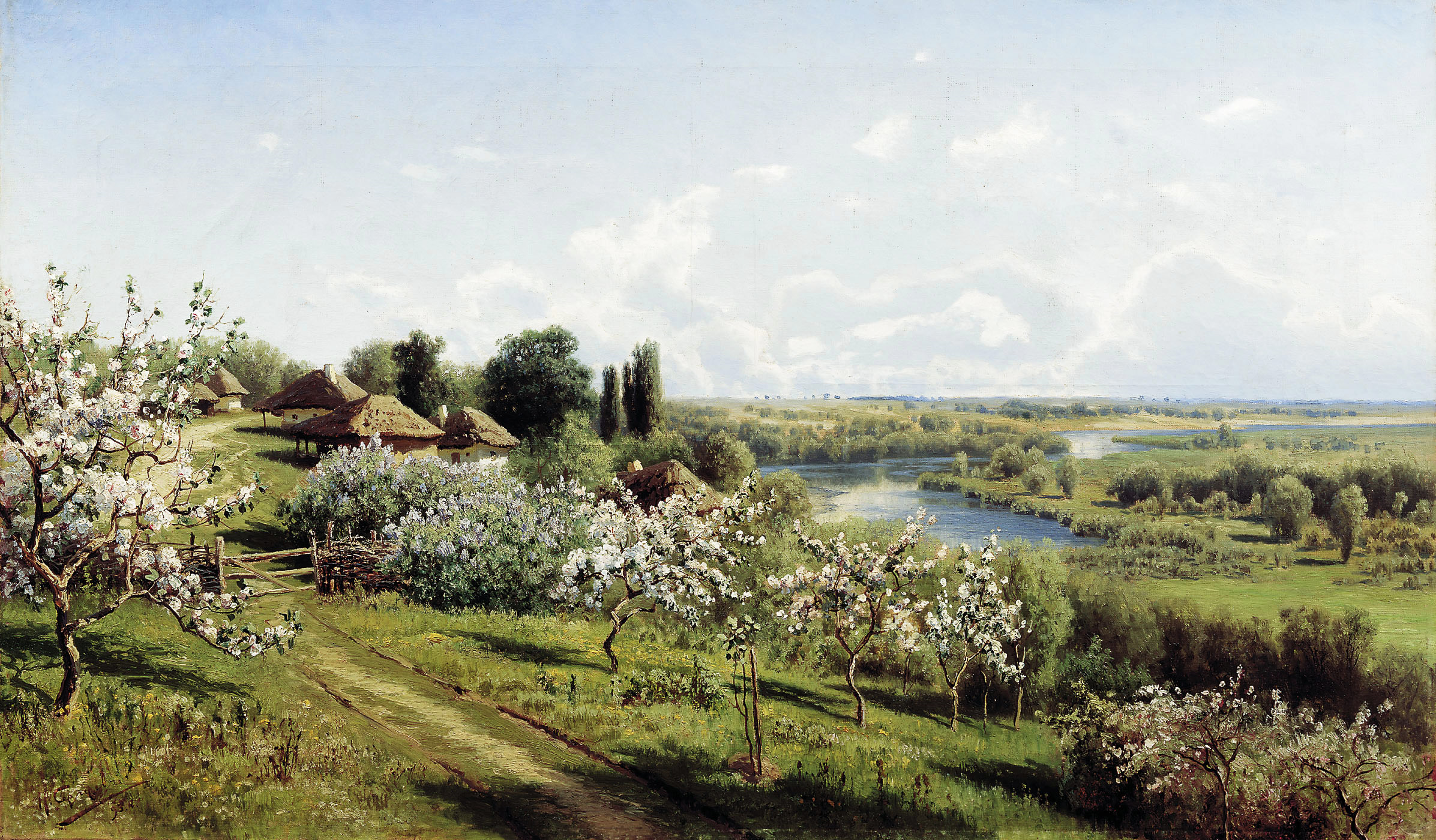
Apple Blossom. In Little Russia, Nikolay Sergeyev. (1895)

1904 map showing boundaries of Little Russia (including portions of Sloboda Ukraine) and South Russia (in place of New Russia) as separate provinces

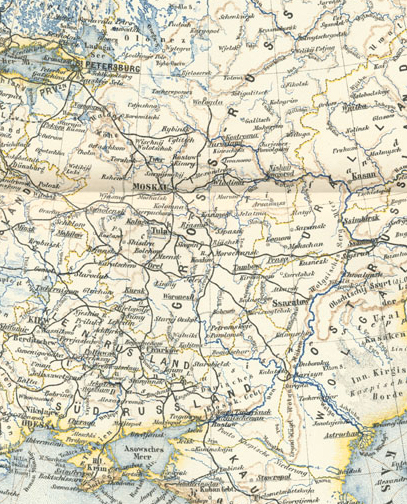
This original German map titled Europäisches Russland (European Russia) published in 1885–1890 by Meyers Konversations-Lexikon uses the terms Klein-Russland and Gross-Russland, which literally mean Little Russia and Great Russia, respectively

In Little Russia, photo by Sergey Prokudin-Gorsky, (1905–1915)

The term was used by Patriarch Callistus I of Constantinople in 1361, when he created two metropolitan sees: Megalē Rosiia (lit. 'Great Rus, Great Russia') and Mikrà Rosiia (lit. 'Little Rus, Little Russia'). The former referred to the province of Moscow and Vladimir, while the latter referred to the province of Halych and Kiev. King Casimir III of Poland was called "the king of Lechia and Little Rus". Yuri II Boleslav used the term in a 1335 letter to Dietrich von Altenburg, the Grand Master of the Teutonic Knights, where he styled himself as dux totius Rusiæ Minoris. According to Mykhaylo Hrushevsky, the term was associated with the Kingdom of Galicia–Volhynia, and after its downfall, the name ceased to be used.

At the beginning of the 17th century, Ukrainian churchmen studying Greek sources took up the term Malorossiia and introduced it into the title of the metropolitan of Kiev, who was elected in 1620. At the time, the term Little Russia referred to the East Slavic lands in the Polish–Lithuanian Commonwealth, whose inhabitants were also known as Ruthenians or rusyny. The term Great Russia also began to be used by the Ukrainian churchmen in the 1640s when contact with Moscow increased and it was subsequently adopted in Russia. In 1654, both Little Russia and Great Russia appeared in the title of the Muscovite tsar for the first time. This was preceded by the Cossack Hetmanate falling under Russian protection. From this point on, the Russian government used the term Little Russia to express the idea that left-bank Ukraine and later other regions of Ukraine belonged to Russia.

The term has been used in letters of Cossack hetmans, particularly Bohdan Khmelnytsky, as well as Ivan Sirko. Innokentiy Gizel, the archimandrite of the Kiev-Pechersk Lavra, wrote that the Russian people were a union of three branches—Great Russia, Little Russia, and White Russia—under the sole legal authority of the Muscovite tsars. The term Little Russia has also been used in Ukrainian chronicles written by Samiilo Velychko, as well as in a chronicle of the hieromonk Leontiy (Bobolinski), and in Thesaurus by the archimandrite Ioannikiy (Golyatovsky).

From 1762, Little Russia represented the Cossack Hetmanate in left-bank Ukraine, or more precisely, its elites, who had aimed to acquire equal rights with Great Russia in the framework of the Russian Empire. At the time, Great Russia referred to the area of Russia inhabited by ethnic Russians. The usage of the name was later broadened to apply loosely to the parts of right-bank Ukraine when it was annexed by Russia at the end of the 18th century upon the partitions of Poland. In the 18th and 19th centuries, the Russian Imperial administrative units known as the Little Russian Governorate and eponymous General Governorship were formed and existed for several decades before being split and renamed in subsequent administrative reforms.

Until the end of the 19th century, Little Russia was the prevailing term for much of the modern territory of Ukraine that was part of the Russian Empire, as well as for its people and their language. This can be seen from its usage in numerous scholarly, literary and artistic works. Ukrainophile historians Mykhaylo Maksymovych, Mykola Kostomarov, Dmytro Bahaliy, and Volodymyr Antonovych acknowledged the fact that during the Russo-Polish wars, Ukraine had only a geographical meaning, referring to the borderlands of both states, but Little Russia was the ethnonym of Little (Southern) Russian people. In his work Two Russian Nationalities, Kostomarov uses Southern Rus and Little Russia interchangeably. Mykhailo Drahomanov titled his first fundamental historic work Little Russia in Its literature (1867–1870).

The Little Russians (Ukrainians) were widely regarded by educated Russians at the start of the 20th century as an integral part of the Russian nation. Assimilation to Russian language and culture among Ukrainian elites was common from the 18th century, but after the 1863 January Uprising in Poland, the Russification of Ukrainians became an explicit goal of the Russian government. The Russophiles of Galicia in the Austrian Empire also advocated for merging into the Russian nation. The Galician Russophiles were the most important branch of the Ruthenian national movement for decades. As a result, if Russification had been successful, Ukrainian nation building could have ended or at least have been interrupted.

The name Ukraine was reintroduced in the 19th century in a conscious effort to awaken Ukrainian national awareness. At the same time, Little Russia began to acquire its pejorative meaning as the inferior part of Russia. The name Malorossy ("Little Russians") was later used by nationally conscious Ukrainians as a negative term for those who were loyal to the Russian Empire and had integrated themselves into Russian culture and language. By the early 20th century, the terms Ukraine and Ukrainians had become the common self-designation, while Ukraine has been used as an official name since 1917, at first for the Ukrainian People's Republic, then the Ukrainian Soviet Socialist Republic. After World War II, the term Ukraine included Ruthenians in Western Ukraine and all Ukrainian-speaking territories were united into one polity for the first time.

== Modern usage ==
The term Little Russia is now anachronistic when used to refer to the country Ukraine and the modern Ukrainian nation, its language, culture, etc. Such usage is typically perceived as conveying an imperialist view that the Ukrainian territory and people ("Little Russians") belong to "one, indivisible Russia". Today, many Ukrainians consider the term disparaging, indicative of Russian suppression of Ukrainian identity and language.

It has continued to be used in Russian nationalist discourse, in which modern Ukrainians are presented as a single people in a united Russian nation. This has provoked new hostility toward and disapproval of the term by many Ukrainians. In July 2021 Vladimir Putin published a 7000-word essay, a large part of which was devoted to expounding these views.

== "Little Russianness" ==
The concept of "Little Russianness" (Ukrainian: малоросійство, romanized: malorosiistvo) is defined by some Ukrainian authors as a provincial complex they see in parts of the Ukrainian community due to its lengthy existence within the Russian Empire. They describe it as an "indifferent, and sometimes a negative stance towards Ukrainian national-statehood traditions and aspirations, and often as active support of Russian culture and of Russian imperial policies". Mykhailo Drahomanov, who used the terms Little Russia and Little Russian in his historical works, applied the term Little Russianness to Russified Ukrainians, whose national character was formed under "alien pressure and influence" and who consequently adopted the "worse qualities of other nationalities and lost the better ones of their own". Ukrainian conservative ideologue and politician Vyacheslav Lypynsky defined the term as "the malaise of statelessness". The same inferiority complex has been said to apply to the Ukrainians of Galicia with respect to Poland (gente ruthenus, natione polonus). The related term Madiarony has been used to describe Magyarized Rusyns in Carpathian Ruthenia who advocated for the union of that region with Hungary.

In the words of Ukrainian literary critic Yevhen Malaniuk, "Little Russianness is a malaise, an illness, a mutilation inside of the nation. It is national defeatism... Little Russianness is neither a policy nor a tactic, but always merely a premature and total capitulation. The term "Little Russians" has also been used to denote stereotypically uneducated, rustic Ukrainians exhibiting little or no self-esteem. The uncouth stage persona of popular Ukrainian singer and performer Andriy Mykhailovych Danylko is an embodiment of this stereotype; his Surzhyk-speaking drag persona Verka Serduchka has also been seen as perpetuating this demeaning image. Danylko himself usually laughs off such criticism of his work, and many art critics argue that his success with the Ukrainian public is rooted in the unquestionable authenticity of his presentation.

== In popular culture ==
Tchaikovsky's Symphony No 2 in C minor, Op 17, is nicknamed the "Little Russian" from its use of Ukrainian folk tunes. According to historian Harlow Robinson, Nikolay Kashkin, a friend of the composer as well as a well-known musical critic in Moscow, "suggested the moniker in his 1896 book Memories of Tchaikovsky."

== See also ==
- Great Russia
- White Ruthenia
- Bibliography of Russian history
- Bibliography of Ukrainian history
- List of Slavic studies journals
- Gente Ruthenus, natione Polonus – phrase describing Polonized Ruthenians (Belarusians, Rusyns, and Ukrainians)
- Red Ruthenia
