= History of Lithuania (book) =

2005–2011 series of history reference books

History of Lithuania (Lithuanian: Lietuvos istorija) or Academic History of Lithuania (Lithuanian: Akademinė Lietuvos istorija) is a thirteen-volume series of books dedicated to the history of Lithuania. The project is organised by the Lithuanian Institute of History, with the assistance of various Lithuanian universities.

The first volume was published in 2005, and its last volume was originally scheduled for publication in 2011, though only five volumes had been released by 2011. It is the largest and the most comprehensive academic publication covering Lithuania's history ever released.

== Background ==
After Lithuania regained its independence from the Soviet Union in 1990, a number of academic works were published by prominent historians of the state's history. These included Edvardas Gudavičius‘ "Lietuvos istorija. Nuo seniausių laikų iki 1569 metų" (English: History of Lithuania. From ancient times to the year 1569) in 1999; Zigmantas Kiaupa's "Lietuvos valstybės istorija" (English: History of the State of Lithuania) in 2004; and Alfredas Bumblauskas’ "Senosios Lietuvos istorija 1009–1795" (English: The Early History of Lithuania from 1009–1795) in 2005. However, the majority of these were dedicated to specific time frames and did not cover the entire period from prehistory to the modern era.

The first proposal to issue a complete history may be credited to Professor Antanas Tyla. The suggestion was reinforced by academic Vytautas Merkys. The opportunity to issue a fundamental and comprehensive academic work arose in 2000 when a programme sponsored by the Lithuanian Institute of History, coordinated by Prof. Habil. Dr. Jūratė Kiaupienė, was approved.

Per the approved programme, each volume of the Academic History will cover a particular historical time frame, and its thirteen volumes will encompass Lithuania's entire history. After its completion, it will be the largest academic publication covering Lithuania's history ever released and will include the latest research findings. Its intent is to transcend narrow historical perspectives and to focus on the evolution of Lithuania. Political, ethical, confessional, and judicial themes will be covered in a European context, and the modern works of Ukrainian, Russian, and other states' historians will be examined.

Initially, twelve volumes were planned, but after the work began it became evident that coverage of modern Lithuanian history would require an additional volume. The successive volumes will be the same size – 25.5 cm x 16.5 cm. The editorial board of the series consists of the following scholars: Habil. Dr. Algirdas Girininkas, Dr. Artūras Dubonis, Prof. Dr. Zigmantas Kiaupa, Prof. Habil. Dr. Jūratė Kiaupienė, Dr. Česlovas Laurinavičius, Dr. Rimantas Miknys, Dr. Gintautas Sliesoriūnas, and Dr. Gintautas Zabiela. More than 20 scholars are working on this project. Each volume is peer-reviewed and has an additional responsible editor. The Lithuanian Institute of History is acting in cooperation with Lithuanian universities, including Vilnius University, increasing scholarly involvement in the project.

== Volume I ==
The series' first volume, "Lietuvos istorija. Akmens amžius ir ankstyvasis metalų leikotrapis" (English: History of Lithuania. Stone Age and Early Metal Era), was released in 2005. This volume covers the period between the end of the last ice age and the first written mention of the inhabitants of the Baltic region. It covers approximately 10,000 years, investigating the development of communities during the Paleolithic, Mesolithic, and Neolithic eras and the Bronze Age in a local and European context. Forest dwellers are examined along with agrarian societies. It features an improved periodisation of epochs, and social developments are analyzed using not only archaeological findings, but the methodologies of the natural sciences as well. The genesis and evolution of particular local cultures such as Mesolithic Nemunas and Neolithic Nemunas is discussed.

The 357-page volume was written by authors known for their field work in archaeology and the prehistory of Lithuania: Dr. Tomas Ostrauskas, Dr. Vygandas Juodagalvis, Hab. Dr. Algirdas Girininkas, and Dr. Džiugas Brazaitis. Its responsible editor was Algirdas Girininkas. The volume was peer-reviewed by Prof. Habil. Dr. Vladas Žulkus and Dr. Algimantas Merkevičius.

== Volume II ==
The second volume, entitled "Lietuvos istorija. Geležies amžius" (English: History of Lithuania. The Iron Age), was issued in 2007. It encompassed the era between the 1st century and the 12th century. Invoking archaeological research, it discusses Lithuania's formation and development, and the impacts made by the Vikings and by Rus. An in-depth analysis was made of the evolution of the Baltic tribes in the region since these Lithuanians were the only Balts to create their own state.

The volume was written by Dr. Gintautas Zabiela, Habil. Dr. Vytautas Kazakevičius, Dr. Ilona Vaškevičiūtė, Dr. Rasa Banytė Rowell, and Dr. Darius Baronas; the responsible editor was Gintautas Zabiela. During the volume's preparation, Vytautas Kazakevičius died, and his work was finished by Zabiela. The 517-page volume was peer-reviewed by Dr. Albinas Kuncevičius and Dr. Mindaugas Bertašius.

== Volume XII ==
In 2008 another volume of the book was released, entitled "Sąjūdis: nuo "Persitvarkymo" iki Kovo 11-osios" (English: History of Lithuania. Sąjūdis: from "Restructuring" till March 11). This volume was written by Dr. Česlovas Laurinavičius and Dr. Vladas Sirutavičius. Currently available I part of the XII volume.

== Volumes III through XIII ==
The third volume will begin with the 12th century; the thirteenth and last volume will cover the 21st century. The last volume was initially scheduled for release in 2011. According to a preliminary assessment, the remaining volumes will be organized and edited as follows:

Volume	Time frame	Responsible editor
III	End of the 13th century to about 1386	Dr. Artūras Dubonis
IV	1386 or 1387 to the 16th century	Prof. Habil. Dr. Jūratė Kiaupienė
V	16th century to 1588	Prof. Habil. Dr. Jūratė Kiaupienė
VI	1588 to 1733/1734	Dr. Gintautas Sliesoriūnas
VII	1733 to 1795	Prof. Dr. Zigmantas Kiaupa
VIII and IX	1795 to 1915	Dr. Rimantas Miknys
X	1915 to 1940	Dr. Česlovas Laurinavičius
XI	1940 to 1988/1990	Dr. Arūnas Bubnys
XII and XIII	End of the 20th century to the beginning of the 21st century	Dr. Česlovas Laurinavičius
