= Jūratė Kiaupienė =

Lithuanian historian

Jūratė Kiaupienė (born December 23, 1947, in Vilnius) is a Lithuanian historian, professor, Habilitated Doctor.

== Education ==
In 1969 Jūratė Kiaupienė finished her studies in History department of Vilnius University and obtain historian speciality. After finishing university she worked in Lithuanian History and Ethnography Museum, in 1972 was appointed in Lithuanian Science Academy office. Later she worked as docent in History Department of Vilnius Pedagogical University. From 1989 works in the Grand Duchy of Lithuania's History Department of Lithuanian Institute of History. In 1984 Kiaupienė defended her thesis Agrariniai santykiai Žemaitijoje XVI–XVIII a, she also lectures in Vytautas Magnus University in Kaunas. From 1997 till 2001 lectured history and historiography of Grand Duchy of Lithuania curse in Warsaw and Poznan universities. For her work in compiling sources for publication 1385 m. rugpjūčio 14 d. Krėvos aktas (English: 1385 August 14. Act of Krėva) received an award. In 2005 Jūratė Kiaupienė was habilitated. Currently Jūratė Kiaupienė is coordinating Academic History of Lithuania protect.

== Main area of interest ==
- History of nobility of Grand Duchy of Lithuania
- History of Grand Duchy of Lithuania
- Research of Grand Duchy of Lithuania's international treaties and others

== Selected publications ==
- Zigmantas Kiaupa, Jūratė Kiaupienė, Albinas Kuncevičius. Lietuvos istorija iki 1795 metų, Vilnius: Valstybinis leidybos centras, 2000, 381
- Zigmantas Kiaupa, Jūratė Kiaupienė, Albinas Kuncevičius. The History of Lithuania before 1795, Vilnius: Arlila, 2000, 402
- 1385 m. rugpjūčio 14 d. Krėvos aktas. Compiled by Jūratė Kiaupienė, co-authors Rūta Čapaitė, Jūratė Kiaupienė, Edmundas Rimša, S. C. Rowell, Eugenija Ulčinaitė, Vilnius: Žara, 2002, 143
- Kiaupienė, Jūratė. „Mes, Lietuva“: Lietuvos Didžiosios Kunigaikštystės bajorija XVI a. (viešasis ir privatus gyvenimas), LII, Vilnius: Kronta, 2003, 303.
- Geschichtsquellen des Ostseeraumes in der Litauischen Metrik, Zwischen Lübeck und Novgorod. Wirtsxhaft, Politik und Kultur im Ostseeraum vom frühen Mittelalter bis ins 20. Jahrhundert. Norbert Angermann zum 60. Geburtstag, hrsg. v. Ortwin Pelc und Gertrud Pickhan. Institut Nordostdeutsches Kulturwerk, Lüneburg, 1996, S. 223–232.
- The Grand Duchy of Lithuania in East Central Europe or once again about the Lithuanian-Polish Union, Lithuanian Historical Studies, Vilnius, 1997, vol. 2, p. 56–71
- Obraz Wielkiego Księstwa Litewskiego w historiografii XIX i XX wieku, Samoidentyfikacja mniejszości narodowych i religijnych w Europie Srodkowo-Wschodniej. Historia i historiografia, red.: J. Lewandowski, W. Goleman, Lublin, 1999, s. 73–80
- Współczesna historiografia litewska. Stan aktualny oraz perspektywy badań historii Wielkiego Księstwa Litewskiego i dziewiętnastowiecznej Litwy, Samoidentyfikacja mniejszości narodowych i religijnych w Europie Srodkowo-Wschodniej. Historia i historiografia, red.: J. Lewandowski, W. Goleman, Lublin, 1999, s. 81–89
- Idée de l`Etat et son rőle dans le processus d`intégration du Grand Duché de Lituanie – région pluriethnique, pluriconfessionnelle et pluriculturelle de l`Europe du Centre-Est, Frontieres et l`espace national en Europe du Centre-Est. Exemples de quatre pays; Biélorussie, Lituanie, Pologne et Ukraine, sous la diréction de: Jerzy Kłoczowski, Piotr Plisiecki, Hubert Łaszkiewicz, Lublin, 2000, s.102–108.
