= Gudowicz =

Gudowicz is a Polish family name. It can be transliterated from Russian, Belarusian, and Ukrainian as Gudovich, and the Lithuanian form is Gudavičius.

- Lya Mara (born Aleksandra Gudowicz; 1897–1960), one of the biggest stars of the German silent cinema
- Edvardas Gudavičius (1929–2020), Lithuanian historian specializing in history of Grand Duchy of Lithuania
- Ivan Gudovich (1741–1820), Russian noble and military leader
- Andrey Gudovich, Russian noble, military leader and statesman
