= Eastern Belorussia =

Historical region of Belarus

Eastern Belarus
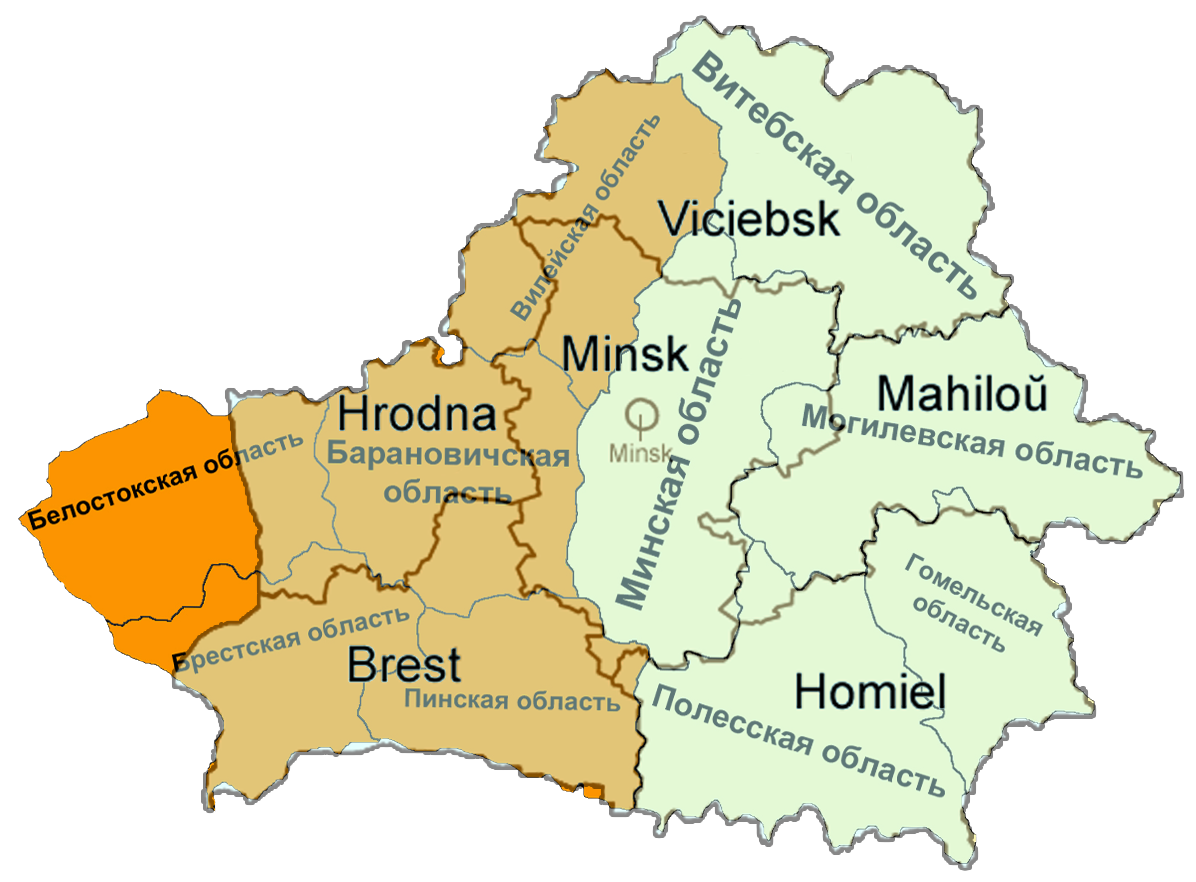
- Administrative division of the Byelorussian SSR (green) before World War II with territories annexed by the Soviet Union from Poland in 1939 (marked in shades of orange), overlaid with territory of present-day Belarus
- Country: Belarus
- Area: Historical region
- Today part of: Minsk; Minsk (partially), Mogilev, and Vitsebsk (partially) regions

Eastern Belorussia (Eastern Belarus; Belarusian: Усхо́дняя Белару́сь, romanized: Uskhodniaia Bielarus) is a historical region of Belarus traditionally inhabited by members of the Eastern Orthodox Church, in contrast to the largely-Catholic western Belorussia. Historically dominated politically by the peasantry, eastern Belorussia was a stronghold of the Belarusian Socialist Assembly after the February Revolution and later became the Byelorussian Soviet Socialist Republic during the interwar period.

== History ==
According to historian Grigory Ioffe, eastern Belorussia was among the first places in Belarus to adopt the demonym "Belarusian", doing so during the late 19th century. At the same time, western Belorussians commonly called themselves Litvins, while residents of Polesia referred to themselves as Poleshuks.

=== Development of Belarusian nationalism ===
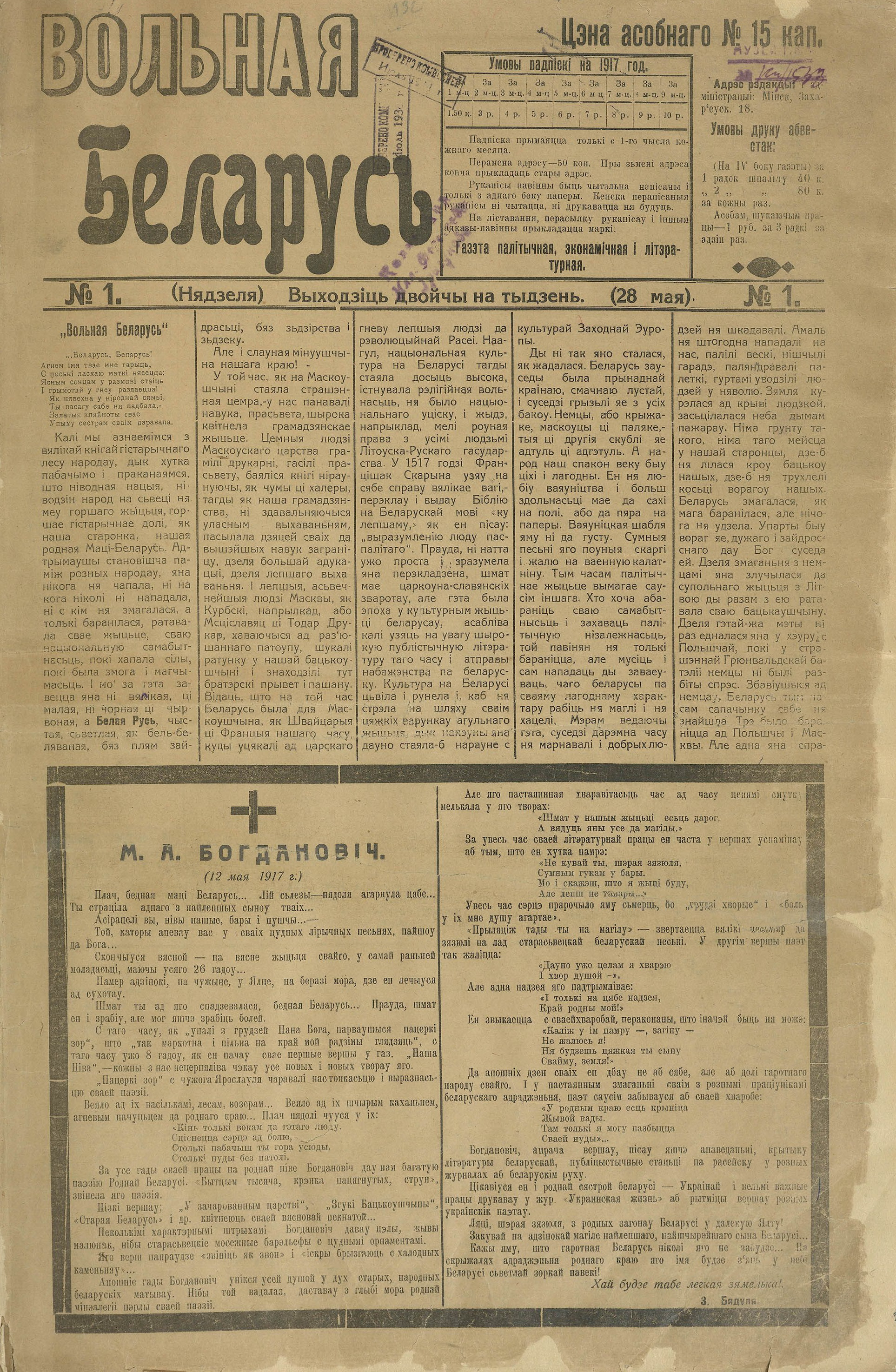
The first issue of Volnaja Bielarus, a Belarusian nationalist newspaper in eastern Belorussia

Prior to 1917, eastern Belorussia fell within the Minsk, Mogilev, and Vitebsk Governorates of the Russian Empire. In contrast to the nationally-minded western Belorussia, the development of Belarusian nationalism in eastern Belorussia was hampered by political apathy and lack of association with the Catholic intelligentsia that had formed the basis of the Belarusian nationalist movement. Further problems were caused by the 1915 division of Belarus into eastern and western halves during World War I, with the west being occupied by the Imperial German Army. As a result of this, eastern Belorussia was overwhelmed by an influx of Polish refugees and non-Belarusian soldiers from the Imperial Russian Army.

The process of spreading Belarusian national sentiment in eastern Belorussia began in earnest after the February Revolution. Jazep Losik established Volnaja Bielarus on 28 May 1917 as an eastern equivalent to the Vilnius-based Nasha Niva. The development of Belarusian nationalism in eastern Belorussia was also influenced by theatre, an effort supported by Belarusian nationalist leader Anton Luckievich.

The October Revolution and subsequent First All-Belarusian Congress led to a rapid development of Belarusian nationalism, with eastern and western Belorussia being split along political lines; the Belarusian Socialist Assembly found itself as the dominant party in eastern Belorussia, while Belarusian Christian Democracy became the leading party in western Belorussia. This split also manifested as one between those who favoured a complete split from Russia (an idea popular among western Belarusians) and those who supported temporary union with Russia, primarily from eastern Belarusian-supported politicians. However, when Bolsheviks stormed the congress, it was unanimously agreed to declare the Belarusian Democratic Republic.

=== Under Soviet rule ===
Emblem of the Byelorussian Soviet Socialist Republic in 1927

The Belarusian Democratic Republic ultimately proved to be short-lived, and the country was partitioned between the Soviet Union and the Second Polish Republic as part of the 1921 Treaty of Riga. Eastern Belorussia became the Byelorussian Soviet Socialist Republic, while western Belorussia became part of the Kresy.

Eastern Belorussia developed a separate form of Belarusian nationalism from western Belorussia, with the intelligentsia-dominated western nationalism contrasting with the peasant-based eastern nationalism before being marginalised and destroyed during the Great Purge. Prominent symbols of Belarusian nationalism emerging from the peasantry, such as the Belarusian Soviet partisans, partisan commander and politician Pyotr Masherov, the rock band Pesniary, the flag of Belarus, and Russophilia, remain associated with eastern Belarusian nationalism today.

During World War II, eastern Belorussia was home to a large Jewish resistance movement. Though the eastern Belarusian Jewish population was largely killed as part of the Holocaust, Jews in eastern Belorussia actively resisted Nazism through several forms, including forgery, participation in trade with gentiles, and armed resistance. Following the war's conclusion and the death and state funeral of Joseph Stalin, Mikhail Zimyanin gave a report on the status of eastern and western Belorussia, noting that the eastern portion of the republic was staffed by more ethnic Belarusians than western Belorussia. Zimyanin also noted that in 1952, the average daily wage of a kolkhoz worker in eastern Belorussia was 37 kopecks, as well as one kilogram of grain and 1.4 kilograms of potatoes. This was higher than the average daily wage of kolkhoz workers in western Belorussia, who received 27 kopecks, 1.3 kilograms of grain, and 0.5 kilograms of potatoes.

=== Since 1991 ===
Since Belarus achieved independence in 1991, the divide between western and eastern Belorussia has remained a matter of political importance. The 1994 Belarusian presidential election marked a conflict between the eastern Alexander Lukashenko and the western Zianon Pazniak and Stanislav Shushkevich. The election ultimately led to a victory for Lukashenko, who has variously supported eastern manifestations of Belarusian nationalism or unification of Belarus and Russia.

== Religion ==
Since the Synod of Polotsk dissolved the Ruthenian Uniate Church, eastern Belorussia has trended more towards Eastern Orthodoxy, rather than the Catholicism dominant in western Belorussia. This has been particularly true since the 1990s, with Belarusian religious historian Viktar Starastsienka proclaiming the existence of a "religious revival" in eastern Belorussia since the 1990s. Lukashenko also occasionally appeals to Orthodox sentiment as president, referring to himself as an "Orthodox atheist" and making various anti-Catholic statements. However, Ioffe has stated that the issue has become a matter of less importance than in the past, due to increased atheism among Belarusians and the growth of Protestantism in Belarus.
