= Artūras Dubonis =

Lithuanian historian, academic (born 1962)

Artūras Dubonis (born July 23, 1962 in Vilnius) is a Lithuanian historian and Doctor of Humanities who works at the Lithuanian Institute of History. His main research interests are: Lithuanian Metrica research and publishing, Lithuanian history sources, Lithuanian society in the 13th–16th centuries, Lithuanian foreign policy in the 13th century and the first half of the 14th century.

Dubonis is known for criticism of Litvinism and Litvinistic theories by Belarusian historians such as Mikola Yermalovich and Alexander Kravtsevich which he describes as having nothing in common with the science of history. Dubonis also denies that Novogrudok was once the capital of Lithuania and describes this theory as "parasitic in Belarusian historiography" and "allegedly scientific".
