= Center for Studies of the Culture and History of East European Jews =

Jewish organization based in Lithuania

The Center for Studies of the Culture and History of East European Jews (Lithuanian: Rytų Europos žydų kultūros ir istorijos tyrimų centras) was established in 2004 in Vilnius, Lithuania, to explore the heritage of Jewish national communities in Lithuania and its neighbouring countries. It was founded by members of Vilnius University's Institute of International Relations and Political Sciences, the Lithuanian Institute of History, and the Nadav foundation. The center's programs include international research and educational projects.

== Projects ==
- Lithuanian-language website Žydai Lietuvoje (2006–2007)
- Synagogues of Lithuania. Catalogue in English about 88 synagogues in Lithuania.
- Jews in Lithuania ("Žydai Lietuvoje"), geared towards general public

== Publications ==
- PINKAS. Annual of the Culture and History of East European Jewry Vol. I, II, III
- Conference Proceedings of Central and East European Jews at the Crossroads of Tradition and Modernity, held in Vilnius on 19–21 April 2005.
