= Česlovas Laurinavičius =

Lithuanian historian and political scientist

Česlovas Laurinavičius (born 16 September 1952 in Klaipėda) is a Lithuanian historian and political scientist, In 2003, he was the recipient of the Knight's Cross of the Order for Merits to Lithuania. Since 2001, he has served as the head of the Department of the 20th Century History at the Lithuanian Institute of History.
