= Alfredas Bumblauskas =

Lithuanian historian (born 1956)

- Bumblauskas in 2025
- Born: 18 November 1956 (age 70); Telšiai, Lithuania
- Education: Vilnius University

Alfredas Bumblauskas (born 18 November 1956) is a professor at Vilnius University and one of the best known Lithuanian historians, specializing in the research of the Grand Duchy of Lithuania.

== Biography ==
After graduating from Žemaitė school in Telšiai, he enrolled in Vilnius University in 1974. Bumblauskas received his doctoral degree in 1987, and was mentored by Edvardas Gudavičius. He was formerly dean of the Faculty of History and now heads the Department of Theory of History and Cultural History at Vilnius University. He has sponsored and participated in several TV shows about history and culture (e.g. Būtovės slėpiniai with Edvardas Gudavičius). Bumblauskas has been a visiting scholar at the University of Helsinki, the University of Graz, and the University of Warsaw, and is a member of the editorial board of the Przegląd Wschodni.

He is the author of Senosios Lietuvos istorija 1009–1795 (A History of Old Lithuania: 1009–1795) published in Vilnius in 2005.

In 2014, Bumblauskas claimed that the relations with the Belarusians should be reconsidered (e.g. by establishing counterpropaganda institutions) because of what he called was Belarusian appropriation of the history of Lithuania. Bumblauskas also stressed that Algirdas was the creator of the Lithuanian empire who annexed large parts of modern-day Belarus and Ukraine.

== Awards and prizes ==
- Presented with the Lithuanian National Prize for Culture and Arts, 1998
- The Knights's Cross of the Order of Merit of the Republic of Poland, 1998
- The Officer's Cross of the Order of Merit of the Republic of Poland, 1999
- The Commander's Cross of the Order of Merit of the Republic of Poland, 2009
- Presented with the Simonas Daukantas prize, Lithuania, 1999
- The Knight's Cross of the Order of Vytautas the Great, Lithuania, 2003
- The Commander's Cross of the Order of the Crown, Belgium, 2006
- Order of Orange-Nassau, Netherlands, 2008
