= Letters from Beneath the Gallows =

1864 letters by Konstanty Kalinowski

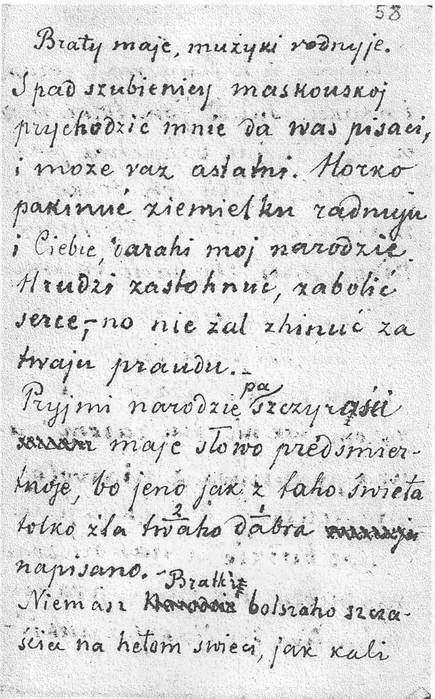
The second letter

The Letters from Beneath the Gallows (Note: Also Letter from Beneath the Gallows, Letters from the Gallows, or other similar names.) (Belarusian: Лісты з-пад шыбеніцы, romanized: Listy z-pad šybienicy (Note: Also Belarusian: Пісьмы з-пад шыбеніцы, romanized: Pismy z-pad šybienicy)) are two letters written by Belarusian and Polish revolutionary Konstanty Kalinowski shortly before his public execution by Russian authorities. The contents of the letters call on Belarusians to resist the Russian Empire to the greatest extent possible, including through military action. Since Kalinowski's death, the letters have become a defining text of Belarusian nationalism.

== Contents ==
The Letters from the Beneath the Gallows were written in a patriotic tone, calling on Belarusians to resist the Russian Empire by any means. In the first letter, Kalinowski criticises the concept of the All-Russian nation and calls for unity between Jews (referred to by Kalinowski in the letters as "the brother" (Note: Belarusian: брат, romanized: brat)) and Belarusians, criticising pogroms and antisemitism as driving Jews to oppose the restoration of the Polish–Lithuanian Commonwealth. He proceeds to express his view that separating Belarus from Russia is an urgent matter, stating that derussification will be difficult the longer the Russian Empire rules over the former Commonwealth. Citing the Polish–Ottoman Wars as a historical example of Belarusians supporting Poland, Kalinowski writes, "As our parents two hundred years ago already said, 'If you have God and His commandments in your heart, help thy neighbour'". (Note: Belarusian: Двесці лет таму назад, а бацькі нашы ляпей ужэ казалі: "Калі маеш Бога ў сэрцу і прыказ Яго, памагай бліжнему"[.]) He calls on Belarusians to fight Russia by any possible means, including "a knife, an ax, or poison".

In the second letter, which is significantly shorter than the first, Kalinowski calls on Belarusians to educate themselves, saying that "true science and Moskal slavery do not go together." The alternative to education, Kalinowski claims, is the destruction of Belarusian identity by Russia. His final remarks advocate that Belarusians to go into battle in the event of any Polish uprising, saying:

[...] Go and fight with the whole people for your human and national rights, for your faith, for your native land. For I say to you from beneath the gallows, my people, you will only then live happily, when no Russian remains over you!

== Legacy ==
After Kalinowski's execution, the letters were first published in Paris by Polish politician Agaton Giller, under the title of To the Belarusian People: Konstanty Kalinowski's Letters from Beneath the Gallows (Belarusian: Да беларускага народу. Ліст з-пад шыбеніцы Канстанціна Каліноўскага, romanized: Da bielaruskaha narodu. List z-pad šybienicy Kanstancina Kalinoŭskaha). The letters reverberated throughout the former Commonwealth, particularly in Belarus. The Journal of Belarusian Studies in 1965 described the letters as "in a sense Kalinoŭski's political testament," and the final paragraph of the second letter has become a rallying cry for Belarusian nationalists.

The letters have also had an important impact on Belarusian literature. Particularly since the dissolution of the Soviet Union, the image of the gallows, as well as Kalinowski's life in general, have become an important part of Belarusian poetry.
