= Kenneth Spencer Yalowitz =

American diplomat

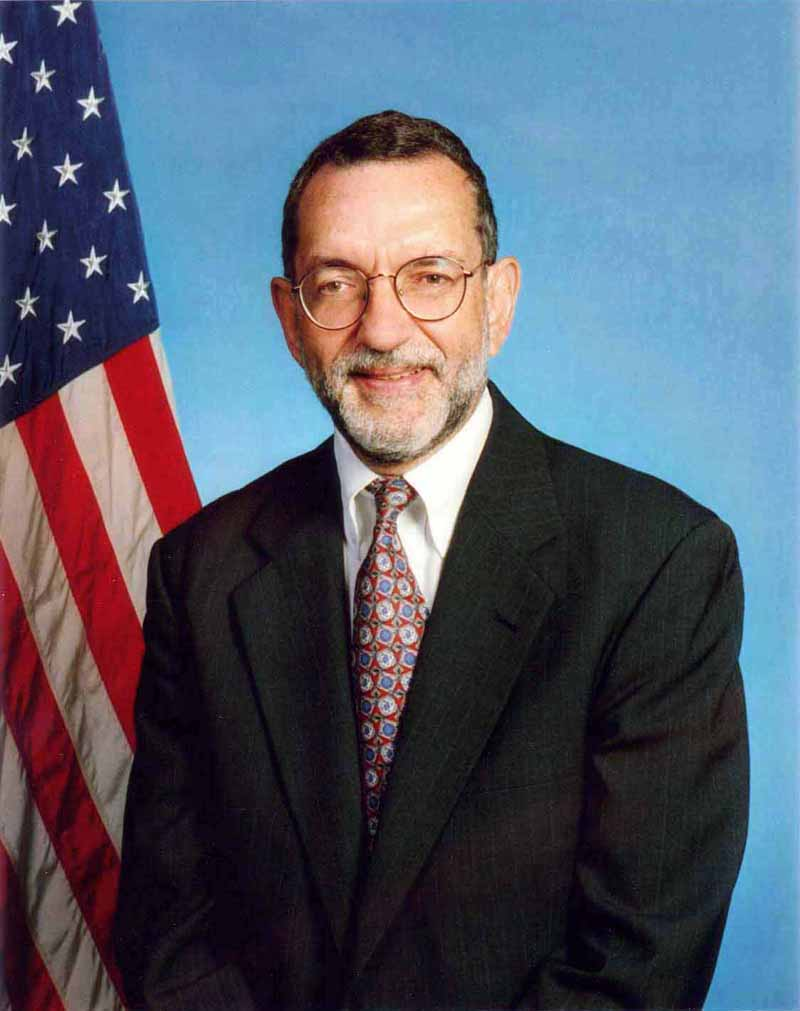
Ambassador Kenneth Yalowitz

Kenneth Spencer Yalowitz (born May 28, 1941) is an American retired diplomat. A Foreign Service Officer, he twice served as a U.S. Ambassador. He most recently served as a Wilson Center Global Fellow.

== Early life and education ==
Yalowitz was born on May 28, 1941, in Chicago, Illinois. He graduated from Columbia University with a M.Phil. and the University of Wisconsin-Madison with a B.A.

== Career ==
During Yalowitz's 36-year career with the Foreign Service, Yalowitz served as Ambassador to Belarus from 1994 to 1997 and Georgia from 1998 to 2001. He received the "Ambassador Robert Frasure award for peacemaking and conflict prevention in 2000 for his work preventing spillover of the Chechen war into Georgia". As an academic, he has served as Director of the Dickey Center for International Understanding at Dartmouth College and as an adjunct professor at several universities including Georgetown University (Director of the Conflict Resolution MA Program) and Washington and Lee University. Yalowitz was elected to the American Academy of Diplomacy in 2009.
