= Grigory Ioffe =

American geographer

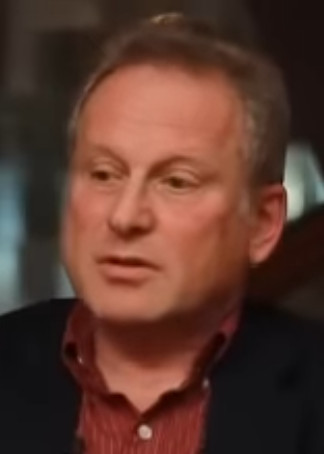
- Ioffe in 2013
- Born: 21 October 1951 (age 74); Moscow, Soviet Union

Academic background
- Education: Moscow State University
- Thesis: A Study of the Influence of Socio-Geographical Factors on Production Outcomes: (Case Study of Agricultural Regions in the Non-Black Earth Zone of the Russian SFSR) (1980)

Grigory Ioffe (born 21 October 1951) is a geographer and professor emeritus at Radford University who focuses on Belarusian history and contemporary politics.

== Biography ==
Ioffe was born in Moscow in a Jewish-Belarusian family with roots in Mozyr on 21 October 1951.

He graduated from Moscow State University in 1974, defended his PhD in geography in 1980, and started to work at the Institute of Geography of the Soviet Academy of Sciences.

Ioffe and his family left the Soviet Union in 1989 for Austria, where they spent a few months. They later moved to Rome, where he was screened by the American embassy. Due to a petition from his former colleagues who had emigrated to the USA earlier, American officials accepted his application.

Ioffe initially moved to Boston, but settled in Radford, Virginia, where he found a university position in 1990 as an assistant professor in the Department of Geography. He was promoted to associate professor in 1994 and to a full professor in 2000. Ioffe became a naturalized American citizen in 1995. As of 2025, he is a professor emeritus at Radford University.

In 2015, Ioffe met with Belarusian President Alexander Lukashenko.

Up to 2024, Ioffe regularly wrote for the Jamestown Foundation. Among his other contributions are articles in Encyclopædia Britannica, the Wilson Center, the Russian think tank Council on Foreign and Defense Policy, and the Kyiv Post.

== Political views ==
Grigory Ioffe stated that Belarusian President Alexander Lukashenko is underappreciated as a politician and that Western media portrayal of Belarus lacks expertise. He claimed that the Belarusian leadership is doing everything possible to preserve the independence of Belarus. Lukashenko especially started to care about it after Putin proposed to incorporate Belarus into Russia as six separate oblasts in 2002. While the Belarusian opposition is suppressed, this is true for both the pro-Russian and the pro-Western factions. Ioffe described Belarus, compared to Ukraine, as a success story.

Later, commenting on the 2020 Belarusian protests, Ioffe said that Lukashenko destroyed the reputation he had tried to build in Western circles after the Russo-Georgian war in 2008 and Russian aggression against Ukraine in 2014. Nevertheless, he claimed that sanctions against Belarus were counterproductive because they pushed Belarus further into Russian orbit. Ioffe also called the Ukrainian and Lithuanian responses to the protests "childish". He argued that keeping Belarus in its sphere of influence is strategically important for Russia, and it is not only appropriate to talk in such terms, but necessary.

== Research ==
=== Books and reviews ===
1. Ioffe, Grigory; Nefedova, Tatyana (1997). Continuity And Change In Rural Russia: A Geographical Perspective. WestviewPress. ISBN 0-8133-8992-5.
  - McCauley, Martin (1998). "Continuity and Change in Rural Russia: A Geographical Perspective. By Grigory Ioffe and Tatyana Nefedova. Boulder, Colo.: Westview Press, 1997. ix, 315 pp. Notes. Index. Figures. Tables. $60.00, hard bound". Slavic Review. 57 (3): 679–680. doi:10.2307/2500757. JSTOR 2500757.
  - Wegren, Stephen (1998). "Review of Continuity and Change in Rural Russia: A Geographical Perspective, by G. Ioffe & T. Nefedova". Europe-Asia Studies. 59 (1): 155–157. JSTOR 153411.
  - Pallot, Judith (1998). "Review of Continuity and change in rural Russia: A geographical perspective, by G. Ioffe & T. Nefedova". Ecumene. 59 (1): 155–157. JSTOR 44252321.
2. Demko, George J.; Ioffe, Grigory; Zayonchkovskaya, Zhanna (1999). Population Under Duress : Geodemography Of Post-soviet Russia (PDF). Taylor & Francis. ISBN 978-0-8133-8939-4.
3. Ioffe, Grigory; Nefedova, Tatyana; Zaslavsky, Ilya (2006). The End of Peasantry?: The Disintegration of Rural Russia. University of Pittsburgh Press. ISBN 0-8229-4295-X.
  - Braden, Kathleen (2007). "Review of The End of Peasantry? The Disintegration of Rural Russia, by G. Ioffe, T. Nefedova, & I. Zaslavsky". Slavic Review. 66 (4): 790–791. doi:10.2307/20060439. JSTOR 20060439.
  - Wegren, Stephen (2007). "Review of The End of Peasantry? The Disintegration of Rural Russia, by G. Ioffe, T. Nefedova, & I. Zaslavsky". Russian review. 66 (2): 345–346. JSTOR 20620565.
  - Moon, David (2007). "Review of The End of Peasantry? The Disintegration of Rural Russia, by G. Ioffe, T. Nefedova, & I. Zaslavsky". Europe-Asia Studies. 59 (8): 1456–1457. JSTOR 20451465.
4. Ioffe, Grigory (2008). Understanding Belarus and How Western Foreign Policy Misses the Mark. Rowman & Littlefield. ISBN 978-14-4224-212-8.
  - Gapova, Elena (2009). "Understanding Belarus and How Western Foreign Policy Misses the Mark. By Grigory loffe. Lanham, Md.: Rowman and Littlefield, 2008. xxiv, 261 pp. Notes. Bibliography. Index. Photographs. Tables. Maps. $85.00, hard bound". Slavic Review. 68 (2): 422–423. doi:10.2307/27697983. JSTOR 27697983.
  - Yalowitz, Kenneth (2009). "Review of Understanding Belarus and How Western Foreign Policy Misses the Mark, by G. Ioffe". Russian review. 68 (1): 173–174. JSTOR 20620977.
  - Bredies, Ingmar (2009). "Review of Understanding Belarus and How Western Foreign Policy Misses the Mark, by G. Ioffe". Europe-Asia Studies. 62 (8): 1408–1410. JSTOR 20787635.
5. Ioffe, Grigory; Goldman, Minton (2011). Russia and the near abroad. McGraw-Hill. ISBN 978-00-7340-147-8.
6. Ioffe, Grigory (2014). Reassessing Lukashenka : Belarus in cultural and geopolitical context. Palgrave Macmillan. ISBN 978-11-3743-674-0.
  - Savchenko, Andrew (2016). "Reassessing Lukashenko: Belarus in Cultural and Geopolitical Context. By Grigory loffe. New York: Palgrave Macmillan, 2014. Xii, 305 pp. Appendix. Notes. Index. Figures. Tables. $105.00, hard bound". Slavic Review. 75 (1): 199–200. doi:10.5612/slavicreview.75.1.199.
  - Marples, David (2015). "Review of Reassessing Lukashenka: Belarus in Cultural and Geopolitical Context, by G. Ioffe". Russian review. 74 (4): 740–741. JSTOR 43662416.
  - Frear, Matthew (2016). "Reassessing Lukashenka. Belarus in Cultural and Geopolitical Context". Europe-Asia Studies. 68 (2): 354–355. doi:10.1080/09668136.2015.1131931.
7. Ioffe, Grigory; Silitski, Vital (2018). Historical dictionary of Belarus. Rowman & Littlefield. ISBN 978-15-3811-706-4.

=== Selected publications ===
- Ioffe, Grigory (2003). "Understanding Belarus: questions of language". Europe-Asia Studies. 55 (7): 1009–1047. doi:10.1080/0966813032000130675.
- Ioffe, Grigory (2004). "Understanding Belarus: economy and political landscape". Europe-Asia Studies. 56 (1): 85–118. doi:10.1080/0966813032000161455.
- Ioffe, Grigory; Nefedova, Tatyana (2004). "Marginal Farmland in European Russia". Eurasian Geography and Economics. 45 (1). doi:10.2747/1539-7216.53.4.527.
- Ioffe, Grigory; Nefedova, Tatyana; Zaslavsky, Ilya (2004). "From Spatial Continuity to Fragmentation: The Case of Russian Farming". Annals of the Association of American Geographers. 94 (4): 913–943. Bibcode:2004AAAG...94..913I. doi:10.1111/j.1467-8306.2004.00441.x.
- Ioffe, Grigory (2007). "Culture Wars, Soul-Searching, and Belarusian Identity". East European Politics and Societies. 21 (2): 348–381. doi:10.1177/0888325407299790.
- Ioffe, Grigory; Nefedova, Tatyana; Kirsten, De Beurs (2012). "Land Abandonment in Russia". Eurasian Geography and Economics. 53 (4): 527–549. doi:10.2747/1539-7216.53.4.527.

== Personal life ==
Grigory Ioffe is married and has two children. Through his wife, the family practices the Eastern Orthodox Christianity.
