= Litvinism =

Theory identifying the Grand Duchy of Lithuania as a Belarusian state

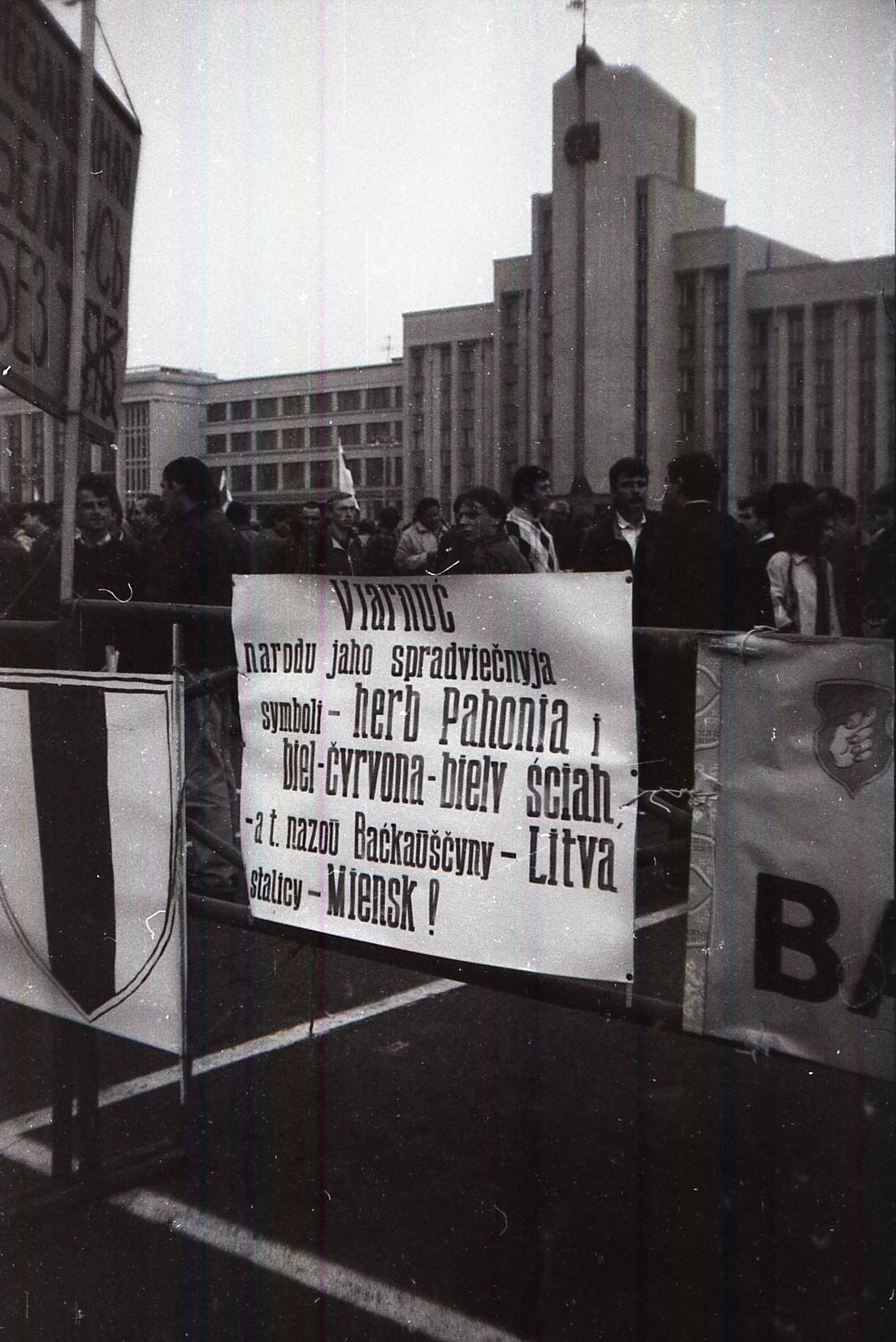
Rally in Minsk on 19 September 1991, one of the posters has the inscription: "Return to the people its old symbols: the coat of arms of Pahonia and the white-red-white flag, as well as the name of the fatherland – Litva, the capital – Miensk!"

Litvinism (Belarusian: літвінізм, romanized: litvinizm) is a term used primarily in Lithuania and by some critics in Belarus to describe a range of historical narratives and political ideas asserting the Grand Duchy of Lithuania (GDL) as a fundamental component of Belarusian statehood and identity. The term lacks a single, universally accepted definition and is often used as a pejorative exonym in political discourse to characterize diverse phenomena—from mainstream Belarusian patriotism and claims to a shared GDL heritage to radical pseudohistorical theories that deny the Baltic origins of the Grand Duchy.

The term itself is rarely used as a self-identifier by proponents of these views. Instead, it is frequently employed by critics, mainly in Lithuania and Russia, as a derogatory label to characterize a wide spectrum of Belarusian historical narratives as revisionist or pseudohistorical. Adherents to these views generally identify simply as Belarusians reclaiming their lost heritage, or as Litvins, viewing the GDL not as a foreign conqueror but as their own historical state.

While radical fringes of the movement claim that the GDL was exclusively Slavic and that modern Lithuanians are historically unrelated to "Litva," mainstream Belarusian historiography views the Grand Duchy as a multi-ethnic, shared heritage of Belarusians and Lithuanians. The ambiguity of the term "Litvinism" has become a significant source of tension between Belarusians and Lithuanians, particularly following the 2020 Belarusian protests and the subsequent migration of Belarusians to Lithuania.

== Terminology and definitions ==
The term "Litvinism" is used loosely in political and para-historical spheres, primarily within the Lithuanian discourse, but it does not have a single interpretation. This semantic ambiguity is cited by scholars as a primary cause of misunderstanding between Belarusians and Lithuanians regarding the legacy of the Grand Duchy of Lithuania. In Lithuania, the term often undergoes "semantic inflation," expanding from the criticism of fringe theories to include any manifestation of Belarusian interest in the GDL heritage, such as the use of the Pahonia coat of arms, the erection of monuments to Grand Dukes in Belarus (e.g., Algirdas in Vitebsk), or the perception of the GDL as a shared state. In Belarus, the term is less common and usually refers to a marginal current of nationalism that advocates for renaming the country to "Litva" (Lithuania) or adopting the demonym "Litvins".

== History ==
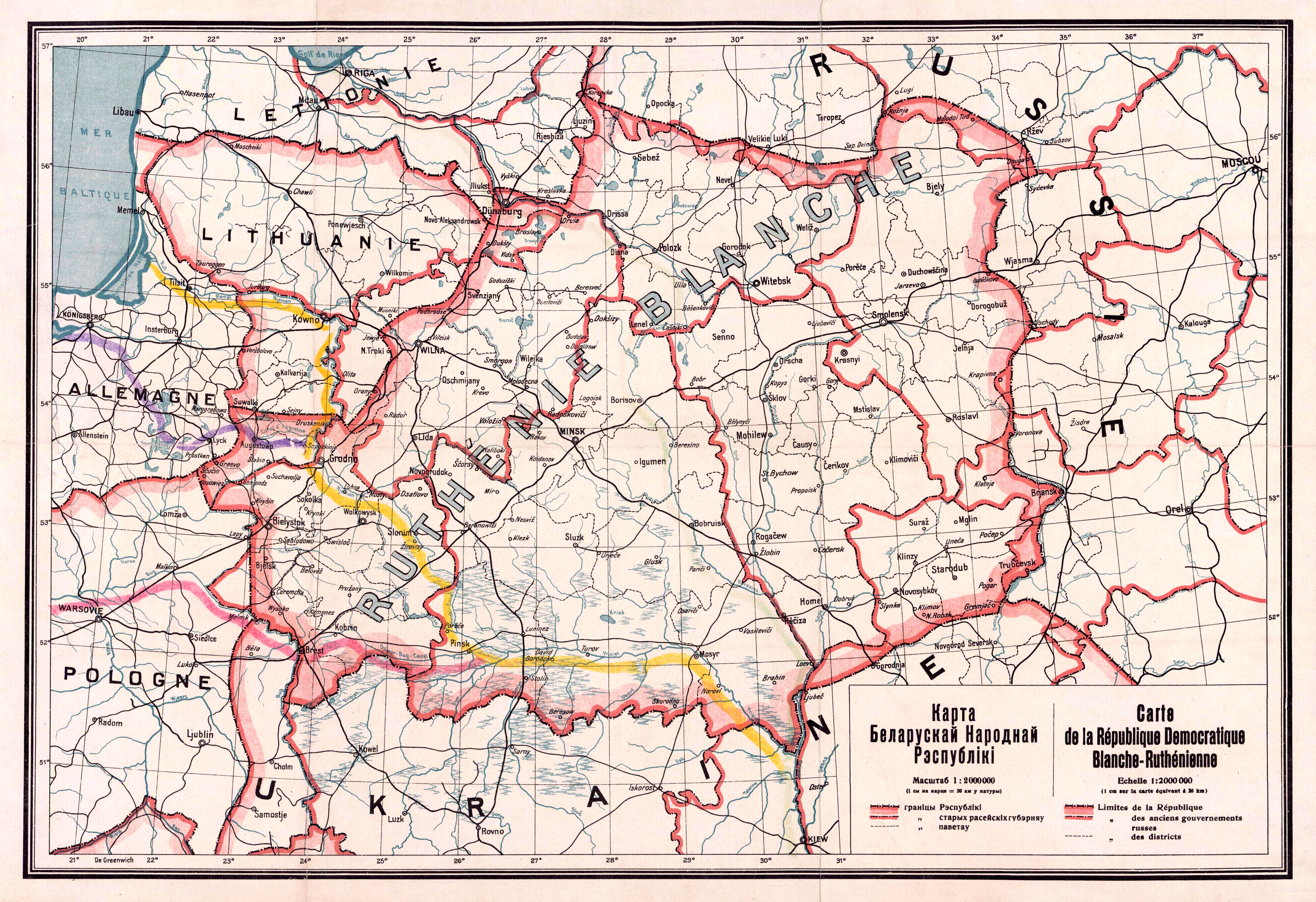
Territory claimed by the Belarusian Democratic Republic in 1918.

=== Early roots ===
Litvinism traces its roots to the early twentieth century and to the process of shaping a modern Belarusian national identity, which often drew on the heritage of the Grand Duchy of Lithuania, emphasizing its Belarusian component. As early as 1919, historians Mitrofan Dovnar-Zapolsky and Usievalad Ihnatoŭski published works using terms like "Lithuanian-Belarusian State." Similar concepts appeared in the writings of interwar Belarusian activists and literators, Soviet-era Belarusian communists, and modern opposition leaders, who often use the narrative to distinguish Belarus from the "Russian World."

=== Mykola Yermalovich writings ===
However, the radical version of Litvinism originates in the essays of the Belarusian teacher and amateur historian Mykola Yermalovich, which were published illegally in samizdat in the 1980s and openly in Belarus in the 1990s. Two of his books were published: In the Footsteps of a Single Myth (1989) and Ancient Belarus (1990). In his writings, he promoted the thesis that the Grand Duchy of Lithuania arose on the territory of Navahrudak, as a kind of continuation of the Duchy of Polotsk, which united the Belarusian and Baltic-Lithuanian lands into a single state. He likewise opposed the theory that the Grand Duchy of Lithuania came into being through the conquest of the Ruthenians by the Balts. Yermalovich also questioned the Slavic character of the Belarusians, promoting the thesis that they were Slavicized Balts.

Yermalovich emphasized the historical independence of Belarus and its distinctness from Russia, for which reason he was harassed by the KGB during the Soviet period. The great popularity of his writings stemmed from the fact that the topic of the earliest history of the Belarusian lands had, on a large scale, essentially not been addressed during the Soviet period. Moreover, official historiography was dominated by the thesis that Belarusians had no independent traditions of statehood prior to the Soviet era.

=== Official Belarusian historiography ===
During the Perestroika period and in independent Belarus, the topic of the Grand Duchy of Lithuania was studied by professional researchers, leading to a process of uncovering and highlighting the Ruthenian element in the history of this state. In the period from 2005 to 2020, the Belarusian dictator Alexander Lukashenko, who had previously rejected the heritage of the Grand Duchy of Lithuania, began emphasizing it in an effort to move closer to the EU, renovating castles and palaces from that era and erecting monuments to Lithuanian rulers. However, after the protests of 2020, he changed his historical policy. At that point, persecutions of historians studying the Grand Duchy of Lithuania and of Litvinists began.

=== Emergence of radical Litvinism ===
Radical litvinism emerged in the intellectual climate of uncovering the Belarusian heritage of the Grand Duchy of Lithuania, generally exaggerating it and appropriating it. In the writings of radical Litvinists, modern Lithuanians were said to be descendants of the Samogitians, who allegedly never formed their own state, and the Grand Duchy of Lithuania is presented as purely Belarusian state. Vilnius and the Vilnius Region were also often described as purely Belarusian lands. In this narrative, modern Lithuanians were said to be descendants of the Samogitians, who allegedly never formed their own state. Many of them refer to themselves as "Lithuanian", (Litvini in Belarus) arguing that this name has always referred to the Slavic population. An example of such an interpretation is the historian Jan Lyalevich, who, in support of this thesis, cites the fact that in Old Belarusian, in the Grand Duchy of Moscow, it was referred to as "Lithuanian." One of the most prominent popularizers of these theories was the author of widely read books, Ales Bely.

Today, Litvinism, although it occasionally finds its way into the mainstream of public discourse in Belarus, does not have many supporters. These views are generally rejected by academic historians but have gained some traction in online communities and pseudo-historical literature. Conversely, the Government of Lithuania views the radical strands of this ideology as a potential threat to territorial integrity and historical identity.

== Criticism ==
The historical narrative of radical Litvinism faces strong opposition from mainstream historians in Lithuania, Poland, and Russia, as well as from Western academics. Critics characterize the radical strands of the theory as pseudohistory, arguing that it relies on selective interpretation of sources, ignores the linguistic reality of the Baltic tribes, and projects modern national identities onto medieval polities.

=== Lithuania ===
The reception of Belarusian historical narratives in Lithuania is largely negative and often does not distinguish between the moderate (shared heritage) and radical (exclusive claim) positions.

A significant part of the Lithuanian political elite and society perceives Belarusian claims to the Grand Duchy of Lithuania (GDL) heritage, including the use of the Pahonia (Vytis) coat of arms, as a manifestation of "Litvinism" and a potential threat to Lithuanian national identity and security. Public figures have expressed concern over the appropriation of national symbols. In February 2025, a group of 67 Lithuanian historians and public figures issued an open letter condemning the use of the Vytis (Pahonia) in contexts that deny its Baltic origins. They argued that while the symbol is shared, the Litvinist interpretation attempts to erase the Lithuanian contribution to the Grand Duchy entirely.

Lithuanian historians reject the claim that the Grand Duchy of Lithuania was a Slavic state, emphasizing the Baltic origin of its ruling dynasty and core population, confirmed by the etymology of names and by sources showing the widespread use of the Lithuanian language by the ruling elite.

Since the 2020s, Lithuanian officials have characterized radical Litvinism not merely as a historical opinion but as a form of "hybrid warfare" potentially exploited by hostile foreign intelligence services. The State Security Department of Lithuania (VSD) warned in 2023 that Litvinist narratives denying the legitimacy of the Lithuanian state could be used to stoke ethnic tensions or justify territorial revanchism regarding Vilnius.

When Belarusian opposition put forth the new Belarus passport project, the fact that the cover of the proposed passport uses the Pahonia symbol caused sharp criticism among Lithuanian nationalists, who consider it a misappropriation of the Lithuanian Vytis, especially in the context of the Litvinism controversy. They sent an open letter to the Seimas and the President of Lithuania to this end, calling against the official recognition of the new Belarus passport. In January 2025 the Seimas concluded that this passport is a symbolic document, not to be officially accepted in Lithuania.

=== Russia ===
While Litvinism is often anti-Russian in its political orientation, seeking to separate Belarus from the "Russian World", it is also opposed by traditional Russian historiography. Russian ideologues, following the 19th-century Imperial tradition, view the Grand Duchy not as a Belarusian or Lithuanian state, but as a "Western Russian" state that competed with Muscovy for the unification of the Rus' lands. From this perspective, Litvinism is viewed as a separatist ideology fostered by Poland or the West to artificially sever the Belarusian people from their "all-Russian" identity.

Russian imperial historiography often aligns with Litvinism in denying the Baltic character of the GDL, framing the state as a Slavic entity. However, rather than viewing it as a distinct Belarusian project, Russian historians often portray it as a failed rival to Moscow that was reabsorbed by the Russian Empire.

== See also ==
- Coat of arms of Lithuania
- Belarusian nationalism
- Belarusian national revival
- Lithuanian national revival
- Ethnographic Lithuania
- Lithuanians in Belarus
- Polesie (association)
- Russification of Belarus

== Bibliography ==
- Dubonis, Artūras (2005). "Saldus lietuvių gyvenimas "svetimu pasu"" (PDF). Naujasis Židinys-Aidai (in Lithuanian).
- Gordziejew, Jerzy (2025). ""Na rozdrożu myśli": białoruski spór o historię w okresie pieriestrojki" [„At the Crossroads of Thought”: the Belarusian dispute over history during the Perestroika period] (PDF). Studia z Dziejów Rosji i Europy Środkowo-Wschodniej. 60: 205–229. doi:10.12775/SDR.2025.1.08.
