= Zigmantas Kiaupa =

Lithuanian historian (born 1942)

- Born: 29 June 1942 (age 84); Pakiaunis
- Education: Vilnius University

Zigmantas Kiaupa (29 June 1942 in Pakiaunis village near Ignalina) is a Lithuanian historian, archivist, and professor. His specialty is political history of the Grand Duchy of Lithuania, history of cities and city dwellers, and study of historical sources.

== Important works ==
- Instrukcijos feodalinių valdų administracijai Lietuvoje XVII–XIX a, 1985.
- Šiauliai XV–XVIII a.: Lietuvos mažujų miestų raidos problemos (Ph.D. thesis), 1993.
- Lietuvos istorija iki 1795 m. (together with J. Kiaupienė and A. Kuncevičius),1995, (reissued in 1998); translated into English as The History of Lithuania before 1795, 2000.
- The History of Lithuania, 2000.
- Lietuvos valstybės istorija, 2004.
