= Edvardas Gudavičius =

Lithuanian historian (1929–2020)

- Born: 6 September 1929; Kaunas, Lithuania
- Died: 27 January 2020 (aged 90); Vilnius, Lithuania
- Education: Kaunas University of Technology; Vilnius University

Edvardas Gudavičius (6 September 1929 – 27 January 2020) was a Lithuanian historian. He was known as one of the best historians in Lithuania specializing in the early history of Grand Duchy of Lithuania and is an author of many publications.

== Biography ==
In 1953, he graduated from Kaunas Polytechnic Institute with a degree in engineering. Gudavičius started his career as a mechanic at one of the factories in Kaunas, but in 1958 moved to Vilnius. In 1962, he enrolled at Vilnius State University of Vincas Kapsukas, seeking a degree in history. In 1991, he earned the title of professor. He was a full member of Lithuanian Academy of Sciences.

To the wider public, he was mostly known for his work together with Alfredas Bumblauskas on the long-running TV show Būtovės slėpiniai, a talk show dedicated to topics of the history of Lithuania. Gudavičius was a frequent contributor to various reference works, including the 25-volume Visuotinė lietuvių enciklopedija. He also published works on the Statutes of Lithuania.

== Dissertations ==
The grave of Edvardas Gudavičius at the Antakalnis cemetery

* 1971 Lithuanian serfage process and its reflection in The first Statute

- 1989 Lithuania in the Balts' war against German aggression in 13th century

== Publications ==
- Žymenys ir ženklai Lietuvoje XII-XX a., Vilnius, 1981, 131 p.
- Pirmasis Lietuvos Statutas (together with Stanislovas Lazutka), Vilnius, 1983, t. 1, d. 1: Paleografinė ir tekstologinė nuorašų analizė; Vilnius, 1985, t. 1, d. 2: Dzialinskio, Lauryno ir Ališavos nuorašų faksimilės; Vilnius, 1991, t. 2, d. 1: Tekstai senąja baltarusių, lotynų ir senąja lenkų kalbomis. ISBN 5-417-00548-7.
- Kryžiaus karai Pabaltijyje ir Lietuva XIII amžiuje, Vilnius, 1989, 192 p. ISBN 5-420-00241-8.
- Miestų atsiradimas Lietuvoje, Vilnius, 1991, 95 p. ISBN 5-420-00723-1.
- Mindaugas, Vilnius, 1998, 360 p. ISBN 9986-34-020-9.
- Lietuvos istorija. Nuo seniausių laikų iki 1569 metų, Vilnius, 1999, 664 p. ISBN 9986-39-112-1.
- ----, Vilnius, 2002, 116 p. ISBN 9955-445-55-6.
- Lietuvos europėjimo keliais: istorinės studijos, Vilnius, 2002, 384 p. ISBN 9955-445-42-4.
- Lietuvos akto promulgacijos kelias: nuo Vytauto kanceliarijos iki Lietuvos Metrikos, Vilnius, 2006, 80 p. ISBN 9986-19-913-1.

== Awards ==
Gudavičius received these awards:

- Lithuanian National Prize, 1995
- The Commander's Cross of the Order of the Lithuanian Grand Duke Gediminas, Lithuania, 1999
- The Commander's Grand Cross of the Order of Vytautas the Great, Lithuania, 2003.
