= Mikola Yermalovich =

Belarusian writer and historian (1921–2000)

- Мікола Іванавіч Ермаловіч
- Born: April 29, 1921; Malyja Navasiolki, Minsky Uyezd, BSSR, Soviet Union
- Died: March 5, 2000 (aged 78); Minsk, Belarus
- Education: BSPU
- Occupations: Opinion journalist, literary scholar, writer, historian

Mikola Yermalovich (Belarusian: Ермало́віч Міко́ла Іва́навіч, Mikoła Jermałovič) (April 29, 1921 in Dzyarzhynsk Raion, Minsk Voblast – March 5, 2000) was a Belarusian writer, historian and teacher.

== Biography ==
Ermalovich was born in the village of Maly Novoselki (modern Dzerzhinsky district). He finished a local school and graduated from Minsk Pedagogical Institute in 1947.On graduation he worked as a teacher, school inspector and headmaster. Ermalovich was visually impaired and had to retire at the age of 35. He devoted decades to studying ancient Belarusian chronicles and other primary sources.

== Work ==
Some commentators believe that Yermalovich presented the pseudo-historic conception of Litvinism, which asserts that the Grand Duchy of Lithuania was Belarusian, not Lithuanian. Other professional historians criticized Ermalovich's books as non-scientific, however it is acknowledged that "it was Ermalovich's books that contributed a great deal to the expansion of research in the field of ancient history of Belarus" and "encouraged [Belarusian] academic historians to pursue further studies of the history of the Grand Duchy of Lithuania".

== Resting place ==
Ermalovich is buried in the Old Cemetery of Maladzechna. On his grave on the back of the monument is written: "He loved Belarus…".

== Bibliography ==
Lithuania proper according to Yermalovich

- Dear to Belarusians name (Дарагое беларусам імя, 1970)
- Following in the tracks of one myth (Па слядах аднаго міфа, 1989) (1st edition: ISBN 5-343-00016-9; 2nd edition: ISBN 5-343-00876-3)
- Ancient Belarus: Polatsk and Navahrudak periods (Старажытная Беларусь: Полацкі і Новагародскі перыяды, 1990) (2nd edition: ISBN 985-02-0503-2)
- Ancient Belarus: Vilna period (Старажытная Беларусь: Віленскі перыяд, 1994)
- Belarusian state Grand Duchy of Lithuania (Беларуская дзяржава Вялікае Княства Літоўскае, 2000) ISBN 985-6576-08-3

== Awards ==
- State award of Belarus for his book Ancient Belarus (1992)
- Award of Uladzimir Karatkevich
- Medal of Francysk Skaryna (1993)

== See also ==
- Litvins
