= Lithuanian Institute of History =

Lithuanian research institute

Coordinates: 54°41′25″N 25°15′58″E

- Lietuvos istorijos institutas
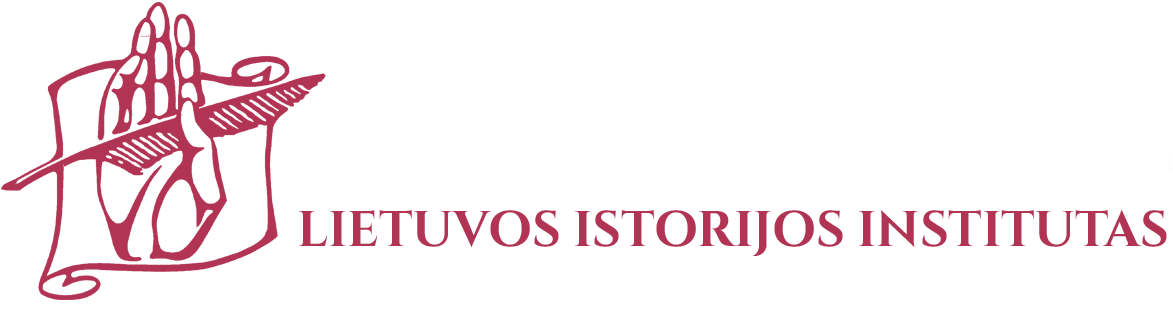

State-funded institute overview
- Formed: 21 June 1991; 35 years ago
- Jurisdiction: Lithuania
- Headquarters: Kražių g. 5, Vilnius, Lithuania
- Employees: 114
- State-funded institute executive: Alvydas Nikžentaitis, Director
- Website: www.istorija.lt

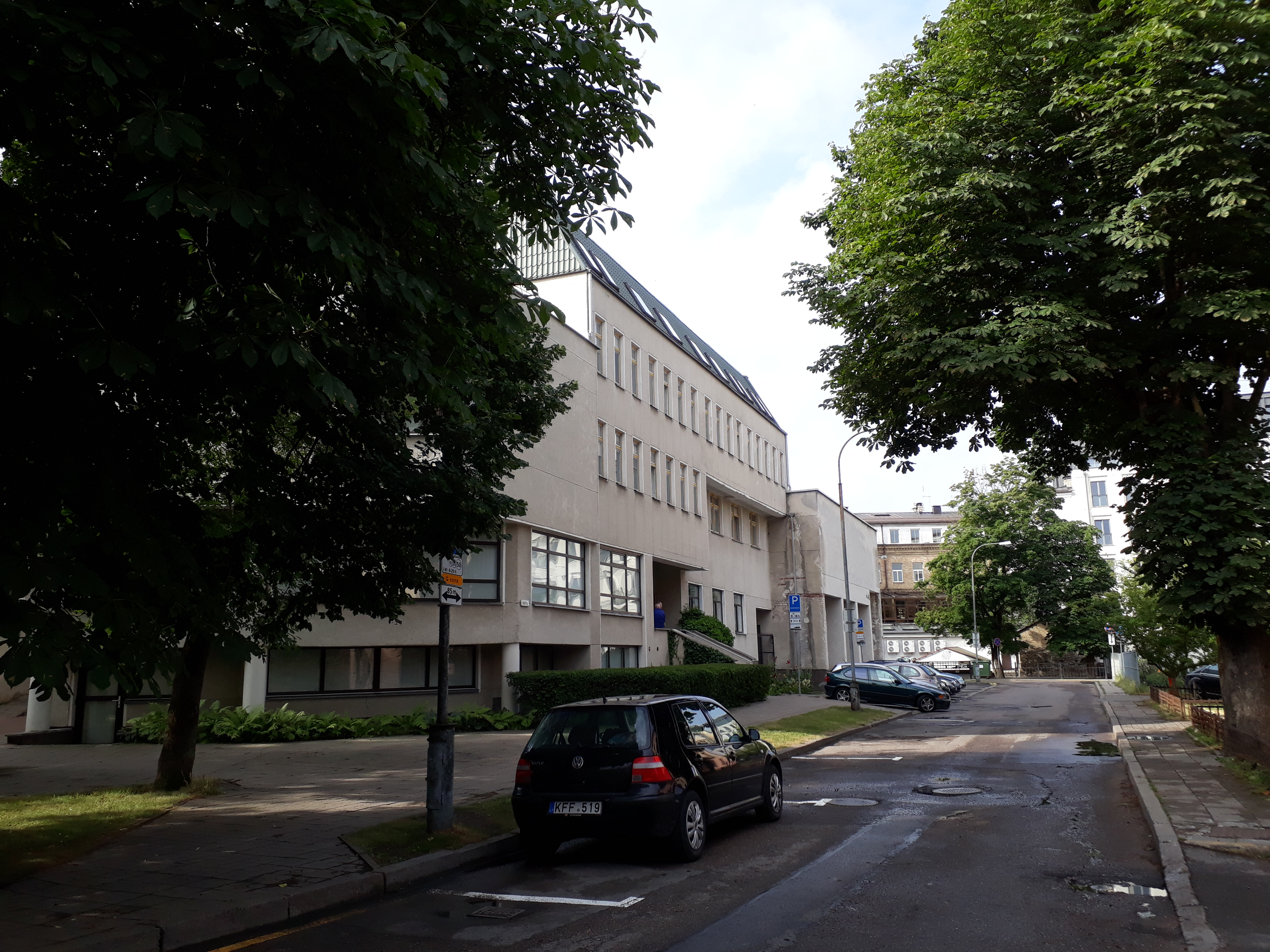
Office of the Lithuanian Institute of History in Vilnius

The Lithuanian Institute of History (Lithuanian: Lietuvos istorijos institutas) is a state-funded research institution in Lithuania. Governed by national law, it is the country's main institution of history research, concentrating mostly on the history of Lithuania and its neighbouring states.

The institute employs 126 people; 64 of them have Ph.D. degrees and 4 are habilitated doctors. Its director is Rimantas Miknys. The institute is divided into 7 sections (archaeology, cities, ethnology, archaeography, Grand Duchy of Lithuania, 19th century and 20th century). It also has its own library, collection of manuscripts, and publishing house. It was established in 1941 as a division of the Lithuanian Academy of Sciences.

As of 2007, the institute was working on 15 projects, main of them is 12-volume academic history of Lithuania. The institute publishes semi-annual journal Lietuvos istorijos metraštis and annual English journal Lithuanian Historical Studies.
