= Lithuanization =

Adoption or imposition of Lithuanian culture or language

Lithuanization (or Lithuanianization) is a process of cultural assimilation, where Lithuanian culture or its language is voluntarily or forcibly adopted.

== History ==
The Lithuanian annexation of Ruthenian lands between the 13th and 15th centuries was accompanied by some Lithuanization. A large part of the Grand Duchy of Lithuania remained Ruthenian; due to religious, linguistic and cultural dissimilarity, there was less assimilation between the ruling nobility of the pagan Lithuanians and the conquered Orthodox East Slavs. After the military and diplomatic expansion of the duchy into Ruthenian (Kievan Rus') lands, local leaders retained autonomy which limited the amalgamation of cultures. When some localities received appointed Gediminids (rulers), the Lithuanian nobility in Ruthenia largely embraced Slavic customs and Orthodox Christianity and became indistinguishable from Ruthenian nobility. The cultures merged; many upper-class Ruthenians merged with the Lithuanian nobility and began to call themselves Lithuanians (Litvins) gente Rutenus natione Lituanus, but still spoke Ruthenian. The Lithuanian nobility became largely Ruthenian, and the nobility of ethnic Lithuania and Samogitia continued to use their native Lithuanian. It adapted Old Church Slavonic and (later) Ruthenian, and acquired main-chancery-language status in local matters and relations with other Orthodox principalities as a lingua franca; Latin was used in relations with Western Europe. It was gradually reversed by the Polonization of Lithuania beginning in the 15th century and the 19th- and early-20th-century Russification of the former Polish–Lithuanian Commonwealth.

A notable example of Lithuanization was the 19th-century replacement of Jews (many Lithuanian Jews, but also Polish Jews), until then the largest ethnic group in Lithuania's major towns, with ethnic Lithuanians migrating from the countryside. Lithuanization was primarily demographic, rather than institutionalized. When Lithuania became an independent state after World War I, its government institutionalized Lithuanization.

=== Interbellum Republic of Lithuania ===
interwar Lithuanian propaganda poster depicting Gediminas' Tower, urging Lithuanians not to forget the lost Vilnius Region

Around the time of Lithuanian independence, the country began moving toward the cultural and linguistic assimilation of large groups of non-Lithuanian citizens (primarily Poles and Germans). The Lithuanian government was initially democratic, and protected the cultural traditions of other ethnic groups; a 1917 Vilnius Conference resolution promised national minorities cultural freedom. After World War I, the Council of Lithuania (the government's legislative branch) was expanded to include Jewish and Belarusian representatives. The first Lithuanian governments included ministries for Jewish and Belarusian affairs; when the Vilnius Region was detached from the country after Żeligowski's Mutiny, however, the largest communities of Belarusians, Jews, and Poles ended up outside Lithuania and the special ministries were abolished. In 1920, Lithuania's Jewish community was granted national and cultural autonomy with the right to legislate binding ordinances; however, partly due to internal strife between Hebrew and Yiddish groups their autonomy was terminated in 1924. The Jews were increasingly marginalized and alienated by the "Lithuania for Lithuanians" policy.

As Lithuania established its independence and its nationalistic attitudes strengthened, the state sought to increase the use of Lithuanian in public life. Among the government's measures was a forced Lithuanization of non-Lithuanian names. The largest minority-school network was operated by the Jewish community; there were 49 Jewish grammar schools in 1919, 107 in 1923, and 144 in 1928. In 1931, partially due to consolidation, the number of schools decreased to 115 and remained stable until 1940.

==== Education ====
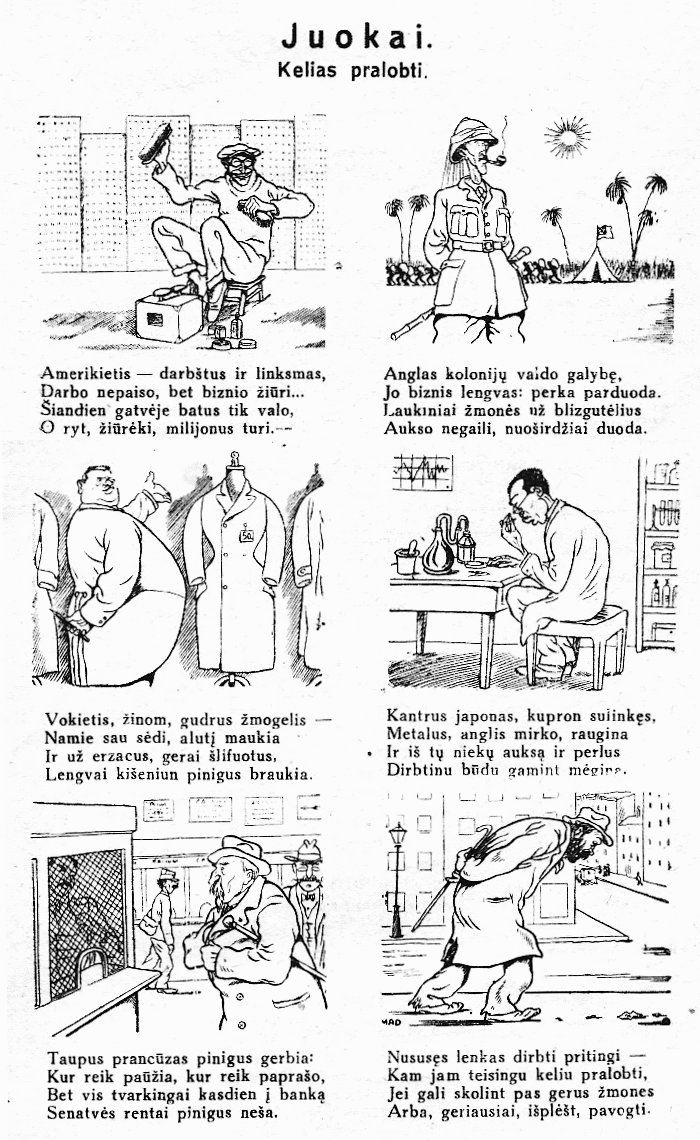
A 1925 anti-Polish cartoon depicting Poles as slackers and thieves

At the beginning of 1920, Lithuania had 20 Polish-language schools for Poles in Lithuania. The number increased to 30 in 1923, but fell to 24 in 1926. The main reason for the decrease was the policy of Lithuanian Christian Democratic Party, which transferred students whose parents had "Lithuania" as their nationality on their passports to Lithuanian schools. After the party lost control, the number of schools increased to 91. Soon after the 1926 coup d'état, nationalists led by Antanas Smetona came to power. The nationalists decided to ban attendance at Polish schools by Lithuanians; children from mixed families were forced to attend Lithuanian schools. Many Poles in Lithuania were identified as Lithuanians on their passports, and were forced to attend Lithuanian schools. The number of Polish schools decreased to nine in 1940. In 1936, a law was passed which allowed a student to attend Polish school only if both parents were Poles. This resulted in unaccredited schools, which numbered over 40 in 1935 and were largely sponsored by Pochodnia. A similar situation developed concerning German schools in the Klaipėda Region.

Lithuanian attitudes towards ethnic Poles were influenced by the concept of treating them as native Lithuanians who were Polonized over several centuries and needed to return to their "true identity". Another major factor was the tense relationship between Lithuania and Poland about the Vilnius Region and cultural (or educational) restrictions on Lithuanians there; in 1927, the Lithuanian Education Society Rytas chairman and 15 teachers were arrested and 47 schools closed.

==== Religion ====
Although the Lithuanian constitution guaranteed equal rights to all religions, the government confiscated Orthodox churches (some of which had been converted from Catholic churches). Former Eastern Catholic Churches were confiscated as well, including the Kruonis Orthodox church. Thirteen Orthodox churches were demolished.

Another target group for discrimination was the Poles; anti-Polish sentiment had appeared primarily due to the Polish occupation of Lithuania's capital Vilnius in 1920. Lithuanian Catholic priests (derogatorily called Litwomans in Polish) promoted Lithuanian in equal terms to Polish, which in many places had been used forced onto the locals by Polish Church authorities. It was often the case, that the parish was inhabited by Lithuanian-speaking people, yet they knew their prayers only in Polish, as the priests tried Polonizing them. Eugeniusz Romer (1871–1943) noted that the Lithuanian National Revival was positive in some respects, he described some excesses, which he found often to be funny, although aggressive towards Poles and Polish culture. For example, Lithuanian priests were forced to drive out of confessional boxes people who wanted to confess in Polish or refused to sing Polish songs that were sung in those churches for centuries during additional services, preferring Lithuanian instead.

Anti-Polish propaganda was sponsored by the government; during the interwar period, caricatures and propaganda were published attacking Poles and depicting them as criminals or vagabonds.

==== Surnames ====
During the interwar, discussions started about returning to native Lithuanian surnames, as opposed to Germanization and Slavicisation (which included both Russification and Polonization). These talks resulted in a draft law to this end, which was submitted to the Seimas in 1939, but not accepted as insufficiently prepared. A special commission "Pavardžių atlietuvinimo komisija" (Commission for the Re-Lithuanianization of Surnames) was set up. Because of the talks on the issue, even though the law did not pass, many Lithuanians re-Lithuanianized their names themselves. Common approaches were to cut out the Slavic part of the suffix, e.g., "Kunčius" from "Kuncevičius" (equivalent of Polish Kuncewicz) or replace a Slavic suffix with the matching Lithuanian one: Antanaitis from Antanavičius (Polish: Antonowicz).

== Modern Lithuania ==
In modern Lithuania, which has been independent since the dissolution of the Soviet Union, Lithuanization is not an official state policy. It is advocated by groups such as Vilnija, however, whose activities create tension in Polish-Lithuanian relations. The former minister of education and science of Lithuania, Zigmas Zinkevičius, stated that the Polish minority inhabiting the Vilnius region is composed of "Polonized Lithuanians" who "are incapable of understanding where they truly belong" and it is "every dedicated Lithuanian's duty" to re-Lithuanize them. Lithuanization promoted the cooperation of Polish and Russian minorities, who support the Electoral Action of Poles in Lithuania.

The Law on Ethnic Minorities, which remained in force until 2010, enabled bilingual signage in areas that have "substantial numbers of a minority with a different language". After the termination of its validity, municipal authorities in Šalčininkai and Vilnius were ordered to remove bilingual Polish-Lithuanian signs, most of which had been placed during the period when such signs were permitted. In 2013, Vilnius regional court fined the administrative director of Šalčininkai District Municipality (where Poles constituted 77.8% of the population in 2011) €30 for each day of delay, and in January 2014 ordered him to pay a fine of over €12,500. Liucyna Kotlovska from Vilnius District Municipality was fined about €1,738. Bilingual signs, even those privately purchased and placed on private property, are now seen by Lithuanian authorities as illegal. The only exception is provided for names of organisations of national minority communities and their information signs. According to the EU's Advisory Committee, this violates Lithuania's obligations under Article 11 (3) of the Framework Convention for the Protection of National Minorities.

A Polish-Lithuanian woman protested when her last name (Wardyn) was Lithuanized to Vardyn. In 2014, Šalčininkai District Municipality administrative director Boleslav Daškevič was fined about €12,500 for failing to execute a court ruling to remove Polish traffic signs. Polish and Russian schools went on strike in September 2015, organised by the Electoral Action of Poles in Lithuania.

== See also ==
- Ethnographic Lithuania
- Lithuania proper
- Republic of Central Lithuania
