= Voruta (newspaper) =

Lithuanian historical weekly newspaper

Voruta is a Lithuanian weekly historical newspaper, founded in 1989 by Juozas Vercinkevičius.

Preparations for publishing Voruta started in 1988 and the first trial issue was published in 1989. Edvardas Gudavičius, Regina Žepkaitė, Antanas Tyla, Arūnas Bubnys, Vincas Martinkėnas, Zigmas Zinkevičius, Nastazija Kairiūkštytė, Stasys Buchaveckas, Kęstutis Makariūnas, Antanas Suraučius, Juozas Vaina, Kazimieras Garšva, Evaldas Gečiauskas among other authors published their works in Voruta.

The newspaper is named after Voruta, a mythical capital of the Lithuania established in the time of King Mindaugas in the 13th century.

== Criticism ==
The newspaper has been noted for leaning towards nationalistic and anti-Polish bias, particularly in the early 1990s, but later its tone changed to a more neutral one.

Its past editors included the leader of the Lithuanian cultural organization Vilnija, Kazimieras Garšva.
