= Voruta (disambiguation) =

Voruta is a purported historical capital of Lithuania.

Voruta may also refer to:

- Voruta (newspaper), a Lithuanian historical weekly newspaper
- Voruta, a traditional dance troupe at Vilnius College
- Voruta, a simple data access framework for Java

== See also ==
- Vorkuta
