= Tutejszy =

Former rural self identification in eastern Europe

Tutejszy (Note: Belarusian: тутэйшы, romanized: tutejšy; Polish: tutejszy, Polish pronunciation: [tuˈtɛjʂɨ]; Lithuanian: tuteišiai; Latvian: tuteiši; Russian: тутешный, romanized: tuteshny; Ukrainian: тутешній, romanized: tuteshniy) was a self-identification of Eastern European rural populations, who did not have a clear national identity. The term means "from here", "local" or "natives". Linguistically, the term is closely associated with speakers of the so-called prostaya mova ('simple speech'), an uncodified vernacular based on Belarusian dialects with influences from Polish, Russian, and Lithuanian.

This phenomenon was mostly present in mixed-lingual Eastern European areas, including Belarus, Poland, Ukraine, Lithuania, and Latvia, in particular, in Polesia and Podlachia. As a self-identification, it persisted in Lithuania’s Vilnius Region into the late 20th century. For example, in 1989, a poll of persons whose passports recorded their ethnicity as Polish revealed that 4% of them regarded themselves as tuteišiai, 10% as Lithuanians, and 84% as Poles.

== In Poland ==
The term was first used in an official publication in 1922 in the preliminary results of the Polish census of 1921 (Miesięcznik Statystyczny, vol. V). An indigenous nationality (French: Nationalité Indigène; Polish: Narodowość tutejsza) was declared by 38,943 persons, with the vast majority being Orthodox (38,135) and from rural areas (36,729). The Census stated that this category was for "population who could not describe their ethnicity in any other way". This census did not include the Vilnius Region.

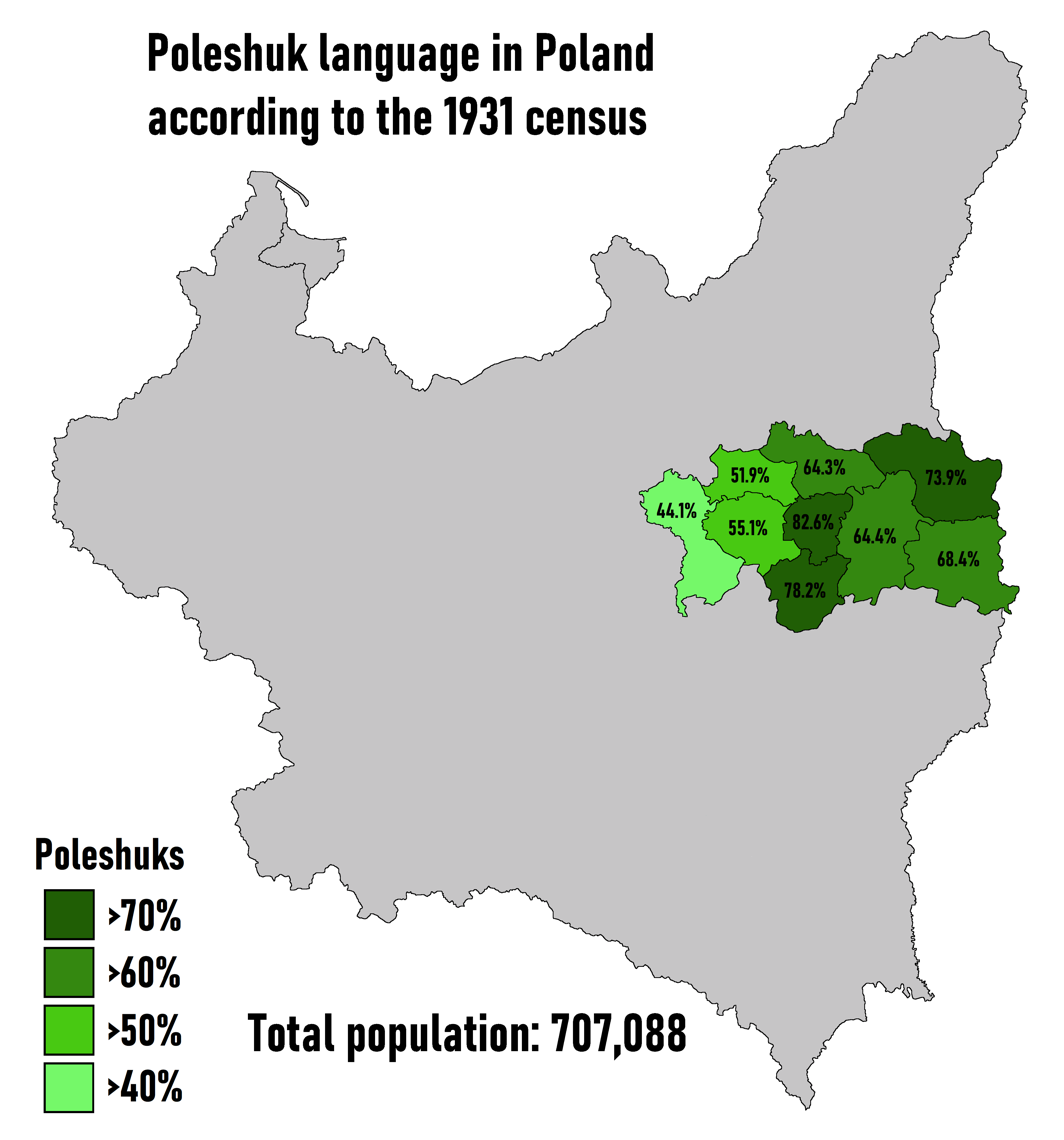
"Tutejszy" (Poleshuk) language in the 1931 Polish census

There are mixed opinions about the reasons, meaning, and implications of this term. In the Polish census of 1931 asked respondents to identify their mother tongue. “Tutejszy” was included and was chosen by 707,088 respondents. Lithuanian researchers assert that within ethnographic Lithuania, the Tutejszy were mostly Slavicized Lithuanians. Björn Wiemer argues that a considerable contribution to Slavicization of the area was a significant influx of Ruthenian (Belarusian) peasantry in the area, especially after considerable depopulation due to plague.

== Modern usage in Lithuania ==
According to research conducted in the early 21st century by ethnologist Yury Vnukovich, the term tutejszy (tuteišiai) is rarely used as a self-identification by the local Slavic-speaking population of the Vilnius Region today. Instead, residents typically identify themselves as Poles, basing this identity on their Catholic faith ("Polish faith"), historical memory, and place of origin, even if they speak the local Belarusian dialect ("Prostaya mova") rather than standard Polish.

In modern Lithuanian discourse, the term has evolved into an external label, sometimes carrying a derogatory connotation similar to "natives" or "indigenes" with a lower social status. It is often used to construct a "liminal" or "hybrid" ethnicity that is neither fully Polish, Belarusian, nor Lithuanian. However, the label "local" ("tutejszy") has also been used by the population to justify their rights to local resources, such as land restitution in the prestigious Vilnius district.

== In Latvia ==
Report on the Latvian census of 1930 describes tuteiši as Catholics of Latgale, who spoke Polish, Latvian and Russian equally and lacked ethnic identity (the Latvian census did not recognize these people as having a separate ethnic identity). The report notes that they could easily change their identity on a whim or after being persuaded by nationalist organizations, producing sharp changes in the ethnic composition of some areas, the most noticeable changes being a decrease in the number of Belarusians in ten years since 1920 from 75,630 to 36,029 and number of Poles increasing more than could be explained with natural growth and immigration, suggesting that some 5,000 Tutejszy had chosen to identify as Poles. In addition, uncertain number of them presumably chose to identify as Russians or Latvians.

== Language ==
The group's speech (język tutejszy, "local language") was described by Björn Wiemer as "an uncodified and largely undescribed Belarusian vernacular".

According to Polish professor Jan Otrębski's article published in 1931, the Polish dialect in the Vilnius Region and in the northeastern areas in general are very interesting variant of Polishness as this dialect developed in a foreign territory which was mostly inhabited by the Lithuanians who were Belarusized (mostly) or Polonized, and to prove this Otrębski provided examples of Lithuanianisms in the Tutejszy language.

In 2015, Polish linguist Mirosław Jankowiak attested that many of the Vilnius Region's inhabitants who declare Polish nationality speak a Belarusian dialect which they call mowa prosta ('simple speech').

== See also ==
- Poleshuks
- Podlashuks
- Kresy
- Krajowcy
- Simple speech

== Bibliography ==
- Budreckis, Algirdas (1967). "ETNOGRAFINĖS LIETUVOS RYTINĖS IR PIETINĖS SIENOS". Karys.
- Korniluk, Marcin (2007). "Ja tutejszy..." Stowarzyszenie "Olszówka" (in Polish). Archived from the original on 2007-09-27.
- Lieven, Anatol (1994). The Baltic revolution: Estonia, Latvia, Lithuania and the path to independence. Yale University Press. ISBN 978-0-300-06078-2.
- Lipscomb, Glenard P. (29 May 1958). "Extension of Remarks". Congressional Record. 104 – Appendix.
- Majecki, Henryk (2012). "Problem samookreślenia narodowego Poleszuków w Polsce okresu międzywojennego" [The problem of national self-determination of Poleshuks in Poland in the interwar period]. МОВЫ CВЕТУ [World's Languages] (in Polish).
- Richmond, Yale (1995). From Da to Yes: understanding the East Europeans. United States of America: Intercultural Press. ISBN 9781877864308.
- Stakauskas, Juozapas (2003). Naujieji nacionalizmai ir Katalikų Bažnyčia Lietuvoje (in Lithuanian). Aidai. ISBN 9955445688.
- Šapoka, Adolfas (2013). Raštai (in Lithuanian). Vol. I - Vilniaus Istorija. Vilnius: Edukologija.
- Zinkevičius, Zigmas (1994). Lietuvių kalbos istorija (in Lithuanian). Vol. VI – Lietuvių kalba naujaisiais laikais. Vilnius.
- Vnukovich, Yury (2023). Маркеры этнічнай ідэнтычнасці жыхароў Віленшчыны (па матэрыялах палявых этнаграфічных экспедыцый пачатку ХХІ ст.) [Markers of the Ethnic Identity of the Inhabitants of Vilnius Region (on the Material of Ethnographic Field Expeditions of the Beginning of the 21st Century)]. Studia Białorutenistyczne (in Belarusian). 17: 65–87. doi:10.17951/sb.2023.17.65-87.
