= Simple speech =

Ukrainian- and Belarusian-language vernacular forms

Common folk speech (Ukrainian: проста мова, romanized: prosta mova; Polish: mowa prosta; Belarusian: простая мова, romanized: prostaja mova), also translated as common folk language or common folk talk, is an informal reference to various uncodified vernacular forms of Ukrainian and Belarusian in the areas historically influenced by Polish culture.

This term has been commonly used, e.g., as a reply to the question about the mother tongue or language spoken at home by the Tutejszy in the historical region of Kresy, which covers parts of modern Ukraine, Belarus, Lithuania and a bit of Latvia.

It also refers to the vernacular form of Ukrainian before its codification ("Old Ukrainian" of 16th–18th centuries). In the 16th century, the chancellery language of the Grand Duchy of Lithuania was Old Ruthenian ("руска мова", commonly called "common folk speech" ("проста мова"). According to Christian Stang, it was based on the Ruthenian dialects of the region around Vilnius.

Also, the Podlachian microlanguage is referred to by locals as "our speech" (Своя мова), "simple speech" (проста мова), or "local speech" (тутейша мова) (cf. "Tutejszy").

The term "common" refers to the speech of "common people", as a distinction from the "high style" of official and written language of the time and region: Church Slavonic in the case of Old Ukrainian of the 16th–17th centuries and the Grand Duchy of Lithuania, and the Polish language in the case of Kresy.

The versions of "simple speech" differ depending on the region.

Polish linguist Mirosław Jankowiak reported in 2015 that most people in rural areas of Vilnius Region who declare themselves as Poles speak Polish-Belarusian "simple speech". He notes that it is difficult to explain the discrepancy between the declared ethnicity and the specifics of language use: the locals can be either Polonized Belarusians, or Belarusianized Poles, or even Belarusianized Lithuanians who later became Polonized. He also notes a linguistic puzzle on how "simple speech" survived without codification and formal education despite 200 years of Russification and tens of years of Polonization.

Jankowiak also notes that Bronisław Taraszkiewicz, who was the first to codify the Belarusian language (1918, "Taraškievica"), hailed from Mačiuliškės of Vilnius region, and it appears that the "common folk speech" native influenced his version of Belarusian to him.

== See also ==
- Tutejszy
- Common people
