= Prostaya mova =

Variety of Belarusian language spoken in Lithuania and Poland

- простая мова
- Region: Vilnius Region (Lithuania), Hrodna Region (Belarus), Podlaskie Voivodeship (Poland)
- Language family: Indo-European: Balto-Slavic; Slavic; East Slavic; Belarusian; Prostaya mova
- Writing system: Cyrillic, Latin

Language codes
- ISO 639-3: –
- Glottolog: None

Prostaya mova (mowa prosta, prosty jazyk; Belarusian: простая мова, literally "simple language" or "simple speech") is a colloquial term used to denote the regional varieties of the Belarusian language (often mixed with Polish, Russian, and Lithuanian elements) spoken in the borderlands of Lithuania, Belarus, and Poland. It is primarily spoken in the Vilnius Region (Lithuania), Hrodna Region (Belarus), and the Podlaskie Voivodeship (Poland) (specifically in the Sokółka County).

Speakers of prostaya mova often identify themselves as Poles (especially in the Vilnius Region) or Belarusians, but refer to their native language as "simple" to distinguish it from standard literary languages (Polish, Russian, Lithuanian, or standard Belarusian).

== Sociolinguistic status ==
The term "prostaya mova" carries a connotation of "uncomplicated," "ordinary," or "common" speech, contrasting it with "complex," "formal," or "official" languages. In the context of the Vilnius Region, these official languages are typically Polish (the language of the church and culture for the local population), Lithuanian (the state language), and Russian (often used as a lingua franca during the Soviet era).

According to ethnologist Yury Vnukovich, the use of the term "prostaya mova" indicates a speaker's rural, pre-modern identity rather than a specific national affiliation. While standard languages serve as markers of ethnic identity (e.g., Lithuanian for Lithuanians, Polish for Poles), prostaya mova represents a "linguistic anomaly" or a "liminal category."

The language is characterized by a low social prestige and is often stigmatized. Speakers may feel ashamed to use it in public spheres such as government institutions, schools, or churches, preferring to switch to "correct" languages (Polish, Russian, or Lithuanian) if they know them. This phenomenon is similar to the situation of other minority languages or dialects that are perceived as "peasant" or "uneducated" varieties.

== Relationship with ethnic identity ==
A unique feature of prostaya mova is that its speakers often do not identify as Belarusians, despite the linguistic basis of their speech being Belarusian dialects.

- In the Vilnius Region (Lithuania): The majority of prostaya mova speakers identify as Poles. For them, the Polish language is a symbol of their national and religious (Catholic) identity, even if they do not speak it fluently in daily life. They may demonstrate their "Polishness" by reciting prayers or songs in standard Polish, while using prostaya mova for everyday communication.
- In the Hrodna Region (Belarus): Speakers may identify as Poles or Belarusians (often depending on their religion: Catholics tend to identify as Poles, Orthodox as Belarusians), but the language remains a shared vernacular.
- In the Podlaskie Voivodeship (Poland): Speakers typically identify as Belarusians or use the regional identity of "locals" (tutejszy).

In the eyes of the local population, the "simple" language does not necessarily contradict a Polish identity. As noted by informants in ethnographic studies, they consider themselves Poles because of their Catholic faith and historical memory, even if they speak "in a simple way" (po-prostomu).

== Linguistic features ==
=== Features of Belarusian dialects in Lithuania ===
Linguistic situation in the Vilna Region at the beginning of the 20th century according to Lithuanian linguist Aloyzas Vidugiris. Pink indicates Belarusian-speaking zones, green — Lithuanian-speaking, yellow — Polish-speaking.

Belarusian dialects in the Vilna (Vilnius) Region are a natural continuation of dialects from the territory of Belarus. Valeriy Chekman, Petras Gaučas, and Laima Grumadienė determined their area of distribution roughly from Buivydžiai in the north to Buivydiškės and Trakai in the west, and to Kalesninkai and Eišiškės in the south of Lithuania. According to traditional division, they belong to the belt of Central Belarusian dialects, and north of Nemenčinė, they approach the North-Eastern dialect. According to the division into dialect zones, they can be attributed to the North-Western zone.

Characteristic features:

- Non-dissimilative akanye and yakanye, although in the north, a transition from non-dissimilative to dissimilative is observed.
- Pronunciation of only hard and hardened r.
- Unstressed я (ya) in place of the old ять (yat) in the endings of the locative case singular of nouns: у ха́ця (u chacia, 'in the house'), у ле́ся (u liesia, 'in the forest'), which indicates full yakanye.
- Use of the lexeme фасоля (fasolia, bean) in the form фасоль (fasol).
- Form of the demonstrative pronoun with prothetic h: гэ́ны (heny, that).
- Form of the infinitive of the verb ісьці́ (iści, to go).
- Use of the past tense participle ending in -вшы (-vshy): сын у шко́лу пае́хаўшы (syn u shkolu payekhaushy, 'the son has gone to school').
- Lexemes that denote objects differently in other regions of Belarus: порткі (portki, 'trousers'), сту́дня (studnia, 'well'), абру́с (abrus, 'tablecloth'), кашу́ля (kashulia, 'shirt').
- Widespread construction of the type мне балі́ць галава́ (mnie balić halava, me [dative] hurts head) instead of у мяне́ балі́ць галава́ (u mianie balić halava, at me hurts head), which is used in other regions.
- Presence of borrowed vocabulary from other languages:
  - Polish (тэ́рас гаво́раць, ён бэ́ндзе; teras havorać, jon bendzie),
  - Russian (маладзё́ж, я харашо́ рабо́тала; maladziož, ja charasho rabotala),
  - Lithuanian (на́ша мокітая < mokytoja 'teacher'; мая́ саска́йта < sąskaita 'bill').

=== Example ===
Comparison of a text in prostaya mova (recorded in the Podlaskie Voivodeship), standard Belarusian, and Polish.

| Prostaya mova (Latin script) | Standard Belarusian (Taraškievica) | Polish |
|---|---|---|
| Maci lubiła hladzieć na maki. Jany raśli bieraham żyta. Lubiła hladzieć na pryrodu, kali prysiadała adpaczyć na łaǔcy pad waknom. Jana zachaplałasa naszym krajawidam. Pad samym waknom było świsłaczanskaja pole (daǔno jaho nima i ni budzia; i naszaho taho wakna nima i ni budzia) i byli tyja maki. Maci piarażyła dźwie wajny i kroǔ baczyła, swaju i czużuju. Ali maki heta maki. Krasata. Mój spicz ja zaczała ad makaǔ, bo czamu nie. | Маці любіла глядзець на макі. Яны расьлі берагам жыта. Любіла глядзець на прыроду, калі прысядала адпачыць на лаўцы пад вакном. Яна захаплялася нашым краявідам. Пад самым вакном было сьвіслачанскае поле (даўно яго няма і не будзе; і нашага таго вакна няма і не будзе), і там былі тыя макі. Маці перажыла дзьве вайны і кроў бачыла, сваю і чужую. Але макі гэта макі. Прыгожасьць. Мой спіч я зачала з макaў, бо чаму не. | Mama kochała patrzeć na maki. Rosły one nad brzegiem żyta. Kochała patrzeć na przyrodę, kiedy siadała odpocząć na ławce pod oknem. Zachwycała się naszym krajobrazem. Pod samym oknem było świsłoczańskie pole (dawno go nie ma i nie będzie; i tego naszego okna nie ma i nie będzie) i były te maki. Mama przeżyła dwie wojny i widziała krew, swoją i cudzą. Ale maki to maki. Coś pięknego. Swoje przemówienie zaczęłam od maków, bo czemu nie. |

== See also ==
- Tutejszy
- Trasianka
- Surzhyk
- West Polesian language

== Bibliography ==
- Внуковіч, Ю. (2023). Маркеры этнічнай ідэнтычнасці жыхароў Віленшчыны (па матэрыялах палявых этнаграфічных экспедыцый пачатку ХХІ ст.) [Markers of the Ethnic Identity of the Inhabitants of Vilnius Region (on the Material of Ethnographic Field Expeditions of the Beginning of the 21st Century)]. Studia Białorutenistyczne (in Belarusian). 17: 65–87. doi:10.17951/sb.2023.17.65-87.
- Barszczewska, Nina; Jankowiak, Mirosław (2012). Dialektologia białoruska [Belarusian Dialectology] (in Polish). Warsaw: Slawistyczny Ośrodek Wydawniczy. ISBN 978-83-89191-14-4.
- Turska, Halina (1982). "O powstaniu polskich obszarów językowych na Wileńszczyźnie" [On the Origin of Polish Language Areas in the Vilnius Region]. Studia nad polszczyzną kresową (in Polish). 1. Wrocław-Warszawa-Kraków: 19–121.
