= Soviet–Lithuanian Mutual Assistance Treaty =

1939 treaty allowing Soviet troops and military bases within Lithuania

The Soviet–Lithuanian Mutual Assistance Treaty (Lithuanian: Lietuvos-Sovietų Sąjungos savitarpio pagalbos sutartis, Russian: советско-литовский договор о взаимопомощи, romanized: sovetsko-litovskiy dogovor o vzaimopomoshchi) was a bilateral treaty signed between the Soviet Union and Lithuania on October 10, 1939. According to provisions outlined in the treaty, Lithuania would acquire about one fifth of the Vilnius Region, including Lithuania's historical capital, Vilnius, and in exchange would allow five Soviet military bases with 20,000 troops to be established across Lithuania. In essence, the treaty with Lithuania was very similar to the treaties that the Soviet Union signed with Estonia on September 28, and with Latvia on October 5. According to official Soviet sources, the Soviet military was strengthening the defenses of a weak nation against possible attacks by Nazi Germany. The treaty provided that Lithuania's sovereignty would not be affected. However, in reality, the treaty opened the door for the first Soviet occupation of Lithuania and was described by The New York Times as "virtual sacrifice of independence."

== Background ==
=== Pre-war treaties ===
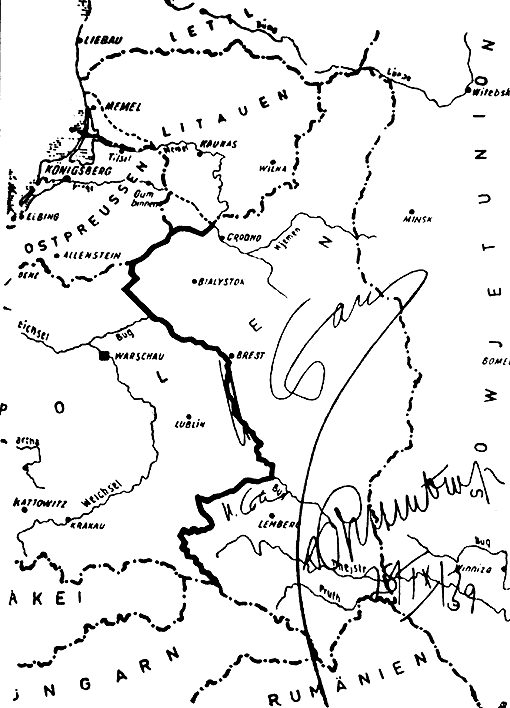
Map attached to the German–Soviet Boundary and Friendship Treaty dividing Eastern Europe into Soviet and German spheres of influence

Lithuania declared independence from the Russian Empire on February 16, 1918. On June 12, 1920, following the Lithuanian–Soviet War, a Soviet–Lithuanian Peace Treaty was signed. The Soviet Union recognized Lithuania's independence and its right to the Vilnius Region. The region was fiercely contested with Poland and fell under its control after Żeligowski's Mutiny in October 1920. It was then incorporated into the Republic of Central Lithuania, which was a short-lived political entity without international recognition. The region was ceded to Poland in 1922 at the Peace of Riga after the Polish–Soviet War and was confirmed internationally by the League of Nations. The Lithuanians refused to recognize Polish control and continued to claim legal and moral rights to the region throughout the interwar period. The Soviet Union continued to support Lithuanian claims against sovereign Poland. The Soviets also supported Lithuania's interests in the Klaipėda Region after the Klaipėda Revolt and signed the Soviet–Lithuanian Non-Aggression Pact in 1926, later extending it to 1944.

On August 23 1939, the Soviet Union and Nazi Germany signed the Molotov–Ribbentrop Pact and divided Eastern Europe into spheres of influence. According to the pact's secret protocols, Lithuania was assigned to the German sphere of influence while Latvia and Estonia, the other two Baltic states, were assigned to the Soviets. This different treatment could be explained by Lithuania's economic dependence on Germany. Germany accounted for approximately 80% of Lithuania's foreign trade and, after the 1939 German ultimatum, had control of Klaipėda, Lithuania's only port. Also, Lithuania and Russia did not have a common border.

=== World War II ===
On September 1 1939, Germany invaded Poland. The Wehrmacht pushed Polish forces behind the line agreed with the Soviets. Germans took control of the Lublin Voivodeship and eastern Warsaw Voivodeship. When, on September 17, the Red Army invaded Poland, Soviet troops took over the Vilnius Region, which, according to the 1920 and 1926 Soviet–Lithuanian treaties, was recognized as Lithuanian. As a result, Soviets and Germans re-negotiated the secret protocols of the Molotov–Ribbentrop Pact. On September 28 1939, they signed the Boundary and Friendship Treaty. Its secret attachment detailed that to compensate the Soviet Union for German-occupied Polish territories, Germany would transfer Lithuania, except for a small territory in Suvalkija, to the Soviet sphere of influence. The exchange of territories was also motivated by Soviet control of Vilnius; the Soviet Union could exert significant influence on the Lithuanian government, which claimed Vilnius to be its de jure capital. In the secret protocols, both Soviet Union and Germany explicitly recognized Lithuanian interest in Vilnius.

== Negotiations ==
=== Initial stance ===
On September 29, the day after the Boundary and Friendship Treaty, Germany canceled planned talks with Lithuania and the Soviet Union informed Lithuania that it wished to open negotiations regarding future relationship between the two countries. The new Soviet–Lithuanian negotiations were supposed to formally resolve the status of the Vilnius Region. Lithuanian Minister of Foreign Affairs Juozas Urbšys arrived in Moscow on October 3 to meet with Soviet leaders. During the meeting, Joseph Stalin personally informed Urbšys about the Soviet–German secret protocols and showed maps of the spheres of influence. He demanded that Lithuania sign three separate treaties, according to which:

1. Soviet military bases would be established in Lithuania and up to 50,000 Soviet soldiers would be stationed there (the original mutual assistance pact);
2. Lithuanian territory west of the Šešupė River would be ceded to Nazi Germany (as agreed between Germany and Soviet Union in the Boundary and Friendship Treaty);
3. One portion of the Vilnius Region would be attached to Lithuania.

Urbšys protested the Soviet bases, arguing that it would mean virtual occupation of Lithuania. The Soviets argued that their army would protect Lithuania from possible attacks from Nazi Germany and that a similar treaty was already signed with Estonia. Urbšys argued that Lithuania's neutrality was enough to guarantee its security and proposed to strengthen the Lithuanian army. According to Lithuanian brigadier general Musteikis, who accompanied him, Urbšys said that Lithuania refused to annex the Vilnius Region as well as rejecting the Soviet garrisons. Stalin, though nervous, replied "No matter if you take Vilnius or not, Soviet troops will enter Lithuania anyway." Finally, the Soviets agreed to reduce the number of troops to 35,000. Urbšys then also bargained for more territories in the Vilnius Region, especially in the vicinity of Druskininkai and Švenčionys, territories with larger Lithuanian populations. The Soviets replied that the boundary drawn by the 1920 peace treaty was inaccurate and that Belarusians also laid claims to the territory. The Soviets tentatively agreed that territories where a Lithuanian majority could be proven would be transferred to Lithuania. Nevertheless, the Soviets threatened the Lithuanians that if they will not accept the Mutual Assistance Treaty, Vilnius will be attached to the Byelorussian Soviet Socialist Republic. The most shocking demand was to cede Lithuanian territory to Germany. Lithuania decided to postpone any negotiations regarding territory transfer to Germany until Germany expressed clear demands.

=== Acceptance ===
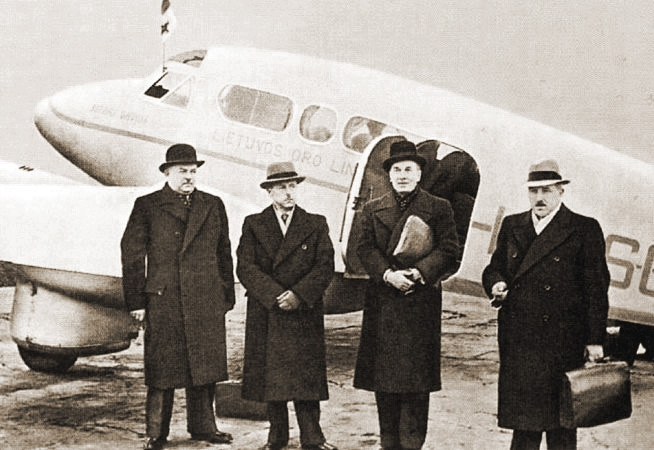
Lithuanian delegation before departing to Moscow on October 7, 1939. Urbšys is third from left.

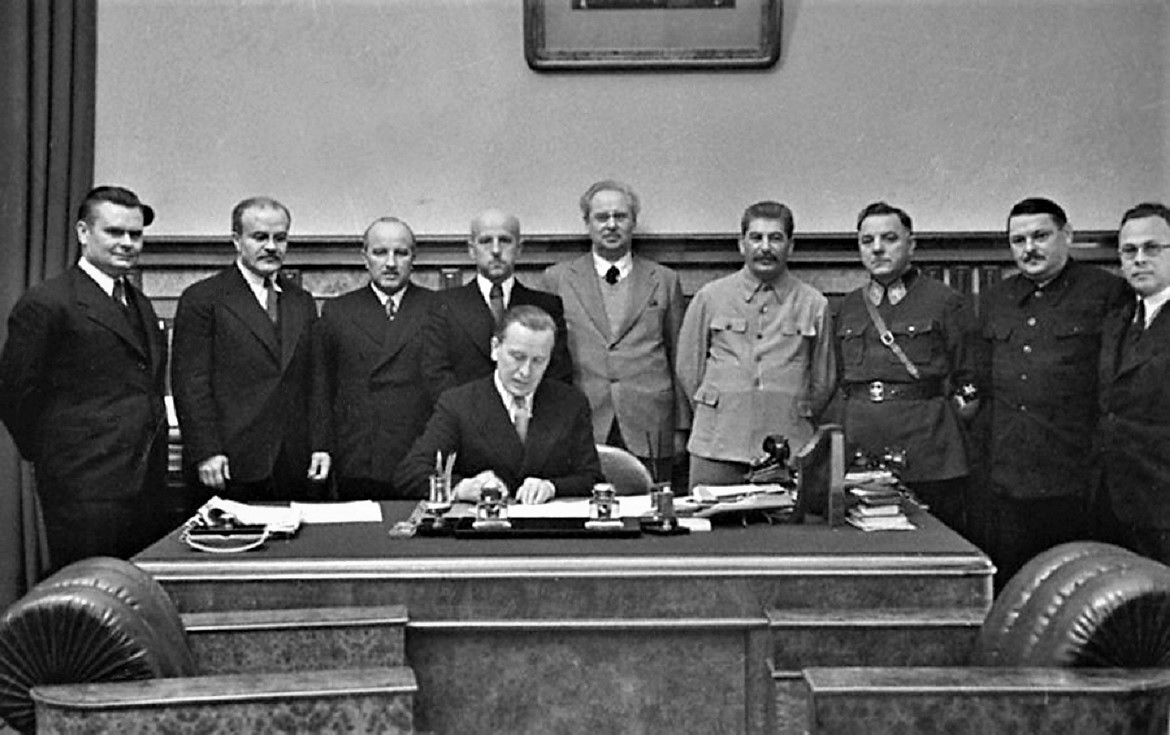
Urbšys signing the treaty.

Urbšys returned to Lithuania to consult the government. German officials confirmed that the secret protocols were real, and informed Lithuanians that transfer of the territory in Suvalkija was not an urgent matter. Eventually, Nazi Germany sold this territory to the Soviet Union for 7.5 million dollars on January 10, 1941, in the German–Soviet Border and Commercial Agreement. Lithuanians in principle agreed to sign the mutual assistance treaty, but were instructed to resist Soviet bases as much as possible. Alternatives included doubling the Lithuanian army, exchanging military missions, and building fortifications on the western border with Germany similar to the Maginot Line in France. On October 7, the Lithuanian delegation, including General Stasys Raštikis and Deputy Prime Minister Kazys Bizauskas, returned to Moscow. Stalin refused the proposed alternatives, but agreed to reduce the number of Soviet troops to 20,000 – about the size of the entire Lithuanian army. Soviets wanted to sign the treaty right then to commemorate the 19th anniversary of Żeligowski's Mutiny and Lithuania's loss of Vilnius. Political rallies organized in Vilnius, demanding the city's incorporation into the Byelorussian Soviet Socialist Republic, put additional pressure on Lithuanians and provided a sense of urgency. Urbšys refused to sign and the talks receded for the second time.

In Lithuania, President Antanas Smetona doubted that it was worth gaining Vilnius for such a price and debated whether the negotiations could be broken off. Bizauskas argued that refusing the treaty would not prevent the Soviet Union from implementing its plan. The Soviet Union had already threatened Estonia with force in the case it refused their mutual assistance treaty and was gathering forces in the Vilnius Region in the east and in Latvia in the north. In such light, the government decided to demand as much territory as possible. However, when the delegation returned to Moscow, it found the atmosphere changed. The Soviets were inflexible, refused further negotiations, and intimidated the delegation to sign the treaty. They presented a new draft, which combined the mutual assistance pact and transfer of Vilnius into one agreement. The Lithuanian delegation had little choice but to sign the proposed treaty. After signing the treaty, Stalin invited the Lithuanian delegation to celebrate and watch two movies with him. Urbšys informed the Lithuanian government about the signing of the treaty only in the morning of October 11 – at the time, the treaty was already published by Soviet news agency TASS.

== Provisions ==
About one-fifth of Vilnius Region (dark orange) was ceded to Lithuania in exchange for four Soviet military bases (marked with stars) according to the Mutual Assistance Treaty

=== Articles of the treaty ===
The mutual assistance treaty contained nine articles:

- Article I: Transfer of Vilnius Region and the city of Vilnius to Lithuania
- Article II: Mutual assistance in case of an attack
- Article III: Soviet Union renders assistance to the Lithuanian Army in terms of munitions and equipment
- Article IV: Soviet Union receives right to station its troops in Lithuania. Base locations are to be decided by a separate treaty.
- Article V: Coordinated actions in case of an attack
- Article VI: Agreement not to participate in alliances against the other party
- Article VII: Sovereignty is not affected by this treaty
- Article VIII: Articles II to VII are valid for a period of 15 years with an automatic extension for another 10 (note that transfer of Vilnius is permanent)
- Article IX: Date of effect

The treaty also had a secret supplement, which specified that the Soviets could station only up to 20,000 of their troops.

=== Location of Soviet troops ===
The treaty did not decide the exact location of the Soviet bases, and an 18-member Soviet delegation, led by Mikhail Kovalyov, was sent to Lithuania to discuss the specifics on October 22. The Lithuanians sought to limit Soviet bases to the Vilnius Region and southern Lithuania, offering Pabradė, Nemenčinė, Naujoji Vilnia, and Alytus. They considered a base in Samogitia (western Lithuania) to be the worst possible outcome. The Lithuanians preferred fewer, but bigger bases with no permanent runways for the aircraft. The Soviets initially proposed to have their bases in Vilnius, Kaunas, Alytus, Ukmergė, and Šiauliai. The final agreement was signed on October 28, the same day that the Lithuanian army marched into Vilnius. A day before, another agreement determined the new border of eastern Lithuania: Lithuania received 6,739 km^{2} (2,602 mi^{2}) of territory with a population of approximately 430,000. The territory comprised about one fifth of the Vilnius Region recognized to Lithuania by the Soviet–Lithuanian Peace Treaty of 1920; the population of Lithuania reached about 3.8 million.

According to the final agreement, four military bases would be established in Lithuania, with 18,786 military personnel from the 16th Special Rifle Corps, 5th Rifle Division, and 2nd Light Tank Brigade. The bases were to be located in Alytus (infantry, artillery, and mechanized units with 8,000 troops), Prienai (infantry and artillery units with 2,500 soldiers), Gaižiūnai (mechanized and tank units with 3,500 troops), and in Naujoji Vilnia (headquarters, infantry and artillery units with 4,500 troops). For comparison, on June 1 1940, Lithuanian army had 22,265 soldiers and 1,728 officers. While aircraft bases in Alytus and Gaižiūnai were under construction, Soviet aircraft were to be stationed in Kirtimai, a neighborhood of Vilnius. The final location of the bases showed that the Soviets were more concerned with encircling Kaunas, the temporary capital, than with defending the country against a possible foreign attack.

== Aftermath ==
=== International and domestic reaction ===
The treaty was presented as proof of Soviet respect for small nations and Stalin's benevolence by Soviet propaganda. Russians emphasized that it was the second time the Soviet Union gave Vilnius to Lithuania while the League of Nations failed to mediate the Polish–Lithuanian dispute. The Soviets also worked to assure Lithuanians that Soviet friendship is effective protection from and a welcome alternative to Nazi aggression. The Polish government-in-exile officially protested the treaty as it did not recognize Russian conquest and claimed sovereignty over territories of the Second Polish Republic. Lithuanians replied that the region was legally part of Lithuania. Poles resented the transfer and as soon as the Soviet Army left Vilnius, anti-Lithuanian riots broke out accusing Lithuanians of betrayal. France and Great Britain, traditional allies of Poland, also condemned the treaty. Belarusian activists who campaigned for Vilnius incorporation into the Byelorussian Soviet Socialist Republic were arrested, deported, or executed by the Soviet authorities. The transfer upset their national aspirations to position Belarus as a successor to the former Grand Duchy of Lithuania. Lithuanian relations with the Vatican were expected to improve as the cause for tension, the Vilnius Region assigned to Poland by the Concordat of 1925, now was under Lithuanian control.

Lithuanian politicians attempted to show the regained Vilnius as a major diplomatic victory. The Lithuanian Nationalists Union, the ruling political party in Lithuania since the 1926 coup, used celebrations of the return of the city to increase its prestige and popularity. The government stressed its competence and the opposition emphasized Soviet generosity. While politicians publicly praised the Soviet Union and flaunted "traditional Soviet–Lithuanian friendship," in private, they understood this treaty was a serious threat to Lithuanian independence. The popular attitude of the time was reflected in a known slogan "Vilnius – mūsų, Lietuva – rusų" (Vilnius is ours, but Lithuania is Russia's). After the treaty was signed, Lithuania lost its neutrality and could not independently execute its foreign policy. For example, Lithuania could not support Finland when the Winter War broke out after Finland rejected a similar mutual assistance treaty proposed by Soviet Union. In international politics, Lithuania became a Soviet satellite.

=== In the Vilnius Region ===
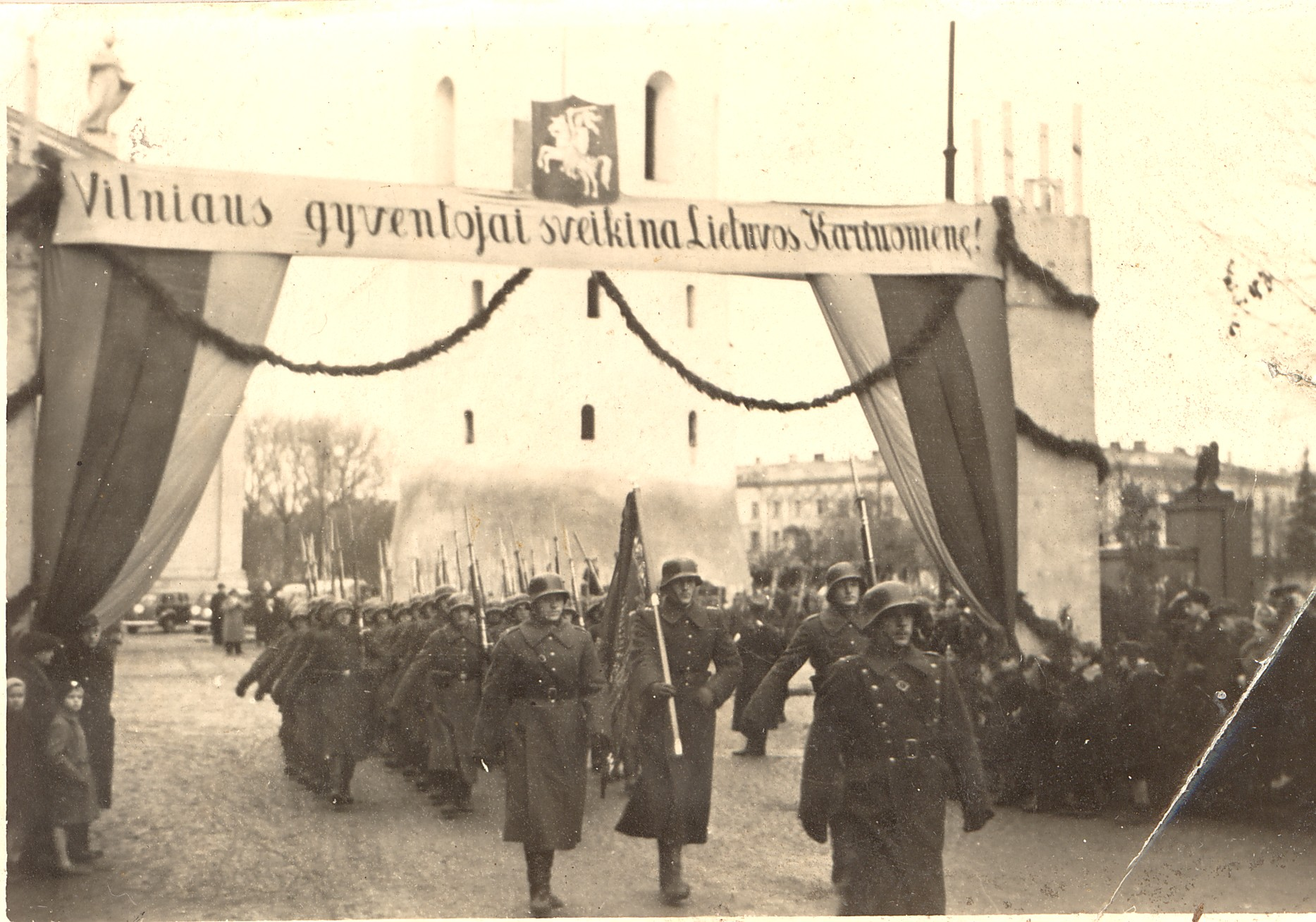
Lithuanian troops enter Vilnius.

External videos
- Documentary for the annexation of Vilnius
- Vilniaus krašto atgavimas / Žygis į Vilnių (1939 m. spalio 27 - 28 d.)

On October 28, the Lithuanian Army entered Vilnius for the first time since 1920. Before handing over the city to the Lithuanians, the Soviets robbed and transported all valuables to the Soviet Union: equipment from factories (including Elektrit) and hospitals, vehicles and trains, and cultural objects from museums and libraries. After the Russian troops left, Polish residents, seeing the deal as a betrayal of Poland, protested against the Lithuanian government. On October 30 – November 1, when the bread price suddenly rose, clashes between local communists and Poles turned into a riot against the Jewish population. Many Jewish shops were raided and some 35 people were injured. Jews accused Lithuanian police of inaction and sympathizing with Polish rioters. Soviet soldiers, uninvited by the Lithuanian government, helped to subdue the riots.

The territory presented an economic challenge to Lithuania; unemployment was rampant, food was in short supply, valuables were stolen by the Soviet army, and war refugees were gathering from other former Polish territories. The Lithuanian army would provide up to 25,000 daily rations of hot soup and bread to residents of Vilnius. The Lithuanian government exchanged the Polish złoty to the Lithuanian litas at a favourable rate, losing over 20 million litas. The Lithuanian government decided to implement a land reform similar to the land reform executed in the 1920s. Large estates would be nationalized and distributed to landless peasants in exchange for redemption dues payable in 36 years. Politicians hoped that such reform would weaken pro-Polish landowners and would win peasants' loyalty to the Lithuanian state. By March 1940, 90 estates and 23,000 hectares were distributed. Lithuanians proceeded to "re-Lithuanize" cultural life in the Vilnius Region. They closed many Polish cultural and educational institutions, including Stephan Batory University with over 3,000 students. Lithuanians sought to introduce the Lithuanian language in public life and sponsored Lithuanian organizations and cultural activities.

=== In Lithuania ===
The future of the Vilnius Region caused frictions between political and military leaders in Lithuania. As the first Soviet troops moved into Lithuania on November 14, the government, which included four generals, resigned. A new civilian cabinet, led by controversial Prime Minister Antanas Merkys, was formed on November 21. Lithuanians were careful to follow the treaty to the letter and not give any excuses for Moscow to accuse them of treaty violations. At first, delayed by the Winter War, the Soviets did not interfere with Lithuania's domestic affairs and Soviet soldiers were well-behaved in their bases. The Lithuanian government started debating its options and what could be done to prepare for the future occupation. Despite various resolutions, nothing material was accomplished. Lithuania had no counterweight to Soviet influence; its own forces were small, Germany was in effect Russia's ally, Poland was conquered, and France and Great Britain had bigger issues in western Europe. After the Winter War was over, the Soviet Union turned its attention to the Baltic States.

After months of intense propaganda and diplomatic pressure, the Soviets issued an ultimatum on June 14, 1940 – the same day as the one where the world's attention was focused on the fall of Paris during the Battle of France. The Soviets accused Lithuania of violating the treaty and abducting Russian soldiers from their bases. The Soviets demanded that a new government, which would comply with the Mutual Assistance Treaty, be formed and that an unspecified number of Soviet troops be admitted to Lithuania. With Soviet troops already in the country, it was impossible to mount military resistance. The Soviets took control of government institutions, installed a new pro-Soviet government, and announced elections to the People's Seimas. The proclaimed Lithuanian Soviet Socialist Republic was incorporated into the Soviet Union on August 3, 1940.

== See also ==
- Soviet–Estonian Mutual Assistance Treaty
- Soviet–Latvian Mutual Assistance Treaty
- Polish National-Territorial Region
