= Vilnija (organization) =

Cultural and political organization based in Lithuania

Vilnija is a Lithuanian cultural and political organization, created to promote and preserve Lithuanian culture in Vilnius region, the Lithuanian name after which the organization is named. The organization has been described as nationalist, extremist, and anti-Polish.

== History and policies ==
The organization was formed in 1988, by Lithuanian cultural and Sąjūdis activists and its primary aim was the preservation of the Lithuanian language and culture in Vilnius region. The organization is mostly composed of ethnic Lithuanians although it was later joined by a token Polish organization, the Association of St. Zita (Stowarzyszenie Św. Zyty). The organization was created by Romualdas Ozolas and has been led for many years by Kazimieras Garšva. Its program, elaborated in a monograph by Garšva, is based on the theory that the big part of the Poles in Lithuania are in fact descendants of Polonized Lithuanians and Belarusians. According to Vilnija members, this made them "ethnic Lithuanians" who should be restored to the nation. To achieve that, organization proposed that they should be forcibly assimilated by removing any trace of Polish textbooks, teachers, symbols and traditions. The organization's goal is also to counter perceived growing Polish influence in Lithuania, which Vilnija sees as a threat to that nation.

== Controversies ==
Vilnija has been seen by Polish government and media to often organize or support anti-Polish actions and the academic works of its leader, the philologist Kazimieras Garšva, have been negatively received by the Polish government and media.

Vilnija takes an interest in the political situation of the Lithuanians of the Vilnius Region. It is critical of the Election Action of Lithuania's Poles party, which it claims discourages the assimilation of the national minorities of Lithuania and constantly tries to present the Polish minority as prosecuted. Valdemar Tomaševski, the leader of EAPL, describes Vilnija as nationalistic.

Vilnija often voices concern about the situation of Lithuanian schools in the areas of Polish minority. According to Vilnija, the local government propagates Polish schools at the expense of Lithuanian schools. Vilnija is also active in the campaign against allowing members of the Polish minority in Lithuania to be able to spell their names with a Polish alphabet in official documents.

== Members and activists ==
Prominent members of the organization include its long-time leader, Kazimieras Garšva, Seimas deputy and organization's founder Romualdas Ozolas, and writer Izidorius Šimelionis. In 2016, Kazimieras Garšva was presented with the Cross of the Knight of the Order for Merits to Lithuania.

During the 1980s and 1990s, the organization's most prominent activists were scientists Zigmas Zinkevičius and Alvydas Butkus, according to Polish historian Barbara Jundo-Kaliszewska.

== Sources ==
- Budreckis, Algirdas (1967). "Etnografinės Lietuvos Rytinės ir Pietinės Sienos". Karys.
- Budryte, Dovile (2005). Taming Nationalism?: Political Community Building in the Post-Soviet Baltic States. Aldershot: Ashgate Publishing. ISBN 0-7546-3757-3.
- Lipscomb, Glenard P.; Committee for a Free Lithuania (29 May 1958). "Extension of Remarks". Congressional Record. 104 - Appendix.
- Šapoka, Adolfas (2013). Raštai (in Lithuanian). Vol. I - Vilniaus Istorija. Vilnius: Edukologija.
- Zinkevičius, Zigmas (31 January 2014). "Lenkiškai kalbantys lietuviai" [Polish-speaking Lithuanians]. alkas.lt (in Lithuanian).
