= Antanaitis =

Antanaitis is a Lithuanian surname, meaning "son of Anthony". Notable people with the name include the following:

- Jonas Algirdas Antanaitis (1921–2018), Lithuanian politician
- Sean Antanaitis, multi-instrumentalist for the American band Celebration (2000s band)
