= Vilnius Region =

Historical region in present-day Lithuania and Belarus

Coordinates: 54°30′N 25°25′E

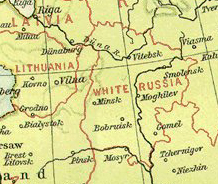
Excerpt from a map of Europe immediately after WWI. Pre-WWI borders are kept in color, while new states that emerged after WWI are presented in with red borders

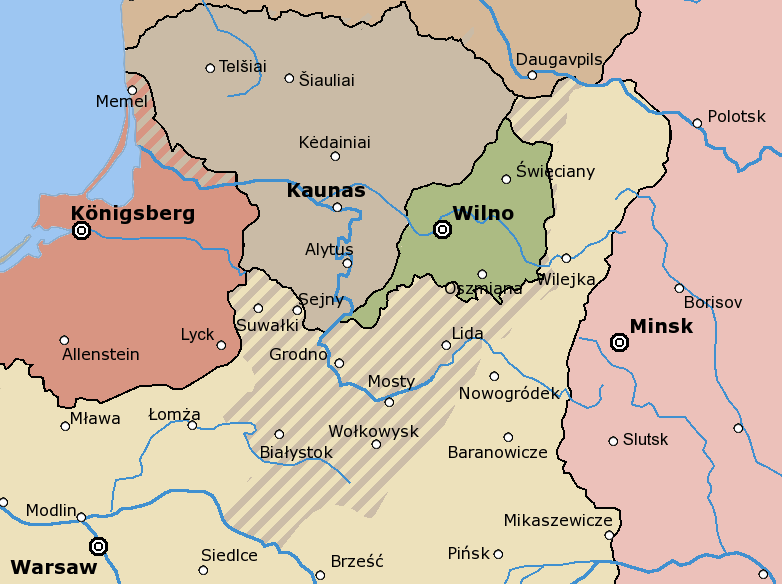
Map showing the territory of Central Lithuania (green) created by the Second Polish Republic as compared with the Kingdom of Lithuania, attempted to create in 1918 on the core territory of the former Grand Duchy of Lithuania c. 1921.

Vilnius Region^{[a]} is the territory in present-day Lithuania and Belarus that was originally inhabited by ethnic Baltic tribes and was a part of Lithuania proper, but came under East Slavic and Polish cultural influences over time.

The territory included Vilnius, the historical capital of the Grand Duchy of Lithuania. Lithuania, after declaring independence from the Russian Empire, claimed the Vilnius Region based on this historical legacy. Poland argued for the right of self-determination of the local Polish-speaking population. As a result, throughout the interwar period the control over the area was disputed between Poland and Lithuania. The Soviet Union recognized it as part of Lithuania in the Soviet–Lithuanian Peace Treaty, but in 1920 it was seized by Poland and became part of the short-lived puppet state of Central Lithuania, and was subsequently incorporated into the Second Polish Republic.

Direct military conflicts (Polish–Lithuanian War and Żeligowski's Mutiny) were followed up by fruitless negotiations in the League of Nations. After the Soviet invasion of Poland in 1939, as part of the Soviet fulfilment of the Molotov–Ribbentrop Pact, the entire region was occupied by the Soviet Union. About one-fifth of the region, including Vilnius, was ceded to Lithuania by the Soviet Union on 10 October 1939 in exchange for Soviet military bases within the territory of Lithuania as part of the Soviet–Lithuanian Mutual Assistance Treaty. The remaining part of the region was given to the Byelorussian Soviet Socialist Republic.

The conflict over Vilnius Region was settled after World War II when both Poland and Lithuania were in the Eastern Bloc, as Poland was the Soviet satellite state of the Polish People's Republic and Lithuania was occupied by the Soviet Union as the Lithuanian Soviet Socialist Republic, and Poles were repatriated to Poland. From the late 1940s to 1990, the region was divided between the Lithuanian SSR and Byelorussian SSR, and since 1990 between modern-day independent Lithuania and Belarus.

== Territory and terminology ==
Eastern (brown) and Western (orange) Vilnius Regions in relation to the current territory of Lithuania

Initially, the Vilnius Region did not possess exact borders per se, but encompassed Vilnius and the surrounding areas. This territory was disputed between Lithuania and Poland after both countries had successfully reestablished their independence in 1918. Later, the western limit of the region became a de facto administration line between Poland and Lithuania following Polish military action in autumn 1920. Lithuania refused to recognize this action or the border. The eastern limit was defined by the Soviet–Lithuanian Peace Treaty. The eastern line was never turned into an actual border between states and remained only a political vision. The total territory covered about 32,250 km^{2} (12,450 sq mi).

Today the eastern limit of the region lies between the Lithuanian and Belarusian border. This border divides the Vilnius Region into two parts: western and eastern. The Western Vilnius Region, including Vilnius, is now part of Lithuania. It constitutes about one-third of the total Vilnius Region. Lithuania gained about 6,880 km^{2} (2,660 sq mi) on October 10, 1939, from the Soviet Union and 2,650 km^{2} (1,020 sq mi) (including Druskininkai and Švenčionys) on August 3, 1940, from the Byelorussian SSR. The Eastern Vilnius Region became part of Belarus. No parts of the region are in modern Poland. None of the countries have any further territorial claims.

The term Central Lithuania refers to the short-lived puppet state of the Republic of Central Lithuania, proclaimed by Lucjan Żeligowski after his staged mutiny in the annexed areas. After eighteen months of existing under Poland's military protection, it was annexed by Poland on 24 March 1922 thus finalizing Poland's claims over the territory.

== Vilnius dispute ==
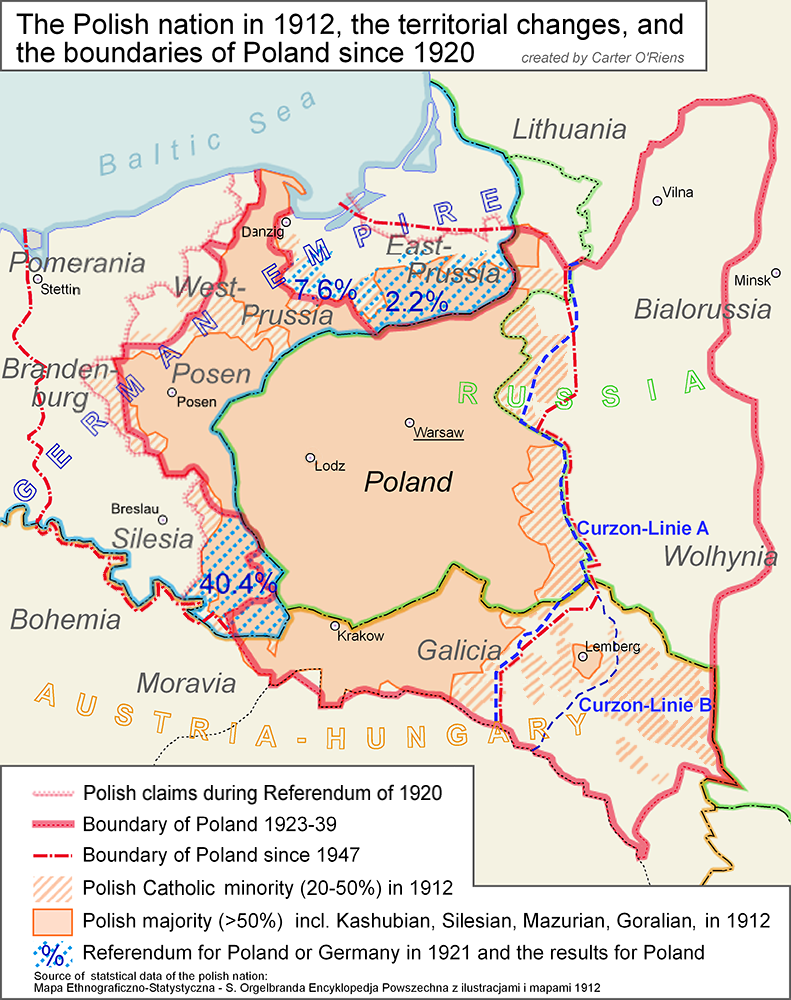
Polish pre-WWI ethnographic boundaries and territorial claims

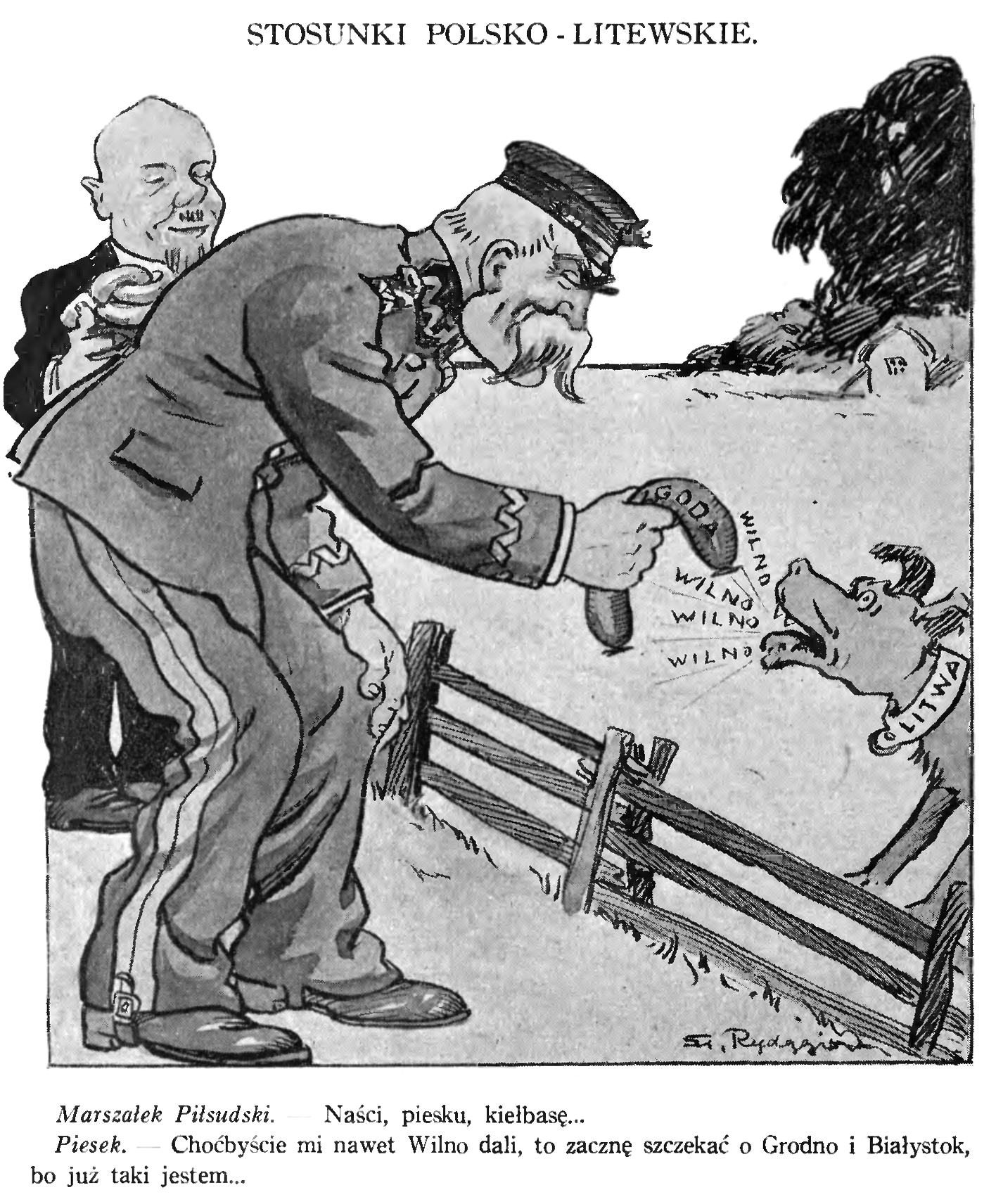
A satirical picture from interwar Polish press (around 1925–1935): a caricature of marshal Józef Piłsudski and Lithuania, criticizing Lithuanian unwillingness to compromise over Vilnius region. Marshal Piłsudski offers the sausage labelled "agreement" to the dog (with the collar labelled Lithuania); the dog barking "Wilno, wilno, wilno" replies: "Even if you were to give me Wilno, I would bark for Grodno and Białystok because this is who I am."

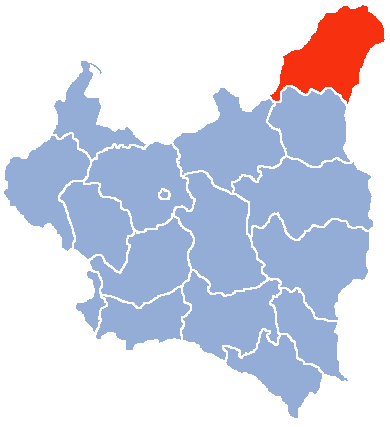
Wilno Voivodeship in interwar Poland

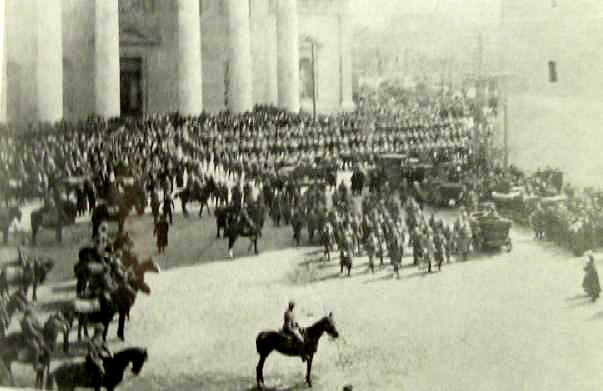
Polish Army soldiers parade in the Cathedral Square, Vilnius, 1919

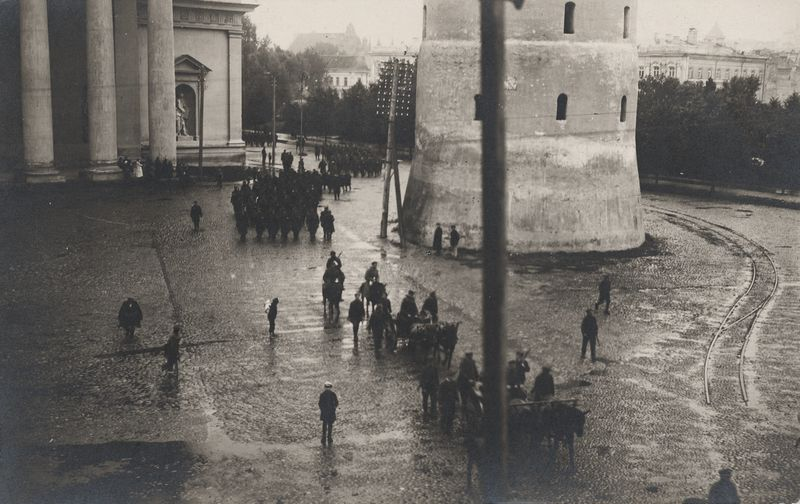
Soldiers of the Lithuanian Army in Cathedral Square, Vilnius, 1920

In the Middle Ages, Vilnius and its environs had become a nucleus of the early ethnic Lithuanian state, the Duchy of Lithuania, also referred to in Lithuanian historiography as a part of the Lithuania Propria, that became Kingdom of Lithuania and later Grand Duchy of Lithuania.

After the Partitions of the Polish–Lithuanian Commonwealth in the late 18th century it was annexed by the Russian Empire which established the Vilna Governorate there. As a result of World War I, it was seized by Germany and given to the civilian administration of the Ober-Ost. With the German defeat in World War I and the outbreak of hostilities between various factions of the Russian Civil War, the area was disputed by the newly established Lithuanian, Polish and Belarusian states.

The Poles based their claims on demographic grounds and pointed to the will of the inhabitants. The Lithuanians used geographical and historical arguments and underlined the role Vilnius had played as the capital of the Grand Duchy of Lithuania. According to Lithuanian national activists, the Poles and Belarusians in the region were "Slavicized Lithuanians".^{[b]} Their view is confirmed by both Polish and Lithuanian research.

The Vilnius Conference of September 1917, organized by Lithuanian nationalist activists under German auspices, elected a council of Lithuania, and an Act of Independence of Lithuania proclaimed an independent Lithuanian state, with its capital in Vilnius. The Lithuanian government, however, failed to recruit soldiers among the Vilnius area inhabitants and was unable to organize the defence of the region against the Bolsheviks. During November and December 1918, local Polish self-defence formations were created in Vilnius and many surrounding localities. They were formally included into the Polish Army by the end of the year. The Lithuanian Taryba left Vilnius together with the German garrison at the start of January 1919, when the first Polish-Soviet military clashes occurred east of the city.

After the outbreak of the Polish–Soviet War, during the summer offensive of the Red Army, the region came under Soviet control as the part of planned Lithuanian–Belorussian Soviet Socialist Republic (Litbel). Following the Lithuanian–Soviet War, Bolshevik Russia signed the Soviet–Lithuanian Peace Treaty with Lithuania on 12 July 1920, according to which, all areas disputed between Poland and Lithuania, at the time controlled by the Bolsheviks, were to be transferred to Lithuania. However, the area remained in the Bolsheviks' hands. After the Battle of Warsaw in 1920 it became clear that the advancing Polish Army would soon recapture the area. Seeing that they could not secure it, the Bolshevik authorities started to transfer the area to Lithuanian sovereignty. The advancing Polish Army managed to retake much of the disputed area before the Lithuanians arrived, though the most important part—the city of Vilnius—was secured by Lithuania.

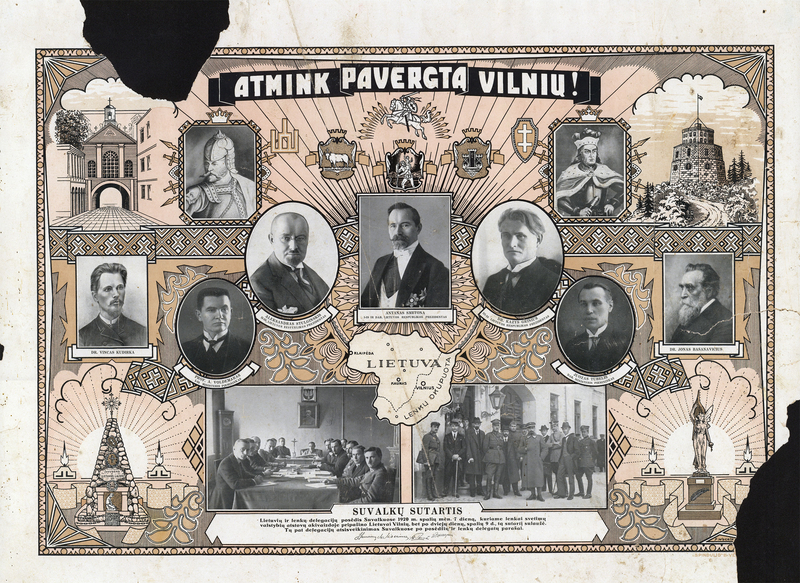
Lithuanian poster Remember enslaved Vilnius, the 1930s

Due to Polish-Lithuanian tensions, the allied powers withheld diplomatic recognition of Lithuania until 1922. Since the two states were not at war, diplomatic negotiations were begun. The negotiations and international mediation led nowhere and until 1920 the disputed territory remained divided into Lithuanian and Polish regions.

In the 1920s, League of Nations twice attempted to organise plebiscites, although neither side was eager to participate. After a staged mutiny by Lucjan Żeligowski, the Poles took control of the area and organised elections, which were boycotted by most Lithuanians, as well as by many Jews and Belarusians because of strong Polish military control.

The Polish government never acknowledged the Russo-Lithuanian convention of July 12, 1920, that granted the latter state territory seized from Poland by the Red Army during the Polish–Soviet War, then promised to Lithuania as the Soviet forces were retreating under the Polish advance, particularly as the Soviets had previously renounced claims to that region in the Treaty of Brest-Litovsk. In turn, the Lithuanian authorities did not acknowledge the Polish–Lithuanian border of 1918–1920 as permanent nor did they ever acknowledge the sovereignty of the puppet Republic of Central Lithuania.

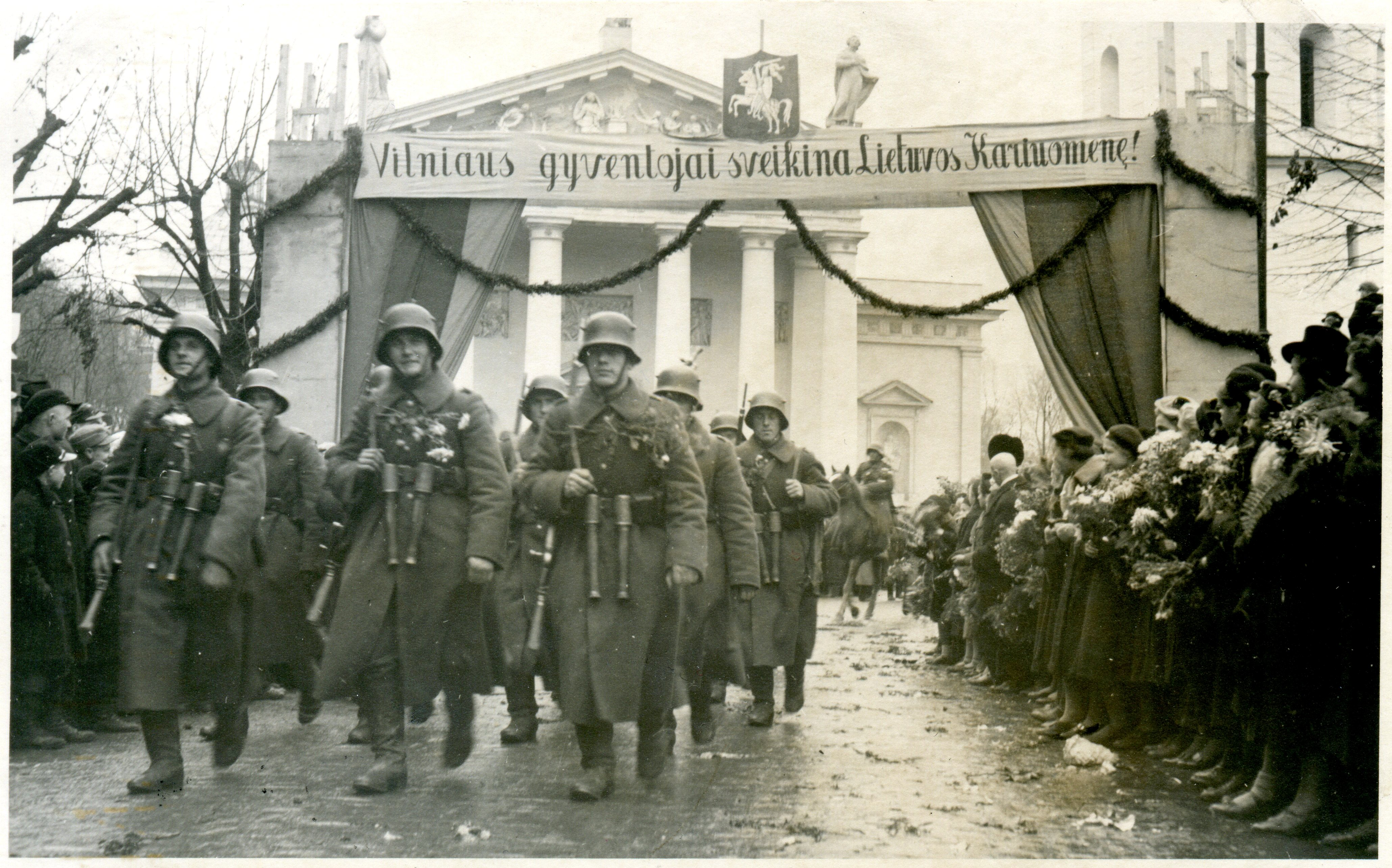
Lithuanian Army parade in the Gediminas Avenue, Vilnius, 1939

In 1922 the Republic of Central Lithuania voted to join Poland, and the choice was later accepted by the League of Nations, The area granted to Lithuania by the Bolsheviks in 1920 continued to be claimed by Lithuania, with Vilnius being treated as that state's official capital, with the temporary capital being Kaunas, and the states officially remained at war. It was not until the Polish ultimatum of 1938 that the two states resolved diplomatic relations.

Some historians speculated, that the loss of Vilnius might have nonetheless safeguarded the very existence of the Lithuanian state in the interwar period. Despite an alliance with the Soviets (Soviet–Lithuanian Peace Treaty) and the war with Poland, Lithuania was very close to being invaded by the Soviets in the summer of 1920 and having been forcibly converted into a socialist republic. They believe it was only the Polish victory over the Soviets in the Polish–Soviet War (and the fact that the Poles did not object to some form of Lithuanian independence) that derailed the Soviet plans and gave Lithuania an experience of interwar independence.

In 1939, the Soviets proposed to sign the Soviet–Lithuanian Mutual Assistance Treaty. According to this treaty, about one-fifth of the Vilnius Region, including Vilnius itself, was to be returned to Lithuania in exchange for stationing 20,000 Soviet troops in Lithuania. Lithuanians at first did not want to accept this, but later the Soviet Union said that troops would enter Lithuania, anyway, so Lithuania accepted the deal. A fifth of the Vilnius region was ceded, even though the Soviet Union had always recognised the whole Vilnius region as part of Lithuania previously. Vilnius Region was under Lithuanian administration until June 1940, when all of Lithuania was annexed by the Soviet Union.

The Soviet Union was awarded the Vilnius region during the Yalta Conference, and it subsequently became part of the Lithuanian SSR. About 150,000 of the Polish residents were repatriated from the Lithuanian SSR to Poland.

== Ethnography ==
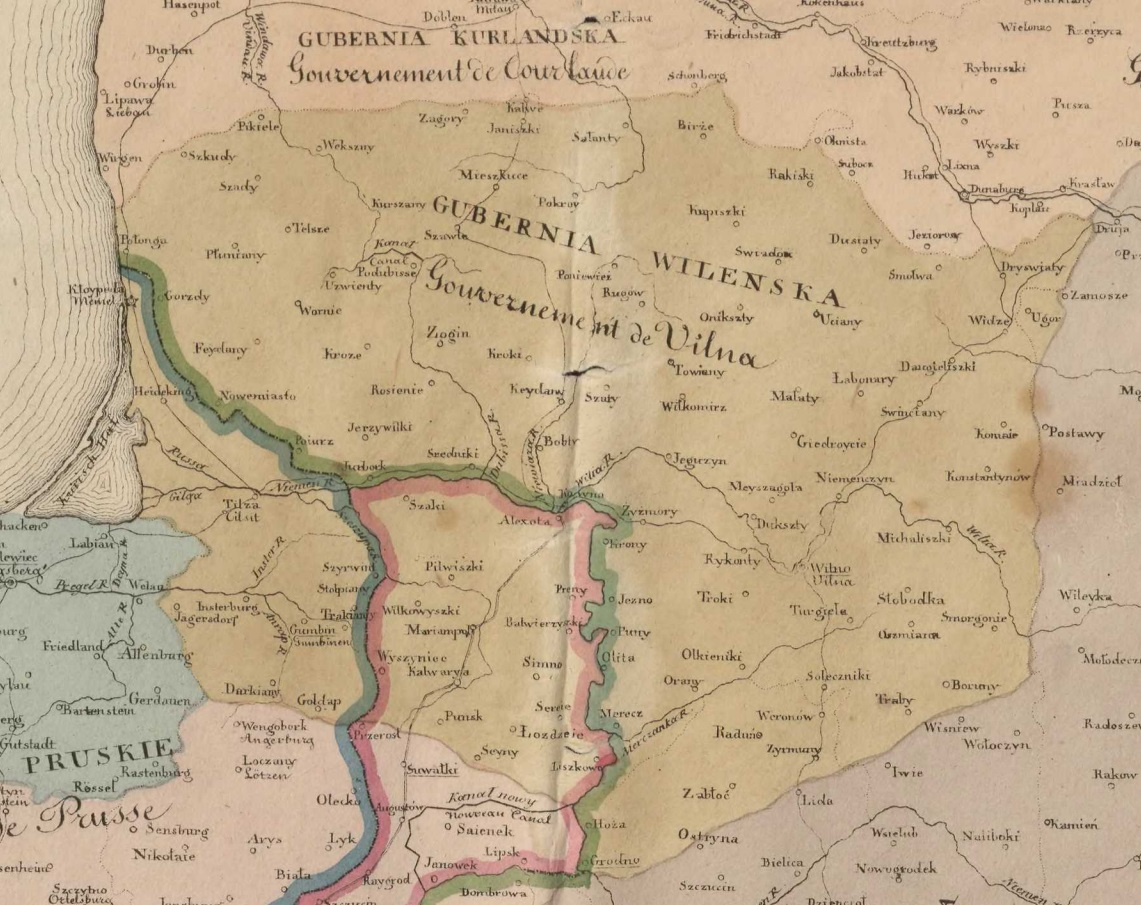
Map with an area (marked in greenish-yellow) where Lithuanian language was dominant in 1827 (from Atlas statystyczny Polski i krajow okolicznych by Stanisław Plater).

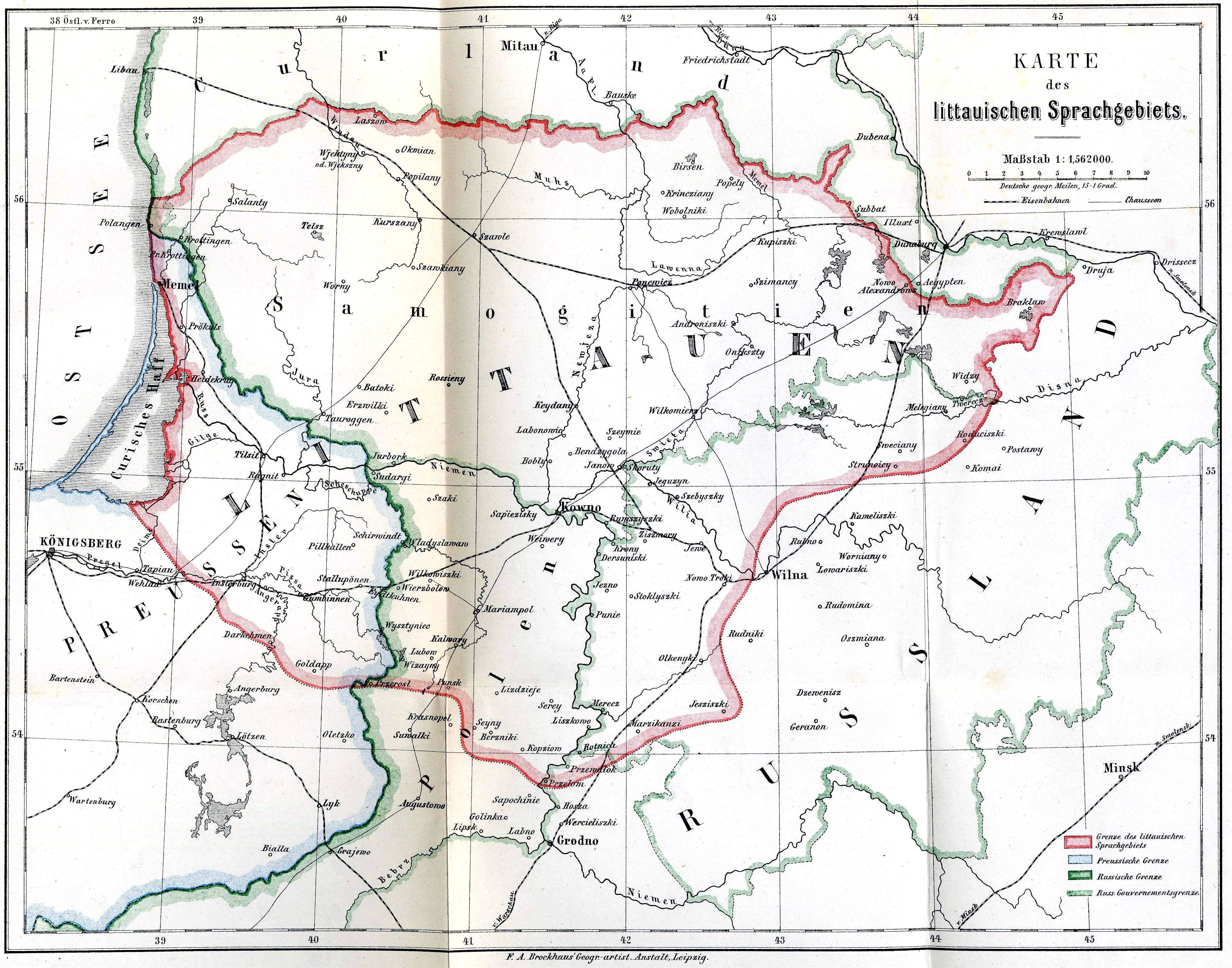
Lithuanian language area. Map by Prussian Lithuanian linguist Friedrich Kurschat (1876)

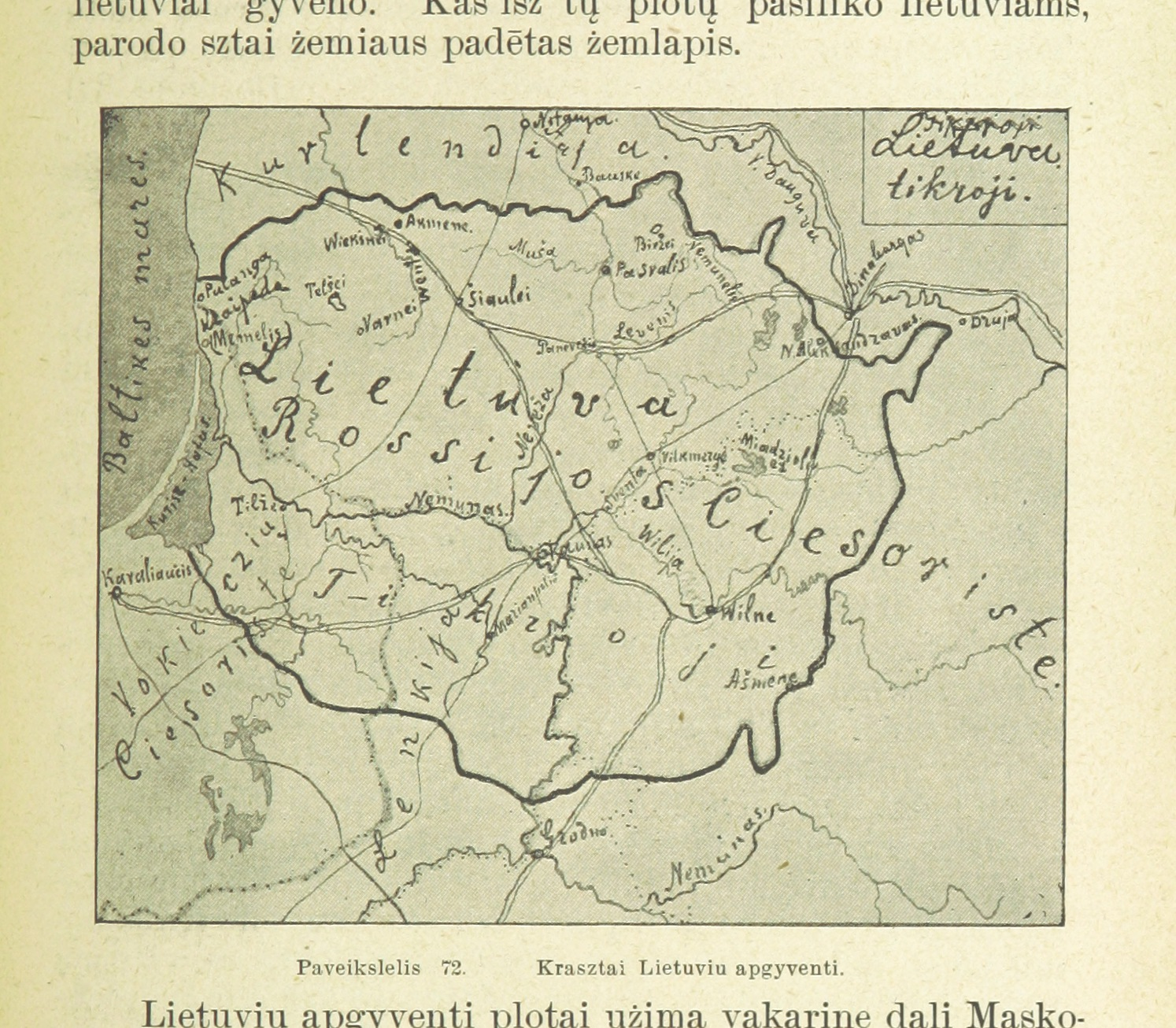
Lithuania Proper (Lietuva tikroji). Areas inhabited by Lithuanians as shown in a Lithuanian language world atlas (1899)

The area was originally inhabited by Lithuanian Balts. It was subjected to East Slavic and Polish cultural influences and settlement, which led to its gradual Ruthenization and Polonization. According to Norman Davies, Vilnius was culturally Polish by the 17th century. Jerzy Ochmański writes that by the 18th and 19th centuries, the city's environs were predominantly Slavic, while the Vilnius region became more and more ethnically diverse Belarusian-Polish-Lithuanian territory. Belarusians migrated into the south-eastern Lithuanian areas that were destroyed by conflicts of the 17th and 18th century (particularly the counties of Vilnius, Trakai, Švenčionys and northern Ašmena). As a result, only a handful of localities maintained their Lithuanian ethnic character there. According to the Russian census of 1897 (which studied the linguistic situation, but didn't include the category of ethnic affiliation)) the Vilna Governorate was occupied predominantly by Belarusian speakers (56,05%), while Polish speakers amounted to only 8,17% of the population. The Russians maintained that the local Polish population consisted mainly of nobles, while the region's peasantry could not be Polish. The later German (1916) and Polish (1919) censuses showed that Vilnius and its environs had a Polish majority. Vilnius at that point was divided nearly evenly between Poles and Jews, with Lithuanians constituting a mere fraction (about 2–2.6%) of the total population, but these figures were questioned by the Lithuanian side already after the censuses were performed, pointing to the fact, that even German censuses in 1915-1916 were actually carried out predominantly by the Poles on site. These censuses and their organisation were heavily criticized by contemporary Lithuanians of the region as biased.

At the end of the First World War, 50% of the Vilnius inhabitants were Polish and 43% were Jewish. According to E. Bojtar, who cites P. Gaučas, the surrounding villages were mainly inhabited by Belarusian speakers who considered themselves Poles. There was also a large group who chose their self-declared national identification in accordance with the particular political situation. According to the 1916 census conducted by the German authorities Lithuanians constituted 18.5% of the population. However, during this census the Vilnius region was expanded greatly and ended near Brest-Litovsk, and included the city of Białystok. Due to the addition of further Polish regions, the percentage of the Lithuanian population was diluted. The questioned by Lithuanian side post-war Polish censuses of 1921 and 1931, found 5% of Lithuanians living in the area, with several almost purely Lithuanian enclaves located to the south-west, south (Dieveniškės enclave), east (Gervėčiai enclave) of Vilnius and to the north of Švenčionys. The majority of the population was composed of Poles (roughly 60%) according to the latter three censuses. and the Lithuanian government claimed that the majority of local Poles were in fact Polonised Lithuanians. Today, the Po prostu dialect is the native language for Poles in Šalčininkai District Municipality and in some territories of Vilnius District Municipality; its speakers consider themselves to be Poles and believe Po prostu language to be purely Polish. The population, including those of "the locals" (Tutejshy) who live in the other part of Vilnius region that was occupied by the Soviet Union and passed on to Belarus, still has a strong presence of Polish identity. Despite the fact, that this language is the uncodified Belarusian vernacular with substrate relics from Lithuanian language, its speakers consider themselves to be Poles and believe Po prostu dialect to be purely Polish. The population, including those of "the locals" (Tutejszy) who live in the other part of Vilnius region that was occupied by the Soviet Union and passed on to Belarus, still has a strong presence of Polish identity.

Census in 1897

Language spoken. Majorities. Green - Belarusian-speaking population, yellow - Lithuanian-speaking population. Note: relative majority in Vilnius uyezd. Belarusian: (25,8 % with Vilnius city; 41,85% if excluding Vilnius), Lithuanian: (20,93 % with Vilnius city; 34,92% if excluding Vilnius)

Belarusian-speaking population

Lithuanian-speaking population

Lithuanian Jews, speaking Litvish dialect of Yiddish

Polish-speaking population

Russian-speaking population

After the extermination of Jews, displacements and migrations, Lithuanians became the undisputed ethnic majority in the Vilnius region in 1989 (50,5%). The share of Lithuanians in the Vilnius city grew from 2% in the first half of the 20th century to 42.5% in 1970, 57.8% in 2001 (while the total population of the city expanded several times) and 67.1% in 2021. The Poles are still concentrated in the area around Vilnius, and constituted 63.6% of the population in Vilnius District Municipality and 82.4% of the population in Šalčininkai District Municipality in 1989, By 2011 the number had shrunk to 52.07% of the population in Vilnius District Municipality and 77.75% in Šalčininkai District Municipality. By 2021 the number of Poles in Vilnius District Municipality had shrunk to below half (46.75%) of the population.

Recent geospatial analysis (2024) indicates a divergence in ethnolinguistic trends within the region. While the Vilnius–Trakai urbanized area has undergone intensive "re-Lithuanization" due to internal migration and economic expansion, the rural Lithuanian-speaking enclaves (such as the Dieveniškės appendix and the "linguistic islands" in Belarus like Gervėčiai and Pelesa) have faced drastic population decline—decreasing more than 13-fold in some areas between 1890 and 2021. Sociolinguistic studies in the Šalčininkai and Voranava borderlands describe the local Southern Aukštaitian dialect as undergoing a process of "language death." Intense contact with the local Belarusian vernacular (po prostu) has led to morphological interference, where bilingual speakers increasingly adapt Lithuanian grammatical gender and verb structures to match Slavic patterns.

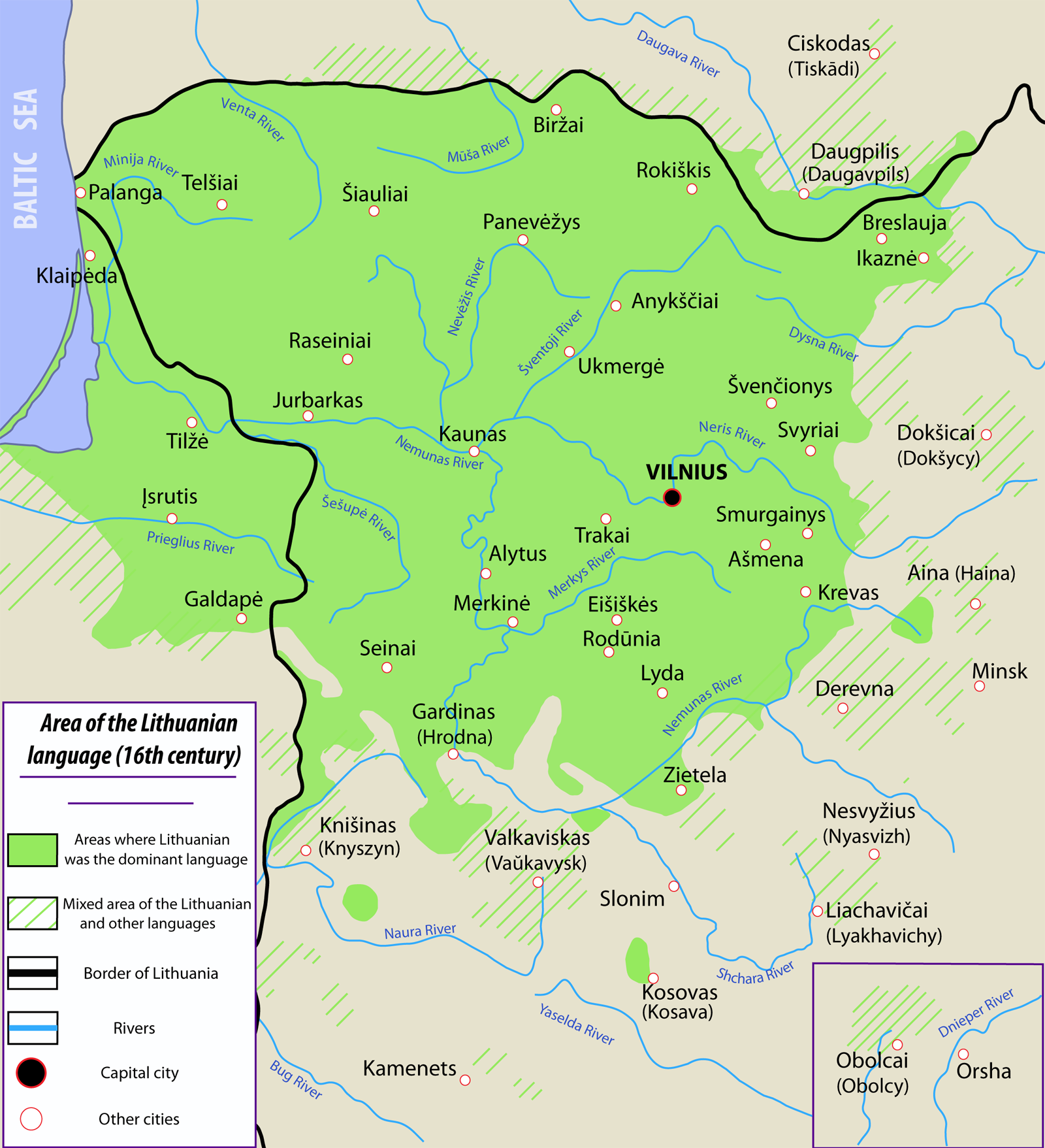
Lithuanian language in the 16th century

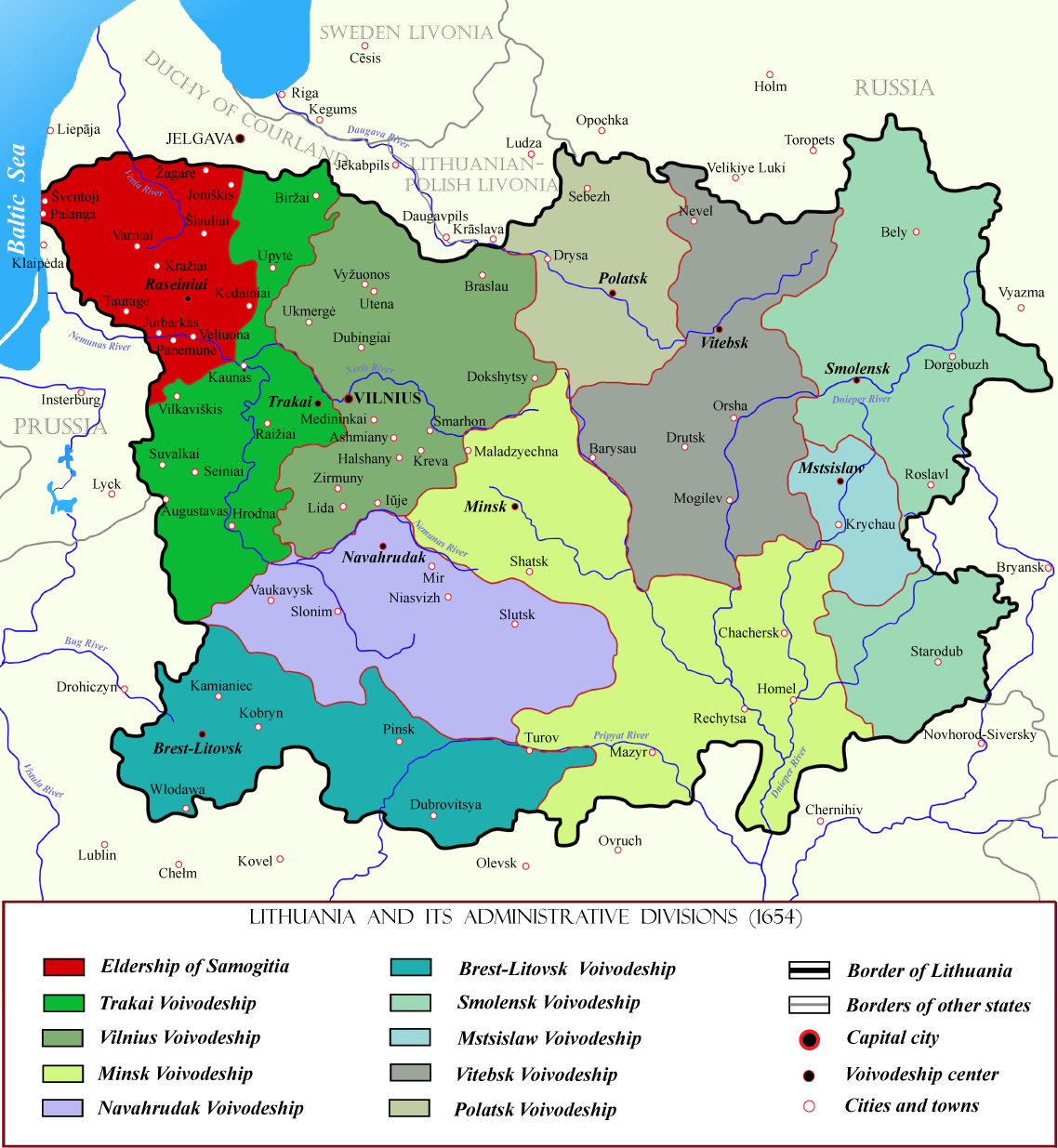
Lithuania in the 17th century

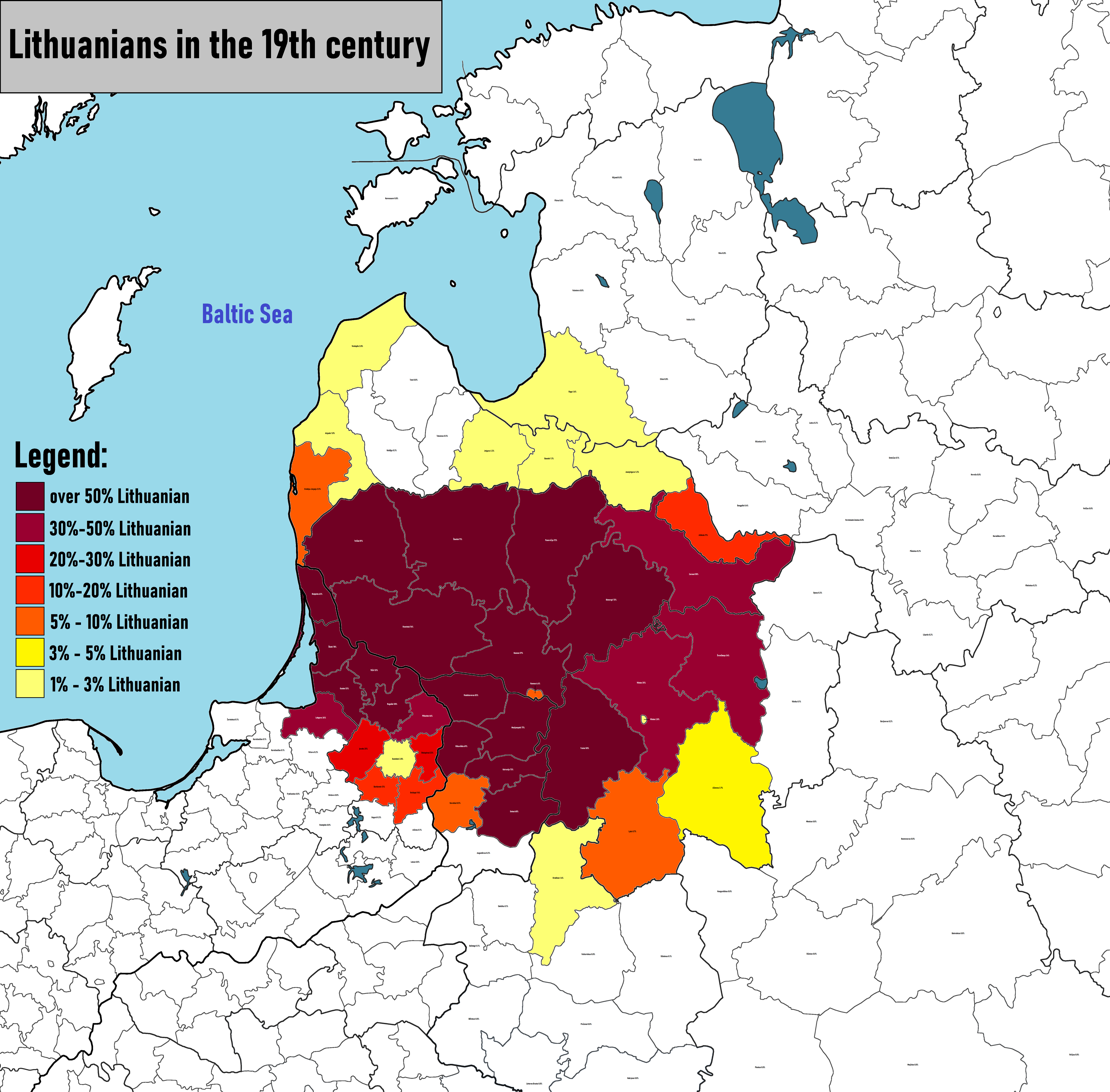
Distribution of ethnic Lithuanian population during the 19th century (1897 census)

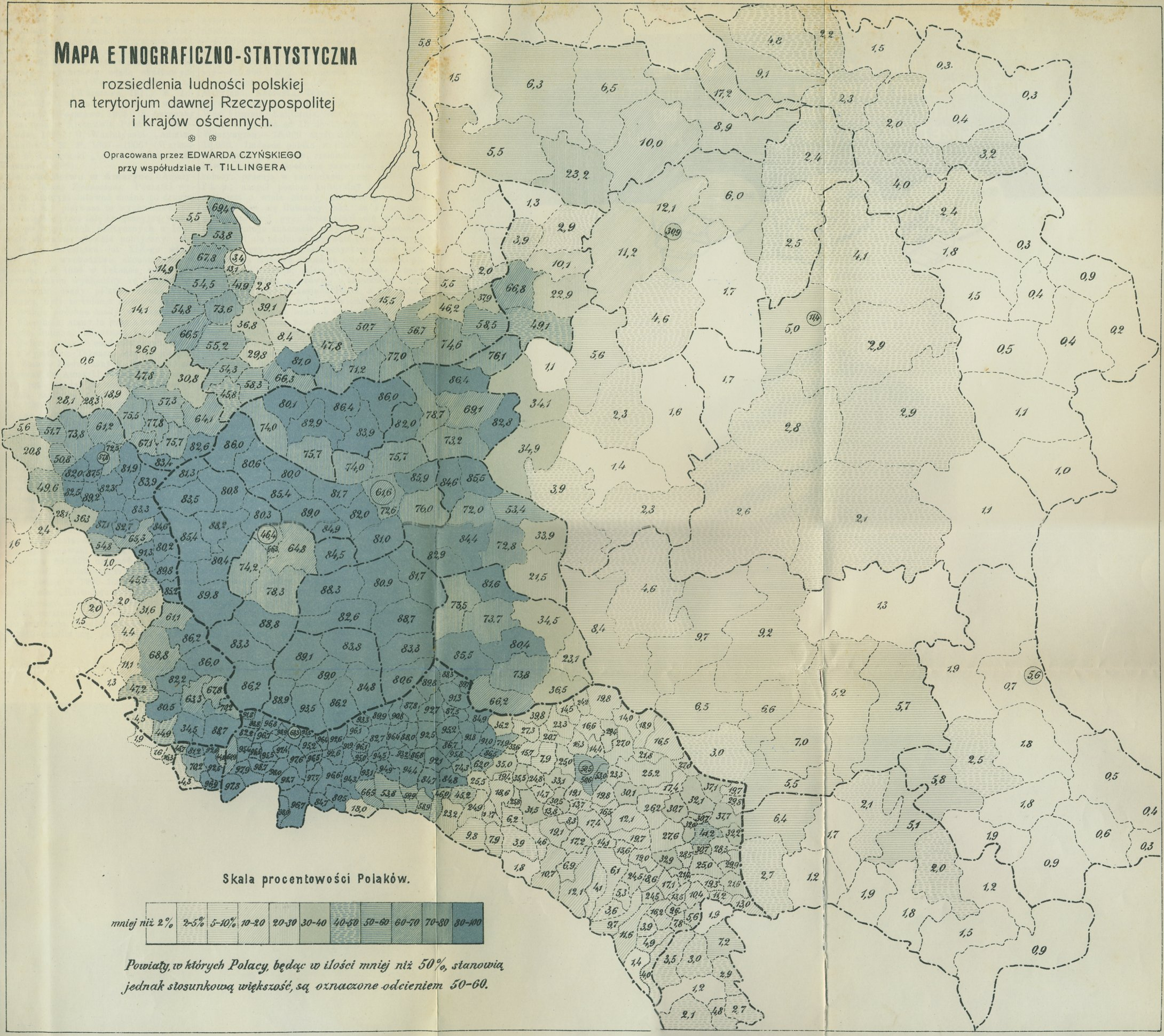
Polish ethnographic map from 1912, showing the proportions of Polish population on the territory of the former Polish–Lithuanian Commonwealth, according to pre-war censuses

Polish ethnographic map from 1916, showing the proportions of Polish population, according to German censuses of 1916

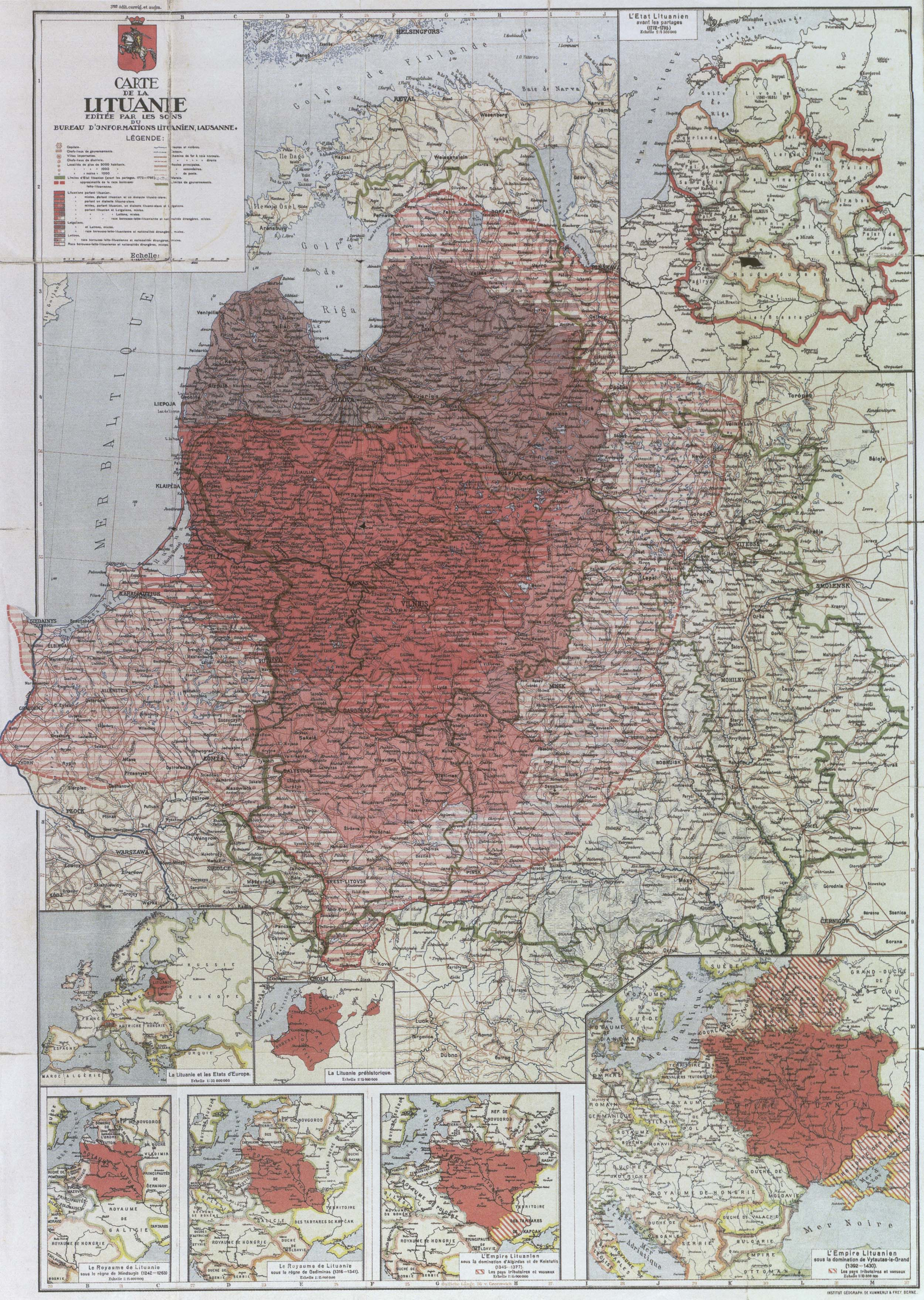
Lithuania and Lithuanians by Lithuanian informational bureau in Lausanne - 1918 AD

Lithuanian language in the early 21st century

== See also ==
- Disputed territories of Baltic States
- Ethnographic Lithuania
- Union for the Liberation of Vilnius
- History of Vilnius
- Lithuanization
- Poles in Lithuania
- Polonization
- Polish National-Territorial Region
- Suwałki Region
- Liauda

== Notes ==
a. Lithuanian: Vilniaus kraštas or Vilnija; Polish: Wileńszczyzna; Belarusian: Віленшчына. Also formerly known in English as Vilna Region or Wilno Region.

b. According to one of the leading Lithuanian national activists, Mykolas Biržiška, "the issue of belonging to a certain nationality is not decided by everyone at will, it is not a matter that can be resolved according to the principles of political liberalism, even one cloaked in democratic slogans." Another leading activist, Petras Klimas, had already declared in September 1917: "Giving the right of self-determination to the inhabitants of Wilno, a population devoid of culture, would mean giving an opportunity to agitators to fool people. The thing is to unite former branches with the old trunk. Based on that, we draw the border far beyond Wilno, near Oszmiana. Lida County is also Lithuanian..."

== Sources ==
- Balkelis, Tomas (2013). "Nation State, Ethnic Conflict, and Refugees in Lithuania: 1939–1940". In Bartov, Omer; Weitz, Eric D. (eds.). Shatterzone of Empires: Coexistence and Violence in the German, Habsburg, Russian, and Ottoman Borderlands. Indiana University Press. pp. 243–257.
- Barwiński, Marek; Leśniewska, Katarzyna (2010). "Vilnius region as a historical region". Region and Regionalism. Vol. 10.
- Bieliauskas, Pranciškus (2009). Vilniaus dienoraštis. 1915-1919 (in Lithuanian). Vilnius.
- Borzecki, Jerzy (2008). The Soviet-Polish Peace of 1921 and the creation of interwar Europe. Yale University Press.
- Bojtar, E. (2000). Foreword to the past: a cultural history of the Baltic people. Central European University Press.
- Brensztejn, Michał Eustachy (1919). Spisy ludności m. Wilna za okupacji niemieckiej od. 1 listopada 1915 r. (in Polish). Warsaw: Biblioteka Delegacji Rad Polskich Litwy i Białej Rusi.
- Budreckis, Algirdas (1967). "Etnografinės Lietuvos Rytinės ir Pietinės Sienos". Karys.
- Čepėnas, Pranas (1992). Naujųjų laikų Lietuvos istorija (in Lithuanian). Vol. II. Chicago: Dr. Griniaus fondas. ISBN 5-89957-012-1.
- Čekmonas, Valerijus; Grumadienė, Laima (2017). "Kalbų paplitimas Rytų Lietuvoje" [Distribution of languages in Eastern Lithuania]. Valerijus Čekmonas: kalbų kontaktai ir sociolingvistika (in Lithuanian). Vilnius: Lietuvių kalbos institutas. pp. 108–114, 864–866, 965–967. ISBN 9786094112010.
- Česnavičius, Darius; Stanaitis, Saulius (2010). "Dynamics of national composition of Vilnius population in the 2nd half of the 20th century". Bulletin of Geography. Socio-economic Series. No. 13. pp. 33–44.
- Davies, Norman (2005). God's Playground: The origins to 1795. Oxford University Press.
- Garšva, Kazimieras; Grumadienė, Laima (1993). Lietuvos rytai: straipsnių rinkinys (in Lithuanian). Vilnius: Valstybinis leidybos centras. ISBN 9986-09-002-4.
- Lipscomb, Glenard P.; Committee for a Free Lithuania (29 May 1958). "Extension of Remarks". Congressional Record. 104 - Appendix.
- Karjaharm, Toomas (2010). "Terminology Pertaining to Ethnic Relations as Used in Late Imperial Russia". Acta Historica Tallinnensia. Vol. 15.
- Klimas, Petras (1991). Iš mano atsiminimų (in Lithuanian). Vilnius: Enciklopedijų Redakcija.
- Kiaupa, Zigmantas (2004). The History of Lithuania. Vilnius: Baltos lankos. ISBN 9955-584-87-4.
- Krajewski, Zenon (1996). Geneza i dzieje wewnętrzne Litwy Środkowej (1920-1922) [The genesis and internal history of Central Lithuania (1920-1922)] (in Polish). Lublin. ISBN 83-906321-0-1.
- Łossowski, Piotr (1995). Konflikt polsko-litewski 1918-1920 [The Polish-Lithuanian Conflict, 1918–1920] (in Polish). Warsaw: Książka i Wiedza. ISBN 83-05-12769-9.
- Merkys, Vytautas (2004). "Tautinė Vilniaus vyskupijos gyventojų sudėtis 1867-1917". Istorijos Akiračiai (in Lithuanian).
- Ochmański, Jerzy (1981). Litewska granica etniczna na wschodzie: od epoki plemiennej do XVI wieku [Lithuanian ethnic border in the east: from the tribal era to the 16th century] (in Polish). Adam Mickiewicz University in Poznań.
- Ochmański, Jerzy (1986). "The National Idea in Lithuania from the 16th to the First Half of the 19th Century: The Problem of Cultural-Linguistic Differentiation". Harvard Ukrainian Studies. Vol. X, no. 3/4.
- Owsinski, Jan; Eberhardt, Piotr (2003). Ethnic Groups and Population Changes in Twentieth-Century Central-Eastern Europe. M.E. Sharpe.
- Romer, Eugenjusz (1920). "Spis ludności na terenach administrowanych przez Zarząd Cywilny Ziem Wschodnich (Grudzień 1919)" [Census in the areas administered by the Civil Administration of the Eastern Territories (December 1919)]. Prace Geograficzne (in Polish). No. 7.
- Rukša, Antanas (1982). Kovos dėl Lietuvos nepriklausomybės (in Lithuanian). Vol. 3. Cleveland.
- Salzmann, Stephanie (2013). Great Britain, Germany and the Soviet Union: Rapallo and After, 1922-1934. Boydell Press.
- Senn, Alfred Erich (1962). "The Formation of the Lithuanian Foreign Office, 1918-1921". Slavic Review. Vol. 21, no. 3. pp. 500–507.
- Senn, Alfred Erich (1992). Lietuvos Valstybės Atkūrimas. Mokslo ir enciklopedijų leidykla.
- Szporluk, Roman (2000). Russia, Ukraine and the Breakup of the Soviet Union. Hoover Press.
- Šapoka, Adolfas (2013). Raštai (in Lithuanian). Vol. I - Vilniaus Istorija. Vilnius: Edukologija.
- Turska, Halina (1930). "Język polski na Wileńsczyzne". Wilno i Ziemia Wilenska (in Polish). Vol. I. Polska Drukarnia Nakładowa "LUX" Ludwika Chomińskiego.
- Zinkevičius, Zigmas (31 January 2014). "Lenkiškai kalbantys lietuviai" [Polish-speaking Lithuanians]. alkas.lt (in Lithuanian).
