= Mačiuliškės =

- Village
- Location of Mačiuliškės
- Coordinates: 54°42′14″N 25°41′35″E
- Country: Lithuania
- County: Vilnius County
- Municipality: Vilnius District Municipality
- Eldership: Lavoriškės eldership

Population (2011)
  - Total: 10
- Time zone: UTC+2 (EET)
  - Summer (DST): UTC+3 (EEST)

Mačiuliškės (Belarusian: Мацюлішкі, Polish: Maciuliszki) is a village in the Vilnius District Municipality, 4.2 kilometres (2.6 miles) from Lavoriškės.

It is the birthplace of Belarusian linguist Branislaw Tarashkyevich.
