= Branislaw Tarashkyevich =

Belarusian politician and linguist

- Браніслаў Тарашкевіч
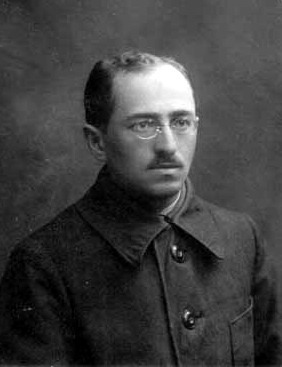
- Portrait of Branislaw Tarashkyevich
- Born: 20 January 1892; Matsyulishki, Vilna Governorate, Russian Empire (now Lithuania)
- Died: 29 November 1938 (aged 46); Moscow, Russian Soviet Federative Socialist Republic, Soviet Union (now Russia)
- Occupations: linguist, politician

Branislaw Adamavich Tarashkyevich (Note: Belarusian: Браніслаў Адамавіч Тарашкевіч, romanized: Branisłaŭ Adamavič Taraškievič, Russian: Бронислав Адамович Тарашкевич, romanized: Bronislav Adamovich Tarashkevich, Lithuanian: Bronislavas Taraškevičius, Polish: Bronisław Adamowicz Taraszkiewicz) (20 January 1892 – 29 November 1938) was a Belarusian public figure, politician, and linguist.

He first standardized the modern Belarusian language in the early 20th century. The standard was later Russified by the Soviet authorities. However, the pre-Russified (classical) standard version was and still is actively used by intellectuals and the Belarusian diaspora and is informally referred to as Taraškievica.

Tarashkyevich was a member of the underground Communist Party of Western Belorussia (KPZB) in Poland and was imprisoned for two years (1928–1930). Also, as a member of the Belarusian Deputy Club (Belarusian: Беларускі пасольскі клуб, Byelaruski pasol’ski klub), he was a deputy to the Polish Parliament (Sejm) in 1922–1927. Among others, he translated Pan Tadeusz into Belarusian, and in 1969 a Belarusian-language high school in Bielsk Podlaski was named after him.

In 1933 he was set free due to a Polish–Soviet prisoner release in exchange for Frantsishak Alyakhnovich, a Belarusian journalist and playwright imprisoned in a Gulag, and lived in Soviet exile since then.

He was shot at the Kommunarka shooting ground outside Moscow in 1938 during the Great Purge and was posthumously rehabilitated in 1957.
