= Zigmas Zinkevičius =

Lithuanian linguist (1925–2018)

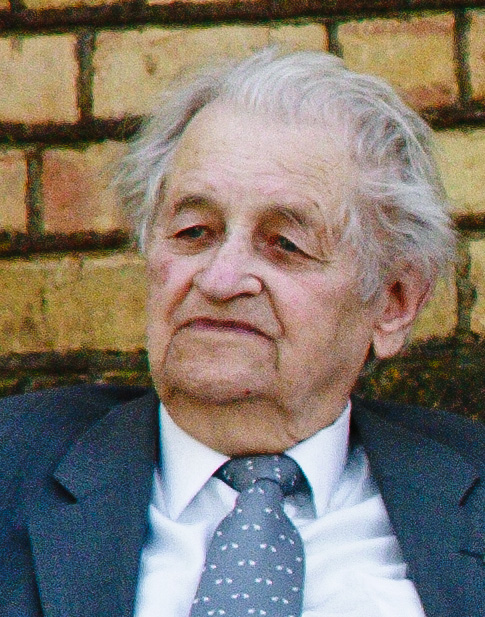
- Born: January 4, 1925; Juodausiai, Lithuania
- Died: February 20, 2018 (aged 93); Vilnius, Lithuania
- Occupations: academician; baltist; linguist; linguistic historian; dialectologist; professor; politician
- Years active: 1946–2018
- Known for: Linguistics, Baltistics, Dialectology, history of the Lithuanian language history of the study of the Lithuanian language, the historical grammar of the Lithuanian language, onomastics, recreation of Proto-Baltic
- Board member of: Lithuanian Language Society

Academic work
- Institutions: Vilnius University
- Notable works: History of the Lithuanian language (6 vols., published in 1984–1994)

Zigmas Zinkevičius (4 January 1925 – 20 February 2018) was a Lithuanian academician, Baltist, linguist, linguistic historian, dialectologist, politician, and the former Minister of Education and Science of Lithuania (1996–1998). Zinkevičius authored over a hundred books, including the popular six-volume "History of the Lithuanian Language" (1984–1994), and over a thousand articles, both in Lithuanian and other languages. He was an academician of the Lithuanian Catholic Academy of Science since 1991 and a full member of the Lithuanian Academy of Sciences from 1990 to 2011, when he became an emeritus member.

Zinkevičius was a member of the editorial boards of the Lithuanian Language Society (Lietuvių kalbos draugija) and of the international periodicals "Baltistica" and "Lituanistica". Zinkevičius created the theory about the three Lithuanian written languages at the beginning of Lithuanian writing. During his 72-year academic career, he taught at Vilnius University for 45 years. Zinkevičius was fluent in a number of languages, including English, German, Russian, Polish, Ukrainian, Belarusian and French.

== Life and career ==
Zinkevičius was born on 4 January 1925 in the Juodausiai village in Ukmergė district. In 1939, after finishing the six-year school, he transferred to the Antanas Smetona Gymnasium in Ukmergė. In 1945, Zinkevičius entered the Faculty of History and Philology of Vilnius University (VU).

=== Academics ===
Zinkevičius's academic career began in 1946, when he held the position of chief laboratory assistant at the Lithuanian Department of Vilnius University until 1950. After finishing his studies in 1950, Zinkevičius taught in VU and the Vilnius Pedagogical Institute until 1956. In 1955, he defended his thesis Lietuvių kalbos įvardžiuotinių būdvardžių istorijos bruožai (lit. 'Historical Traits of Adjective Pronouns in the Lithuanian Language'). Between 1956 and 1967, he was the docent at the Department of Lithuanian Language of VU. Zinkevičius was also the deputy dean of the Faculty of History and Philology in 1956–1968 and between 1962 and 1964, held the position of chief researcher. Between 1964 and 1966, together with Aleksas Stanislovas Girdenis, Zinkevičius prepared a new classification of the dialects of the current Lithuanian language. In 1967, he defended his doctoral thesis Lietuvių dialektologija (Lyginamoji tarmių fonetika ir morfologija) ('Lithuanian Dialectology (Comparative Phonetics and Morphology of Dialects)'). From 1967 to 1973, Zinkevičius received the position of professor at the Department of the Lithuanian Language. He was the head of the Department of Lithuanian Language at the Faculty of Philology of Vilnius University from 1973 until 1988.

Then, between 1988 and 1991, Zinkevičius became the head of the Department of Baltic Philology. After Lithuania regained its independence, he also began lecturing at the Vytautas Magnus University. He was the director of the Lithuanian Language Institute in 1995 and 1996.

From 2001 to 2009, he was the Chairman of the Council of the Science and Encyclopaedia Publishing Institute. Zinkevičius was also the editor-in-chief of the Lithuania Minor Encyclopedia (3 vols. 2000–06). While in his nineties, he still worked as many as 10–12 hours a day. The professor was widely-acclaimed as the most famous, productive, and cited Lithuanian linguist of recent times. His works concerned subjects such as dialectology and the Lithuanian language's history, as well as the history of its study, its historical grammar, onomastics, and he reviewed many works of linguistics. Zinkevičius's work was well-received, both in Lithuania and abroad, where he was elected as a foreign member of many academies: the Royal Swedish Academy of Letters, History and Antiquities from 1982, Norwegian Academy of Science and Letters from 1991, Latvian Academy of Sciences from 1995.

=== Politics ===
According to Polish historian Barbara Jundo-Kaliszewska, during the 1980s and 1990s, Zinkevičius was one of the prominent activists of the nationalist and anti-Polish, organization Vilnija, whose main goal was a rapid Lithuanization of the Vilnius region.

Zinkevičius tenured as Minister of Education and Science from December 10, 1996, to March 25, 1998, in Vagnorius Cabinet II and was a state consultant on education and science issues in 1998. During his tenure as Minister of Education and Science, he helped intensify the policy of Lithuanianization of the Polish minority living in Lithuania. On December 17, 1996, in an interview he said that Lithuanian should be the sole language of lectures in state schools, and that youth in Vilnius Region speak a "simple" language, while in schools they are forced to speak in a language foreign to them, Polish. He also questioned the citizenship of those who do not speak Lithuanian. The statement prompted a protest from the Polish Foreign Ministry and the Congress of Poles of Lithuania. Prime Minister Gediminas Vagnorius declared that the minister's opinions did not reflect the government's position.

On February 3, 2015, he was one of 60 signatories of an open letter addressed, among others, to Lithuanian President Dalia Grybauskaitė and members of the government, in which he demanded that the Polish minority party LLRA be excluded from the government coalition and that the party's deputies be stripped of their seats in the Seimas, due to the stated reasons that LLRA's views are openly directed against the state and it repeatedly lies in international forums about discrimination against the Polish minority in Lithuania, without specifying which parts of Lithuanian or international law were broken by Lithuania. On August 28, 2015, he published an open letter addressed to the Minister of Education Juozas Bernatonis protesting a planned reform allowing Poles in Lithuania to spell their names in Polish, arguing that: "Undoubtedly, the supposedly Polish surnames of most Polish-speakers in Southeastern Lithuania are actually of Lithuanian origin. They were Polonized during the Polish and Soviet occupations".

After Zinkevičius's death, Lithuania's prime minister between 1996 and 1999 Gediminas Vagnorius said that Zinkevičius "brought a different approach, a sincere, matter-of-fact, professional approach to education policy and forced others to step up" and described him as "very sincere, very benevolent and distinguished by high intelligence". He was elected chairman of the Lithuanian Christian Democratic Party in 1999. He resigned from the leadership of the party on November 17, 2000, in protest against the merger of the Lithuanian Christian Democratic Party with the Christian Democratic Union (KDS) led by Kazys Bobelis. He became a member of the new Lithuania's Christian Democracy Party in 2001.

== Personal life ==
The grave of Zigmas Zinkevičius at the Antakalnis cemetery

Zigmas Zinkevičius was always a practising Roman Catholic. His wife was Regina Zinkevičienė and they had two children, Laima Zinkevičiūtė and Vytautas Zinkevičius. He died in hospital on 20 February 2018, surrounded by his family. He was buried in the Antakalnis cemetery on February 23. The contemporary president Dalia Grybauskaitė, when expressing her condolences on his death, said that Lithuania lost an outstanding linguist:

The fundamental scientific works of the long-time Vilnius University professor made it possible to learn about the past of our language and nation, to understand its origin, to strengthen Lithuanianness and national self-esteem.

The contemporary Minister of Education and Science Jurgita Petrauskienė said:

Lithuania and the entire educational community lost an authoritative linguist, dialectologist, researcher of Baltistics, a great person. A bright memory of his personality also remains: a prominent scientist and at the same time a modest, benevolent, very hardworking and respectful person.

== Reception and legacy ==
Zinkevičius is highly acclaimed in international sources, where he is described as an "excellent linguistic historian of the greatest professional repute", "eminent", and "great Lithuanian scholar". On the topic of Polish–Lithuanian relations, in his book Vilnijos lenkakalbių pavardės (Surnames of the Vilnius Region's Polish-speakers), Zinkevičius emphasized that today Lithuanians and Poles should coexist in a nice way, but that this could only happen if the relations and history of both nations were based on the truth. He has said that:

They need to look at history correctly, recognizing that Lithuanians are not descended from Polish-speakers, but on the contrary: local Polish-speakers descend from Lithuanian-speaking people.

On his 90th birthday in 2015, Zinkevičius said: "I saw many governments, but I never changed my views, which made me disliked by those who changed them. This is how I am, this is how I will die, I wish everyone every success". Vytautas Landsbergis, the honorary chairman of the Homeland Union at the time, congratulated Zinkevičius on his birthday with the following words:

I want to say, dear academician, that your name and the name of Lithuania are connected. Lithuania is a nation, and the basis of the nation is language. You have done immeasurable work in this area. May God give you the strength to increase the large pile of books about Lithuania.

Other notable people in Lithuania, such as the contemporary President of Lithuania Dalia Grybauskaitė, Prime Minister Algirdas Butkevičius, Deputy Speaker of the Seimas Irena Degutienė, sent representatives also to congratulate Zinkevičius. The contemporary Minister of Education and Science Dainius Pavalkis emphasized that Zinkevičius's scientific work made Lithuania famous in the world and thanked Zinkevičius for his strengthening of the Lithuanian schools in southeastern Lithuania while he was a minister: "You achieved that all residents of this region who want to learn Lithuanian could do so." Professor Romualdas Baltrušis, Zinkevičius's childhood friend, recalled that the years of Soviet occupation was hard for Zinkevičius and was glad that his work remained serious, uninfluenced by the Communist ideology, and that he did not ignore the dangerous events for Lithuania and defended Lithuanian language and national identity from those opposed to them. Zigmas Zinkevičius is the focus of the documentary film Zigmas Zinkevičius. Pamilęs lietuvių kalbą ('Zigmas Zinkevičius: Having Fallen in Love with the Lithuanian Language') created by director Algirdas Tarvydas in 2015. (Note: The documentary film is freely available on LRT.lt.)

=== Awards ===
In 1994, Zinkevičius, as the professor of VMU, was awarded the regalia of an Honorary Doctor. For his services to Lithuania in 1995, Zinkevičius was awarded the Order of the Lithuanian Grand Duke Gediminas, 3rd Class. He was also the laureate of the international Herder Prize in 1994 and the Lithuanian Science Advancement Award in 1995. In addition, he was awarded the title of Honorary Doctorate of the University of Latvia. In 2015, on July 6, the Lithuanian Statehood Day, Zinkevičius was awarded the Commander's Grand Cross of the Order for Merits to Lithuania by president Grybauskaitė.

=== Criticism ===
American historian Theodore R. Weeks expressed his opinion on Zigmas Zinkevičius lifetime professional work as a "flagship example" of a trend in Lithuanian historiography and linguistics that depicts the Vilnius region as "always Lithuanian". According to Weeks, Zinkevičius in his book Eastern Lithuania in the Past and Now (published in 1993) "wishes to argue for the eternal Lithuanian nature of the region, a viewpoint that no historical or linguistic methods seem likely to support." He also defines Zinkevičius' approach as "historical-linguistic ethnocentrism". He emphasizes that Zinkevičius tends to ignore the actual ethnographic data and alleged national self-identification of the inhabitants, in favour of promoting the thesis of the unchanging Lithuanian nature of the region.

Polish researcher Robert Boroch is of a similar opinion, in his review of Zinkevičius's work The History of the Lithuanian Language (published in 1996) Boroch emphasized that "the weakness of the work is the lack of objectivity, mixing ideology and scientific facts". He describes Zinkevičius's thesis about the lack of connection between the Polish language used in Lithuania and the one used in Poland as "wrong, because differences in pronunciation cannot be a distinctive feature sufficient to distinguish a given language", and his position as "justified only from the propaganda point of view", which Boroch believes aims to put the Polish language in Lithuania in the position of "a secondary and dying language".

== Publications ==
In Lietuvių dialektologija (1966), his most important work in dialectology, Zinkevičius presented the comparative phonetics and morphology of the Lithuanian dialects, which included 75 maps with the phonetic data of the dialects. For this book, he received the LSSR state prize in 1968 and a Habilitated Doctor degree.

His most important work for Lithuanian accentology is his work Iš lietuvių istorinės akcentologijos: 1605 katekizmo kirčiavimas (lit. From Lithuanian Historical Accentology: Accentuation of the 1605 Catechism) from 1975. Zinkevičius was the editor-in-chief of the book Kalbos praktikos patarimai (1976, 1985). In his 1977 book Lietuvių antroponimika: Vilniaus lietuvių asmenvardžiai 17 a. pradžioje (lit. Lithuanians' anthroponymics: Vilnius' Lithuanians' personal names in the early 17th century), Zinkevičius looked at more than 5,000 Lithuanian personal names and examined the process of the polonization of Lithuanian surnames. Zinkevičius prepared textbooks for higher education, e.g. Lietuvių kalbos dialektologija (lit. The Lithuanian language's dialectology; 1978, 1994) and Lietuvių kalbos istorinė gramatika (lit. Lithuanian language's historical grammar; 2 vols. 1980–81). The latter book was the first historical grammar of the Lithuanian language, which thoroughly examined the main issues of Lithuanian grammar.

Zinkevičius researched and published the Polish-Yotvingian dictionary "Pagan Dialects from Narew" (1983, 1985). Zinkevičius wrote the monographs Rytų Lietuva praeityje ir dabar (lit. Eastern Lithuania in the past and now; 1993) and the Lietuvių kalbos istorija (lit. The History of the Lithuanian Language; 1996, published both in Lithuanian and English). He also authored books to popularize science, for example, Kaip žmonės išmoko rašyti (lit. How People Learned to Write; 1958), Lietuvių kalbos tarmės (lit. The Lithuanian language's dialects; 1968), Kalbotyros pradmenys (lit. Basics of Language research; 1969, 1980), Kalbininkas K. Būga (lit. Linguist K. Būga; 1981), Tautos kilmė (lit. Nation's origin; 2006). He wrote the book Tautos kilmė together with others, and it was published in English and German in 2005 and Russian in 2006. In addition, Zinkevičius is also the author of the following books (this list is not comprehensive):

- Lietuvių poteriai (2000)
- Istorijos iškraipymai (2004)
- Krikščionybės ištakos Lietuvoje (2005)
- Lietuvių tautos kilmė (2005)
- Lietuvių tarmių istorija (2006)
- Lietuvių tarmių kilmė (2006)
- Senosios Lietuvos valstybės vardynas (2007)
- Lituanistikos (baltistikos) mokslas ir pseudomokslas (2007)
- Rašto kilmė (2007)
- Mažosios Lietuvos indėlis į lietuvių kultūrą (2008)
- Lietuvių asmenvardžiai (2009)
- Lietuvos vardas: Kilmė ir formų daryba (2010)
- Krikščioniško vardyno kelionė į Lietuvą (2010)
- Lietuviškas paveldas Suvalkų ir Augustavo krašto Lenkijoje pavardėse: polonizacijos apybraiža (2010)
- Šventasis Brunonas ir Lietuva (2010)
- Lietuviškas (baltiškas) paveldas Balstogės vaivadijos Lenkijoje pavardėse: slavizacijos apybraiža (2011)
- Ukmergės rajono gyvenviečių vardynas: pavadinimų kilmė (2011)
- Lietuvos senosios valstybės 40 svarbiausių mįslių (2011)
- Vilnijos lenkakalbių pavardės (2012)
- Lietuviai: praeitis, didybė, sunykimas (2013, 2014)

Zinkevičius has also published studies regarding the Lithuanian language in the writings of Martynas Mažvydas, Konstantinas Sirvydas, Mozerka Saliamonas Slavočinskis, Kristijonas Donelaitis and the Wolfenbüttel postil. He also authored three autobiographies:

- Kaip aš buvau ministras (1998)
- Prie lituanistikos židinio (1999)
- Po aštuonerių metų (2006)

He also published the four-volume book Rinktiniai straipsniai (lit. Selected articles) in 2002–2004, containing his articles that were published in the Lithuanian press. He also prepared the Kazimieras Būga's Rinktiniai straipsniai (lit. Selected articles; 3 vols. 1958–61 and an index volume in 1962) and the book Kazimieras Būga: Gyvenimas ir darbai (lit. Kazimieras Būga: Life and Work; 1979). Together with others, he also created the Lietuvių kalbos vadovėlį IX–XI klasei (lit. Lithuanian language textbook for classes IX–XI), which was first published in 1971 and was re-printed a third time in 1997.
