= Kazimieras Garšva =

Lithuanian linguist

Kazimieras Garšva (born November 11, 1950, in Linkuva, near Pakruojis) is a Lithuanian linguist, and the leader of the cultural "Vilnija" organisation.

== Biography ==
From 1968 to 1973 Garšva studied philology and Lithuanian literature at Vilnius University, and from 1973 to 1976 he was a student at Moscow State University. In 1977 he received a Ph.D. for his doctoral thesis "Priegaidės fonologinėje sistemoje (remiantis lietuvių kalbos medžiaga)" (Pitch accents in the phonetic system (using Lithuanian language material)). Since 1993 he has held the title "Habilitated Doctor of Humanities".

Since 1973, Garšva has worked at the Institute of the Lithuanian language. He has authored more than 100 scientific publications and 5 books. Garšva is a coauthor of Grammar of Contemporary Lithuanian Language, published in three successive editions.

He is the leader of the Lithuanian cultural organisation "Vilnija". In 2016 he was presented with the Cross of the Knight of the Order for Merits to Lithuania.

== Academic fields of interest ==
- Dialects of the Lithuanian language
- Phonetics of the Lithuanian language
- Etymology of Lithuanian names
- The history of the Lithuanian language

=== Political activities ===
- Criticism of Electoral Action of Poles in Lithuania and past and current Polish-Lithuanian relations, particularly the crimes of Polish partisans (Armia Krajowa) in Lithuania during the Second World War. His statements and publications related to those issue, especially with respect to language issues, are seen as controversial, particularly in Poland.
- In 2013 it was reported in the press that he was collecting signatures for a pro-Lithuanian petition. This work was subsequently commented on by an anonymous author in an EU publication.

== Recent publications ==
1. Kazimieras Garšva. Bendrinės lietuvių kalbos ir tarmių balsių e•, e tartis.–Pranešimas KTU konferencijoje 2003-10-17 Kalbos teorija ir praktika.
2. Kazimieras Garšva. Lietuvių kalbos prozodemos.–Pranešimas Vilniaus universiteto Kauno Humanitarinio fakulteto tarptautinėje konferencijoje 2003-05-22.
3. Kazimieras Garšva. Zietelos ir Ciskodo lietuvių šnektos.– Pranešimas Liepojoje 2003-11-21 tarptautinėje konferencijoje Vārds und tā pētīšanas aspekti.
4. Kazimieras Garšva. The Method of Experimental Alternation in Dialectology. –4th International Congress of Dialectologists and Geolinguists. Abstracts of Scholarly papers, ISBN 9984-742-08-3. Riga, 2003 m. liepos 28–rugpjūčio 2 d. Pranešimas.
5. Kazimieras Garšva. Latvijos lietuvių uteniškių šnektos. –Kazimieras Jaunius (1848–1908). Tarmėtyrininkas ir kalbos istorikas. Konferencijos pranešimų tezės. Vilnius, 2003 m. gegužės 21–23 d., p. 20–22
6. Kazimieras Garšva. The Method of Experimental Alternation in Dialectology.–4th International Congress of Dialectologists and Geolinguists. Abstracts of Scholarly papers, ISBN 9984-742-08-3. Riga, 2003 m. liepos 28–rugpjūčio 2 d., p. 120–121.
7. R. Endzelytė, K. Garšva. Šiaurės panevėžiškių pasaulėžiūra Linkuvos parapijos vardyne.– Pasaulio vaizdas kalboje. Tarptautinė Šiaulių universiteto konferencija. ŠU, 2002, p. 11.
8. K. Garšva. Antrųjų rytiečių nekirčiuoti balsiai nuo Antano Baranausko iki šiol. – Tarptautinė konferencija "Vyskupas Antanas Baranauskas: asmenybė ir aplinka." Vilnius, 2002.
9. Armija krajova Lietuvoje / Editors : K. Garšva, A. Bubnys, E. Gečiauskas and others. Language: Lithuanian ISBN 9986577020
