= Natio =

Natio may refer to:

- Nation, as its original Latin term
- Nation (university), a student organisation in ancient and medieval universities
- Natio Hungarica, term for the people of Hungary irrespective of their ethnic background
- Nickname for the men's national football team of Suriname. Natio Uma is the nickname for the women's team.

== See also ==
- Nation (disambiguation)
