= Demographic history of the Vilnius region =

Population of Vilnius, 1530–1914
Year	Population
1530	30,000
1654	▼14,000
1766	▲60,000
1795	▼17,700
1800	▲31,000
1811	▲56,300
1818	▼33,600
1834	▲52,300
1861	▲60,500
1869	▲64,400
1880	▲89,600
1886	▲103,000
1897	▲154,500
1900	▲162,600
1911	▲238,600
1914	▼214,600

The demographic history of the Vilnius region encompasses population changes, as well as migration and assimilation processes that have taken place in the region over the centuries.

The Vilnius Region formed part of the Grand Duchy of Lithuania from the emergence of the Lithuanian state in the late Middle Ages until the Third Partition of Poland in 1795, when the Grand Duchy ceased to exist. Following the partitions of the Polish–Lithuanian Commonwealth, the region was incorporated into the Russian Empire, where it remained until its occupation by the German Empire during World War I in 1915.

After the collapse of the Russian Empire and the end of the war, Vilnius and its surrounding region became the subject of competing territorial claims by the newly established Republic of Lithuania and the Second Polish Republic. Finally the region was incorporated into Poland in 1922 and remained part of the Polish state throughout the Interwar period. Lithuania, however, continued to regard Vilnius as its de jure capital and did not recognize Polish sovereignty over the region.

In 1939, the region was occupied by the Soviet Union and transferred to Lithuania under the Soviet–Lithuanian Mutual Assistance Treaty. Following the Soviet annexation of Lithuania in 1940, it became part of the Lithuanian Soviet Socialist Republic. The region was occupied by Nazi Germany from 1941 to 1944, during which most of its Jewish population perished in the Holocaust. Reoccupied by the Soviet Union in 1944, it remained part of the Lithuanian Soviet Socialist Republic until 1990. Following the dissolution of the Soviet Union and the restoration of Lithuanian independence in 1990–1991, the Vilnius Region became part of the modern Republic of Lithuania.

Census data for the Vilnius Region are available from 1897 onward, although comparisons over time are complicated by changes in administrative boundaries, and ethnic classifications. The region's demographic structure underwent profound changes during the 20th century. The Jewish population, was largely annihilated during the Holocaust between 1941 and 1944. After World War II, a substantial part of the Polish population of Vilnius was resettled to post-war Poland, while the Polish population remained comparatively numerous in the surrounding rural areas. At the same time, migration from other parts of Lithuania and the Soviet Union contributed to the growth of the Lithuanian population in the city. As a result, recent census data show Lithuanians forming the majority population in the city of Vilnius, whereas Poles remain the largest ethnic group in the surrounding Vilnius District Municipality.

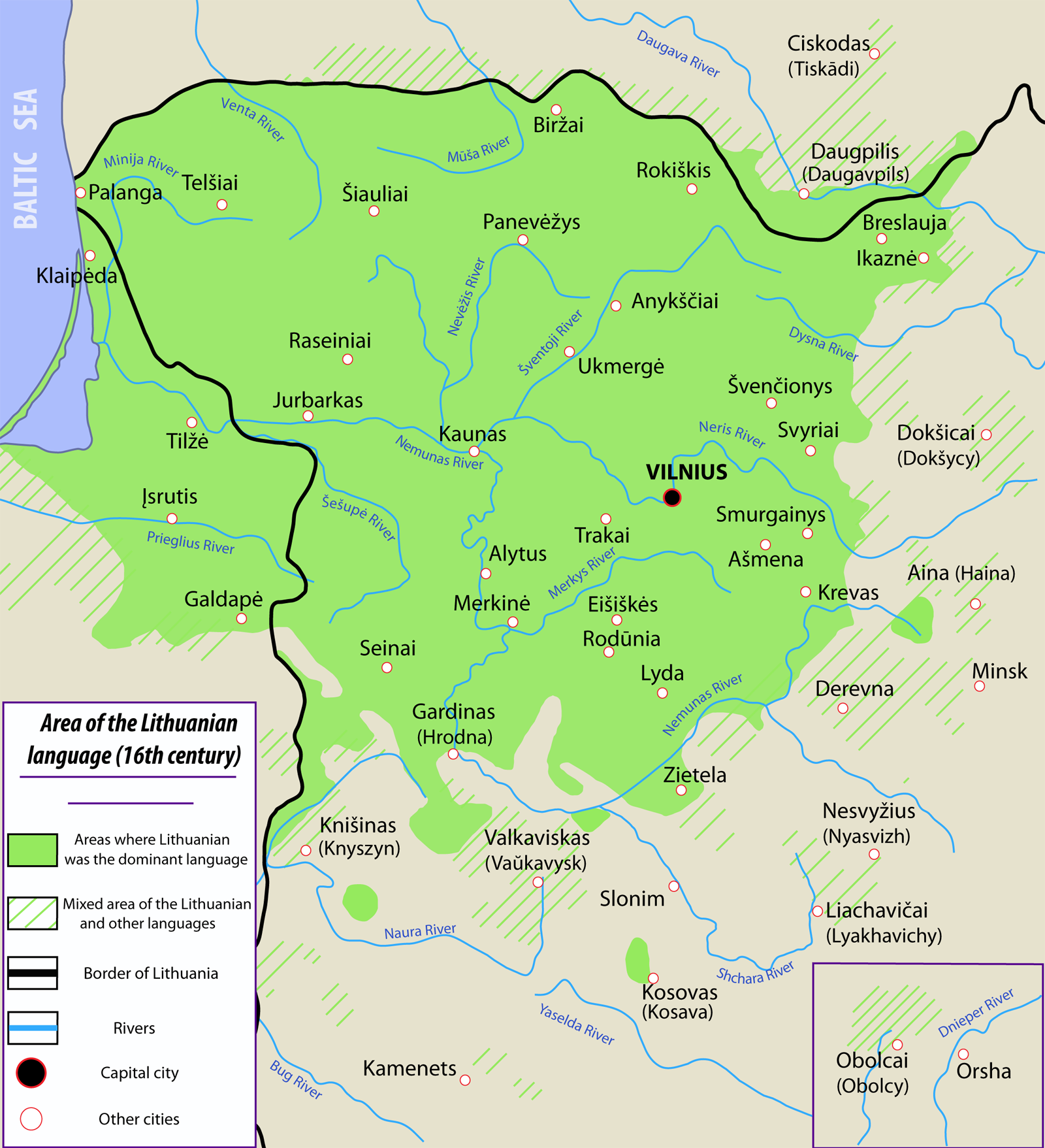
Within the 16th-century Grand Duchy of Lithuania, the Vilnius region was ethnically Lithuanian

== Ethnic and national background ==
Already in the 1st century, Lithuanian tribes inhabited Lithuania proper. Slavicisation of Lithuanians in eastern and southeastern Lithuania began in the 16th century. It is recorded that in 1554, Lithuanian, Polish and Church Slavonic were spoken in Vilnius. The Statutes of Lithuania, officially enforced from 1588 until 1840, forbid Polish nobility to buy estates in Lithuania, hence a mass migration of Poles into the Vilnius region was impossible. The Lithuanian nobility and Bourgeoisie was gradually Polonized over the 17th and 18th centuries.

Until the end of the 19th century, Peasants in eastern Lithuania proper were Lithuanians. This is attested by their un-Polonized surnames, and most Lithuanians in eastern Lithuania proper were Slavicized by schools and churches in the last quarter of the 19th century.

Polonization resulted in the mixed language spoken in the Vilnius region by Tutejszy, where it was known as "mowa prosta". It is not recognized as a dialect of Polish and borrows heavily from the Polish, Lithuanian and Belarusian languages. According to Polish professor Jan Otrębski's article published in 1931, the Polish dialect in the Vilnius Region and in the northeastern areas in general are very interesting variant of Polishness as this dialect developed in a foreign territory which was mostly inhabited by the Lithuanians who were Belarusized (mostly) or Polonized, and to prove this Otrębski provided examples of Lithuanianisms in the Tutejszy language. In 2015, Polish linguist Mirosław Jankowiak attested that many of the region's inhabitants who declare Polish nationality speak a Belarusian dialect which they call mowa prosta ('simple speech').

According to recent ethnographic research by Yury Vnukovich (2023), this situation represents an "ethnic anomaly": while local Lithuanians are identified primarily by their language, for the local Slavic-speaking population, their everyday language ("prostaya mova") is not a marker of ethnicity. Instead, residents identify as Poles based on other factors, primarily their Catholic faith (locally perceived as the "Polish faith") and their origin from the region. Vnukovich notes that "prostaya mova" is often stigmatized by its speakers as "uneducated," whereas standard Polish holds high prestige as a symbol of their identity, even if they do not speak it fluently in daily life.

== Ancient period ==
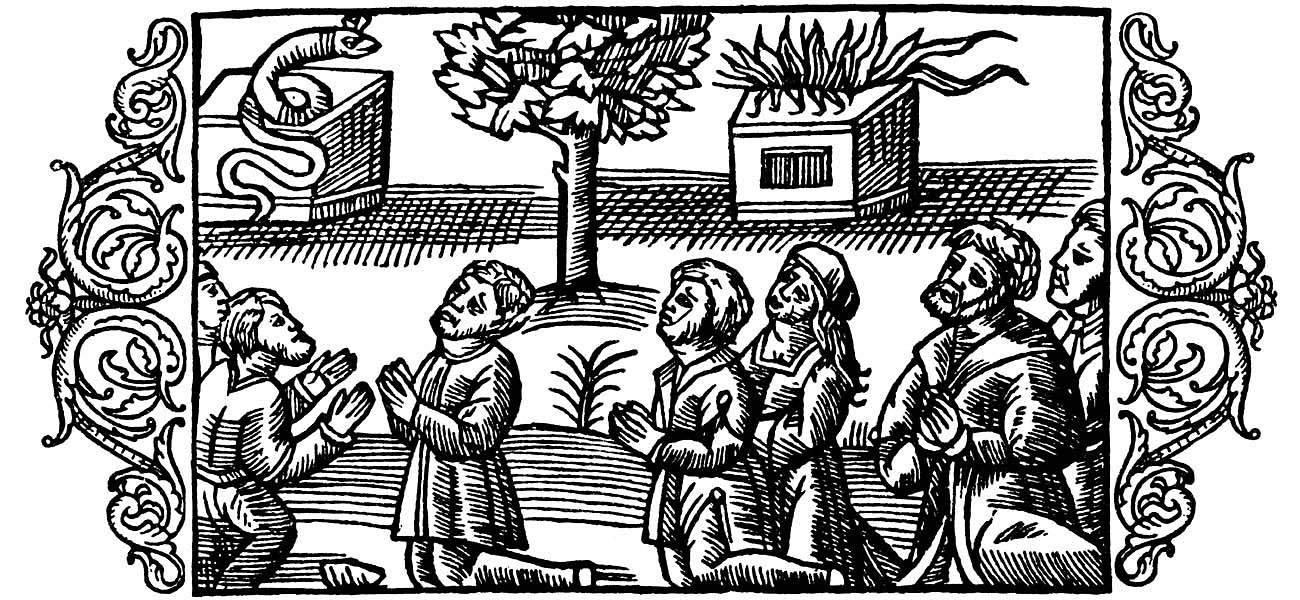
Pagan Lithuanians worshiping a grass snake, oak, and fire. From Olaus Magnus' A Description of the Northern Peoples, book 3, 1555

In the eldership of Vilkpėdė, remnants of a Magdalenian settlement were found which date to c. 10,000 BC. The confluence of the Neris and Vilnia was densely inhabited by the Brushed Pottery culture at c. 1,000 BC, which had a half-hectare fortified settlement on Gediminas' Hill. Tribes of this culture inhabited present-day Lithuania east of the Šventoji River and in western Belarus. The descendants of this culture were a Baltic tribe, the Aukštaitians (English: Highlanders). According to historian Antanas Čaplinskas, who researched the surnames of Vilnius residents, the city's oldest surviving surnames are Lithuanian. Pagan Lithuanians primarily lived at the northern foot of Gediminas' Hill and in the Crooked Castle. Kairėnai, Pūčkoriai and Naujoji Vilnia had large settlements during the first millennium AD. The most densely populated area was the confluence of the Neris and Vilnia, which had fortified homesteads.

== Medieval period ==
Vilnius was part of the Kingdom of Lithuania; King Mindaugas did not permanently live there, however, despite building Lithuania's first Catholic church for his coronation. The city began to develop in the late 13th century, during the reign of Grand Dukes Butvydas and Vytenis.

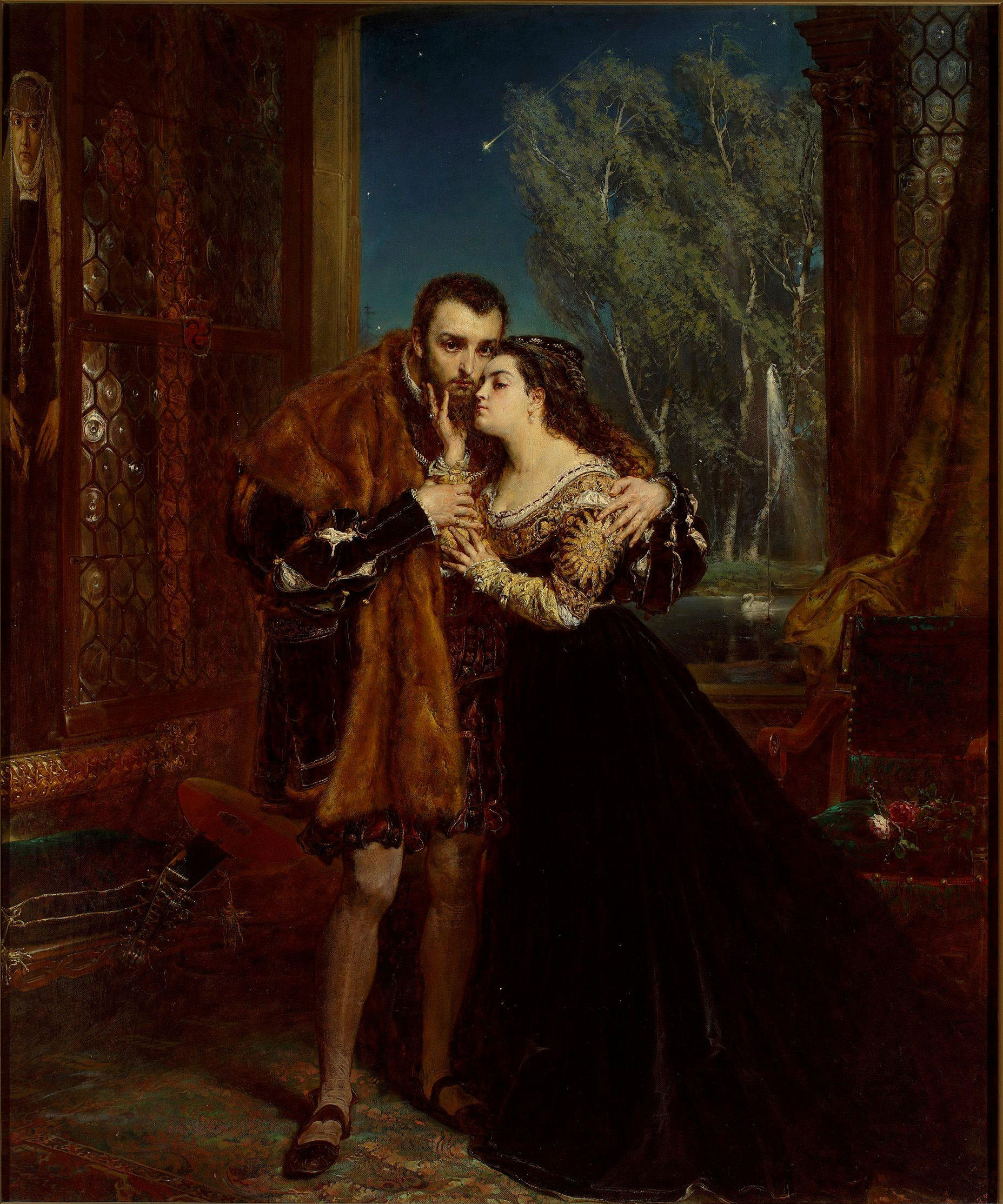
Grand Duke Sigismund II Augustus (Gediminas' male-line offspring) with his wife, the Grand Duchess Barbara Radziwiłł, in Vilnius. The city prospered during his reign.

Vilnius' growth is attributed to Grand Duke Gediminas, who invited knights, merchants, doctors, craftspeople and others to come to the duchy to practice their trades and religion without restriction during the 14th century. However, the city's growth was limited by Teutonic Order attacks and the 1389–1392 Lithuanian Civil War. Invited by Grand Duke Gediminas, merchants and craftsmen began moving to Vilnius from the cities of the German Hanseatic League, France, Italy and Spain; Lithuanian surnames were replaced with German, Polish, and Russian ones. In the late 14th century, during the reign of Grand Duke Algirdas, Vilnius had a Ruthenian quarter (Latin: Civitas Ruthenica) in present-day Latako and Rusų Streets. Trade between the Grand Duchy of Lithuania and the Ruthenian principalities was well-developed, with Ruthenian merchants and Ruthenian nobility living in the quarter. Vilnius' multiculturalism was increased by Grand Duke Vytautas the Great, who introduced Litvaks, Tatars and Crimean Karaites. After several centuries, the number of local residents in Vilnius was smaller than the number of newcomers. However, according to an analysis of the 1572 tax registers, Lithuania had 850,000 residents; 680,000 were Lithuanians.

== Early modern period ==
It became a multicultural city, with 14th-century sources noting that it consisted of a Great (Lithuanian) city and a Ruthenian one. By the 16th century, German merchants, artisans, Jews and Tatars had also settled in Vilnius. During the 16th– and 17th-century Reformation and Counter-Reformation, the city's Polish-speaking population began to grow; by the middle of the 17th century, most writing was in Polish.

During the Lithuanian Golden Age, Vilnius was a major city in the Polish–Lithuanian Commonwealth and home to the Lithuanian nobility; however, it was severely damaged by a 1610 fire. By the middle of the 17th century, most Lithuanian upper nobility was Polonized. Over time, the nobility of the former Polish–Lithuanian Commonwealth unified politically and started to consider themselves to be citizens of one common state.

After the 1655 Battle of Vilnius the city was under Russian control until 1661. During the Great Northern War, the Swedish Empire controlled Vilnius from 1702 to 1709. The occupation ended with the Great Northern War plague outbreak, and the city took over 50 years to recover. According to historian Vytautas Merkys, the city lost much of its old population under Swedish and Russian domination during the 17th and 18th centuries; although they were replaced by newcomers, Lithuanians continued to live in Vilnius.

== After the partitions of Polish–Lithuanian Commonwealth ==
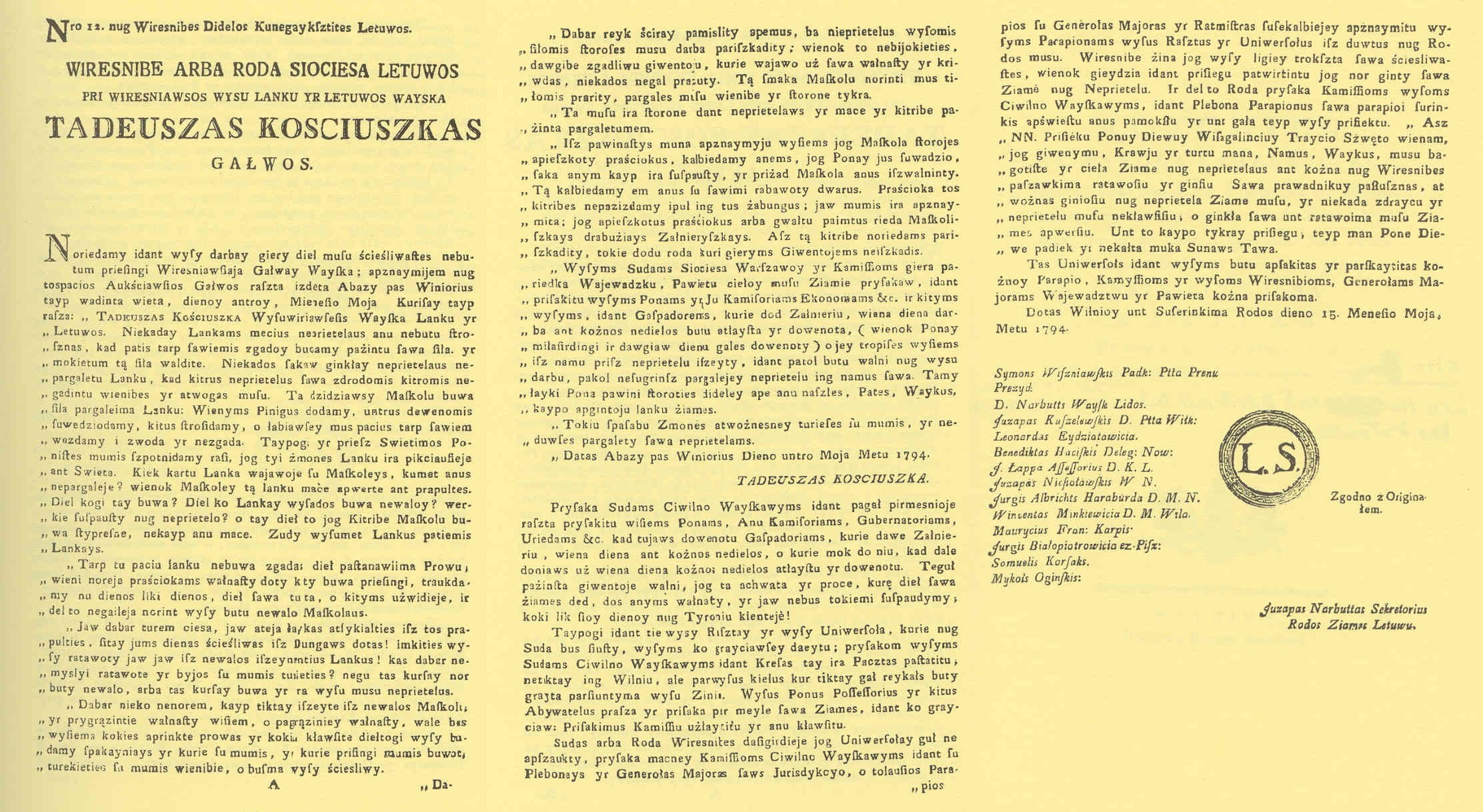
Manifesto of the 1794 Vilnius uprising, encouraging Lithuanians to defend the city against Russia. Its population fell precipitously.

According to the first Commonwealth census in 1790, the Vilnius Voivodeship had a population of 718,571 and Vilnius County had 105,896 residents; after the Second Partition, the Grand Duchy had a population of 1,333,493. The city's population fell to 17,500 in 1796 due to the 1794 Kościuszko Uprising, the last attempt to save it from Russian control. Vilnius was incorporated into the Russian Empire, and was its third-largest city at the beginning of the 19th century. The city was again affected by the 1830 November Uprising and the January Uprising in 1863.

Following the failed November uprising all traces of former Polish–Lithuanian statehood (like the Third Statute of Lithuania and Congress Poland) were replaced with Russian counterparts, ranging from the currency and units of measurement to offices of local administration. The failed January Uprising of 1863–64 further aggravated the situation, as the Russian authorities decided to pursue the policies of forcibly imposed Russification. The discrimination of local inhabitants included restrictions and bans on usage of Lithuanian (see Lithuanian press ban), Polish, Belarusian and Ukrainian (see Valuev circular) languages.

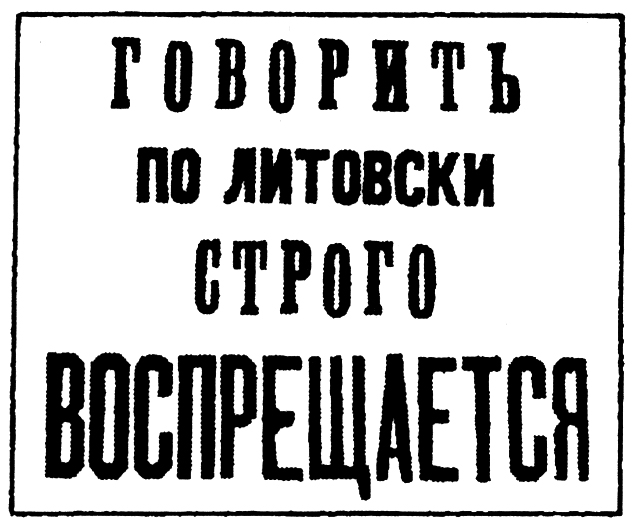
Official tsarist sign in Vilnius "Speaking Lithuanian is strictly forbidden" (second half of the 19th century)

According to the 1897 Russian census, Vilnius had a population of 154,532 residents and the Vilna Governorate had 1,561,713. Vilnius' population became ethnically less Lithuanian. In the Russian census of 1897, 2.1 percent identified as Lithuanian speakers; speakers of Polish (30.8% percent) and Yiddish (40 percent) were the city's largest linguistic groups. According to parish censuses in 1857–1858, the Lithuanian population was between 23.6 and 50 percent in the Vilna Governorate. In 1863, ethnographer Roderich von Erckert identified the governorate's largest ethnic group as Lithuanians (45.04 percent). Among the szlachta (nobility) in Vilnius in the 1897 census were 5,301 (46 percent) local nobles and 6,403 (54 percent) newcomers; of the newcomers, 24.1 percent were from the Vilna Governorate and the remainder from Grodno, Minsk, Vitebsk and Kovno Governorates, Vistula Land and other regions.

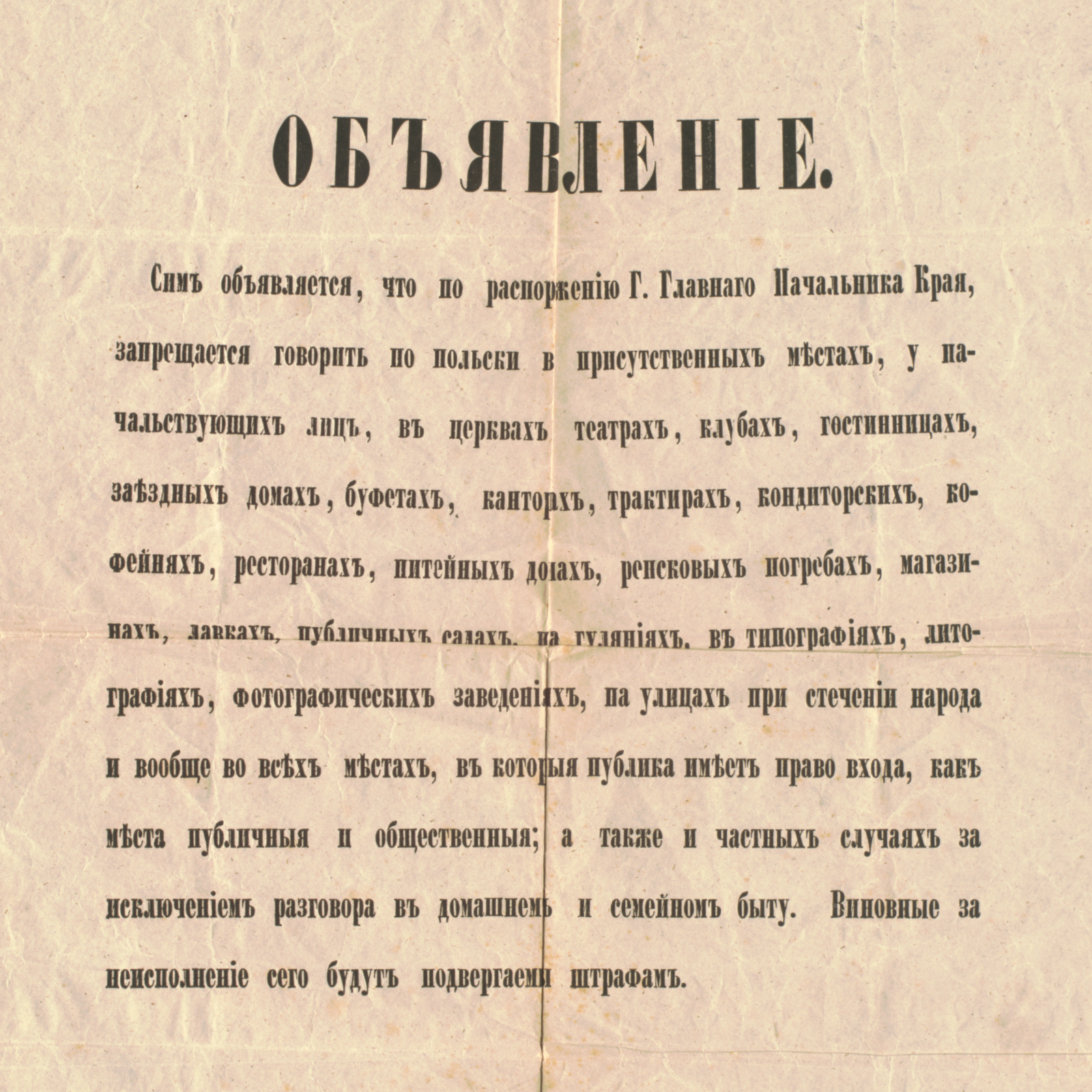
Official tsarist decree from 1864 forbidding to speak Polish in all public places in Vilnius

Despite that, the pre-19th-century cultural and ethnic pattern of the area was largely preserved. In the process of the pre-19th-century voluntary Polonization, much of the Lithuanian nobility adopted Polish language and culture. This was also true to the representatives of the then-nascent bourgeoisie class and the Catholic and Uniate clergy. At the same time, the lower strata of the society (notably the peasants) formed a multi-ethnic and multi-cultural mixture of Lithuanians, Poles, Jews, Tatars and Ruthenians, as well as a small yet notable population of immigrants from all parts of Europe, from Italy to Scotland and from the Low Countries to Germany.

== Statistics ==
Following is a list of various estimates, statistics and censuses that have been taken in the city of Vilnius and its region since the 19th century. The list is incomplete. Data are at times fragmentary.

=== Plater's statistics for the Vilnius Governorate in 1825 ===
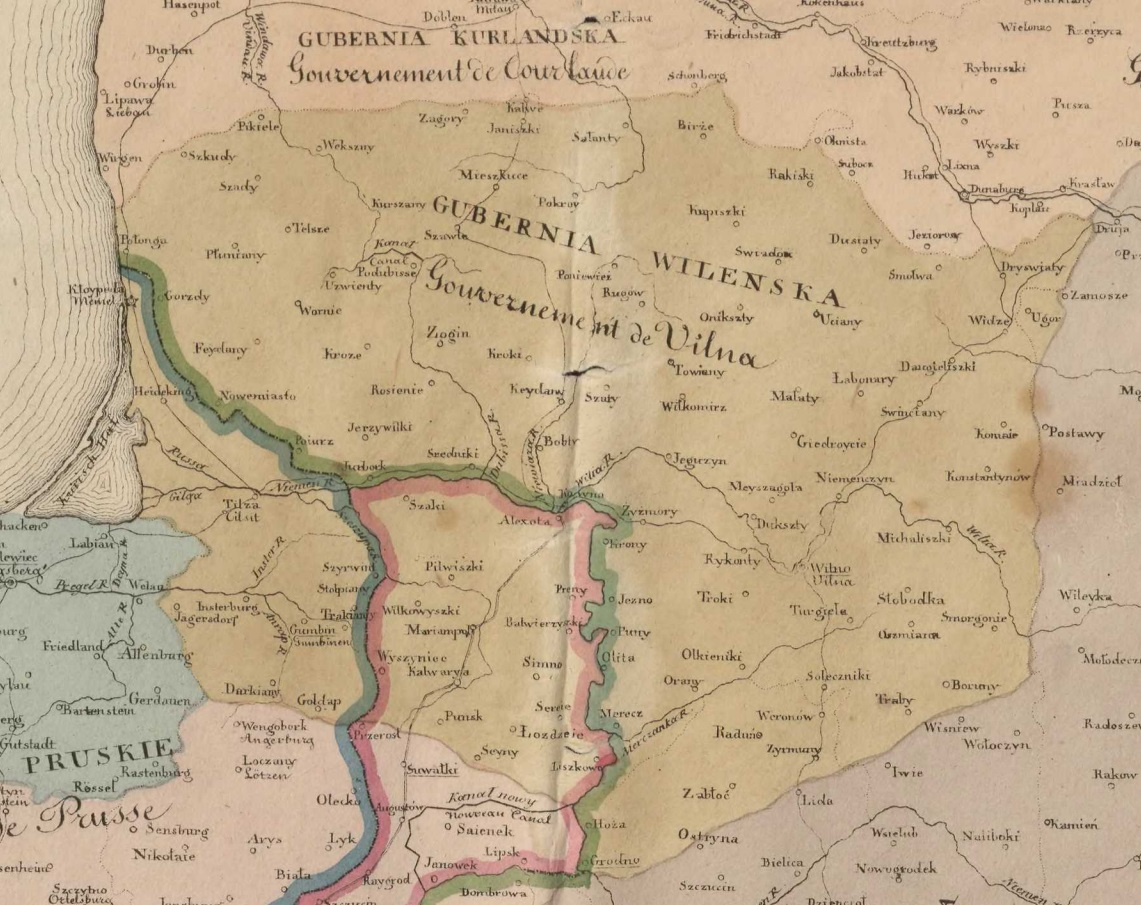
Map with an area (marked in greenish-yellow) where Lithuanian language was dominant in 1827

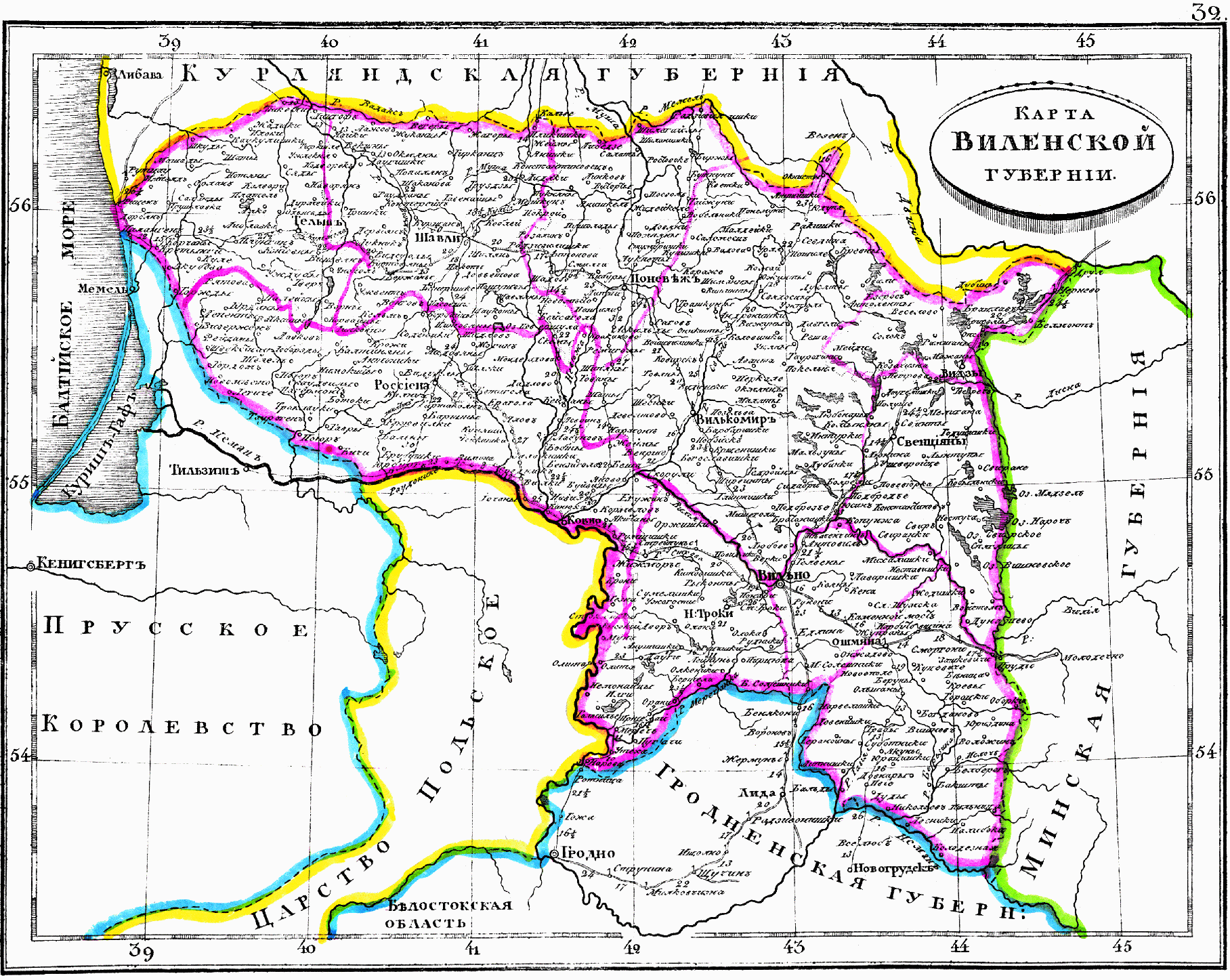
Map of the Vilnius Governorate according to its pre-1843

Count Stanisław Plater was the first one to publish approximate statistics on the ethnic makeup of the Vilnius governorate, which included the Vilnius region as well as many other parts of Lithuania, in 1825. His work's purpose was to show the area's indicative ethnic composition. In the case of the Vilnius Governorate, he concluded that it was majority Lithuanian.

Stanisław Plater's statistics in 1825
Language	People	Percentage of total
Lithuanian	780,000	65%
Yiddish	180,000	15%
Polish	100,000	8,3%
Russians	80,000	6,7%
Ruthenians	50,000	4,2%
Tatars	10,000	0,8%
Total	1,200,000	100%

Due to the lack of systematic primary data on nationalities, Plater resorted to comparing the revision censuses and religious distribution statistics to provide the general statistics on the population's ethnic distribution. He referred to nobles and townspeople, with the exception of soldiers and Jews, as Poles, whereas he separated the peasants into Lithuanians, Ruthenians, or Russians (which refers to the Old Believers). Overall, the total number of Catholics in the Vilnius Governorate was 930,000, i.e. ¾ of the population.

Plater's ethnic and social classification of the population also reflected the contemporary thought among the elite classes, where in addition to a class difference, an ethnic dividing line was also drawn compared to the lower classes. Thus, Plater categorically renamed the Lithuanians of the traditional political Lithuanian nation as Poles, whereas the lower classes in his view were termed as Lithuanians. A similar attitude could be found elsewhere in Europe, for example, the Hungarian nobility called itself as Natio Hungarica, in contrast to the commoners they called Magyars.

In 1856, a clear example of the ethno-social alienation between a Polish-speaking Lithuanian noble and a Lithuanian-speaking peasant was documented when the poet and writer Władysław Syrokomla, who traditionally considered himself a Lithuanian, traveled through the Dūkštos parish. Somewhere between the Geišiškės and Europa estates, Syrokomla spoke to a villager in Polish, but the latter replied in Lithuanian that he did not understand him, upon which Syrokomla disappointedly exclaimed that: "A Lithuanian in a Lithuanian land could not speak to a Lithuanian".

=== Lebedkin's statistic of 1862 ===
Vilnius Governorate (light green), 1843–1915

Lithuanian language area (1840s). A fragment of an ethnographic map of Europe (1847)

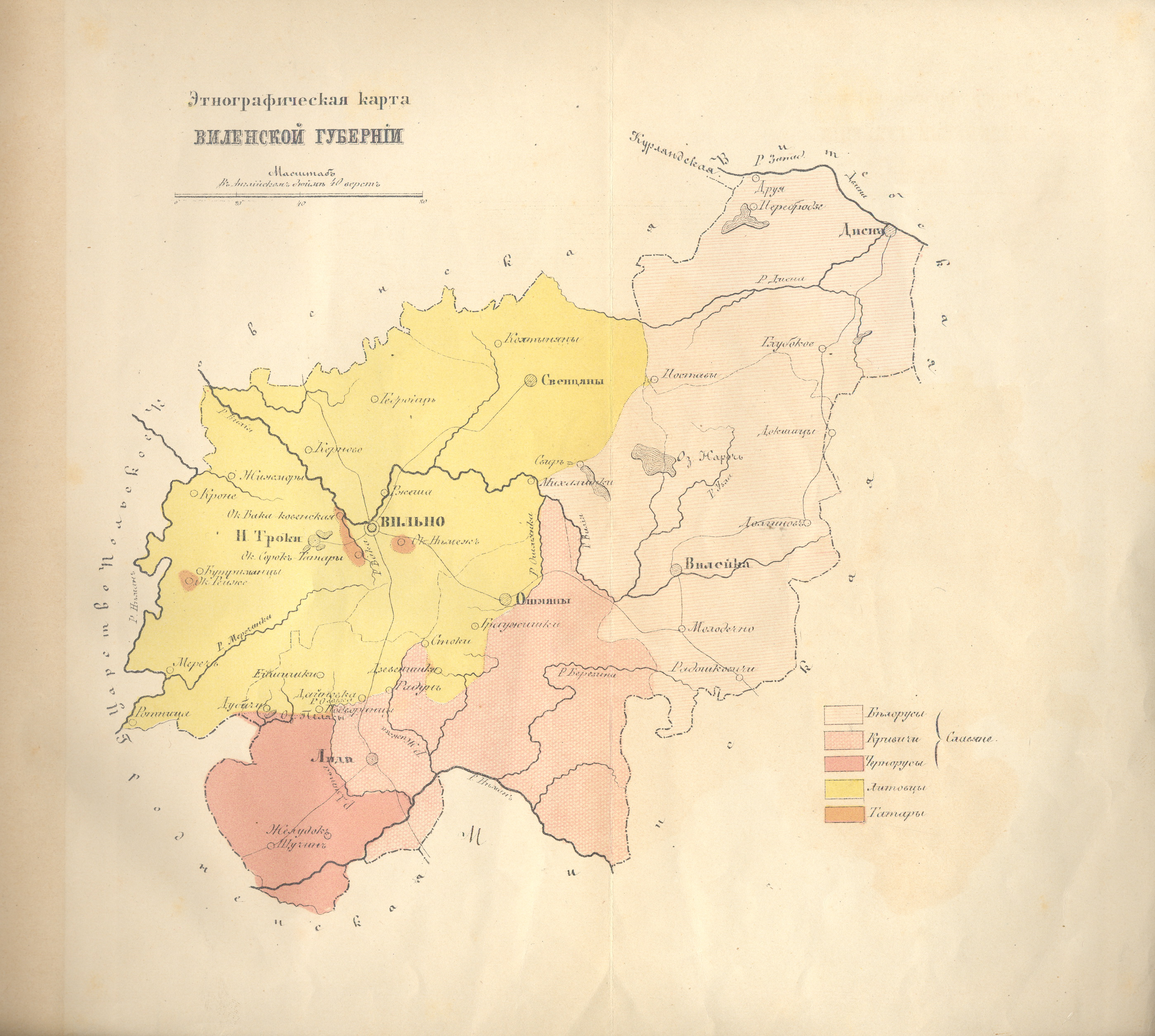
Ethnographic map of the Vilnius governorate in 1861

The first attempt at a statistical study of the ethnic structure of the Vilnius region was undertaken by Mikhail Lebedkin, who based his work on parish Catholic and Orthodox data. He published his findings in 1861 in the article On the Ethnic Composition of the Population of the Western Region of the Russian Empire in the Saint Petersburg–published scientific geographical journal Notes of the Imperial Russian Geographical Society. The largest percentage of Poles were in districts of Dysna (43.4%), Vilnius (34.5%) and Vileyka (22.1%).

Ethnic Composition of the Vilnius Governorate c. 1861 (according to Mikhail Lebedkin)
Ethnicity	Number	Percentage
Lithuanians	418,880	49.98%
Poles	154,386	18.42%
Belarusians	146,432	17.42%
Ukrainians	701	0.08%
Great Russians	14,950	1.79%
Krivichs	23,016	2.75%
Jews	76,802	9.16%
Germans	902	0.11%
Tatars	2,416	0.29%
Total	838,485	100%

Lebedkin believed that in earlier times only Lithuanians and Slavs lived in the Vilnius Governorate, and therefore, he considered the Lithuanians to be the governorate's indigenous population. He classified the Poles as part of the "Slavo-Russian" group. Lebedkin's data also included information on the number of Orthodox and Catholic believers, classifying all Poles, as well as portions of Lithuanians and Belarusians, as Catholics.

In 1862 a slightly revised version of the article was published in the Kyiv-based journal Herald of Southwestern and Western Russia, annotated by the editors with anti-Polish comments (Poles referred to as "insurgents").

=== Russian census of 1897 ===
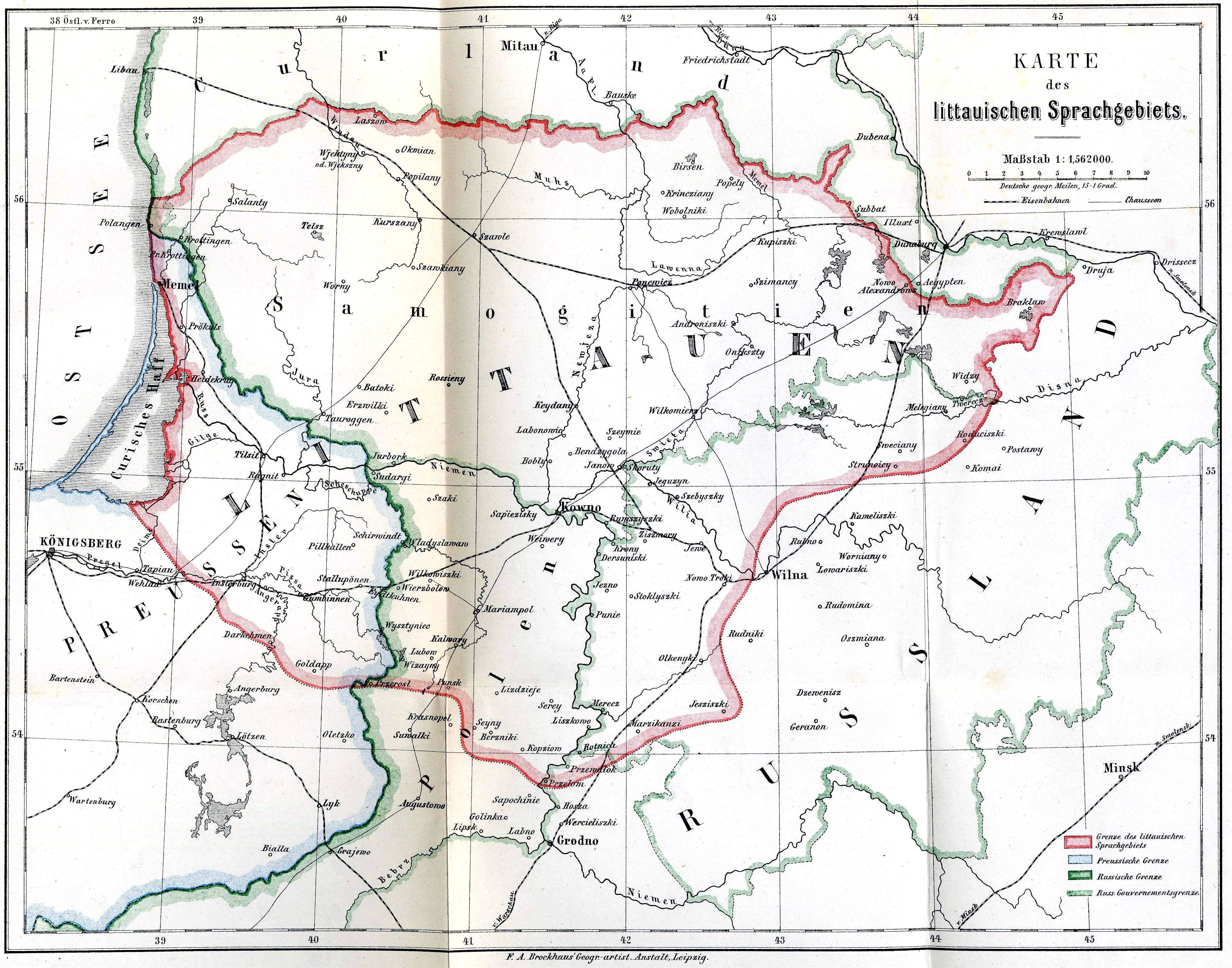
Lithuanian language area (without language islands outside the compact area). A map by Friedrich Kurschat (1876)

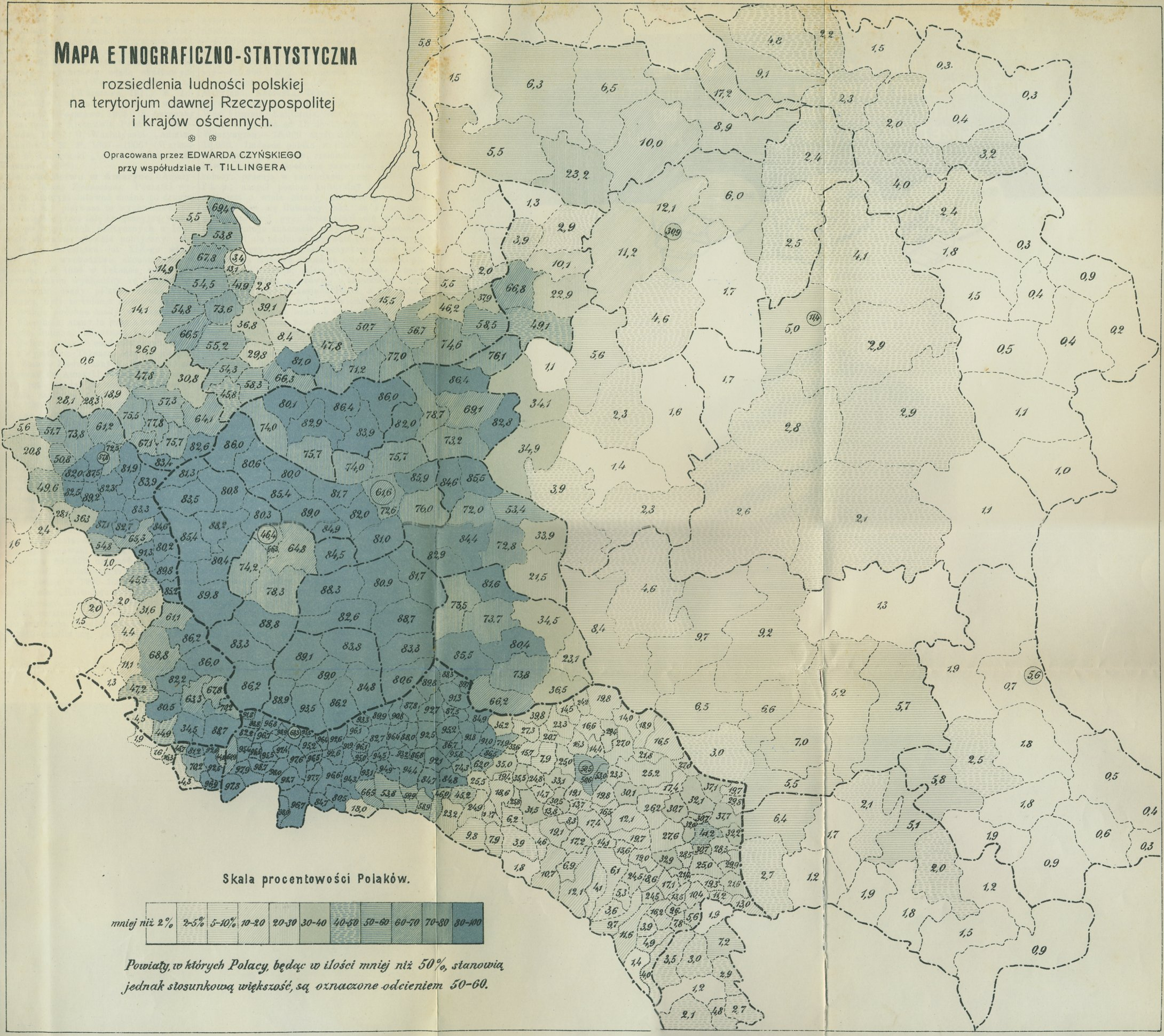
Distribution of Polish population (1912) incorporates data from the 1897 Russian census. A map by Henryk Merczyng

Map of areas where Polish was used as a primary language in 1916

In 1897, the first Russian Empire Census was held. The territory covered by the tables included parts of today's Belarus, that is, the Hrodna, Vitebsk and Minsk voblasts. Its results are currently criticised concerning ethnic composition because ethnicity was defined by the language spoken. In many cases, the reported language of choice was defined by general background (education, occupation) rather than ethnicity. Some results are also thought of as skewed since Pidgin speakers were assigned to nationalities arbitrarily. Moreover, the Russian military garrisons were counted in as permanent inhabitants of the area. Some historians point out the fact that the Russification policies and persecution of ethnic minorities in Russia were added to the notion to subscribe Belarusians, Lithuanians, Ukrainians and Poles to the category of Russians.

Russian Population Figures for the 1897 Census:

Area Language	City of Vilna		Vilensky Uyezd (no city)		Troksky Uyezd		Vilna Governorate	
Belarusian	6 514	4.2%	87 382	41.85%	32 015	15.86%	891 903	56.1%
German	2 170	1.4%	674	0.32%	457	0.22%	3 873	0.2%
Lithuanian	3 131	2.1%	72 899	34.92%	118 153	59.01%	279 720	17.6%
Polish	47 795	30.9%	25 293	12.11%	22 884	10.99%	130 054	8.2%
Russian	30 967	20.0%	6 939	3.32%	9 314	4.22%	78 623	4.9%
Tatar	722	0.5%	49	0.02%	799	0.19%	1 969	0.1%
Ukrainian	517	0.3%	40	0.02%	154	0.08%	919	0.1%
Yiddish	61 847	40.0%	15 377	7.37%	19 398	9.32%	202 374	12.7%
Other	682	0.4%	89	0.06%	155	0.10%	1 119	0.1%
Total	154 532	100%	208 781	100%	203 401	100%	1 591 207	100%

=== 1916 German census ===
During World War I, all of modern-day Lithuania and Poland was occupied by the German Army. On 9 March 1916, the German military authorities organized a census to determine the ethnic composition of their newly conquered territories. Many Belarusian historians note that the Belarusian minority is not noted among the inhabitants of the city.

German censuses of Vilnius 1915-1917
Nationality	1 Nov 1915	9-11 Mar 1916		14 Dec - 10 Jan 1917	
Poles	—	70 629	50,15%	74 466	53,65%
Jews	—	61 265	43,50%	57 516	41,44%
Belarusians	—	1 917	1,36%	611	0,44%
Lithuanians	—	3 699	2,63%	2 909	2,10%
Russians	—	2 080	1,48%	2 212	1,59%
Germans	—	1 000	0,71%	880	0,63%
Other	—	300	0,21%	193	0,14%
Overall	142 063	140 840		138 787	

The census was organised by Oberbürgermeister Eldor Pohl. Representatives of the local population were included in the commission. Poles were represented by Jan Boguszewski, Feliks Zawadzki and Władysław Zawadzki, Jews by Nachman Rachmilewicz, Simon Rosenbaum and Zemach Shabad, Lithuanians by Antanas Smetona, Aleksandras Stulginskis and Augustinas Janulaitis. Belarusians did not have any representation. Each member of the commission was responsible for the census in one of the nine parts into which the city was divided, and was accompanied by two representatives of other nationalities. As a result each part of the city was entrusted to a commission consisting of one Pole, one Jew and one Lithuanian. Each commission had an ethnically mixed team of clerks at their disposal. Overall 425 of them were engaged in carrying out the census; 200 of them were Jews, 150 Poles, 50 Lithuanians and 25 Belarusians. Many Lithuanians at the time pointed to the fact that many of the clerks employed in carrying out the census were Polish citizens of Germany, mainly from Poznań, so the results of the census were unreliable.

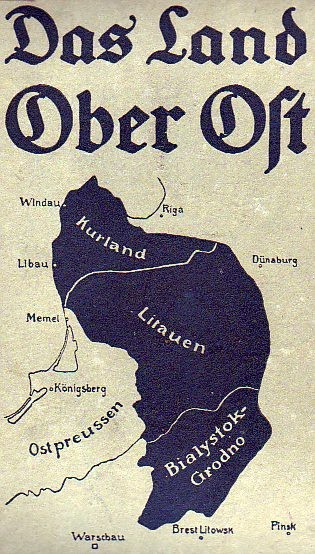
Ober Ost, 1916

The census was carried out from March 9 through March 11; for five more days people were allowed to correct their declarations and make complaints. The main complaint was that many of the clerks, mainly Jewish ones, did not know any language other than Yiddish or Russian, often also didn't know latin script, which led to many mistakes. Also, many people simply refused to answer questions they didn't understand. There were also instances when, for political reasons, people were registered as belonging to different nationality than they declared. According to census data, the city was inhabited by 140,480 people, 76,196 of them were Roman Catholics (54.10%), 70,692 were Polish (50.15%). The second group were Jews, 61,265 declared such nationality (43.5%) and 61,233 declared Judaism as their religion (43.47%). The population of the city decreased from 205,300 in 1909 to just 140,800 registered in the new census. Almost all Russians had left the city with the army; their percentage shrank from 20% in 1909 to just 1.46% now.

In comparison with the first German census (which was carried out in November 1915 and did not ask about nationality), the number of inhabitants decreased by 1,223 from 142,063. The most striking result was the difference in the number of inhabitants and the number of people registered for food ration stamps. According to responsible office in March 1916 there was 170 836 people in the city eligible to receive food rations, which gave the difference of about 18%. German authorities alarmed by the results reformed the rationing system and in October the number of stamps was reduced so the number of registered persons decreased to 142 218. Given people were rather leaving Vilnius — refugees were going back to their homes, people were trying to find better life conditions in the countryside — the numbers were still most likely inflated. In a result Germans decided to carry out additional census.

Every inhabitant of Vilnius was ordered to appear in the right office with a passport and a ration card. In front of ethnically mixed commission he needed to declare his and his family nationality and religion, and also declare the number of people in the household. After that he was given a new ration card where such information was included. Results were even more favourable for Poles, their number increased to 74,466 (53.65%), while the overall number of people in the city decreased to 138,787.

Area Nationality	City of Wilna		Wilna county (no city)		Occupied Lithuania/ Ober Ost^{A}	
Belarusians	1 917	1.4%	559	0.9%	60 789	6.4%
Lithuanians	3 699	2.6%	2 713	4.3%	175 932	18.5%
Poles	70 629	50.2%	56 632	89.8%	552 401	58.0%
Russians	2 030	1.4%	290	0.5%	12 121	1.2%
Jews	61 265	43.5%	2 711	4.3%	139 716	14.7%
Other	1 300	1.0%	–	–	–	–
Total	140 840	100%	63 076	100%	950 899	100%

^{A}Data collected from the following districts (Kreise): Suwałki, Augustów, Sejny, Grodno, Grodno-city, Płanty, Lida, Radun, Vasilishki, Vilnius-city, Vilnius, Širvintos, Pabradė, Merkinė, Molėtai, Kaišiadorys, and Švenčionėliai.

A similar census was organized for all of the territories of German-occupied Lithuania, and the northern border of the territory was more or less correspondent to that of present-day Lithuania; however, its southern border ended near Brest-Litovsk, and included the city of Białystok.

=== 1919 Polish census ===
The Polish census of 1919 found the following ethnic structure of what it called Wilno District (ten counties and two cities):

County	Population	Poles	Belarusians	Lithuanians	Jews	Russians	"Locals"	Tatars	Latvians	Not reported
Wilno City	128,954	72,416	1,781	2,920	46,559	5,262	0	16	0	0
Wilno County	184,218	160,762	626	13,864	6,665	2,110	0	45	0	146
Brasław	82,513	43,335	12,622	12,367	3,254	8,348	0	27	1,398	1,162
Dzisna	193,263	74,612	46,381	1,885	5,280	65,078	0	27	0	0
Wilejka	213,424	64,549	123,332	122	9,453	11,173	2	157	0	4,636
Święciany	139,692	61,854	18,727	38,529	6,524	5,850	2,888	133	0	5,187
Oszmiana	189,390	129,165	11,195	54	10,639	1,037	33,300	173	0	3,827
Nowogródek	95,907	13,833	72,398	1	6,974	1,470	0	302	0	929
Troki	92,831	49,947	242	36,748	3,805	903	899	273	0	14
Lida	186,060	141,479	27,804	4,203	6,329	2,610	0	25	0	3,610
Grodno City	28,165	9,255	2,123	23	16,587	166	0	1	0	10
Grodno County	99,087	53,549	33,160	1,546	10,534	161	0	137	0	0
Total	1,633,504	874,756	350,391	112,262	132,603	104,168	37,089	1,316	1,398	19,521

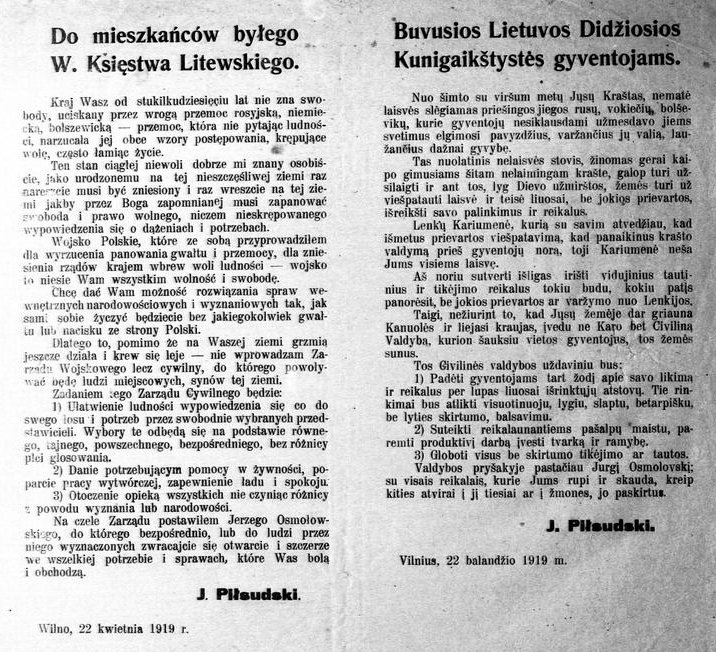
Piłsudski's bilingual Appeal to the citizens of former Grand Duchy of Lithuania of April 1919

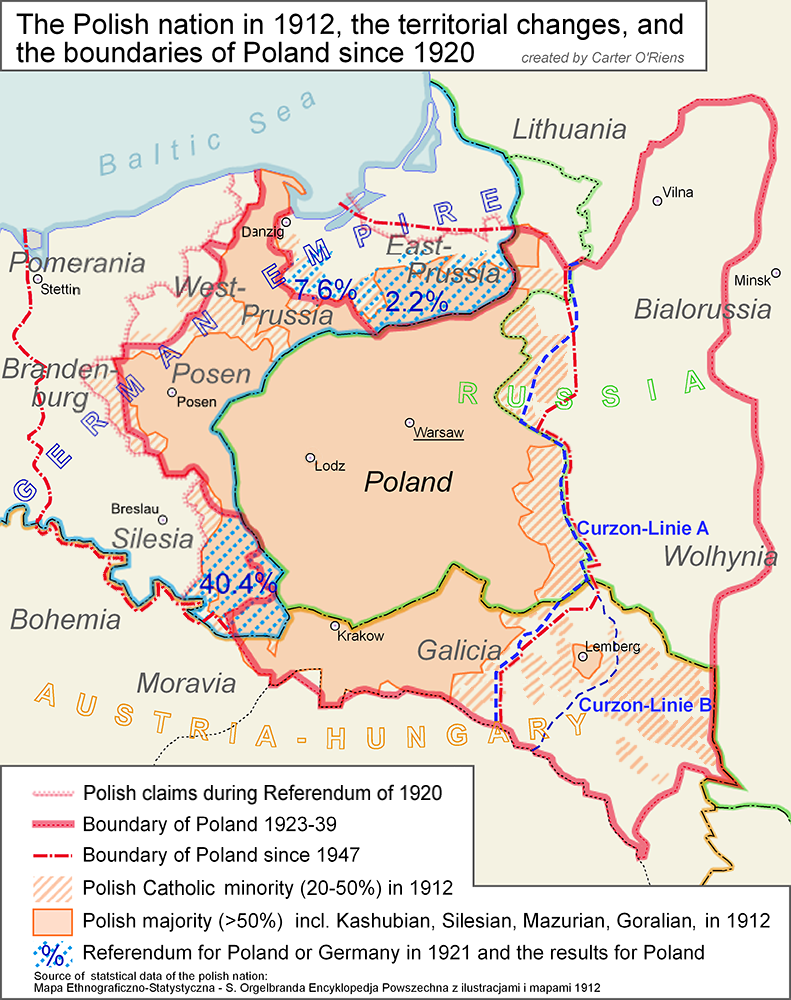
Polish pre-WWI ethnographic boundaries and territorial claims

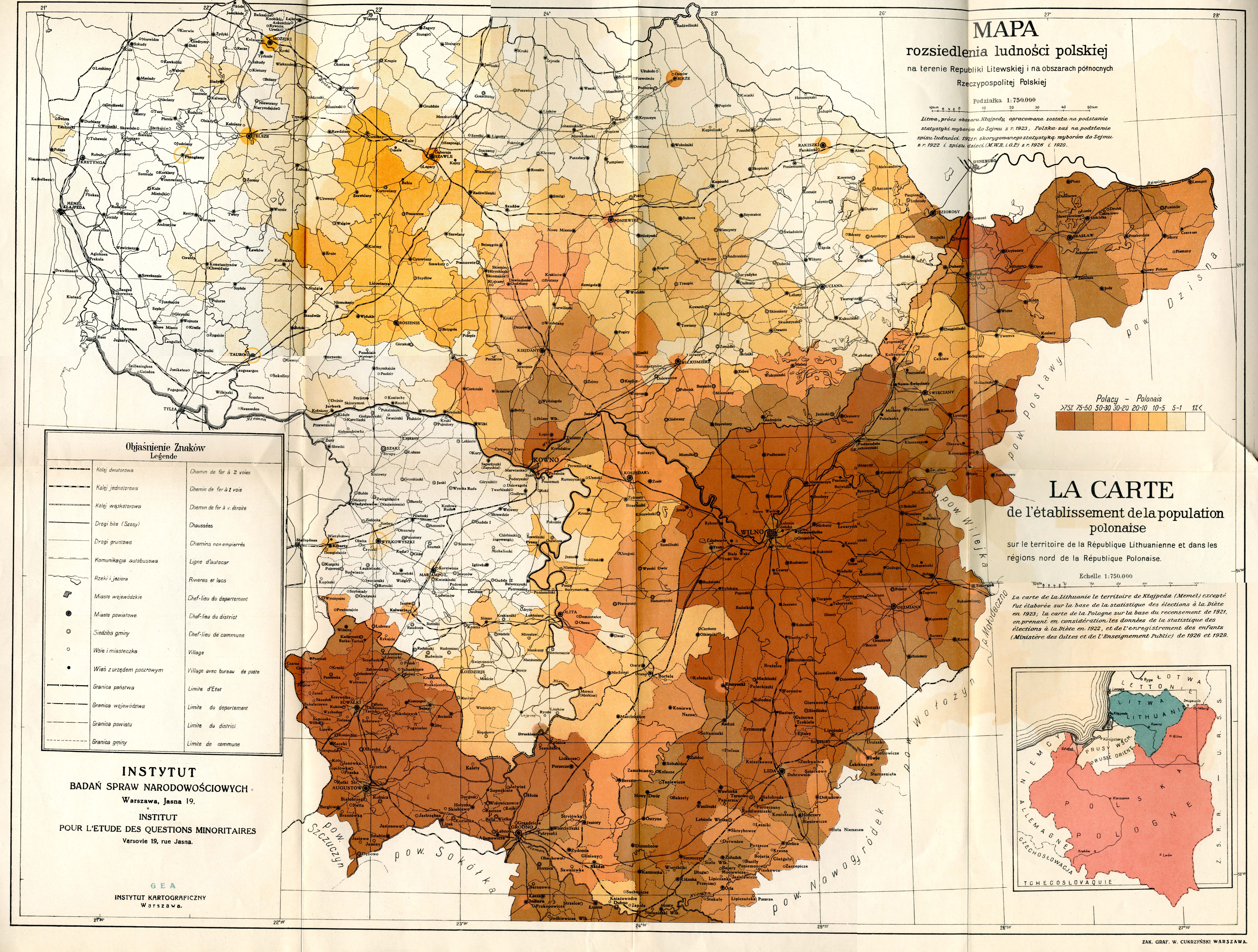
Polish state-sponsored cartographic propaganda from the Institute for the Study of Nationalities from 1929, claiming to show the number of Poles in Lithuania, extrapolated from the elections to the Lithuanian Seimas in 1923, the Polish Sejm in 1922 and censuses in 1921

=== 1921–1923 Polish census ===
The Peace of Riga, which ended the Polish–Soviet War, determined Poland's eastern border. In 1921, the first Polish census was held in territories under Polish control. However, Central Lithuania, seized in 1920 by General Lucjan Żeligowski's forces after a staged mutiny, was outside of de jure Poland. Poland annexed the short-lived state on 22 March 1922.

As a result, the Polish census of 20 September 1921 covered only parts of the future Wilno Voivodeship area, that is the communes of Breslauja, Duniłowicze, Dysna and Vileika. The remaining part of the territory of Central Lithuania (that is the communes of Vilnius, Ašmena, Švenčionys and Trakai) was covered by the additional census organised there in 1923. The tables on the right give the combined numbers for Wilno Voivodeship's area (Administrative Area of Wilno), taken during both the 1921 and 1923 censuses. It is known that Lithuanians were forced to declare their nationality as Polish.

Source: 1921–1923 Polish census

Area Nationality	City of Wilno 1923		Administrative Area of Wilno	
Belarusians	3 907	2.3%	–	25.7%
Lithuanians	1 445	0.9%	–	–
Poles	100 830	60.2%	–	57.9%
Russians	4 669	2.8%	–	–
Jews	56 168	33.5%	–	8.1%
Other	435	0.26%	–	8.3%
Total	167 454	100%	–	100%

=== Polish census of 1931 ===
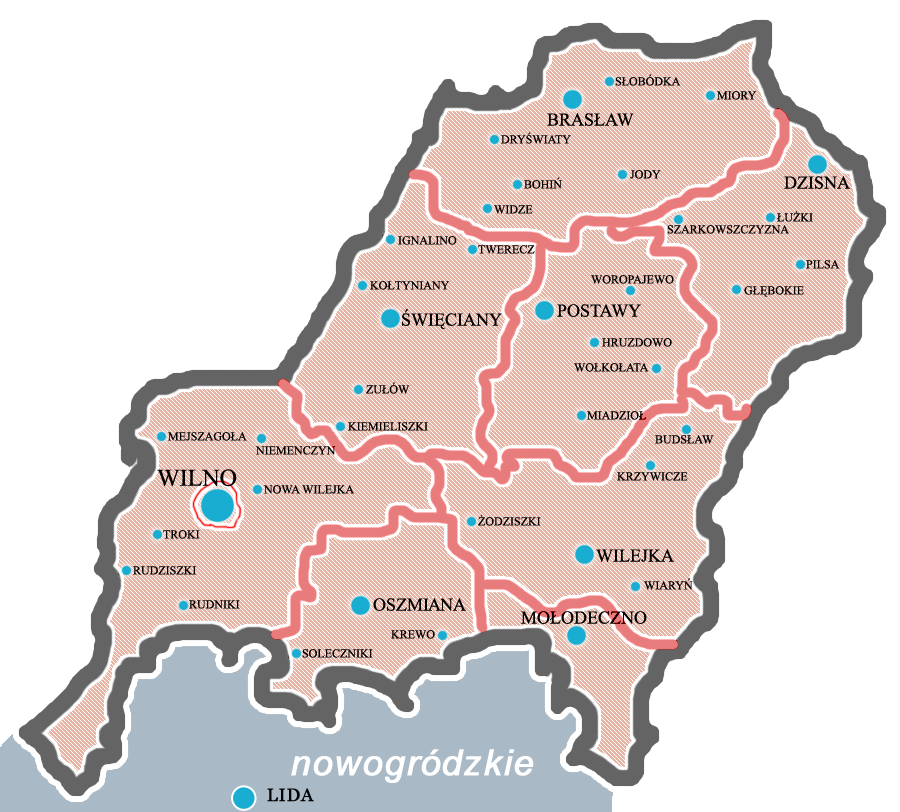
Wilno voivodeship

The 1931 Polish census was the first Polish census to measure the population of the whole Wilno and Wilno Voivodeship at once. It was organised on 9 December 1931 by the Main Statistical Office of Poland. However, in 1931 the question of nationality was replaced by two separate questions of religion worshipped and the language spoken at home. Because of that, it is sometimes argued that the "language question" was introduced to diminish the number of Jews, some of whom spoke Polish rather than Yiddish or Hebrew. The table on the right shows the census findings on language. Wilno voivodeship did not include Druskininkai area and included just a small part of Varėna area where the majority of inhabitants were Lithuanians. Even then, some Lithuanians were recorded as belonging to the Polish nationality. The voivodeship, however, included Brelauja, Dysna, Molodečno, Ašmena, Pastovys and Vileika counties which now belong to Belarus.

In stark contrast to the Polish interwar censuses, the Vilnius region was the site of 30 Lithuanian Kindergartens, 350 Lithuanian Primary schools, 2 Lithuanian gymnasiums and a Lithuanian teacher's seminary, all of which indicate that there were far more Lithuanians in the Vilnius region than the censuses accounted for.

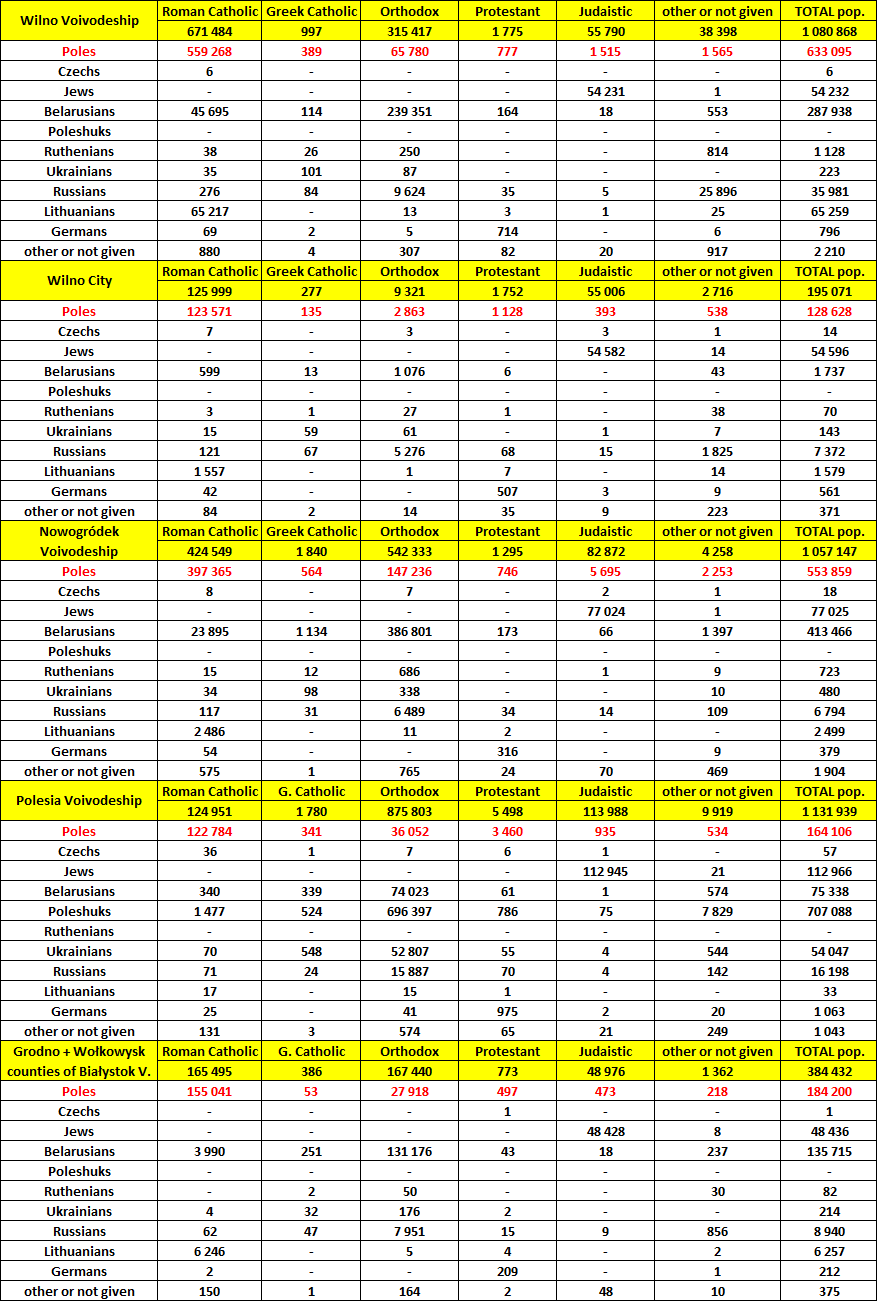
Linguistic (mother tongue) and religious structure of Northern Kresy (today parts of Belarus and Lithuania) according to the Polish census of 1931

Polish Second General Population Census of 9 December 1931.
Area Language	City of Wilno		Wilno-Troki county (no city)		Wilno and the Wilno-Troki county		Wilno voivodeship	
Belarusian	1 700	0.9%	5 549	2.6%	7 286	1.8%	289 675	22.7%
German	561	0.3%	171	0.1%	732	0.2%	1 357	0.1%
Lithuanian	1 579	0.8%	16 934	7.9%	18 513	4.5%	66 838	5.2%
Polish	128 628	65.9%	180 546	84.2%	309 174	75.5%	761 723	59.7%
Russian	7 372	3.8%	3 714	1.7%	11 086	2.7%	43 353	3.4%
Yiddish and Hebrew	54 596	28.0%	6 508	3.0%	61 104	14.9%	108 828	8.5%
Other	598	0.3%	1 050	0.5%	1 648	0.4%	4 165	0.3%
Total	195 071	100%	214 472	100%	409 543	100%	1 275 939	100%

=== Lithuanian census of 1939 ===
Lithuanians troops who entered Vilnius in 1939 had to resort to French and German to communicate with the city's inhabitants. According to the official Lithuanian data from 1939, Lithuanians made up 6% of Vilnius population. A Lithuanian sanitary platoon didn't find any Lithuanian-speaking villages despite traveling for two weeks in the surrounding countryside. In December 1939, shortly after the return of Lithuanian control to what it claimed was its capital city, the Lithuanian authorities organized a new census in the area. However, the census is often criticized as skewed, intending to prove Lithuania's historical and moral rights to the disputed area rather than determine the factual composition. Lithuanian figures from that period are criticized as significantly inflating the number of Lithuanians. People receiving Lithuanian citizenship were pressured to declare their nationality as being Lithuanian rather than Polish.

=== German-Lithuanian census of 1942 ===
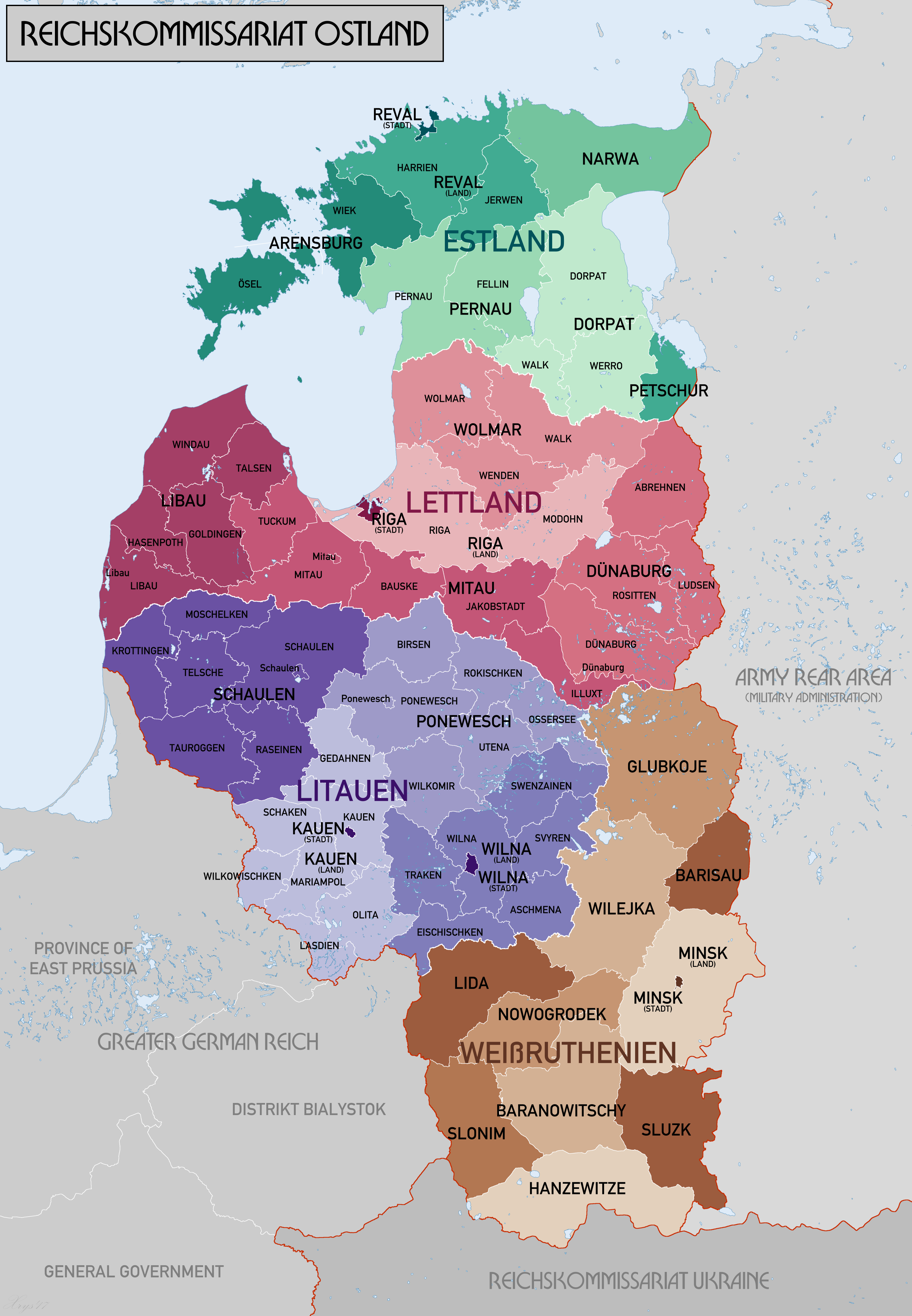
Administrative division of Reichskommissariat Ostland. The city of Vilnius (Wilna-Stadt) and the region of Vilnius (Wilna-Land) are separate divisions

After the outbreak of the German-Soviet War in 1941, the area of eastern Lithuania was quickly seized by the Wehrmacht. On 27 May 1942 a new census was organised by the German authorities and the local Lithuanian collaborators. The details of the methodology used are unknown and the results of the census are commonly believed to be an outcome of the racial theories and beliefs of those who organised the census rather than the actual ethnic and national composition of the area. Among the most notable features is a complete lack of data on the Jewish inhabitants of the area (see Ponary massacre for explanation) and a much lowered number of Poles, as compared to all the earlier censuses. However, Wilna-Gebiet did not include Breslauja, Dysna, Maladečina, Pastovys and Vileika counties but included Svieriai district. That explains the decline in the number of Belarusians in Wilna-Gebiet.

Population estimated by the Germans on 1 January 1941
Area Nationality	City of Wilna		Wilna county		Wilna city and county	
Belarusians	5 348	2.55%	9 735	6.36%	15 083	4.16%
Germans	524	0.25%	168	0.11%	692	0.19%
Lithuanians	51 111	24.37%	66 048	43.15%	117 159	32.29%
Poles	87 855	41.89%	71 436	46.67%	159 291	43.91%
Russians	4 090	1.95%	1 684	1.10%	5 774	1.59%
Jews	58 263	27.78%	3 505	2.29%	61 768	17.03%
Other	2 538	1.21%	490	0.32%	3 028	0.83%
Total	209 729	100%	153 066	100%	362 795	100%

Einsatzgruppen population report on 1 July 1941

Nationality	City of Vilna
Lithuanians	30%
Jews	40%
Poles, Belarusians, Russians	30%

Nationality census of Lithuania of 27 May 1942
Area Nationality	City of Wilna		Wilna county (no city)		Wilna city and county		Wilna-Land and city	
Belarusians	3 029	2.11%	5 998	4.00%	9 027	3.07%	80 853	10.87%
Germans	476	0.33%	52	0.03%	528	0.18%	771	0.10%
Lithuanians	29 480	20.54%	73 752	49.13%	103 232	35.17%	310 449	41.75%
Poles	103 203	71.92%	67 054	44.67%	170 257	57.99%	324 750	43.67%
Russians	6 012	1.95%	2 713	1.81%	8 725	2.97%	23 222	3.12%
Jews	–	–	–	–	–	–	–	–
Latvians	78	0.05%	19	0.01%	97	0.03%	182	0.02%
Other	1 220	0.37%	515	0.20%	1 735	0.59%	3 452	0.46%
Total	143 498	100%	150 105	100%	293 601	100%	743 582	100%

=== Soviet data from 1944 to 1945 ===
Vilnius' registered population was about 107,000. People who moved to the city during the German occupation, military personnel, and temporary residents were not included in the population count. According to the data from the beginning of 1945, the total population of Vilnius, Švenčionys and Trakai districts amounted to 325,000 people, half of them Poles. About 90% of the Vilnius Jewish community had perished in the Holocaust. All Vilnius Poles were required to register for resettlement, and about 80% of them were relocated to Poland.

Soviet census of late 1944-early 1945:^{A}

Area Nationality	City of Vilnius		Vilnius district		Trakai district		Švenčionys district	
Belarusians	2 062	1.9%	800	–	–	–	–	–
Lithuanians	7 958	7.5%	7 500	–	~70 000	–	69 288	–
Poles	84 990	79.8%	105 000	–	~40 000	–	19 108	–
Russians	8 867	8.3%	2 600	–	~3 500	–	2 542	–
Ukrainians	~500	–	–	–	–	–	–	–
Jews	~1 500	–	–	–	–	–	–	–
Total	106 497	100%	115 900	100%	~114 000	100%	93 631	100%

^{A}In the Trakai and Švenčionys districts, a certain number of Belarusians was included into the categories of Russians and Poles.

=== Soviet census of 1959 ===
During the 1944-1946 period, about 50% of the registered Poles in Lithuania were transferred to Poland. Dovile Budryte estimates that about 150,000 people left the country. During 1955–1959 period, another 46,600 Poles left Lithuania. However, Lithuanian historians estimate that about 10% of people who left for Poland were ethnic Lithuanians. While the removal of Poles from Vilnius constituted a priority for the Lithuanian communist authorities, the depolonization of the countryside was limited due to the concerns of depopulation and agricultural labour force deficit. The population transfers and migration processes resulted in the formation of territorial ethnic segregation, with Lithuanians and Russians prevailing in Vilnius and Poles predominating in the city's surroundings.

These are the results of the migration to Poland and the growth of the city due to industrial development and the Soviet Union policy.

1959 Soviet census:

Area Nationality	City of Vilnius		Vilnius Region	
Belarusians	14 700	6.2%	–	–
Lithuanians	79 400	33.6%	–	–
Poles	47 200	20.0%	–	–
Russians	69 400	29.4%	–	–
Tatars	496	0.2%	–	–
Ukrainians	6 600	2.8%	–	–
Jews	16 400	7.2%	–	–
Other	–	0.8%	–	–
Total	236 100	100%	–	–

=== Soviet census of January 1989 ===
Poles accounted for 63.6% of the population in Vilnius rayon/county (currently Vilnius district municipality, excluding the city of Vilnius itself), and 82.4% of the population in Šalčininkai rayon/county (currently known as Šalčininkai district municipality).

Area Nationality	City of Vilnius		Vilnius Region	
Belarusians	–	5.3%	–	–
Lithuanians	–	50.5%	–	–
Poles	–	18.8%	–	–
Russians	–	20.2%	–	–
Tatars	–	0.2%	–	–
Ukrainians	–	2.3%	–	–
Jews	–	1.6%	–	–
Other	–	1.1%	–	–
Total	582 500	100%	–	–

=== Lithuanian census of 2001 ===
Poles in Lithuania (2001)

2001 Lithuanian census:

Area Nationality	Vilnius city municipality		Vilnius district municipality	
Belarusians	22 555	4.1%	3 869	4.4%
Lithuanians	318 510	57.5%	19 855	22.4%
Poles	104 446	18.9%	54 322	61.3%
Russians	77 698	14.0%	7 430	8.4%
Ukrainians	7 159	1.3%	619	0.7%
Jews	2 785	0.5%	37	<0.01%
Other	2 528	0.5%	484	0.5%
Total	553 904	100%	88 600	100%

=== Lithuanian census of 2011 ===
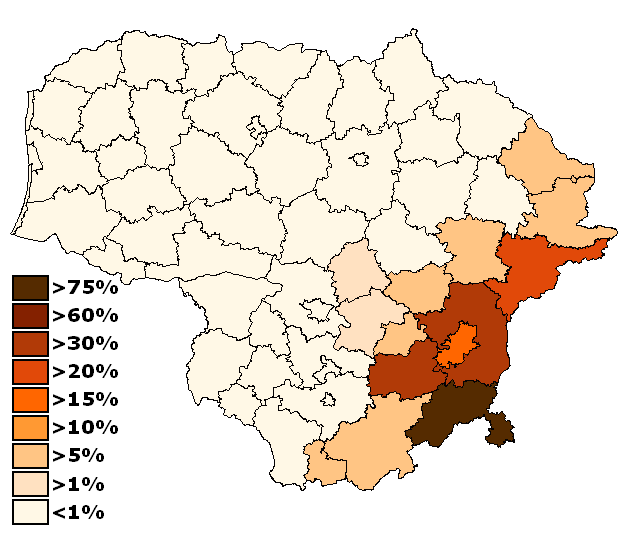
Poles in Lithuania (2011)

Area Nationality	Vilnius city municipality		Vilnius district municipality	
Belarusians	18 924	3.5%	3 982	4.2%
Lithuanians	338 758	63.2%	30 967	32.5%
Poles	88 408	16.5%	49 648	52.1%
Russians	63 991	11.9%	7 638	8.0%
Ukrainians	5 338	1.0%	623	0.7%
Jews	2 026	0.4%	109	0.1%
Other	4 754	0.9%	754	0.8%
Not indicated	13 432	2.5%	1 627	1.6%
Total	535 631	100%	95 348	100%

== 20th century ==
The city's population increased to 205,300 in 1909.

During World War I, thousands of residents were forced to flee, were killed, or were taken to labor camps; the city's 1919 population fell to 128,500. Vilnius recovered during the interwar period, with 209,442 residents in 1939, but its population fell to 110,000 in 1944.

The city's population increased as the capital of the Lithuanian Soviet Socialist Republic; according to the 1989 census, it had 576,747 residents. Although Lithuania experienced much emigration after independence in 1990, Vilnius' population was almost unchanged (542,287 in 2001) and has increased every year since 2006; its 1 January 2020 population was 580,020.

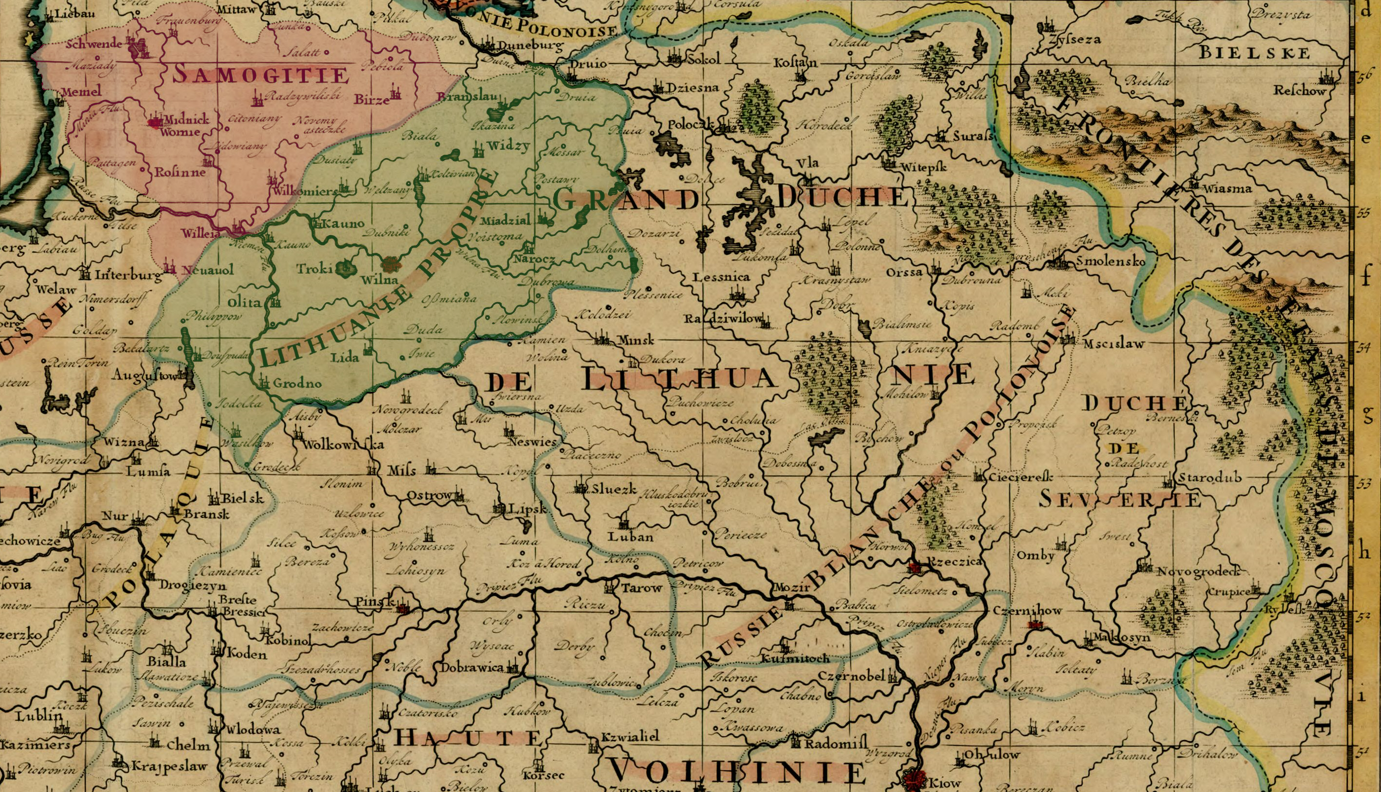
Vilnius (in green) in the Grand Duchy of Lithuania in a 1712 map

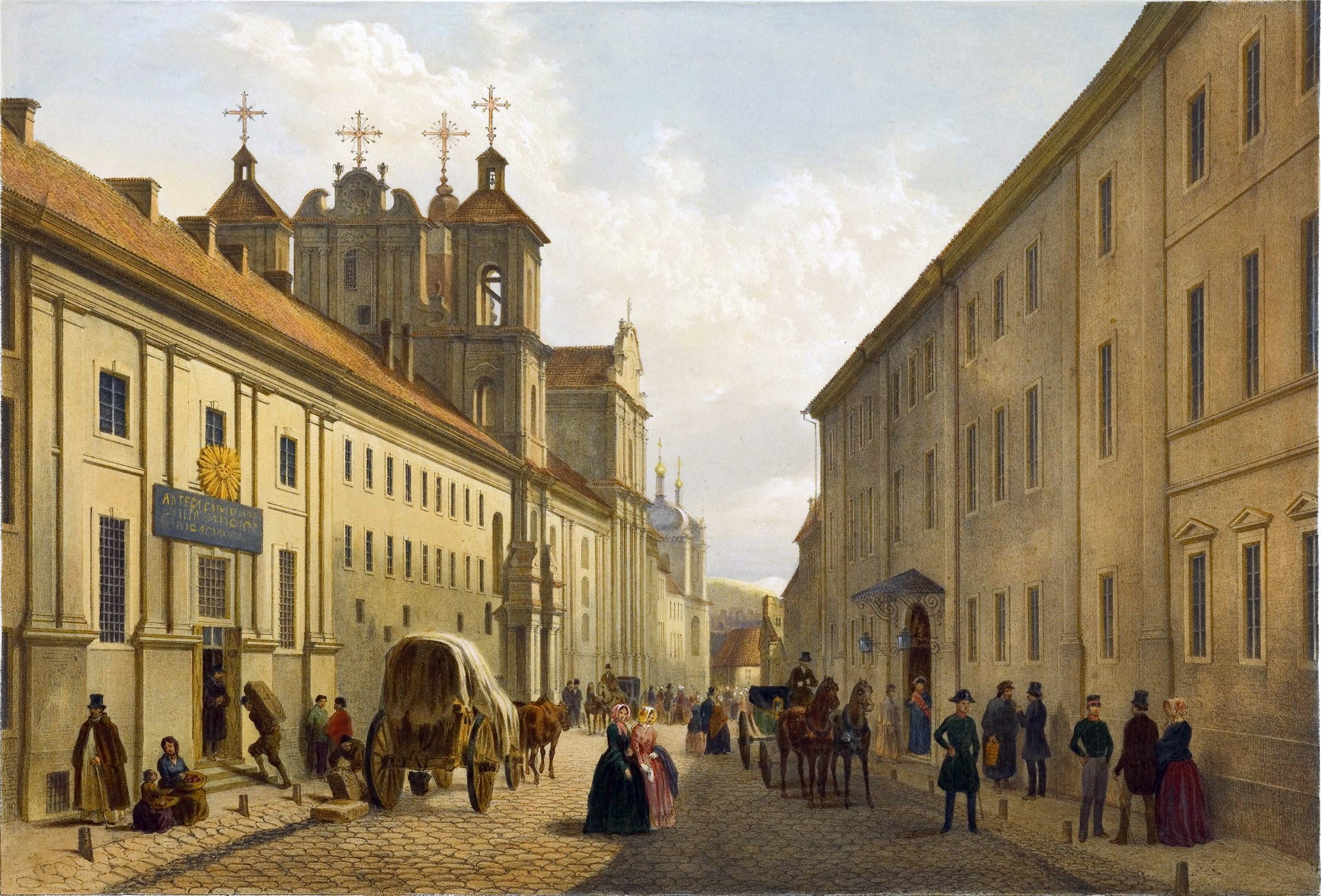
Near the Dominican Church of the Holy Spirit in Dominikonų Street, 19th century

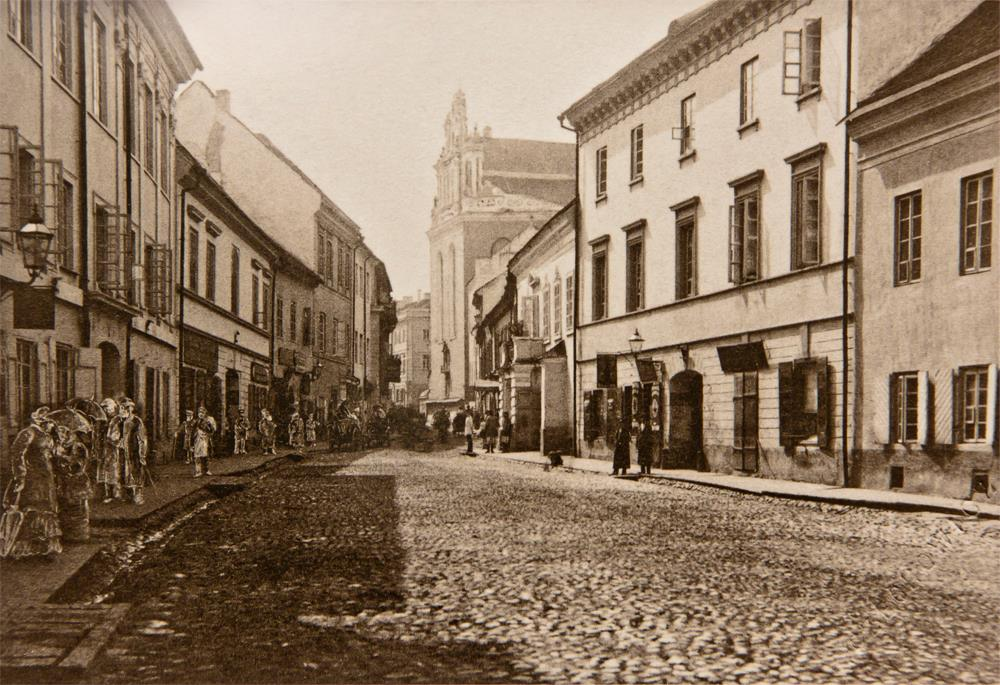
Pilies Street in 1873

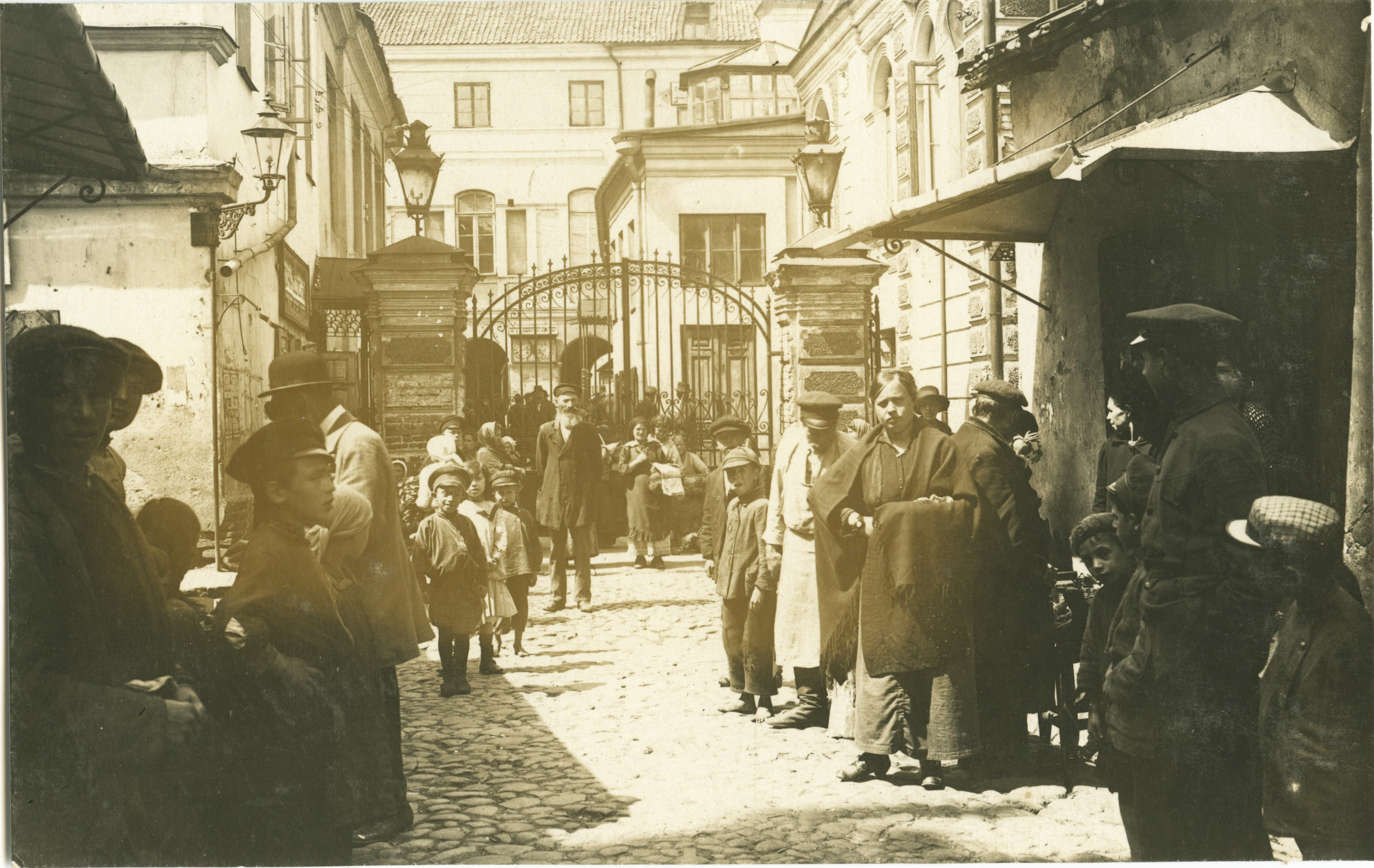
Vilnius in 1915–1916. The city was known for its ethnic tolerance until World War I.

The city's Lithuanian population reached a record low in 1931 (0.8 percent); Poles numbered 65.9 percent after the 1922 annexation of Vilnius Region by Poland and the Lithuanian retreat from the region to the temporary capital of Kaunas.

After the 1939 Soviet–Lithuanian Mutual Assistance Treaty, Lithuania regained one-third of Vilnius Region and tried to Lithuanize Vilnius by introducing Lithuanian laws. Prime Minister Antanas Merkys said that this was "to make everybody think like Lithuanians. First of all, it was and still is necessary to comb out the foreign element from the Vilnius Region". The Lithuanian government enacted a law in which those "who on 12 July 1920 (...) were regarded as Lithuanian nationals, and on 27 October 1939 were resident in the territory became Lithuanian nationals". About 150,000 Poles were repatriated from the Lithuanian SSR from 1945 to 1956. Nearly the entire Jewish population was exterminated during the Holocaust in Lithuania.

After World War II, the number of ethnic Lithuanians in Vilnius rebounded; however, Lithuanization was replaced with Sovietization. Following independence in 1990, Vilnius' ethnic-Lithuanian population increased to 63.2 percent in 2011 and 67.44 percent in 2021.

== Historic ethnic makeup ==
Historic ethnic makeup of Vilnius
Year	Lithuanians		Poles		Russians		Jews		Others		Total
1897	3,131	2%	47,795	31%	30,967	20%	61,847	40%	10,792	7%	154,532
1916	▲3,669	2.6%	▲70,629	50.1%	▼2,080	1.5%	▼61,265	43.5%	▼3,217	2.3%	▼140,840
1917	▼2,909	2.1%	▲74,466	53.65%	▲2,212	1.6%	▼57,516	41.44%	▼1,872	0.77%	▼138,787
1919	▼2,900	2.3%	▼72,067	56.1%	▲4,049	3.2%	▼46,506	36.2%	▲2,954	2.3%	▼128,476
1923	▼1,445	0.9%	▲100,830	60.2%	▲4,669	2.8%	▲56,168	33.5%	▲4,342	2.6%	▲167,454
1931	▲1,579	0.8%	▲128,628	65.9%	▲7,372	3.8%	▼54,596	28%	▼1,159	0.6%	▲195,071
1941	▲52,370	28.1%	▼94,511	50.7%	▼6.712	3.6%	▼30,179	16.2%	▲2,541	1.4%	▼186,313
1942	▼29,480	20.5%	▲103,203	71.9%	▼6,012	2%	—	—	▼1,220	0.4%	▼143,498
1951	▲55,300	30.8%	▼37,700	21%	▲59,700	33.3%	▼5,500	3.1%	▲21,100	11.8%	▲179,300
1959	▲79,363	33.6%	▲47,226	20%	▲69,416	29.4%	▲16,354	6.9%	▲23,719	10%	▲236,078
1970	▲159,156	42.8%	▲68,261	18.6%	▲91,004	24.5%	▲16,491	4.4%	▲37,188	10%	▲372,100
1979	▲225,137	47.3%	▲85,562	18%	▲105,618	22.2%	▼10,723	2.3%	▲48,785	10.3%	▲475,825
1989	▲291,527	50.5%	▲108,239	18.8%	▲116,618	20.2%	▼9,109	1.6%	▲51,524	8.9%	▲576,747
2001	▲318,510	57.5%	▼104,446	18.9%	▼77,698	14.1%	▼2,770	0.5%	▼50,480	9.1%	▼553,904
2011	▲337,000	63.2%	▼88,380	16.5%	▼64,275	12%	▼2,026	0.4%	▼45,976	8.6%	▼535,631
2021	▲373,511	67.1%	▼85,438	15.4%	▼53,886	9.7%	—	—	▼43,655	7.8%	▲556,490

=== Jews of Vilnius ===
The Jews living in Vilnius had their own complex identity, and labels of Polish Jews, Lithuanian Jews or Russian Jews are all applicable only in part. The majority of the Yiddish speaking population used the Litvish dialect.

Vilnius population pyramid in 2021

== The situation today ==
The Vilnius urban region is the only area in East Lithuania that doesn't face a decrease in population density. Polish people constitute the majority of native rural inhabitants in the Vilnius region. However, the share of Poles across the region is dwindling mainly due to the natural decline of rural population and process of suburbanization – most of new residents in the outskirts of Vilnius are Lithuanians.

Most Poles in the area today speak a dialect known as the simple speech (po prostu). Colloquial Polish in Lithuania includes dialectic qualities and is influenced by other languages. Educated Poles speak a language close to standard Polish.

== See also ==
- Demographics of Vilnius
- Ethnographic Lithuania
- Polish National-Territorial Region
- Polish minority in Lithuania

== Sources ==
=== Sources by language ===
==== English ====
- Balkelis, Tomas (2018). War, Revolution, and Nation-making in Lithuania, 1914-1923. Oxford University Press. ISBN 978-0-19-966802-1.
- Eidintas, Alfonsas; Bumblauskas, Alfredas; Kulakauskas, Antanas; Tamošaitis, Mindaugas (2013). The History of Lithuania (PDF). Vilnius: Eugrimas. ISBN 978-609-437-163-9. Archived from the original (PDF) on 7 August 2019.
- Geifman, Anna (1999). Russia Under the Last Tsar: Opposition and Subversion, 1894–1917. Blackwell Publishing. ISBN 1-55786-995-2.
- Lukowski, Jerzy; Zawadzki, Hubert (2006). A concise history of Poland. Cambridge University Press. ISBN 9780521853323.
- Miller, Alekseĭ I. (2008). "Identity and loyalty in the language policy of the Romanov Empire at her Western Borderland". The Romanov Empire and Nationalism: Essays in the Methodology of Historical Research. Central European University Press.
- Roshwald, Aviel (2001). Ethnic Nationalism and the Fall of Empires: Central Europe, Russia and the Middle East, 1914–1923. Routledge. ISBN 0-415-17893-2.
- Šapoka, Adolfas (1962). Vilnius in the Life of Lithuania. Toronto.
- Srebrakowski, Aleksander (2020). "The nationality panorama of Vilnius". Studia z Dziejów Rosji i Europy Środkowo-Wschodniej. LV (3).
- Strzelecki, Zbigniew, ed. (1991). Polish Population Review. Polish Demographic Society, Central Statistical Office. ISSN 0867-7905.

==== Lithuanian ====
- Budreckis, Algirdas (1967). "Etnografinės Lietuvos rytinės ir pietinės sienos". Karys.
- "Lietuvos Statistikos Metraštis". Lietuvos Statistikos Metrastis: Statistical Yearbook of Lithuania. Lietuvos Statistikos Departamentas prie Lietuvos Respublikos Vyriausybės. 1995. ISSN 1392-026X.
- Martinkėnas, Vincas (1990). Vilniaus ir jo apylinkių čiabuviai (in Lithuanian). Vilnius.
- Merkys, Vytautas (2004). "Vilniaus Vyskupija 1795–1864 m.: Nuo politinės link kultūrinės tautos" [Vilnius Diocese 1795–1864: From a political to a cultural nation] (PDF). Lietuvių Katalikų Mokslo Akademijos Metraštis (in Lithuanian). 24. Vilnius.
- Merkys, Vytautas (2006). Tautiniai santykiai Vilniaus vyskupijoje 1798–1918 m. [National relations in the Vilnius Diocese in 1798-1918] (in Lithuanian). Vilnius: Versus aureus. ISBN 9955-699-42-6.
- Zinkevičius, Zigmas (28 January 2014). "Lenkiškai kalbantys lietuviai" [Polish-speaking Lithuanians] (in Lithuanian).

==== Polish ====
===== 19th century =====
- Plater, Stanisław (1825). Jeografia wschodniéy części Europy czyli Opis krajów przez wielorakie narody słowiańskie zamieszkanych : obejmujący Prussy, Xsięztwo Poznańskie, Szląsk Pruski, Gallicyą, Rzeczpospolitę Krakowską, Krolestwo Polskie i Litwę [Geography of the Eastern Part of Europe, or Description of the Countries inhabited by Various Slavic Nations: Including Prussia, the Duchy of Posen, Prussian Silesia, Galicia, the Republic of Cracow, the Kingdom of Poland, and Lithuania] (in Polish). Wrocław: Wilhelm Bogumił Korn.
- Kleczyński, Józef (1892). Spisy ludności w Rzeczypospolitej Polskiej. Akademia Umiejętności, Kraków.
- Kleczyński, Józef (1898). Poszukiwania spisów ludności Rzeczypospolitej Polskiej w zbiorach Moskwy, Petersburga i Wilna. Kraków: Akademia Umiejętności.
- Rutowski, Tadeusz, ed. (1888). Rocznik Statystyki Przemysłu i Handlu Krajowego. Lwów: Krajowe Biuro Statystyczne.

===== 20th century =====
- Antoniewicz, Włodzimierz (1930). "Czasy przedhistoryczne i wczesnodziejowe Ziemi Wileńskiej". Wilno i Ziemia Wilenska (in Polish). Vol. I. Polska Drukarnia Nakładowa "LUX" Ludwika Chomińskiego. pp. 103–123.
- Brensztejn, Michał (1919). Spisy ludności m. Wilna za okupacji niemieckiej od d. 1 listopada 1915 r. (in Polish). Warsaw: Biblioteka Delegacji Rad Polskich Litwy i Białej Rusi.
- Buławski, Rajmund (1930). Pierwsze dziesięciolecie Głównego Urzędu Statystycznego. Vol. 3, Organizacja i technika opracowania pierwszego polskiego spisu powszechnego z 30 września 1921 roku. Warsaw: Główny Urząd Statystyczny.
- Skarbek, Jan, ed. (1996). Mniejszości w świetle spisów statystycznych XIX-XX w. Lublin: Instytut Europy Środkowo-Wschodniej. ISBN 83-85854-16-9.
- Srebrakowski, Aleksander (1997). Liczba Polaków na Litwie według spisu ludności z 27 maja 1942 roku (in Polish). Wrocław University, Wrocławskie Studia Wschodnie.
- Wielhorski, Władysław (1947). Polska a Litwa. Stosunki wzajemne w biegu dziejów [Poland and Lithuania. Mutual relations in the course of history] (in Polish). The Polish Research Centre.

===== 21st century =====
- Nenartovič, Tomaš (2016). Kaiserlich-russische, deutsche, polnische, litauische, belarussische und sowjetische kartographische Vorstellungen und territoriale Projekte zur Kontaktregion von Wilna 1795-1939 [Imperial Russian, German, Polish, Lithuanian, Belarusian, and Soviet Cartographic Concepts and Territorial Projects Concerning the Contact Region of Vilnius, 1795–1939] (PDF) (in German). München.
- Jurkiewicz, Joanna Januszewska (2010). Stosunki narodowościowe na Wileńszczyźnie w latach 1920—1939 (in Polish). Wydawnictwo Uniwersytetu Śląskiego.
- Pukszto, Andrzej (2006). Między stołecznością a partykularyzmen: wielonarodowościowe społeczeństwo Wilna w latach 1915-1920 [Between metropolitanism and particularism: the multinational society of Vilnius in 1915-1920] (in Polish). Europejskie Centrum Edukacyjne. ISBN 9788388089589.
- Srebrakowski, Aleksander (2000). Polacy w Litewskiej SRR 1944-1989. Toruń.
- Strzelecki, Zbigniew; Toczyński, Tadeusz; Latuch, Kazimierz, eds. (2002). Spisy ludności Rzeczypospolitej Polskiej 1921–2002; wybór pism demografów. Warsaw: Polskie Towarzystwo Demograficzne, Główny Urząd Statystyczny. ISBN 83-901912-9-6.
- Внуковіч, Ю. (2023). Маркеры этнічнай ідэнтычнасці жыхароў Віленшчыны (па матэрыялах палявых этнаграфічных экспедыцый пачатку ХХІ ст.) [Markers of the Ethnic Identity of the Inhabitants of Vilnius Region (on the Material of Ethnographic Field Expeditions of the Beginning of the 21st Century)]. Studia Białorutenistyczne (in Belarusian). 17: 65–87. doi:10.17951/sb.2023.17.65-87.

==== Russian ====
- Anisimov, Vladimir Ilyich (1912). "Виленская губерния" [Vilna province]. Энциклопедический словарь Русского библиографического института Гранат (in Russian). Vol. 10: Вех — Воздух. Moscow: Изд. тов. А. Гранат и К°.
- Dolbilov, Mikhail (2010). Русский край, чужая вера: Этноконфессиональная политика империи в Литве и Белоруссии при Александре II [Russian Territory, Foreign Faith: Ethno-Confessional Policy of the Empire in Lithuania and Belarus under Alexander II] (in Russian). Moscow: Новое литературное обозрение. ISBN 978-5-86793-804-8.
