= Demographics of Vilnius =

- Population pyramid of the Vilnius City in 2021
- Population: 638,144 (2025)

Vilnius is the historic and present-day capital of Lithuania. Records of demographic measures go back to 1766, though the city itself has existed much longer. In recent days, the demographics have been heavily influenced by the war in neighboring Ukraine.

== Current Demographics ==
After the Russian invasion of Ukraine and an influx of Ukrainian refugees to Lithuania, who were granted a refugee status the number of inhabitants of Vilnius rose to 643,513 as of April 2026 (according to the municipality of Vilnius). The number of inhabitants of Vilnius, born in Ukraine rose from 10 thousand to 29 thousand between 2021 and 2023. The number of persons born in Belarus rose from 25 thousand to 37 thousand during the same period mostly as a consequence of 2020–2021 Belarusian protests and intensified fleeing abroad of its citizens. Also, numbers of persons, who settle in Vilnius, coming from Central Asia, Caucasus, African, Asian (most notably - India) countries are on the rise.

In 2023-2024 a surge of migrants from Central Asia and India was observed. The number of economic migrants in Lithuania from Uzbekistan rose from 1.8 thousand to almost 10 thousand, from Kyrgyzstan – from less than 2 thousand to more than 6.6 thousand, from Tajikistan – from 1.4 thousand to 6.3 thousand, from India – from 1.2 thousand to 5.2 thousand. Most of these migrants settled in Vilnius.

As of late 2023, 73 thousand foreigners lived in Vilnius, up from 38 thousand a year and a half earlier. In January 2022, there were also 5 000 foreign minors living in Vilnius, but the number had risen to 13 000 in January 2023.

Before these dramatic changes, what led to the sharp rise of the number of inhabitants, the city of Vilnius as of early 2021 had a population between 569,729 (according to Statistics Lithuania) and 588,412 (according to the State Enterprise Centre of Registers). According to the municipality of Vilnius, the city had a population of 597,610 as of May 2022 – the figure includes Grigiškės, a formally separate town within the municipality of the capital, but without a separate body of a town government except that of a Vilnius city district (seniūnija). The actual number of city inhabitants could be higher as according to the Vilnius territorial health insurance fund, there were 732,815 permanent inhabitants as of January 2021 in Vilnius city and Vilnius district municipalities combined (Note: Some inhabitants of Vilnius district were registered at Vilnius city healthcare facilities – the actual number of permanent city inhabitants within the city administrative borders must have been higher than official figures of 569, 588 or 589 thousand, but smaller than 643,965 (as of 31 December 2020)).

According to the predictions, made by the municipality specialists of the city planning department of Vilnius, the number of inhabitants of Vilnius in 2030 could be between 630,3 thousand (pessimistic scenario) and 685 thousand (optimistic scenario) with the basic scenario of 651,6 thousand inhabitants within the city borders.

== Evolution ==
Demographic evolution of Vilnius between 1766 and 2026:

Historical population

Year	Pop.	±% p.a.
1766	60,000	—
1796¹	17,500	−4.02%
1800	25,400	+9.76%
1811	56,300	+7.50%
1818²	33,600	−7.11%
1822	43,900	+6.91%
1830	42,000	−0.55%
1834	52,400	+5.69%
1836	56,100	+3.47%
1839	54,700	−0.84%
1846	54,200	−0.13%
1852	65,400	+3.18%
1860	60,000	−1.07%
1870	64,200	+0.68%
1875	82,700	+5.19%
1885	102,900	+2.21%
1897	154,532	+3.45%
1909	205,200	+2.39%
1911	238,600	+7.83%
1916	140,800	−10.01%
1919³	128,500	−3.00%
1923	167,400	+6.83%

Year	Pop.	±% p.a.
1931	195,100	+1.93%
1939	209,400	+0.89%
1941⁴	270,000	+13.55%
1944⁵	110,000	−25.87%
1959	236,100	+5.22%
1970	372,100	+4.22%
1979	481,000	+2.89%
1985	544,400	+2.09%
1989	576,700	+1.45%
1990	597,000	+3.52%
1992	644,600	+3.91%
1995	578,327	−3.55%
1996	571,164	−1.24%
1997	565,881	−0.92%
1998	562,353	−0.62%
1999	558,816	−0.63%
2000	554,281	−0.81%
2001	550,924	−0.61%
2002	550,213	−0.13%
2003	548,729	−0.27%
2004	546,773	−0.36%
2005	542,525	−0.78%

Year	Pop.	±% p.a.
2006	541,732	−0.15%
2007	541,596	−0.03%
2008	542,969	+0.25%
2009	543,191	+0.04%
2010	536,127	−1.30%
2011	533,279	−0.53%
2012	537,152	+0.73%
2013	539,707	+0.48%
2014	542,626	+0.54%
2015	543,493	+0.16%
2016	545,280	+0.33%
2017	547,484	+0.40%
2018	552,131	+0.85%
2019	561,836	+1.76%
2020	569,729	+1.40%
2021	563,012	−1.18%
2022	576,195	+2.34%
2023	593,250	+2.96%
2024	605,270	+2.03%
2025	607,404	+0.35%
2026	617,984	+1.74%

Source: ¹ Sharp decline after the Vilnius uprising (1794); ² Decline of population due to Napoleonic wars and the aftermath; ³ Sharp decline of population of Vilnius because of World War I and the aftermath during the clashes around Vilnius. These resulted in evacuation of Russian military, bureaucracy and the majority of its Russian inhabitants from Vilnius in 1915, as well as fleeing or evacuation of other Vilnius inhabitants of various communities (mostly Jewish and Lithuanian) to Russia and rural parts of Lithuania; ⁴ Rise of population due to influx of Polish and Jewish war refugees and migration of Lithuanian bureaucracy, students from temporary capital Kaunas and other localities in Lithuania; ⁵ Sharp decline of population after atrocities of World War II and The Holocaust

== Vilnius inhabitants by ethnicity ==
Year	Lithuanians		Poles		Russians		Jews		Others		Total
1897*	3,131	2%	47,795	31%	30,967	20%	61,847	40%	10,792	7%	154,532
1916*	▲3,669	2.6%	▲70,629	50.1%	▼2,080	1.5%	▼61,265	43.5%	▼3,217	2.3%	▼140,840
1917*	▼2,909	2.1%	▲74,466	53.65%	▲2,212	1.6%	▼57,516	41.44%	▼1,872	0.77%	▼138,787
1919*	▼2,900	2.3%	▼72,067	56.1%	▲4,049	3.2%	▼46,506	36.2%	▲2,954	2.3%	▼128,476
1923*	▼1,445	0.9%	▲100,830	60.2%	▲4,669	2.8%	▲56,168	33.5%	▲4,342	2.6%	▲167,454
1931*	▲1,579	0.8%	▲128,628	65.9%	▲7,372	3.8%	▼54,596	28%	▼1,159	0.6%	▲195,071
1941	▲52,370	28.1%	▼94,511	50.7%	▼6.712	3.6%	▼30,179	16.2%	▲2,541	1.4%	▼186,313
1942	▼29,480	20.5%	▲103,203	71.9%	▼6,012	2%	N/A		▼1,220	0.4%	▼143,498
1951	▲55,300	30.8%	▼37,700	21%	▲59,700	33.3%	▼5,500	3.1%	▲21,100	11.8%	▲179,300
1959	▲79,363	33.6%	▲47,226	20%	▲69,416	29.4%	▲16,354	6.9%	▲23,719	10%	▲236,078
1970	▲159,156	42.8%	▲68,261	18.6%	▲91,004	24.5%	▲16,491	4.4%	▲37,188	10%	▲372,100
1979	▲225,137	47.3%	▲85,562	18%	▲105,618	22.2%	▼10,723	2.3%	▲48,785	10.3%	▲475,825
1989	▲291,527	50.5%	▲108,239	18.8%	▲116,618	20.2%	▼9,109	1.6%	▲51,524	8.9%	▲576,747
2001	▲318,510	57.5%	▼104,446	18.9%	▼77,698	14.1%	▼2,770	0.5%	▼50,480	9.1%	▼553,904
2011	▲337,000	63.2%	▼88,380	16.5%	▼64,275	12%	▼2,026	0.4%	▼45,976	8.6%	▼535,631
2021	▲373,511	67.1%	▼85,438	15.4%	▼53,886	9.7%	N/A		▼43,655	7.8%	▲556,490

*By language spoken

Vilnius inhabitants by ethnicity(results of the 2011 census)
	Number of inhabitants
Lithuanians	338,758
Poles	88,408
Russians	63,991
Belarusians	18,924
Ukrainians	5,338
Jews	2,026
Tatars	934
Roma	619
Armenians	435
Latvians	360
Germans	341
Other	2,065
Refused to answer	13,432
Total	535,631

Vilnius inhabitants by ethnicity(results of the 2021 census)
	Number of inhabitants
Lithuanians	373,513
Poles	85,436
Russians	53,887
Belarusians	15,156
Ukrainians	4,687
Other	5,705
Refused to answer	18,112
Total	556,490

== Vilnius inhabitants by the country of birth ==
Vilnius inhabitants by the country of birth (as of February 2025)
Country of birth	Number of inhabitants
(European Union) Lithuania	526,409
Belarus	38,797
Russia	19,833
Ukraine	19,827
Great Britain	2,479
Kazakhstan	2,158
Uzbekistan	2,080
Azerbaijan	1,857
Tajikistan	1,840
India	1,719
Turkey	1,485
(European Union) Latvia	1,435
(European Union) Germany	1,097
Kyrgyzstan	1,072
Georgia	989
(European Union) Poland	784
United States of America	778
Pakistan	768
Moldova	564
(European Union) Ireland	490
(European Union) Italy	455
Norway	432
(European Union) France	400
(European Union) Estonia	399
Nigeria	374
Armenia	354
Bangladesh	329
China	290
(European Union) Spain	288
Cameroon	249
Morocco	244
(European Union) Denmark	225
(European Union) Belgium	223
Egypt	217
(European Union) Netherlands	206
Iran	203
Turkmenistan	167
Afghanistan	164
(European Union) Sweden	156
Syria	151
Israel	116
Algeria	107
Philippines	100
Canada	96
(European Union) Portugal	94
Lebanon	94
(European Union) Hungary	93
Brazil	92
Switzerland	90
(European Union) Finland	88
Thailand	84
Argentina	81
Vietnam	80
United Arab Emirates	77
(European Union) Austria	77
(European Union) Greece	77
Sri Lanka	77
Nepal	76
Mexico	74
(European Union) Czech Republic	64
Ghana	64
Australia	61
Japan	61
(European Union) Romania	57
(European Union) Bulgaria	56
Colombia	55
Kenya	50
Venezuela	46
South Korea	45
Iceland	44
South Africa	44
(European Union) Cyprus	41
Iraq	39
Serbia	37
Saudi Arabia	38
(European Union) Slovakia	37
Tunisia	36
(European Union) Luxembourg	28
Indonesia	28
Albania	26
Cuba	26
Zimbabwe	25
Mongolia	24
(European Union) Malta	23
Peru	22
(European Union) Croatia	20
Democratic Republic of the Congo	19
Jordan	19
North Macedonia	18
Ecuador	17
New Zealand	17
Chile	15
Singapore	13
Taiwan	13
Other countries	268

Vilnius inhabitants by the country of birth (as of March 2023)
Country of birth	Number of inhabitants
(European Union) Lithuania	522,481
Belarus	37,197
Ukraine	29,336
Russia	20,834
Great Britain	2,330
Kazakhstan	1,938
(European Union) Latvia	1,393
(European Union) Germany	1,089
Uzbekistan	941
Azerbaijan	931
Kyrgyzstan	766
(European Union) Poland	757
Georgia	688
United States of America	683
India	624
Tajikistan	540
Turkey	519
Moldova	510
(European Union) Ireland	469
(European Union) Italy	388
Norway	387
Armenia	380
(European Union) Estonia	379
(European Union) France	367
(European Union) Spain	253
China	245
Nigeria	216
(European Union) Belgium	209
(European Union) Denmark	207
Turkmenistan	179
(European Union) Netherlands	179
Syria	177
Afghanistan	170
Cameroon	151
(European Union) Sweden	147
Pakistan	144
Iran	139
Egypt	125
Israel	103
(European Union) Finland	96
(European Union) Hungary	88
Canada	81
(European Union) Portugal	81
Brazil	79
Lebanon	78
Switzerland	77
(European Union) Czech Republic	74
(European Union) Austria	70
Thailand	69
Vietnam	64
United Arab Emirates	59
Argentina	57
(European Union) Greece	56
Mexico	56
Australia	54
(European Union) Romania	49
(European Union) Bulgaria	47
(European Union) Cyprus	45
Japan	44
South Korea	37
Serbia	36
Colombia	35
Iceland	35
Morocco	35
South Africa	35
(European Union) Slovakia	34
Venezuela	32
Iraq	30
Nepal	30
(European Union) Luxembourg	28
Indonesia	27
Tunisia	25
Saudi Arabia	24
Bangladesh	22
Ghana	22
Mongolia	22
Albania	20
Algeria	20
Eritrea	20
Other countries	421

Vilnius inhabitants by the country of birth (2021)
Country of birth	Number of inhabitants
(European Union) Lithuania	517,936
Belarus	25,591
Russia	18,731
Ukraine	10,158
Great Britain	2,239
Kazakhstan	1,598
(European Union) Latvia	1,335
(European Union) Germany	954
(European Union) Poland	752
United States of America	618
Uzbekistan	578
Azerbaijan	496
Georgia	474
(European Union) Ireland	470
India	408
Moldova	384
(European Union) Italy	378
(European Union) Estonia	373
Norway	364
(European Union) France	341
Turkey	329
Armenia	316
Kyrgyzstan	297
China	283
(European Union) Spain	254
Tajikistan	209
(European Union) Belgium	189
(European Union) Denmark	187
Turkmenistan	153
(European Union) Netherlands	149
(European Union) Sweden	140
Nigeria	122
Iran	120
Cameroon	114
Syria	109
Serbia	98
(European Union) Finland	97
Egypt	91
Israel	87
Pakistan	79
Vietnam	79
(European Union) Hungary	77
(European Union) Portugal	73
(European Union) Austria	70
Canada	70
Switzerland	67
(European Union) Czech Republic	67
Brazil	64
Afghanistan	51
Lebanon	51
Australia	50
Thailand	49
(European Union) Greece	46
Mexico	45
Argentina	44
(European Union) Bulgaria	44
United Arab Emirates	41
Japan	40
South Korea	36
(European Union) Cyprus	31
(European Union) Luxembourg	28
Iceland	27
(European Union) Slovakia	27
Colombia	26
(European Union) Romania	26
Nepal	24
Albania	23
Iraq	23
Morocco	22
Other countries	500

== Elderships of Vilnius ==
Population figures of Vilnius by the city eldership (2021)
Eldership	Area km²	Inhabitants	Density per km²
Verkiai	56	50,881	909
Žirmūnai	5.7	43,880	7698
Pašilaičiai	7.9	41,218	5217
Antakalnis	77.2	40,875	530
Naujoji Vilnia	38.6	39,102	1013
Fabijoniškės	5.9	38,027	9275
Naujamiestis	4.9	33,206	6777
Lazdynai	9.9	32,410	3274
Naujininkai	37.6	31,697	843
Šeškinė	4.6	29,809	6480
Pilaitė	13.9	28,335	2038
Justiniškės	3.0	26,684	8895
Karoliniškės	3.7	25,250	6824
Senamiestis	4.4	22,411	5093
Vilkpėdė	10.8	19,519	1807
Šnipiškės	3.1	15,750	5081
Viršuliškės	2.6	14,096	5422
Žvėrynas	2.6	13,703	5270
Rasos	16.3	11,666	716
Grigiškės	7.0	11,246	1607
Paneriai	84.8	10,537	124
Undeclared inhabitants		9,123	
Total	400.5	589,425	1472

== See also ==
- Demographic history of the Vilnius region
