= Natio Hungarica =

Natio Hungarica ('Hungarian nation') is a Latin phrase used as a medieval and early modern era geographic, institutional and juridico-political category in Kingdom of Hungary without any ethnic connotation. The medieval Natio Hungarica consisted only the members of the Hungarian Parliament, which was composed of the nobility, Roman Catholic clergy, and a limited number of enfranchised burghers (regardless of their real ethnicity and mother tongue). The same term was extended later to denominate the whole elite with the corporate political rights of parliamentary representation in the early modern period — the Roman Catholic prelates, all magnates, and all nobles. The other important—and more numerous—component of Natio Hungarica was the noble members of the county assemblies in the county seats, Kingdom of Hungary had 72 counties. The noble assemblies of the counties elected most of the envoys (members) of the parliament. Those who had no direct participation in the political life on national (parliamentary) or local (counties) level (like the common people of the cities, towns, or the peasantry of the villages) were not considered part of the Natio Hungarica. This medieval convention was also adopted officially in the Treaty of Szatmár of 1711 and the Pragmatic Sanction of 1723; remained until 1848, when the privileges of the Hungarian nobility were abolished; and thereafter acquired a sense of ethnic nationalism.

In the modern era, Natio Hungarica is a concept in Hungarian nationalism.

== See also ==
- Name of Hungary
