= Mirosław Jankowiak =

Polish linguist and Belarusianist

- Mirosław Jankowiak
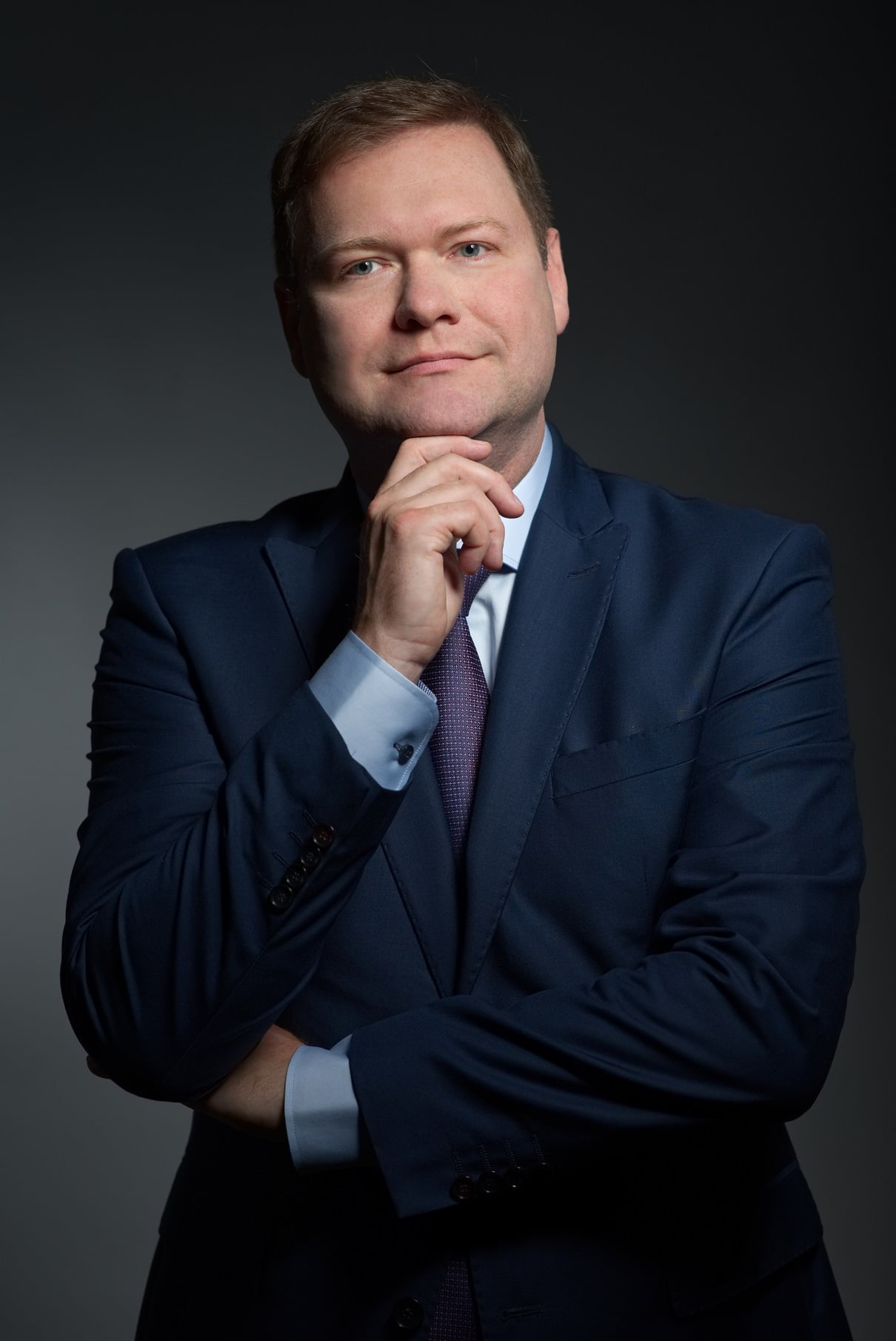
- Born: 28 June 1979 (age 46); Warsaw, Poland
- Citizenship: Polish
- Education: Habilitated Doctor (dr hab.)
- Alma mater: University of Warsaw
- Occupations: Linguist, Slavicist, Belarusianist
- Employer(s): Czech Academy of Sciences; University of Warsaw
- Known for: Research on Belarusian dialects, sociolinguistics of the Baltic-Slavic borderland
- Awards: Medal of the 90th Anniversary of the National Academy of Sciences of Belarus (2019)
- Website: www.slu.cas.cz/en/zamestnanec/miroslaw-jankowiak

Mirosław Jankowiak (Polish: Mirosław Jankowiak; born 28 June 1979) is a Polish linguist, Polonist, and Belarusianist. He holds the degree of Habilitated Doctor (dr hab.).

== Biography ==
Mirosław Jankowiak was born on 28 June 1979 in Warsaw.

From 1998 to 2003, he studied at the Department of Belarusian Philology of the Faculty of Applied Linguistics and East Slavic Philologies at the University of Warsaw, where he defended his master's thesis in linguistics titled Polonisms in the Religious Work of the Late 18th Century 'Nauki parafialne' (Polish: Polonizmy w utworze religijnym z końca XVIII w. 'Nauki parafialne' ). Simultaneously, he studied Polish philology at the Faculty of Polish Studies at the University of Warsaw, defending his licentiate thesis Singularia and Pluralia Tantum in Polish and Belarusian (Polish: Singularia i pluralia tantum w języku polskim i białoruskim) in 2003. In 2002–2004, he studied at the Centre for East European Studies at the University of Warsaw.

From 2003 to 2008, he was a doctoral student at the Institute of Slavic Studies of the Polish Academy of Sciences. In January 2008, he received a Ph.D. in linguistics based on his dissertation Belarusian Dialects in Latvia in the Krāslava District: A Sociolinguistic Study (Polish: Gwary białoruskie na Łotwie w rejonie krasławskim. Studium socjolingwistyczne). In March 2023, he obtained the degree of Habilitated Doctor (dr hab.) at the Nicolaus Copernicus University in Toruń based on his monograph Lexicon of Belarusian Dialects in Lithuania: Linguistic Heritage of the Baltic-Slavic Borderland (Polish: Leksyka gwar białoruskich na Litwie. Dziedzictwo językowe pogranicza bałto-słowiańskiego).

From 2008 to 2017, he worked as an adjunct professor at the Institute of Slavic Studies of the Polish Academy of Sciences, where he was a member of the Laboratory for Research on Northern Borderland Polish under the supervision of Professor Iryda Grek-Pabisowa. In 2017, he worked at the Historical Museum in Legionowo.

In 2018–2022, he was a fellow of the J. E. Purkyně Fellowship at the Institute of Slavonic Studies of the Czech Academy of Sciences in Prague, where he implemented the project Belarusian Dialects in Latvia as an Example of the Lexical Heritage of the Baltic-Slavic Borderland. Since January 2023, he has been a researcher at this institution.

He has collaborated with the Department of Belarusian Studies at the University of Warsaw, the Institute of the Lithuanian Language (Vilnius), the Institute of the Latvian Language (Riga), the Yakub Kolas Institute of Linguistics of the National Academy of Sciences of Belarus, and the Institute of Slavic Studies at the University of Mainz. Since 2024, he has been teaching the Belarusian language at the University of Warsaw.

== Scientific activity ==
Jankowiak is the author of 6 monographs and over 100 scientific articles. His main research interests include the Belarusian language (especially dialectology outside modern Belarus), linguistic borderlands (especially Balto-Slavic), sociolinguistics, the language and culture of Belarusians in the Baltic states (Latvia, Lithuania) and the Kaliningrad Oblast, as well as the Polish language in the territories of present-day Belarus, Lithuania, and Latvia (the so-called Northern Borderland dialect).

He is a member of the Commission on Language Contacts of the International Committee of Slavists, the International Association of Belarusianists, the Polish Association for Belarusian Studies, and the Łomża Scientific Society. He is a co-founder of the Belarusian Institute in Prague. Since 2016, he has collaborated with the journal Przegląd Bałtycki ("Baltic Review") and is a member of its editorial board. Mirosław Jankowiak is also associated with the publications and scientific initiatives of the Department of Belarusian Studies at the University of Warsaw, including the yearbook Acta Albaruthenica.

He is also involved in regional history; since 2008, he has been a member of the Society of Friends of Legionowo and the editorial board of the publication Rocznik Legionowski, researching the history of the city of Legionowo and Legionowo County.

In 2025, he participated in public discussions on Polskie Radio regarding the state of Polish dialects and language contacts in the territories of the former Polish–Lithuanian Commonwealth (Lithuania, Latvia, Belarus), as well as sociolinguistic factors of preservation/disappearance of regional language variants.

== Awards ==
- 2019 – Jubilee Medal for the 90th Anniversary of the National Academy of Sciences of Belarus (for research on Belarusian dialects in Latvia).
- 2013 – Jubilee Medal for the 80th Anniversary of the National Academy of Sciences of Belarus (for popularizing the history and dialectology of the Belarusian language).
- 2023 – Laureate of the Meletius Smotrytsky Competition for the best scientific monograph in the field of Belarusian and Ukrainian culture (under the patronage of the Rector of the University of Warsaw) for the book Lexicon of Belarusian Dialects in Lithuania.

== Bibliography ==
=== Monographs ===
- Barszczewska, N.; Jankowiak, M. (2012). Dialektologia białoruska [Belarusian Dialectology] (in Polish). Warszawa: Slawistyczny Ośrodek Wydawniczy. p. 308.
- Jankowiak, M. (2015). Беларускія гаворкі ў Краслаўскім раёне Латвіі. Сацыялінгвістычнае дасьледаваньне [Belarusian Dialects in the Krāslava District of Latvia: A Sociolinguistic Study] (in Belarusian) (2nd ed.). Białystok—Vilnius: Smolensk. p. 288. (Translation from Polish)
- Jankowiak, M. (2009). Gwary białoruskie na Łotwie w rejonie krasławskim. Studium socjolingwistyczne [Belarusian Dialects in Latvia in the Krāslava District: A Sociolinguistic Study] (in Polish). Warszawa: Slawistyczny Ośrodek Wydawniczy. p. 248.
- Jankowiak, M. (2018). Současná běloruská nářečí v Lotyšsku. Charakteristika. Výběr textů / Współczesne gwary białoruskie na Łotwie. Charakterystyka. Wybór tekstów [Contemporary Belarusian Dialects in Latvia: Characteristics, Selection of Texts] (in Czech and Polish). Praha: Slovanský ústav AV ČR. p. 468.
- Jankowiak, M. (2022). Lexikum běloruských nářečí v Litvě. Jazykové dědictví balto-slovanského pomezí [Lexicon of Belarusian Dialects in Lithuania: Linguistic Heritage of the Baltic-Slavic Borderland] (in Czech). Praha: Slovanský ústav AV ČR. p. 624.
- Jankowiak, M.; Kascian, K., eds. (2022). In the Shadow of Others. Belarusian-Latvian Relations from the Past to Nowadays. Praha: Slovanský ústav AV ČR.
- Grek-Pabis, I.; Jankowiak, M.; Ostrówka, M., eds. (2017). Słownik Mówionej Polszczyzny Północnokresowej [Dictionary of Spoken Northern Borderland Polish] (in Polish). Warszawa: Instytut Slawistyki PAN. p. 1444.
- Kurcova, V.; Snihiróva, N.; Jankowiak, M.; Ostrówka, M., eds. (2016). Беларуска-польскія культурна-моўныя ўзаемадачыненні: ад гісторыі да сучаснасці [Belarusian-Polish Cultural and Linguistic Relations: From History to Modernity] (in Belarusian). Minsk—Warsaw.
- Jankowiak, M. (2023). Współczesne gwary białoruskie na Litwie. Tom pierwszy. Rejon orański / Šiuolaikinės baltarusių šnektos Lietuvoje. Pirmasis tomas. Varėnos rajonas [Contemporary Belarusian Dialects in Lithuania. Volume One. Varėna District] (in Polish and Lithuanian). Vilnius: Lietuvių kalbos institutas. p. 258.

=== Selected articles ===
- Jankowiak, M. (2013). "Belarusian dialects in Latvian Latgale — transitional or mixed". Contemporary approaches to dialectology: The area of North, Northwest Russian and Belarusian vernaculars (Slavica Bergensia 13). Bergen.
- Jankowiak, M. (2013). "Gwary białoruskie na zachodniej Smoleńszczyźnie — dzieje agonii" [Belarusian Dialects in Western Smolensk Region — History of Agony]. Slavia (in Polish) (3 (82)). Praha: 315–322.
- Jankowiak, M. (2013). "Białorusini" [Belarusians]. In M. Marcjanik (ed.). Jak zwracają się do siebie Europejczycy (in Polish). Warszawa. pp. 59–69.
- Jankowiak, M. (2012). Беларуская мова ў Латвіі: статус, сферы выкарыстання, перспектывы [Belarusian Language in Latvia: Status, Spheres of Use, Perspectives]. Беларусіка-Albaruthenica 32. Матэрыялы V Міжнароднага кангрэса беларусістаў (in Belarusian). Minsk: 353–364.
- Jankowiak, M. (2012). "Belorussian Minority in the Krāslava Area in Latvia. Language in the Domain of Religion". Linguistica Lettica (20). Rīga: 18–38.
- Jankowiak, M.; Grajewski, Ł. (2011). "Szlakiem białoruskich Poleszuków (raport z badań terenowych)" [On the Trail of Belarusian Poleshuks (Field Research Report)]. Acta Baltico-Slavica (in Polish) (35). Warszawa: 215–236.
- Jankowiak, M. (2010). Лексіка беларускамоўных жыхароў Латгаліі (на прыкладзе Краслаўскага раёна) [Lexicon of Belarusian-speaking Residents of Latgale (Case Study of Krāslava District)]. Polsko-białoruskie związki kulturowe, literackie i językowe (in Belarusian). Lublin. pp. 397–406.
- Jankowiak, M. (2010). Wielonarodowość i wielokulturowość Łatgalii w aspekcie społecznym i historycznym [Multinationality and Multiculturalism of Latgale in Social and Historical Aspect] (in Polish). Bydgoszcz. pp. 46–53.
- Jankowiak, M. (2010). Прафесар Яўхім Карскі — рэктар Імператарскага Варшаўскага ўніверсітэта [Professor Yefim Karsky — Rector of the Imperial University of Warsaw]. Arche (in Belarusian) (4): 298–308.
- Jankowiak, M. (2010). Беларуская мова ў Латвіі: статус, сферы выкарыстання, перспектывы [Belarusian Language in Latvia: Status, Spheres of Use, Perspectives]. Acta Albaruthenica (in Belarusian) (10). Warszawa: 301–310.
- Jankowiak, M. (2009). Образ национальностей проживающих на белорусско-латвийском пограничье в глазах жителей Латгалии [The Image of Nationalities Living on the Belarusian-Latvian Borderland in the Eyes of Latgale Residents]. Балто-славянские культурные связи (in Russian). Riga. pp. 569–580.
- Jankowiak, M. (2008). "Białorusini Łatgalii — autochtoni czy imigranci?" [Belarusians of Latgale — Autochthons or Immigrants?]. Acta Albaruthenica (in Polish) (8). Warszawa: 264–274.
- Jankowiak, M. (2008). "Kilka uwag o czynnikach kształtujących tożsamość narodową mniejszości białoruskiej na Łotwie (na przykładzie rejonu krasławskiego)" [A Few Remarks on Factors Shaping the National Identity of the Belarusian Minority in Latvia (Case Study of Krāslava District)]. Rodzina — Tożsamość — Język. Z badań na pograniczu słowiańsko-bałtyckim (in Polish). Warszawa. pp. 69–93.
- Jankowiak, M. (2007). Zakres funkcjonowania języka białoruskiego i stan zachowania gwary na przykładzie wybranych miejscowości w okolicach Horek w obwodzie mohylewskim [The Scope of Functioning of the Belarusian Language and the State of Dialect Preservation on the Example of Selected Localities near Horki in the Mogilev Region] (in Polish). Warszawa. pp. 293–315.
- Jankowiak, M.; Ostrówka, M. (2007). "Język polski na Białorusi Wschodniej. Sytuacja socjolingwistyczna i uwagi o mowie wsi Stajsk i Wesełowo" [Polish Language in Eastern Belarus. Sociolinguistic Situation and Remarks on the Speech of Stajsk and Wesełowo Villages]. Acta Baltico-Slavica (in Polish) (31). Warszawa: 175–198.
- Jankowiak, M. (2007). "Apdzīvojošu Krāslavas rajonu baltkrievu minoritāšu daudzvalodība. Valodu funkcionēšanas sfēras" [Multilingualism of the Belarusian Minority Living in the Krāslava District. Spheres of Language Functioning]. Linguistica Lettica (in Latvian) (16). Rīga: 193–211.
- Jankowiak, M. (2006). "Białorusini na Łotwie — współczesna sytuacja socjolingwistyczna na przykładzie rejonu krasławskiego" [Belarusians in Latvia — Contemporary Sociolinguistic Situation on the Example of the Krāslava District]. Acta Baltico-Slavica (in Polish) (30). Warszawa: 542–556.
- Jankowiak, M. (2006). Социолингвистическая ситуация белорусов на белорусско-российском пограничье [Sociolinguistic Situation of Belarusians on the Belarusian-Russian Borderland]. Linguistica Lettica (in Russian) (15). Rīga: 193–210.
- Jankowiak, M. (2006). Языковая характеристика деревень на белорусско-русском пограничье [Linguistic Characteristics of Villages on the Belarusian-Russian Borderland]. Studia Slavica (in Russian) (6). Tallinn: 264–278.
- Jankowiak, M. (2020). "Belarusian language and dialects in Latvia: history, present day, perspectives". Linguistica Lettica (28). Rīga: 94–117.
- Jankowiak, M. (2021). "Współczesne gwary białoruskie na Litwie (rejon wileński)" [Contemporary Belarusian Dialects in Lithuania (Vilnius District)]. Slavistica Vilnensis (in Polish) (66(1)). Vilnius: 85–101.
- Jankowiak, M. (2020). "Belarusian". In M. L. Greenberg (ed.). Encyclopedia of Slavic Languages and Linguistics Online. BRILL.

== See also ==
- Belarusian dialects in Poland
- Belarusian dialects in Latvia
- Belarusian dialects in Lithuania
- Belarusian dialects in Russia
- Polish language in Belarus
