= Buivydžiai Eldership =

Buivydžiai Eldership Buivydžių seniūnija
- Eldership
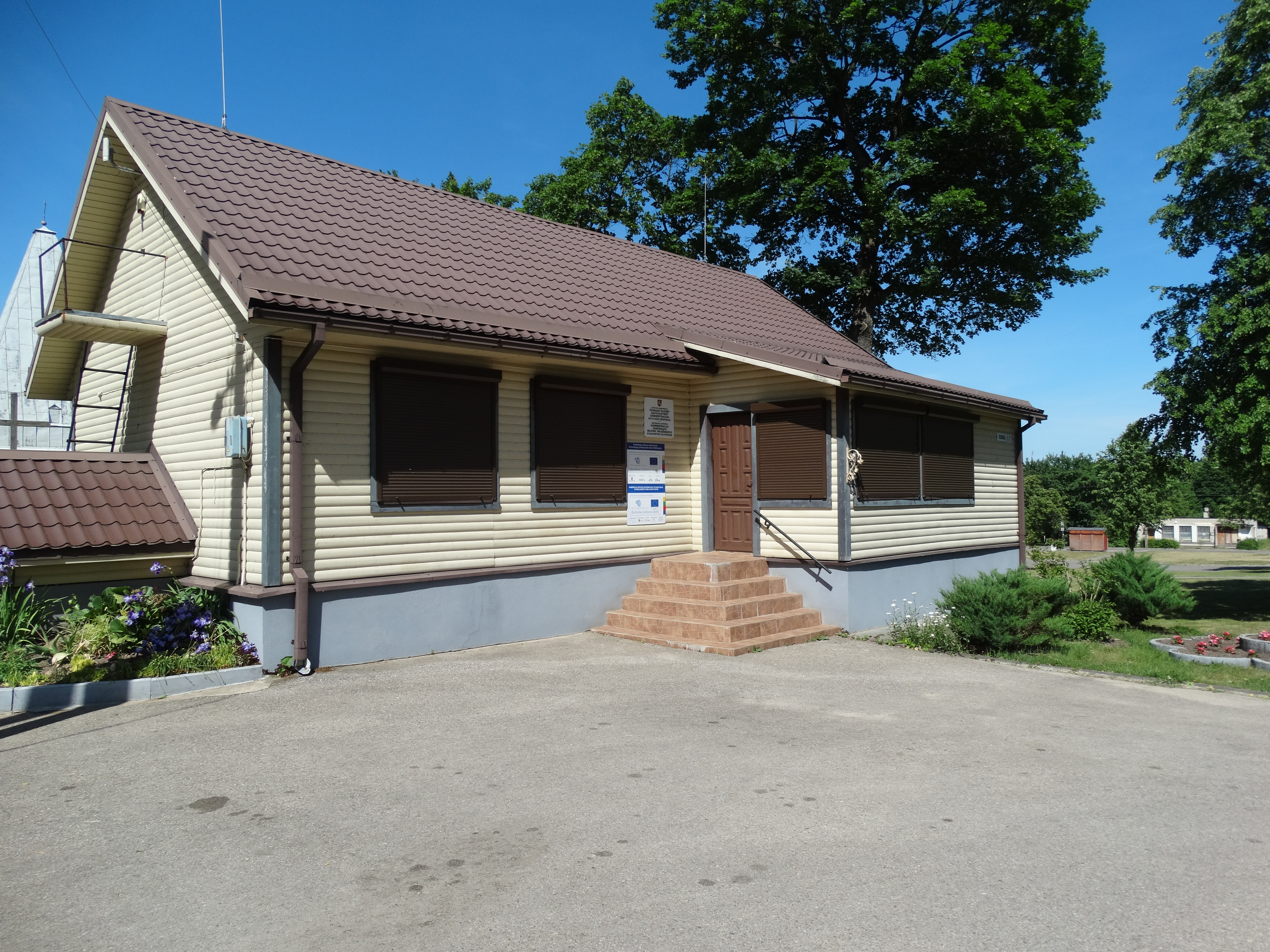
- Eldership administrative building in Bezdonys

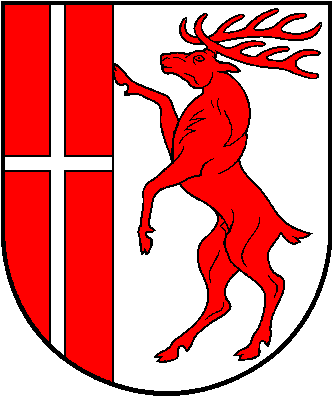
- Coat of arms

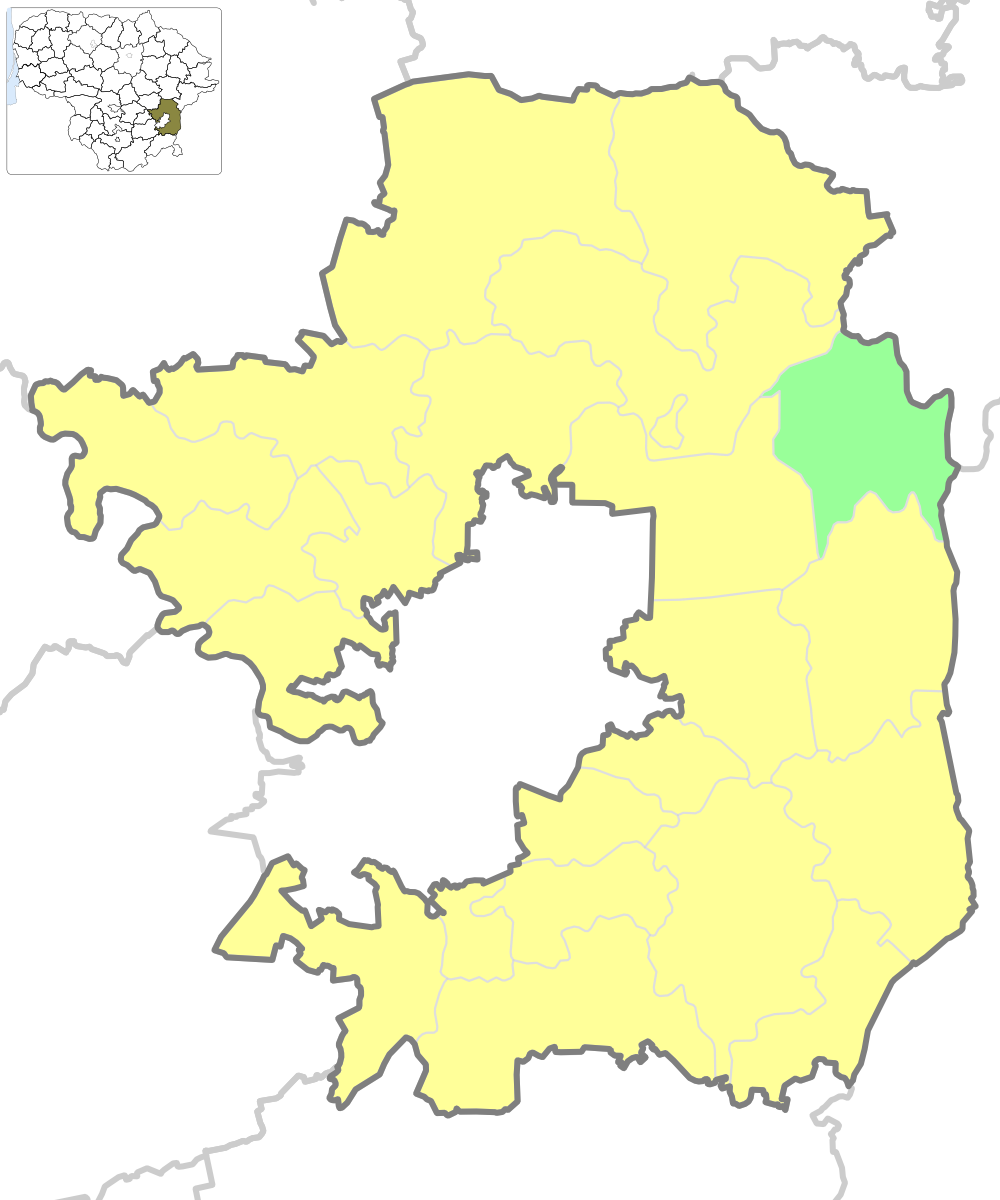
- Location of Buivydžiai Eldership
- Country: Lithuania
- Ethnographic region: Dzūkija
- County: Vilnius County
- Municipality: Vilnius District Municipality
- Administrative centre: Buivydžiai

Government
  - Elder: Miroslav Gajevski

Area
  - Total: 98.03 km^{2} (37.85 sq mi)

Population (2019)
  - Total: 908
  - Density: 9.26/km^{2} (24.0/sq mi)
- Time zone: UTC+2 (EET)
  - Summer (DST): UTC+3 (EEST)
- Website: https://www.vrsa.lt

Buivydžiai Eldership (Lithuanian: Buivydžių seniūnija) is an eldership in Lithuania, located in Vilnius District Municipality, east of Vilnius and bordering Belarus. It is the least populous eldership in the municipality.

== Etymology ==
Linguistically, the name comes from a local hydronym Buivydė, which in itself comes from a family name Buivydas. Lithuanian two-syllable archaic (sur)name Buivydas or Buitvydas — from buitis, būtis being, to be and (iš)vysti to see, literally to be born.

== Nature ==
The area is dominated by hilly forests in the Buivydžiai Upland, which in itself is part of Medininkai Upland.

== History ==
Some settlements in the area, such as Šventininkai, Maikūnai and Žvynėnai are mentioned in historical sources as early as 15th-16th century. Buivydžiai Folwark was mentioned in 1688. From the mid-17th century, the area belonged to Brzostowski family.

At the end of 18th century, the manor owners constructed a brick palace, and a wooden church nearby, which was famous for its unique classicist artwork. After the November Uprising of 1830–1831, Russian government imprisoned the owner of the manor, Michał Radziszewski, and confiscated the building.

In 1982, the old wooden church burned down, but a new brick church was built within a short time.

In 2009, the eldership was subdivided into 95 subelderships (seniūnaitijos). In 2012, the official coat of arms was approved by a presidential decree.

== Populated places ==
The eldership has 37 homesteads and 28 villages, the largest of which are Buivydžiai, Punžonys, Šventininkai and Kaniūkai.

== Notable locations ==
- Tumuli of Papunžė, Santaka, Pakalniai, Veselucha and Pilviškiai.
- Rėva hillfort - dated to the 1st millennium or early 2nd millennium.
- Pakulniškės hillfort - dated to the 1st millennium.
- Buivydžiai Manor

== Ethnic composition ==
According to the 2011 census:

- Polish - 74.3%
- Lithuanian - 11.9%
- Belarusian - 7.0%
- Russian - 4.1%

== Gallery ==
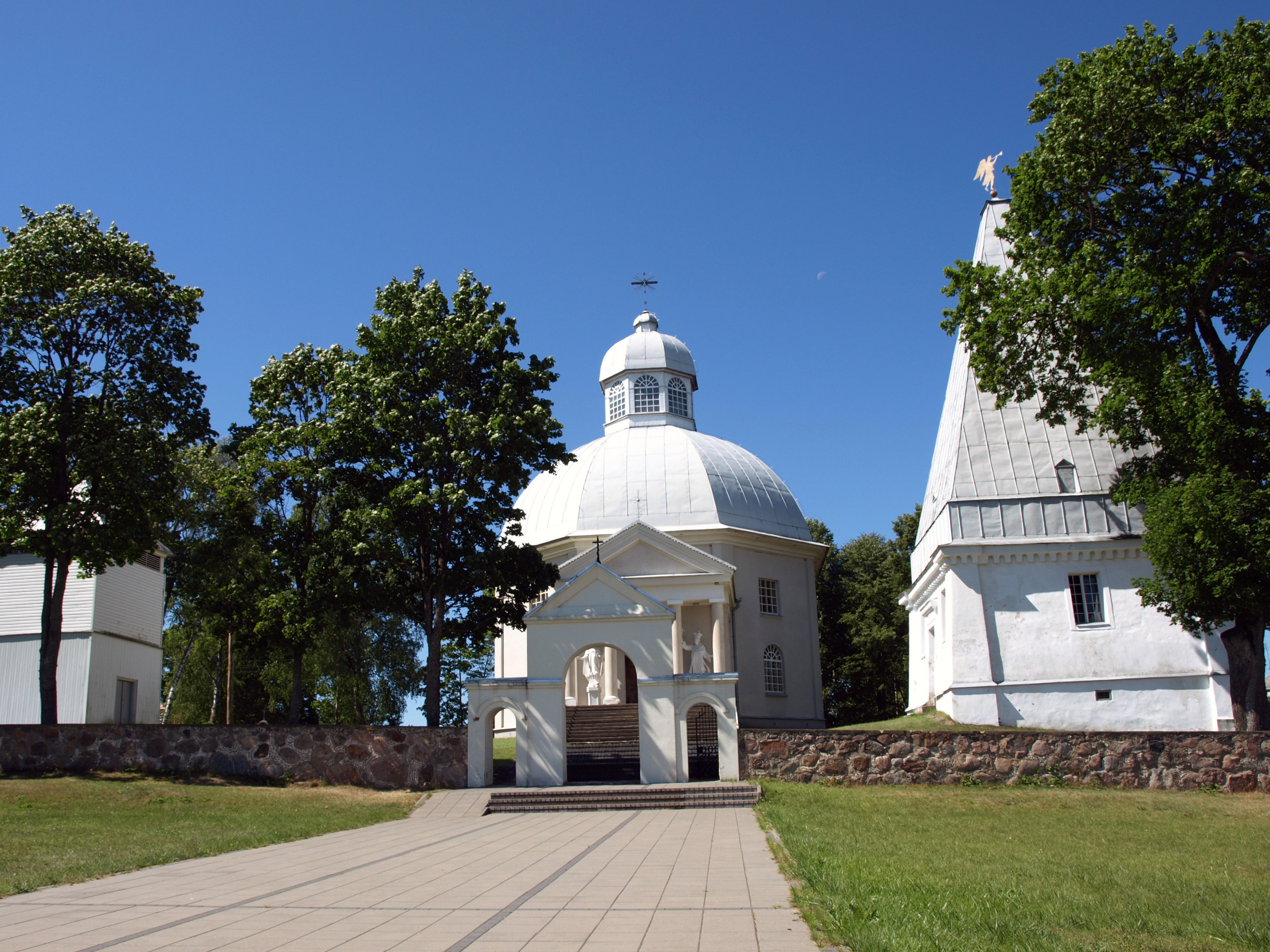
Orthodox Church in Buivydžiai

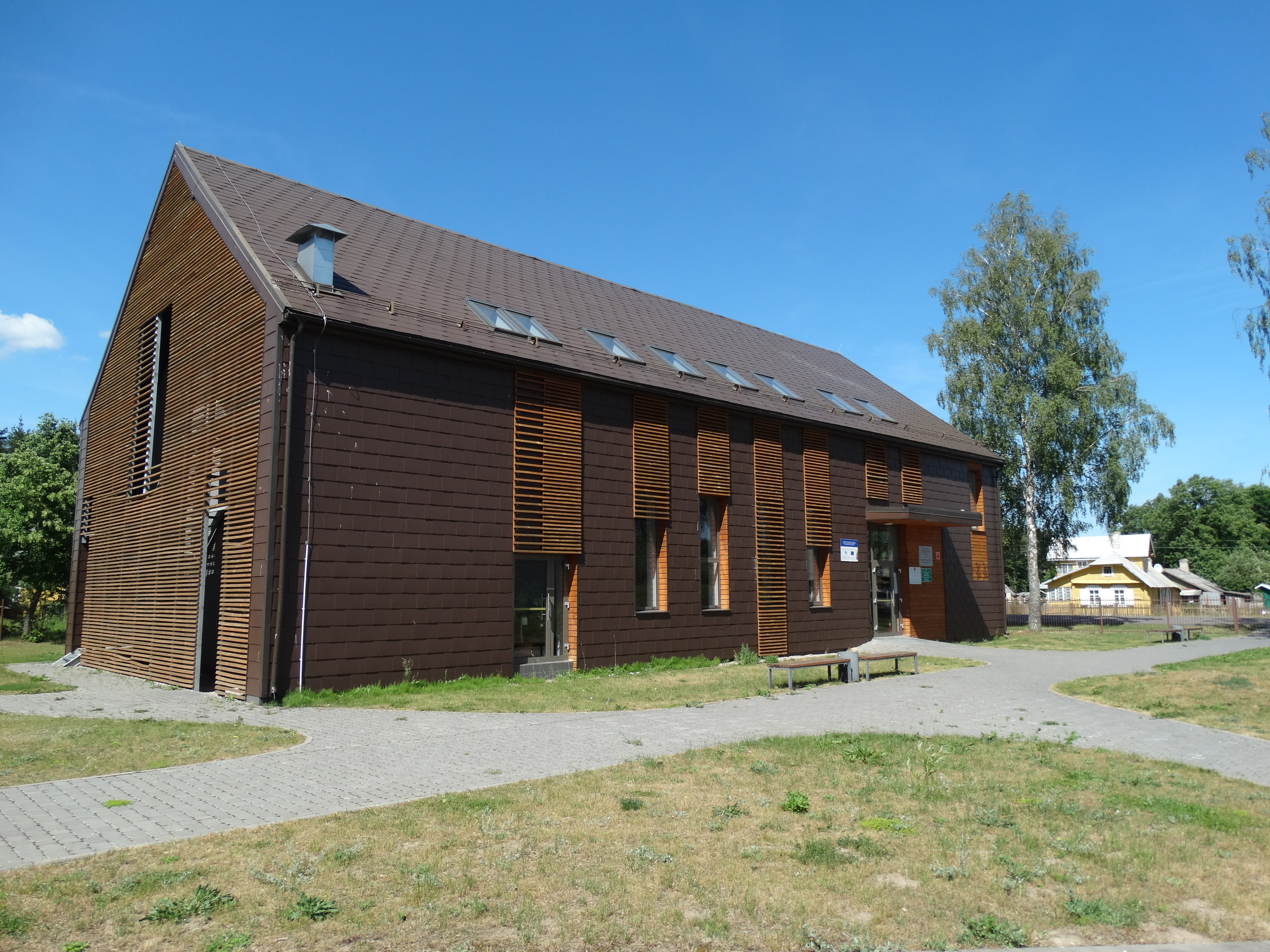
Buivydžiai community center

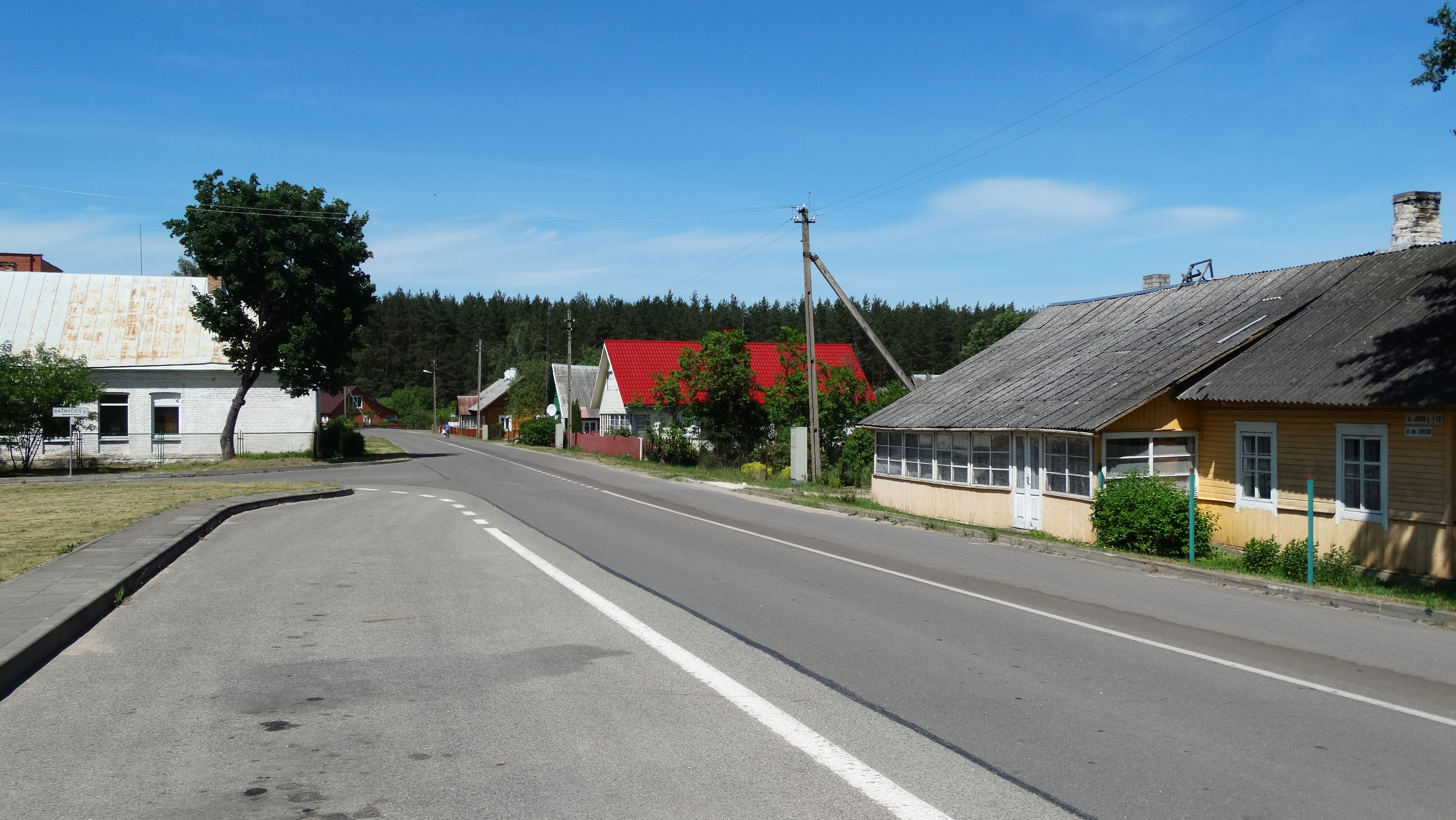
Buivydžiai in 2016

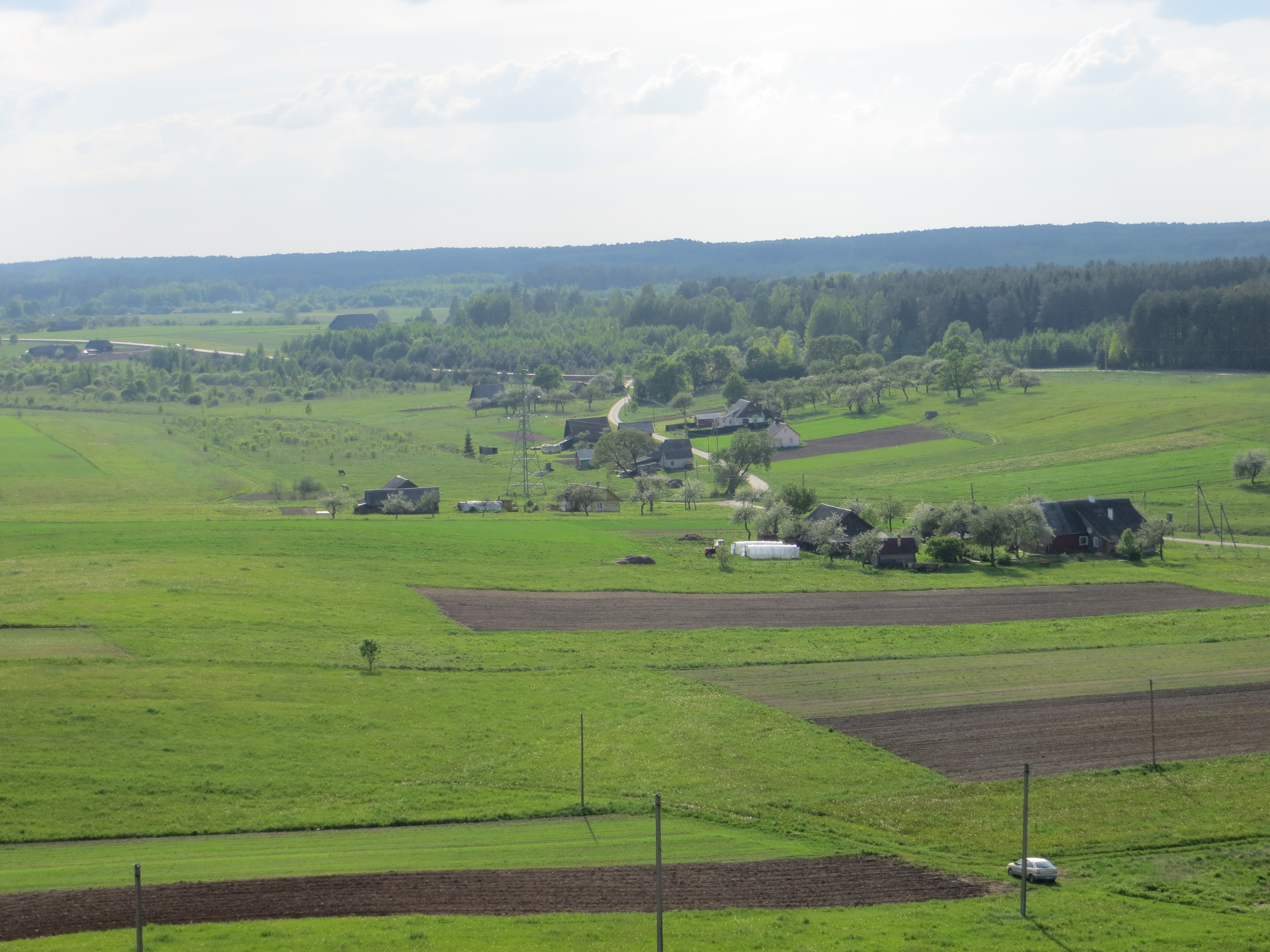
Farmland in Buivydžiai Eldership

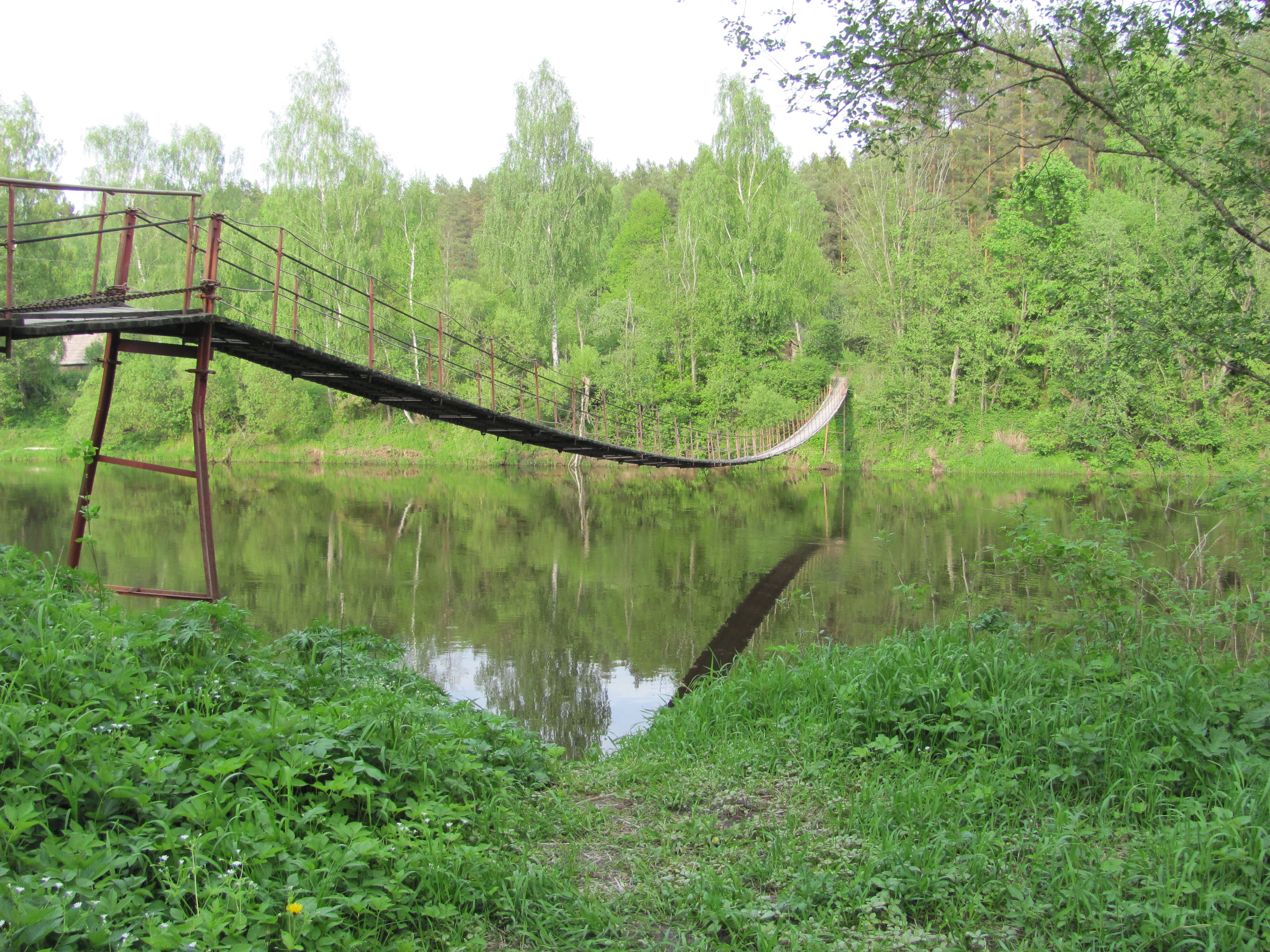
A hanging bridge across Neris

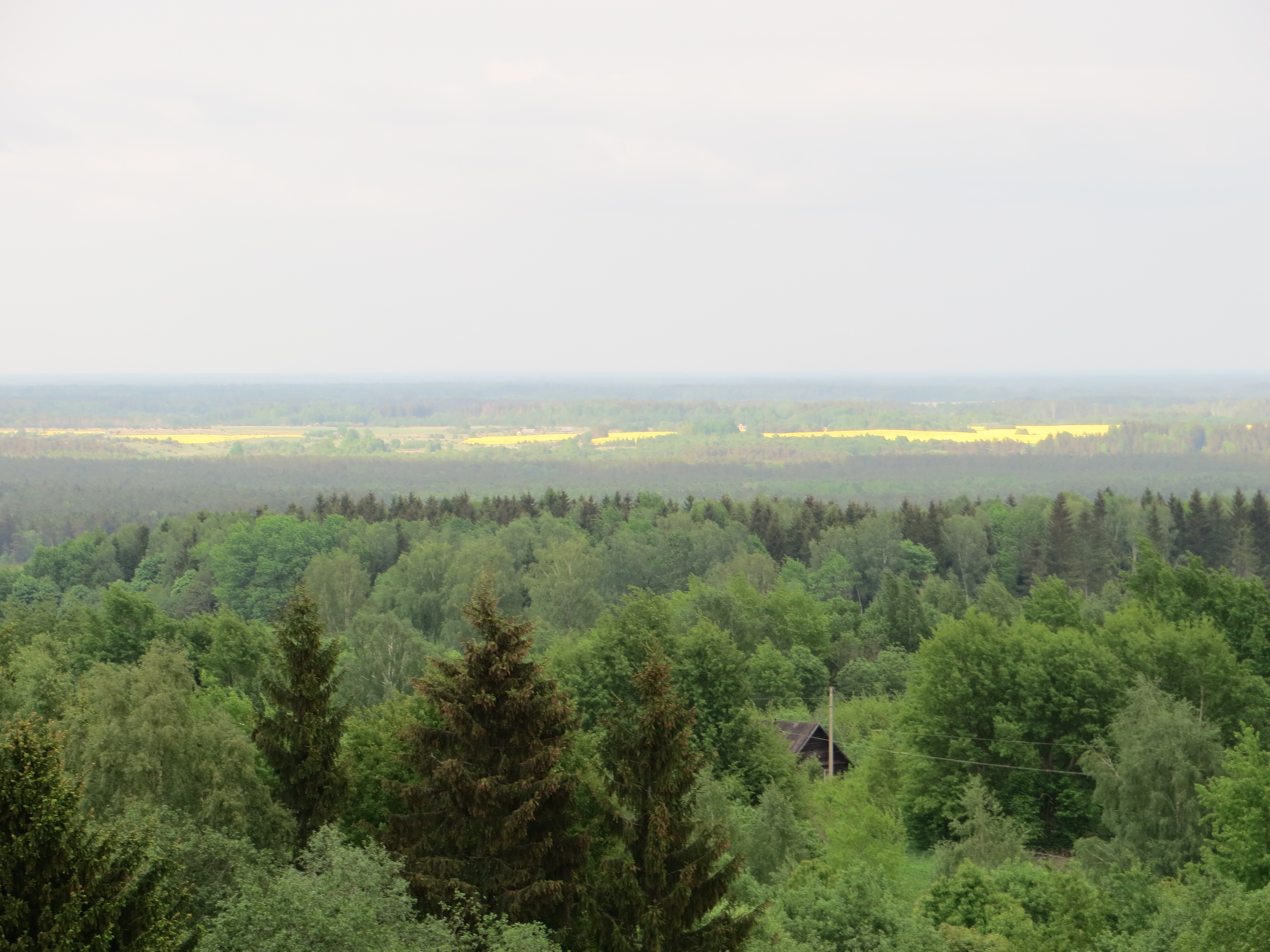
Forest in Buivydžiai

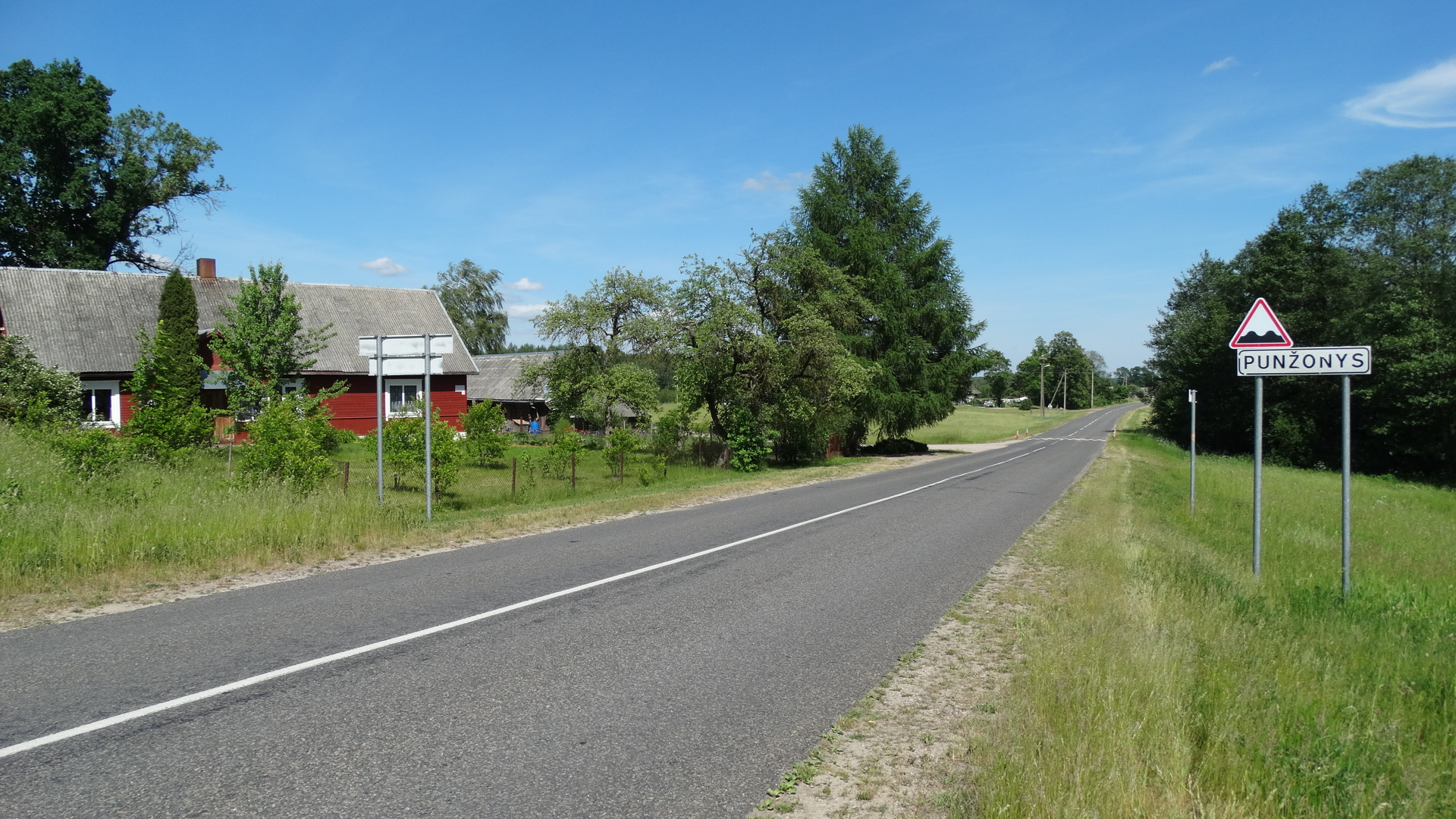
Punžonys in 2016
