= Belarusian dialects in Lithuania =

- Беларускія гаворкі ў Літве
- Native to: Lithuania
- Region: Vilnius Region (parts of Vilnius, Šalčininkai, Trakai, Švenčionys, Varėna districts)
- Native speakers: ~40,000–45,000
- Language family: Indo-European: Balto-Slavic; Slavic; East Slavic; Belarusian; North-Western zone; Belarusian dialects in Lithuania
- Early forms: Proto-Slavic: Old East Slavic; Ruthenian (Old Belarusian)
- Writing system: Cyrillic; Latin (Łacinka); Arabic (Arabitsa) (historical)

Language codes
- ISO 639-3: –
- Glottolog: None
- Linguistic situation in the Vilnius Region at the beginning of the 20th century according to Lithuanian linguist Aloyzas Vidugiris. Pink indicates Belarusian-speaking zones, green — Lithuanian-speaking, yellow — Polish-speaking.

Belarusian dialects in Lithuania (Belarusian: Беларускія гаворкі ў Літве) are regional varieties of the Belarusian language spoken primarily in the Vilnius Region of Lithuania.

They are a natural extension of the dialects from the territory of Belarus and have preserved many archaic features of the Belarusian language, combining them with influences from the Lithuanian, Polish, and Russian languages.

== History ==
From the 13th century to the end of the 18th century, all of modern Belarus belonged to the Grand Duchy of Lithuania. This facilitated the freer movement of Lithuanian and Belarusian populations. In addition, Lithuania's capital Vilnius itself was home to the Belarusian intellectual elite and became one of the most important centers of Belarusian culture. It was here that Francysk Skaryna published his Little Travel Book (c. 1522) and Apostol (1525). The printing house of Pyotr Mstislavets also operated there, where the Statute of Lithuania (1588) was printed, including in the Ruthenian (also called Old Belarusian) version.

Many prominent Belarusians and figures originating from Belarusian lands graduated from Vilnius University: Adam Mickiewicz, Jan Czeczot, Ignacy Domeyko, Maciej Kazimierz Sarbiewski, Teodor Narbutt, Władysław Syrokomla.

Vilnius was also associated with Symeon of Polotsk, Lew Sapieha, Konstanty Kalinowski, Branisłaŭ Taraškievič, Anton and Ivan Luckievič, Yanka Kupala, Yakub Kolas, Francišak Bahuševič, Vaclaŭ Lastoŭski, Maksim Bahdanovič — practically the entire Belarusian elite of the turn of the 19th and 20th centuries. The newspaper Nasha Niva was published here, and numerous books by Belarusian writers and poets were printed. At the beginning of the 20th century, the city became the most important center for the formation of the Belarusian national movement, and it was here during World War I that the idea of creating a unified Belarusian-Lithuanian state arose.

According to the first and only Russian Empire census of 1897, about 70,000 Belarusians lived in the Vilna Governorate, constituting 56% of all inhabitants of the governorate, while Lithuanians made up only 17.6%.

The interwar period was a time of vibrant Belarusian life, primarily in the Vilnius Region, which was then part of Poland. In 1923, there were 30 state Belarusian schools in the Wilno School District (compared to 1,057 Polish state and 51 private schools, 20 state Lithuanian and 40 private, 53 private Jewish schools), the Belarusian Gymnasium existed in Vilnius, 12 Belarusian newspapers were published with a total circulation of about 9,500 copies (as of 1937), and the Belarusian Deputies' Club was active.

According to the 1923 Lithuanian census, only 4,400 Belarusians officially lived within the borders of independent Lithuania (i.e., without the Vilnius Region) (unofficial data suggested about 40,000–45,000). Kaunas became the center of activity for Lithuanian Belarusians, where Belarusian organizations such as Belarusian Hut operated, along with a Belarusian National University and a theater.

=== Soviet occupation (1940–1990) ===
With the beginning of Soviet occupation, the destruction of Belarusian schooling and all forms of social and cultural activity began. Belarusian activity revived only in the 1980s. By 1990, 20 Belarusian organizations had been registered, and Belarusian schools began to open.

=== Current-day Lithuania ===
As of 2012, about 45,000 Belarusians lived in Lithuania, constituting 1.5% of the population (Russians – 8.2%, Poles – 6.9%). The Belarusian minority is very active in Lithuania.

== Study of Belarusian dialects ==
=== Interwar period ===
The issue of Belarusian dialects in Lithuanian lands was described in the interwar period by Halina Turska in her work On the Origin of Polish Language Areas in the Wilno Region. The author examines various scientific views on the emergence of Polish-speaking territories in these lands (three compact areas: Vilnius, Smalvos, and Kaunas). Based on the research of predecessors and her own field observations, she questions whether the Polonization of the Lithuanian population was preceded by Belarusization. One theory suggests that the Vilnius Region's Lithuanians first abandoned their language in favor of Belarusian, and then Belarusian in favor of Polish. The author notes that in many villages, Belarusian speech was widespread by 1919, and thus must have influenced not only Lithuanians but also the Polish language to a greater or lesser extent.

In the second part of her work, Halina Turska analyzed, among other things, Belarusianisms that spread in the Polish dialects of the Vilnius Region. She noted that the Polish language borrowed them directly from folk dialects, not from standard literary Belarusian. The researcher lists, among others, such features: akanye (ляка́рства, liakarstva), Belarusian stress (неха́й, niechaj), Belarusian suffixes, e.g., -ачы (-achy) in цяля́чы (cialiačy), forms of impersonal verbs (пекць piekć – 'to bake', пабегчы pabiehčy – 'to run'), as well as numerous lexemes: багун (bahun, wild rosemary), бульба (bulba, potato), дзёргач (dziorhach, corncrake), дрывотня (dryvotnia, woodshed), бадзяцца (badziacca, to wander), and many others.

The author notes that some Belarusianisms were known as early as the times of the Grand Duchy of Lithuania in the language of the local nobility and in the works of writers of the Romantic era, for example, akanye, as well as words: sini 'blue' in Adam Mickiewicz, tanny 'cheap' in Jan Czeczot, zajzdrość 'envy' in Łoziński.

=== Post-war period ===
After World War II, there was great interest in the study of dialects in the republics of the USSR. Among the most important international projects of that time, the 1966 expedition is worth mentioning, when Belarusian and Lithuanian dialectologists collected material (vocabulary) related to Belarusian dialects of the southeastern part of the Lithuanian Soviet Socialist Republic — settlements of the Trakai, Varėna, and Vilnius districts. In 1975, research in these territories was repeated, and in 1976, Belarusian dialects in the Ignalina and Švenčionys districts were additionally studied (also mainly lexical material). In 1977, a large Belarusian-Lithuanian-Latvian expedition took place, dedicated to the study of Belarusian dialects in the Latvian and Lithuanian SSRs. From the settlements of the Lithuanian SSR, the following were investigated: Varėna district (Naujieji Maceliai), Šalčininkai district (Strelci), Vilnius district (Liepynai , Sudervė, Grikiniai, Vydautiškės, Švedai), Trakai district (Senieji Trakai, Strakiškės), Šalčininkai district (Gimžiai), Ignalina district (Laipuškės). The collected material was included in the Dictionary of Belarusian Dialects of North-Western Belarus and its Borderlands, published in 1979–1986.

The materials collected during these expeditions were used in her scientific work by Elena Grinaveckienė. The study of local Belarusian dialects was carried out by Valeriy Chekman, who also researched the Polish language in the Vilnius Region, the language of Old Believers, and Pskov dialects, as well as by Fiodar Klimchuk.

=== Modern times ===
Currently, interest in Belarusian dialects is shown by Lilija Plygavka, head of the Center for Belarusian Language, Literature and Ethnoculture of the Vilnius Pedagogical University, and Aliaksandr Adamkovič from the Institute of the Lithuanian Language. These researchers participated in the work on the updated version of the Atlas of the Lithuanian Language and were responsible for the part concerning Belarusian dialects. In the old version of the atlas, Belarusian dialects and the Northern Borderland Polish language were not taken into account. Material collection began in July 2011 in the villages of Šalčininkai, Vilnius, and Švenčionys districts. In total, it was planned to investigate about 50 villages where the population uses Belarusian dialects. These are the first such comprehensive studies of Belarusian dialects in Lithuania after the collapse of the USSR.

Lilija Plygavka is also the author of the monograph The Belarusian Language in Lithuania: Sociocultural and Linguistic Aspects and articles dedicated to Belarusian dialects.

A rich private archive of modern recordings of Belarusian dialects is also held by ethnologist Yury Unukovich, who studies Belarusians in Lithuania. The Institute of Historical Research of Belarus of the European Humanities University also has an archive of materials collected by students during their numerous field expeditions.

Among Polish linguists, the problem of the Belarusian-Polish-Baltic borderland has been most extensively studied by Elżbieta Smułkowa (issues of language interference, methods of researching dialects in borderlands, multilingualism of the population). The issue of Belarusian dialects, along with the description of Northern Borderlands Polish, was also addressed by Halina Karaś, Zofia Sawaniewska-Mochowa, Anna Zielińska, and Koji Morita.

== Features of Belarusian dialects in Lithuania ==
Belarusian dialects in the Vilnius Region are a natural continuation of dialects from the territory of Belarus. Valeriy Chekman, Petras Gaučas, and Laima Grumadienė determined their area of distribution roughly from Buivydžiai in the north to Buivydiškės and Trakai in the west, and to Kalesninkai and Eišiškės in the south of Lithuania. According to traditional division, they belong to the belt of Central Belarusian dialects, and north of Nemenčinė, they approach the North-Eastern dialect. According to the division into dialect zones, they can be attributed to the North-Western zone.

Characteristic features:

- Non-dissimilative akanye and yakanye, although in the north, a transition from non-dissimilative to dissimilative is observed.
- Pronunciation of only hard and hardened r.
- Unstressed я (ya) in place of the old ять (yat) in the endings of the locative case singular of nouns: у ха́ця (u chacia, 'in the house'), у ле́ся (u liesia, 'in the forest'), which indicates full yakanye.
- Use of the lexeme фасоля (fasolia, bean) in the form фасоль (fasol).
- Form of the demonstrative pronoun with prothetic h: гэ́ны (heny, that).
- Form of the infinitive of the verb ісьці́ (iści, to go).
- Use of the past tense participle ending in -вшы (-vshy): сын у шко́лу пае́хаўшы (syn u shkolu payekhaushy, 'the son has gone to school').
- Lexemes that denote objects differently in other regions of Belarus: порткі (portki, 'trousers'), сту́дня (studnia, 'well'), абру́с (abrus, 'tablecloth'), кашу́ля (kashulia, 'shirt').
- Widespread construction of the type мне балі́ць галава́ (mnie balić halava, me [dative] hurts head) instead of у мяне́ балі́ць галава́ (u mianie balić halava, at me hurts head), which is used in other regions.
- Presence of borrowed vocabulary from other languages:
  - Polish (тэ́рас гаво́раць, ён бэ́ндзе; teras havorać, jon bendzie),
  - Russian (маладзё́ж, я харашо́ рабо́тала; maladziož, ja charasho rabotala),
  - Lithuanian (на́ша мокітая < mokytoja 'teacher'; мая́ саска́йта < sąskaita 'bill').
