= Buivydiškės Manor =

Coordinates: 54°43′14″N 25°11′50″E

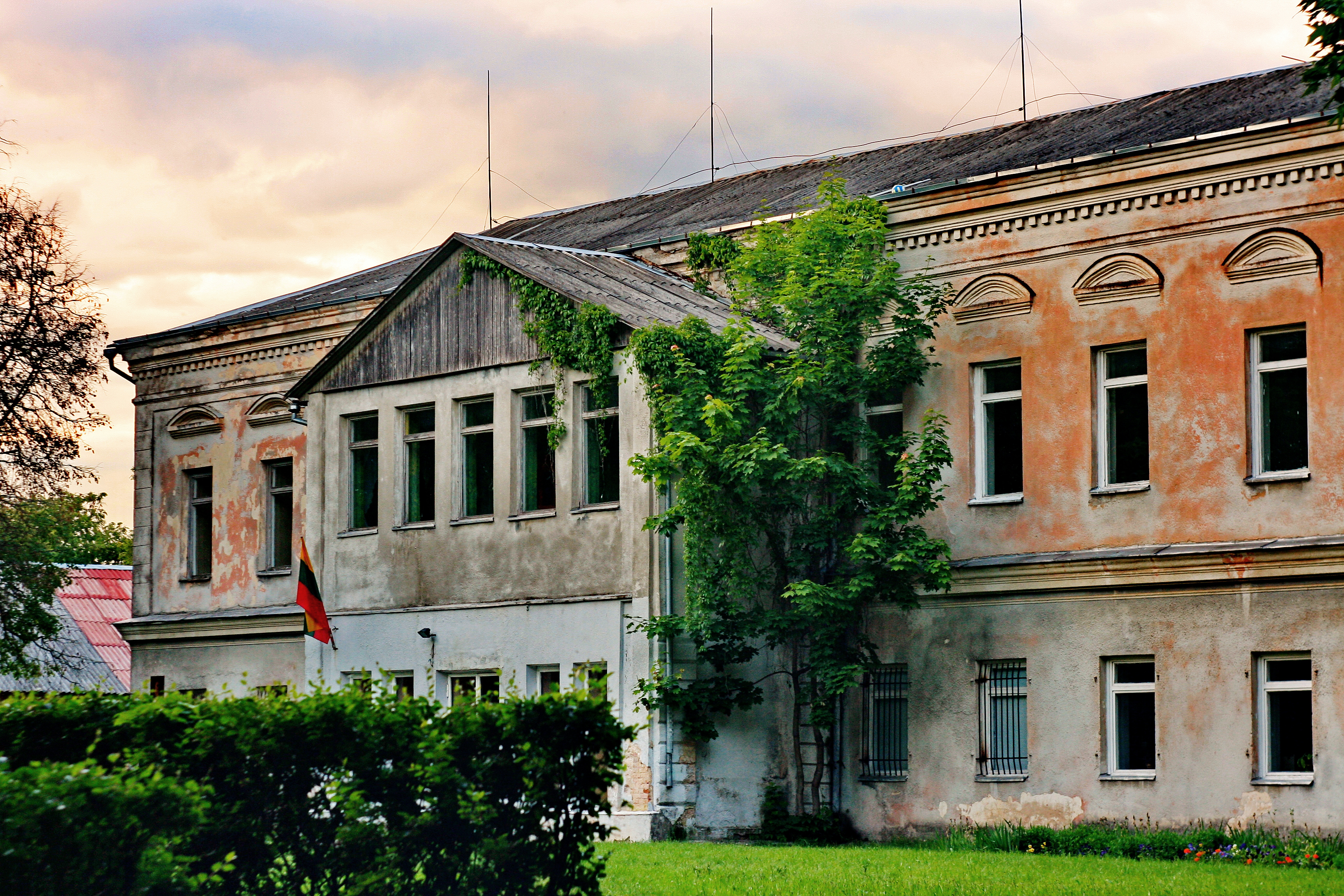
- Buivydiškės Manor (2009)
- Interactive map of the Buivydiškės Manor area

General information
- Location: Buivydiškės, Lithuania
- Current tenants: Buivydiškės primary school

Buivydiškės Manor is a former residential manor in Buivydiškės, Vilnius District Municipality, Lithuania. The last users of the main building was Buivydiškės Primary School. Currently the main palace is for sale.
