= Bujwid =

Bujwid is a Polish-Lithuanian nobility family name belonging to the Ślepowron coat of arms. The archaic feminine form is Bujwidowa (literally meaning "Bujwid's"). In modern time it is a unisex surname. Bujwid is a Polish form of the Lithuanian two-syllable archaic (sur)name Buivydas or Buitvydas — from buitis, būtis being, to be and (iš)vysti to see, literally to be born. Modern form is Buividas.

The Latvian form of the surname is Buivids. The Russified forms are Buivid or Buyvid.

The surname may refer to:

- Odo Bujwid (1857–1942), Polish bacteriologist
- Kazimiera Bujwidowa (1867–1932), Polish feminist and suffragette
- Ona Danutė Buivydaitė (born 1947), Lithuanian artist and designer.
- Jānis Buivids (1864–1937), a general in the Latvian Army.
- Vita Buivid (born 1962), Russian artist
- Ray Buivid (1915–1972), American football player

== See also ==
- Buivydžiai — a town in Vilnius district municipality
- Buivydas — a lake in Švenčionys district municipality
- There are 6 villages in Lithuania named Buivydai.
- Buivydiškės – a village in Vilnius district municipality.
