= Belarusians in Latvia =

Беларусы Латвіі

Total population
- 57,319 (2022)

Regions with significant populations
- Rīga, Latgalia

Languages
- Belarusian, Latvian, Russian

Religion
- christianity, especially catholicism and Orthodox Church

Belarusians in Latvia (Belarusian: Беларусы Латвіі, romanized: Biełarusy Łatvii; Latvian: Latvijas baltkrievi) make up a minority group within the country, representing about 3 per cent of the population.

== Number ==
According to 2017 statistics, 69.3 thousands of the inhabitants of Latvia identify themselves as ethnic Belarusians, which is slightly higher than according to the 2011 census (68 202) but still much lower than the numbers for 1989 and 2000.

The border regions of Latvia are predominantly inhabited by Belarusians, there is a Belarusian school in Riga and several Belarusian organizations.

== History ==
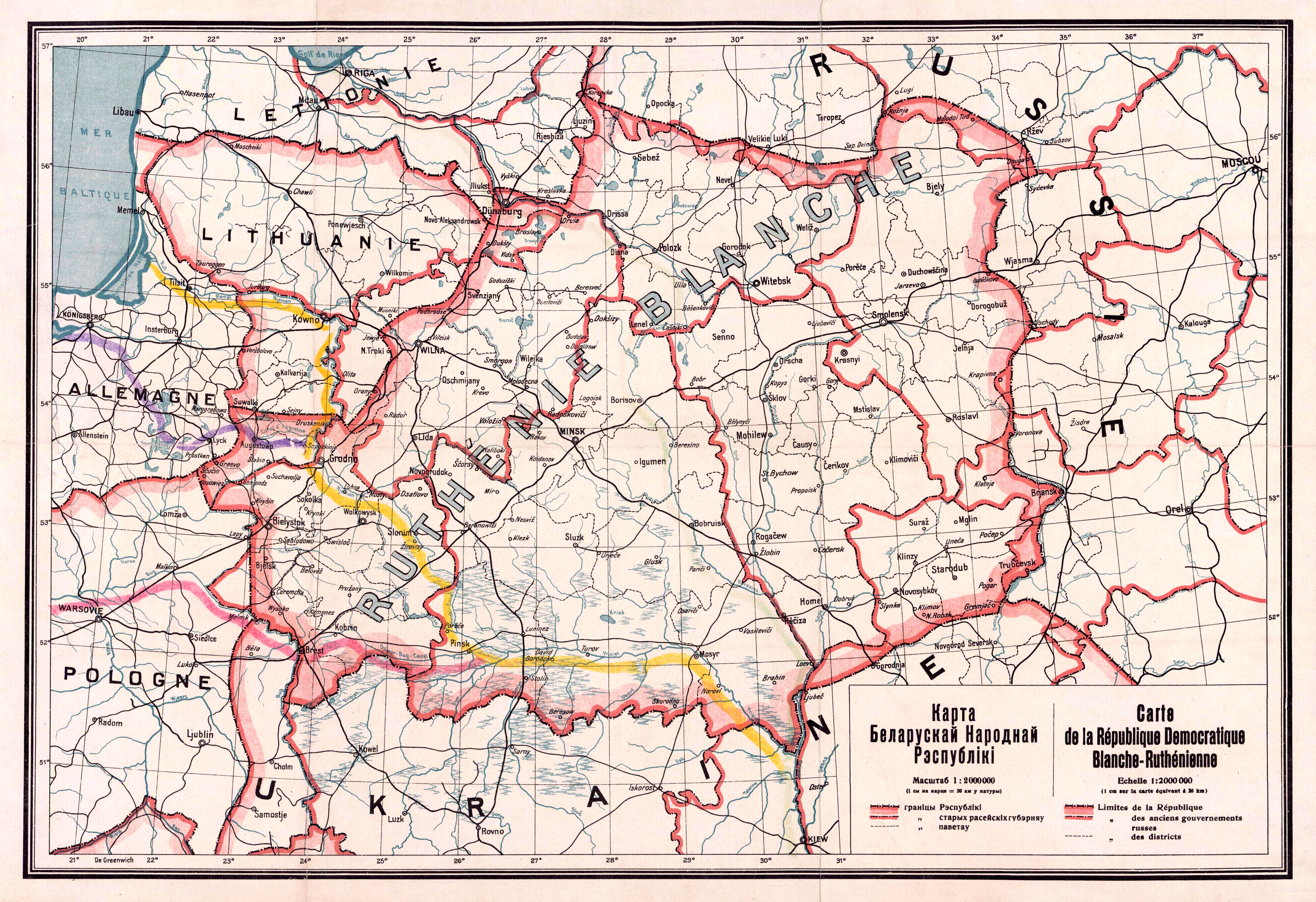
Map of the Belarusian Democratic Republic, 1918

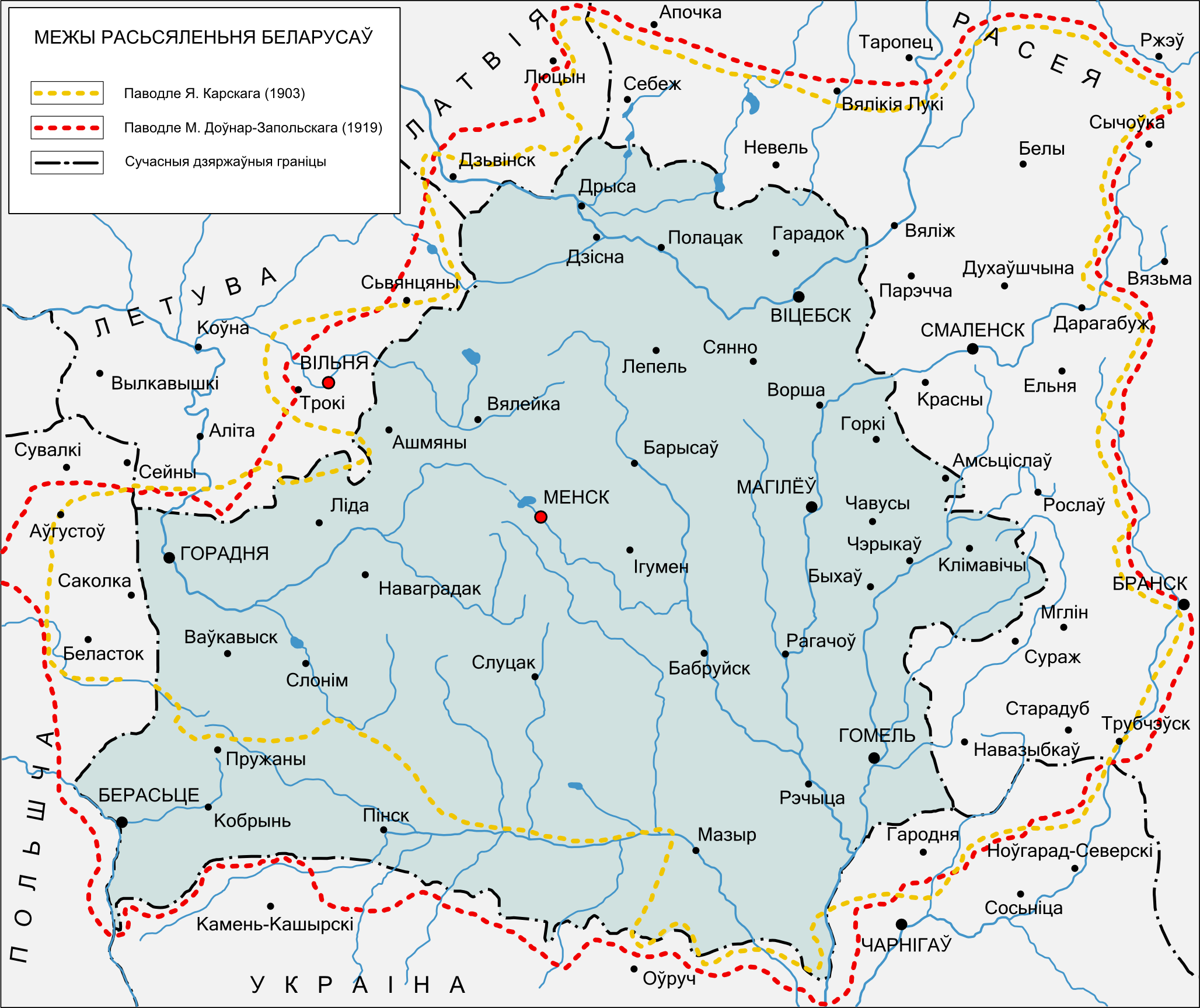
Borders of regions with a majority Belarusian population according to research by ethnographers Jaŭchim Karski (1903, yellow border) and Mitrafan Doŭnar-Zapolski (1919, red border), and the territory of Belarus post 1991 (green area)

According to research by the early 20th century ethnographers Jaŭchim Karski and Mitrafan Doŭnar-Zapolski, the territory of modern Latvia is a home to an autochthonous Belarusian population in southern Latgalia. Daugavpils (Belarusian: Дзвінск, Dzvinsk) and the territory of southern Latgalia were declared part of the Belarusian Democratic Republic in 1918 and the Soviet Socialist Republic of Belarus in 1919 but were then transferred by the bolsheviks to the independent Latvia.

After Latvia gained independence, several organizations of the Belarusian minority were established in the country, as well as about 40 Belarusian schools, two Belarusian lyceums, two theatres (in Riga and Daugavpils), a newspaper and several magazines.

After the 1934 Latvian coup d'état, the Belarusian education in Latvia began to feel pressure from the officials and was completely shut down by 1940 when the country was occupied by the USSR and later for a few years by Nazi Germany.

During the Soviet occupation, Latvia saw an influx of migrants from Belarus.

During the Perestroika, new organizations of the Belarusian minority have been established. After the country restored its independence, some ethnic Belarusians left for Belarus.

== Belarusians in Latvia ==
- Kastuś Jezavitaŭ, politician and minister of defence of the Belarusian Democratic Republic, born in Daugavpils
- Janka Maŭr, writer, born in Liepāja
- Viktar Valtar, writer, poet, born in Daugavpils

== See also ==
- Belarus–Latvia relations
- Belarusian diaspora
- Demographics of Latvia
