= Belarusian dialects in Latvia =

East Slavic dialects spoken in southeastern Latvia

- Беларускія гаворкі ў Латвіі
- Native to: Latvia
- Region: Latgalia, Selonia (parts of Daugavpils Municipality, Krāslava Municipality, Ludza Municipality, Augšdaugava Municipality)
- Language family: Indo-European: Balto-Slavic; Slavic; East Slavic; Belarusian; North-Eastern dialect; Belarusian dialects in Latvia
- Early forms: Old East Slavic: Ruthenian (Old Belarusian)
- Writing system: Cyrillic

Language codes
- ISO 639-3: –
- Glottolog: None

Belarusian dialects in Latvia are autochthonous and migrant varieties of the Belarusian language spoken in the southeastern part of Latvia (mainly in Latgalia and Selonia), along the border with Belarus and Russia. Historically, these dialects occupied a significant area in the districts of Ilūkste, Daugavpils, Krāslava, and Ludza.

In the 21st century, these dialects are in a state of decline and are often referred to by their speakers as "simple speech" (prostaya mova) or "mixed language".

== History of research ==
=== Imperial period ===
The first systematic study of these dialects was undertaken by the linguist Yefim Karsky. During his expedition in 1903, he visited the Ilūkste district (then Courland Governorate) and the southern part of the Daugavpils district. Karsky identified a number of phonetic and grammatical features indicating the Belarusian character of the local speech (e.g., dzekanye, tsekanye, voiced h, hard r, prothetic v).

On his "Ethnographic Map of the Belarusian Tribe" (1903), Karsky drew the boundary of Belarusian dialects along the Daugava river, including the Ilūkste area. Later, the Moscow Dialectological Commission (1914) extended the area of Belarusian dialects further north of the Daugava, up to Dagda.

=== Soviet period ===
After World War II, research was resumed by linguists from the BSSR and the Latvian SSR. In 1977, a joint expedition was organized, involving researchers such as Aina Blinkena and Antons Breidaks from Riga and Fiodar Klimchuk from Minsk. They surveyed villages in the Daugavpils, Krāslava, and Ludza districts. The collected materials were used in the Dictionary of Belarusian Dialects of North-Western Belarus and its Borderlands (published 1979–1986).

== Geographic distribution ==
According to modern field research conducted by Mirosław Jankowiak in 2004–2019, traces of Belarusian dialects have been confirmed in the following areas:

- Ludza and Zilupe area: Historically, the area around Zilupe (e.g., Pasiene) was inhabited by Belarusian speakers. Karsky classified these dialects as "transitional" with significant Russian influence (e.g., soft r). Currently, the area is heavily Russified.
- Krāslava area: The region south and east of Krāslava (e.g., Indra, Piedruja, Kaplava) preserved Belarusian dialects the longest. In the interwar period, many residents here identified as Poles, but linguistically used Belarusian vernacular.
- Daugavpils area: The area south and east of Daugavpils (e.g., Saliena, Skrudaliena, Laucesa) was historically a compact Belarusian-speaking zone.
- Ilūkste area: Historically described as Belarusian-speaking by Karsky, but currently dominated by Latvian and Polish languages.

== Linguistic features ==
The Belarusian dialects in Latvia mostly belong to the North-Eastern dialect group, but often exhibit transitional features towards Russian dialects (especially in the north) or show strong influences from Polish and Latgalian.

Key features identified by researchers include:

- Phonetics:
  - Akanye (strong in the south, weaker in the north).
  - Dzekanye and Tsekanye (dz instead of d, ts instead of t).
  - Voiced fricative h (г).
  - Hard r (in southern areas), while in northern areas (near Zilupe), r was historically soft (miakkayeravyya dialects).
  - Bilabial ŭ (ў).
- Morphology:
  - Distinctive verb forms (e.g., biareć, idzieć).
  - Specific pronouns and endings influenced by neighboring languages.

== Sociolinguistic situation ==
In the 21st century, the Belarusian dialects in Latvia are critically endangered. They are spoken primarily by the oldest generation (born in the 1920s–1940s). The middle and younger generations have largely shifted to Russian (as a lingua franca) or Latvian.

A significant portion of the speakers in the southeastern part of Latvia (especially Catholics) identifies as Poles, despite speaking a Belarusian dialect in everyday life. They refer to their language as prostaya mova ("simple speech") or "mixed language", distinguishing it from "high" languages like Polish or Russian.

== See also ==
- Belarusians in Latvia
- Prostaya mova
- Tutejszy
- Latgalian language

== Bibliography ==
- Jankowiak, Mirosław (2024). "Granice zasięgu gwar białoruskich w świetle badań lingwistów. Część II: pogranicze białorusko-łotewskie" [The limits of the range of Belarusian dialects in the research of linguists. Part II: The Belarusian-Latvian borderland]. Acta Albaruthenica (in Polish). 24: 113–133. doi:10.31338/2720-698Xaa.24.7.
- Карский, Е. Ф. (1903). Белорусы. Т. 1 [Belarusians. Vol. 1] (in Russian). Warszawa.
- Дурново, Н. Н.; Соколов, Н. Н.; Ушаков, Д. Н. (1915). Опыт диалектологической карты русского языка в Европе [Attempt at a Dialectological Map of the Russian Language in Europe] (in Russian). Moscow.
