= Belarusian dialects in Russia =

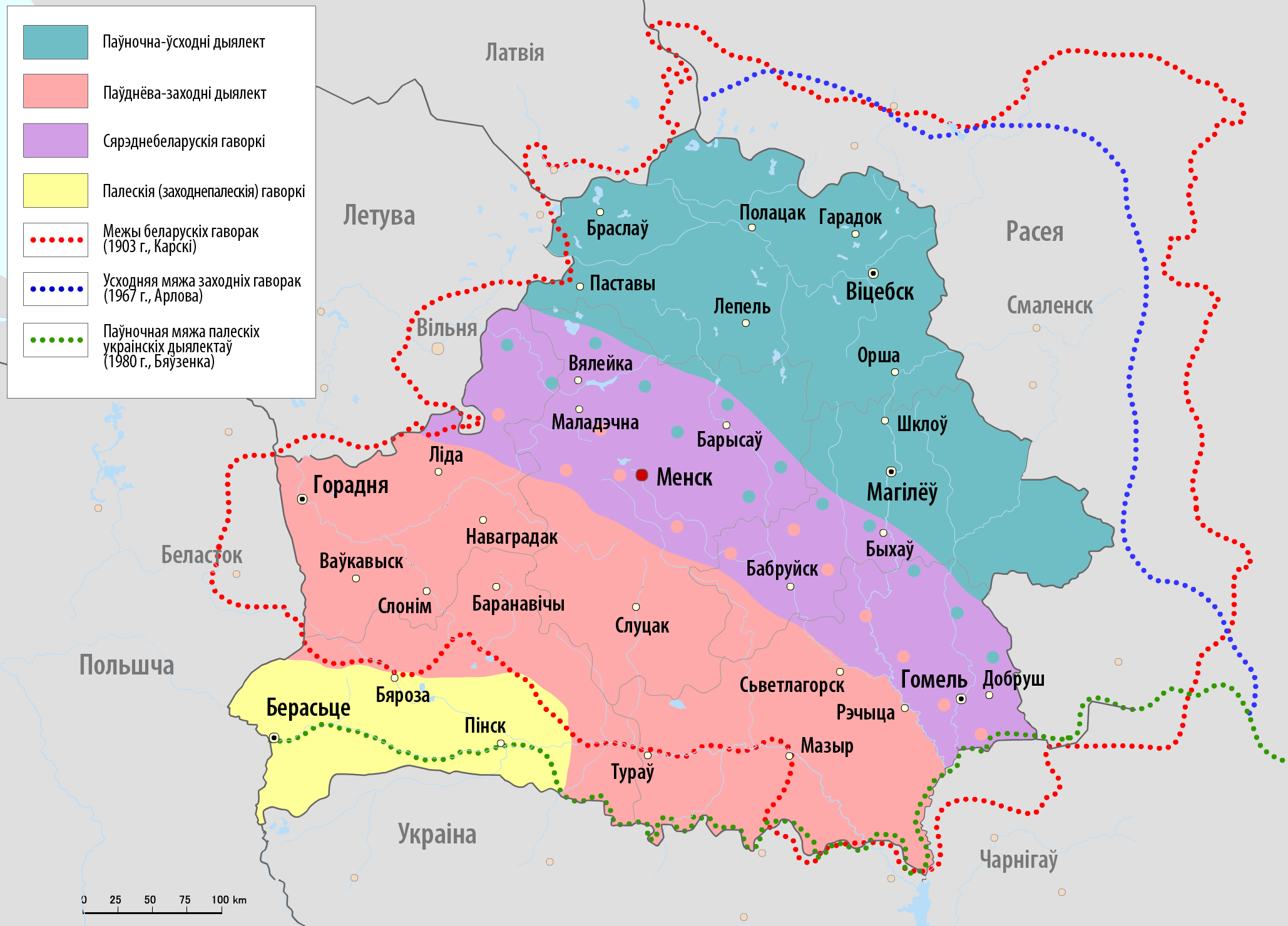
The borders of Belarusian dialects, according to researchers Yevkhim Korsag and Varvara Orlova, extend far to the east and north of the modern borders of Belarus.

Belarusian dialects in Russia (Belarusian: Беларускія гаворкі ў Расіі) refers to the functioning of Belarusian dialects among the autochthonous population and migrants on the territory of the Russian Federation. The regions of the Smolensk region, western Bryansk region, and southern Pskov region have the closest historical and linguistic ties to the Belarusian language, as they belong to the ethnic border of Belarusian settlement. Additionally, the Belarusian language and its dialects have been used by resettlers in the Kaliningrad Oblast and Siberia.

== History and settlement ==
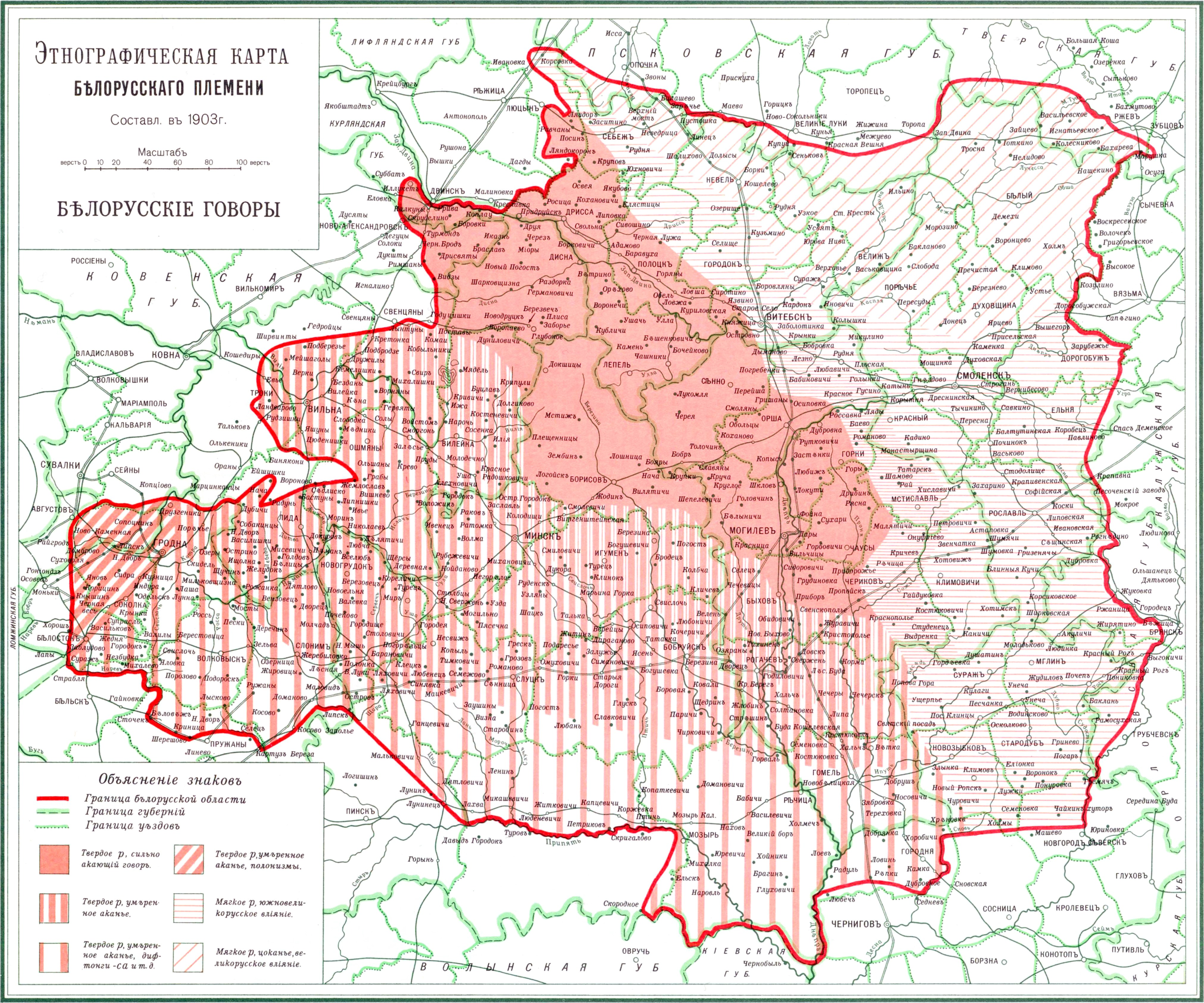
The "Ethnographic map of the Belarusian tribe", compiled in 1903 by Yefim Karsky

In European Russia, the territories with the most pronounced Belarusian linguistic influence include the Smolensk region, western Bryansk region, and southern Pskov region (the districts of the cities of Sebezh and Nevel). The processes of local dialect formation were closely linked to the socio-historical conditions on the borderlands of Russian lands and the Grand Duchy of Lithuania (GDL), and later the Polish–Lithuanian Commonwealth. The Smolensk region was annexed to the GDL in 1395 during the reign of Grand Duke Vytautas and remained part of it until 1514. Later, following the Truce of Deulino in 1619, the Smolensk region, along with the Chernihiv region, Severia, and the southern outskirts of the Pskov region, returned to the Polish–Lithuanian Commonwealth. These territories were finally lost to Russia only in 1667 under the Truce of Andrusovo. About one hundred and fifty years of coexistence within a single state contributed to the spread of linguistic features characteristic of Belarusian in the speech of the rural population of these lands. An important factor was also that until 1696, the official language of the GDL remained Old Belarusian.

Following the Partitions of Poland in 1772, an intensive Russification of the annexed territories began. Despite this, the lack of rigid administrative barriers between the Mogilev and Vitebsk regions on the one hand, and the Smolensk and Bryansk regions on the other, helped the peasantry preserve Belarusian dialects.

Besides the autochthonous lands, the Belarusian language was spoken among migrants. Between 50,000 and 100,000 Belarusians live in the Kaliningrad Oblast. This region has no autochthonous Slavic population, as it was settled after World War II. Peasants arriving from Belarusian lands initially used their native dialect. Migration processes were even reflected in toponymy, where names such as Mozyrskoye, Polessk, or Novo-Bobruysk appeared. However, due to the specific nature of the militarized region, Russification occurred here much faster than elsewhere.

Belarusians also settled in Siberia, including in southern Transbaikal. Researchers Jan Czerski and Benedykt Dybowski mentioned contacts with Belarusians who participated in the construction of the Trans-Siberian Railway (Circum-Baikal Railway). The population of the village of Kultuk doubled due to the influx of people from the Vilna, Grodno, Minsk, Vitebsk, and Smolensk governorates. Today, descendants of Belarusians live along the railway from the vicinity of Slyudyanka to the village of Vydrino.

== History of research ==
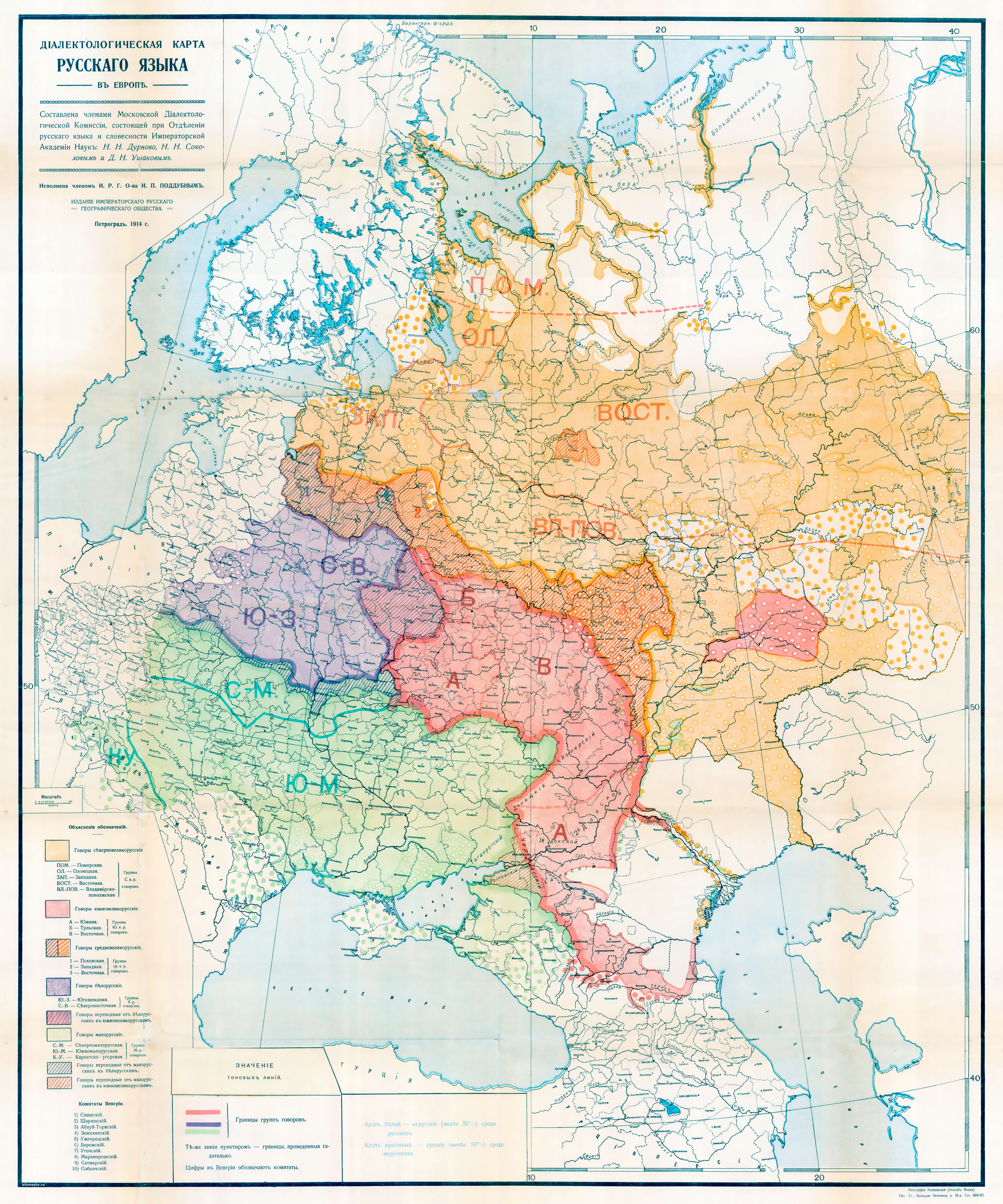
Dialectological map of the Russian language from 1914 (published in 1915).

Defining the border between Belarusian and Russian dialects has always sparked much scientific and political discussion. In the mid-19th century, Russian researcher Pyotr Shestakov noted that in the eastern districts of the Smolensk region the language had Great Russian features, while in the western ones there were numerous Belarusian and Polish elements. Renowned linguists Yefim Karsky and Aleksey Sobolevsky classified the dialects of the Smolensk region as Belarusian. On the dialectological map of the Russian language in Europe, compiled in 1915 by Nikolai Durnovo, Nikolai Sokolov, and Dmitry Ushakov, the Smolensk region was also included in the Belarusian North-Eastern dialects. Belarusian linguist Pyotr Buzuk agreed with this. In 1969, Russian researcher Nikita Tolstoy argued that practically the entire Smolensk region should be considered Belarusian.

A significant contribution to the study of the western Smolensk region and northern Bryansk region was made by Pavel Rastorguev. Initially, he classified these dialects as transitional Belarusian-South Great Russian, but later began calling them mixed, emphasizing that they have a Belarusian basis but have been subjected to systematic Russification since the 16th century. In his monograph dedicated to the dialects of the Smolensk region, he described their phonetics, morphology, and syntax in detail. After World War II, the phonetics of the western Bryansk region were studied by A. Penkovsky, the morphology by G. Demidova, and Zinaida Zhakova analyzed the linguistic ties of the Smolensk region. The syntax of the transitional Belarusian-Russian zone became the subject of study for Svetlana Prokharava, who, based on materials from ten districts of the Smolensk region, confirmed the transitional character of the local dialects.

At the present stage, Russian dialectologists often ignore the old ethnohistorical borders and view the modern administrative border as a symbolic boundary between Belarusian and Russian dialects, despite the fact that textbooks on Russian dialectology (e.g., by Kapitolina Zakharova and Varvara Orlova) record obvious Belarusian features on the territory of Russia.

== Linguistic features ==
The dialects spoken in the western part of the Russian Federation (in the Smolensk, Bryansk, and southern Pskov regions) preserve a number of typically Belarusian features that are characteristic of the North-Eastern dialect of the Belarusian language.

In the realm of phonetics, these regions are characterized by a dissimilative akanye of the Zhizdra (or Belarusian) type, which predominates or coexists with other types of akanye in the Smolensk, Bryansk, and southern Pskov regions bordering the Vitebsk region. In the Smolensk region, west of Bryansk, and in the southern part of the Pskov region, yakanye of the Zhizdra type is found.

Throughout the Smolensk and Bryansk regions, as well as in the southern Pskov region, the pronunciation of a fricative г (h [γ]) is widespread. In the western part of the Smolensk and Bryansk regions, as well as in the southern Pskov region, the pronunciation of a hard ч (ch) is sporadically recorded. A very common phenomenon is the prothetic consonant в (v) before vowels at the beginning of a word: e.g., востры (vostry, 'sharp'), вуліца (vulitsa, 'street'). This phenomenon covers a territory much wider than the historical borders of the Grand Duchy of Lithuania.

On the border with Belarus, dialectal forms such as ежджу (yezhdzhu, 'I ride') and дождж (dozhdzh, 'rain') are encountered.

In the territory of the Smolensk and western Bryansk regions, the pronunciation of the non-syllabic ў (ŭ) is widespread in the middle of a word, both before voiced and voiceless consonants, as well as at the beginning of a word: e.g., траўка (traŭka, 'grass'), праўда (praŭda, 'truth'). The sound ў (ŭ) also appears in place of a historical l at the end of past tense verbs and in the middle of nouns: e.g., упаў (upaŭ, 'fell'), доўга (doŭha, 'long'). Additionally, a final в (v) transitions to ў (ŭ) in nouns such as любоў (lyuboŭ, 'love'), дамоў (damoŭ, 'homeward'), and сталоў (staloŭ, 'of tables').

The pronunciation of soft д (d) and т (t), approximating Belarusian dzekanye and tsekanye: e.g., цёця (tsyotsya, 'aunt'), дзень (dzyen', 'day'), covers the western Smolensk region and southern Pskov region. The pronunciation of a hard р (r), characteristic of the territory formerly inhabited by the Radimichs, is recorded in the western Bryansk region. The pronunciation of geminated consonants is ubiquitous: e.g., свіньня (svin'nya, 'pig'), стульля (stul'lya, 'chairs'), плацьце (plats'tse, 'dress').

Among the morphological features identical to the Belarusian language is the presence of the ending -ах (-akh) in plural nouns in constructions with the preposition па (pa, 'along' / 'by'): e.g., па дамах (pa damakh, 'to the houses'), па трубах (pa trubakh, 'through the pipes'). In the territory of the southern Pskov and Smolensk regions, forms of masculine adjectives with the ending -эй (-ey): e.g., молодэй (molodey, 'young'), глухей (hluhey, 'deaf'), and feminine adjectives with the ending -эй (-ey) in the dative and locative cases: e.g., з молодэй (z molodey, 'with the young one'), без глухей (byez hluhey, 'without the deaf one') are often encountered.

The third-person plural pronoun often takes the form яны (yany, 'they'), and in the singular: яна (yana, 'she') and ён (yon, 'he'). Feminine dative forms such as тэй (tey, 'to that one') and аднэй (adney, 'to one') are characteristic of the entire Smolensk region, most of the Bryansk region, and the southern Pskov region.

Second-person plural verbs have the ending -іце (-itse): e.g., несі́це (nyesítse, 'carry'), and verbs of the first conjugation are characterized by constant stress on the ending: e.g., несіцё́ / несіце́ (nyesitsyó / nyesitsyé), беріцё́ / беріце́ (byeritsyó / byeritsyé, 'take'). The verbs даць (dats', 'to give') and есці (yestsi, 'to eat') in the second person singular have the forms дасі́ (dasí, 'you give') and есі́ (yesí, 'you eat').

In syntax and lexicon, combinations of the numerals два (dva, 'two'), тры (try, 'three'), and чатыры (chatyry, 'four') with plural noun forms in the nominative case stand out: e.g., два мужыкі (dva muzhyki, 'two men'), тры сталы (try staly, 'three tables').

In constructions with the preposition па (pa), the plural locative case is used: e.g., па рэках (pa rekakh, 'along the rivers'). The use of the particle ці (tsi) in interrogative sentences: e.g., ці ты быў (tsi ty byŭ, 'were you?') is widespread. Dialectal constructions like пойті в ягоды (poyti v yahady, 'to go for berries') and пойті в грібы (poyti v hriby, 'to go for mushrooms') are ubiquitous.

The lexicon of the Smolensk and Bryansk regions preserves many words identical to Belarusian ones, including буракі (buraki, 'beets'), парэчка (parechka, 'currant'), порткі (portki, 'trousers'), кавалак (kavalak, 'piece'), шлях (shlyakh, 'way/path'), не ведаць (nye vyedats, 'not to know'), птушка (ptushka, 'bird'), раптам (raptam, 'suddenly'), трохі (trokhi, 'a little'), убачыць (ubachyts, 'to see'), and others.

== Bibliography ==
- Barszczewska, N.; Jankowiak, M. (2012). Dialektologia białoruska [Belarusian dialectology] (in Polish). Warszawa: Instytut Slawistyki PAN. p. 312. ISBN 978-83-89191-14-4.
