= Belarusianism =

Linguistic borrowing from the Belarusian language

Belarusianism or Belarusism (Belarusian: беларусізм) is a word, phrase, syntactic structure, or grammatical feature borrowed from the Belarusian language into another language. Belarusisms are most commonly found in the languages of neighboring nations that have historically interacted with Belarus, primarily Russian, Lithuanian, and Polish.

== In Russian ==
Russian and Belarusian share a significant layer of common vocabulary, grammatical structure, and semantic coincidence due to their common origin. However, distinctions exist at various levels: lexical (e.g., Russian voskresenye vs. Belarusian нядзеля, nyadzelya for 'Sunday'; zashchitnik vs. абаронца, abaronca for 'defender'), phonetic (Russian features plosive g and soft r, whereas Belarusian features fricative h and hard r), and morphological. The influence of the Belarusian language on Russian was particularly significant during the formative period of the languages (late 14th – early 18th centuries). During this time, the territories of Western and South-Western Rus' (modern Belarus and Ukraine) had highly developed culture and science, particularly philology; the first Slavic-Russian grammars were compiled and printing began there nearly half a century earlier than in the Tsardom of Muscovy. Consequently, Belarusian vocabulary, syntactic devices, and socio-political terms penetrated Russian written monuments of that era.

Due to its geographical position and historical fate, Belarusian lands served as a connecting link and intermediary in cultural, economic, and political relations between the Muscovite state and the West. The annexation of territories with Belarusian population to the Russian state also facilitated the penetration of Belarusian words. A mutual influence of dialects was observed; for instance, southern Pskov dialects of Russian fell under significant Belarusian influence.

In modern Russian, Belarusisms are classified into several categories:

- Words that lack direct equivalents in Russian.
- Words that have Russian equivalents but differ in stylistic coloring or belong to regional dialects.
- Words that are similar in form but differ in the scope of their meaning.

=== Syntactic examples ===
Syntactic Belarusisms often involve the use of prepositions that differ from standard Russian usage:

- "To laugh from someone" (Russian: смеяться с [кого-л.]) instead of "to laugh at someone" (смеяться над [кем-л.]).
- "Rich on harvest" (Russian: богатый на урожай) instead of "rich in harvest" (богатый урожаем).

=== Lexical examples ===
Belarusisms appear in Russian literary texts (especially in translations of Belarusian authors) to convey local flavor, for example: хата (khata, 'house'), хлопец (khlopets, 'boy/lad'), спытать (spytats, 'to ask'), хвароба (khvaroba, 'illness'), жыта (zhyta, 'rye').

Some words are used in Russian media or colloquial speech, sometimes with political or ironic connotations:

- Мова (Mova) – used to refer specifically to the Belarusian language.
- Свядомы (Svyadomy, 'conscious') – often used ironically to refer to Belarusian national activists.
- Змагар (Zmagar, 'fighter/struggler') – used to refer to Belarusian opposition activists.
- Бульба (Bulba) – potatoes.

Common nouns found in the speech of Russians living in Belarus or familiar with the culture include вежа (vezha, 'tower'), шуфлядка (shuflyadka, 'drawer'), буська (bus'ka, 'kiss'), and кветка (kvetka, 'flower').

Students from the GDR who studied Russian in the Byelorussian SSR also sometimes picked up Belarusisms due to the inclusion of Belarusian cultural materials in their curriculum.

== In Lithuanian ==
Approximately 1,000 Belarusian words have entered the Lithuanian language. In these borrowings, the initial Belarusian fricative h (г) is usually dropped or replaced by the stop g. Slavic loanwords constitute about 1.5% of the Lithuanian vocabulary, many of which came from or via Belarusian.

=== Lexical examples ===
Common words borrowed from Belarusian include:

- anukas – from унук (unuk, 'grandson')
- baravikas – from баравік (baravik, 'boletus mushroom')
- bažnyčia – from бажніца (bažnica, 'church' or 'shrine')
- blinas – from блін (blin, 'pancake')
- botagas – from батог (batoh, 'whip')
- bùlvė – from бульба (bulba, 'potato')
- česnakas – from часнык (chasnyk, 'garlic')
- dūda – from дуда (duda, 'bagpipe')
- grybas – from грыб (hryb, 'mushroom')
- gutaryti – from гутарыць (hutaryc, 'to speak/chat')
- kisielius – from кісель (kisiel, 'kissel')
- kmỹnas – from кмен (kmien, 'caraway')
- kruopos – from крупы (krupy, 'groats')
- kùbilas – from кубел (kubiel, 'tub' or 'vat')
- miestas – from места (miesta, 'city/town')
- slyva – from сліва (sliva, 'plum')
- telyčia – from цяля (cialia, 'calf')
- vyšnia – from вішня (vishnia, 'cherry')

Additionally, some Latin and German words entered Lithuanian via Belarusian intermediation, such as kvarmas (from хворма, khvorma/form) and kvartūgas (from хвартух, khvartukh/apron).

=== Phonetic, grammatical and syntactic parallels ===
Due to the Baltic substrate in Belarusian ethnogenesis and the long historical coexistence of both nations, the languages share common features in phonetics, morphology, and syntax:

- Positional softness of consonants: For example, Lithuanian sniegas [s'n'-] corresponds to Belarusian снег (snieh), and iš miško [m'] corresponds to з лесу (z liesu, 'from the forest').
- Comparative degree construction: The use of the preposition už in Lithuanian matches the Belarusian usage of за (za). E.g., geresnis už visus — лепшы за ўсіх (liepshy za usich, 'better than everyone').
- Imperative mood: A specific form for expressing joint action, e.g., eikime — хадзем (chadziem, 'let's go'), skaitykime — чытайма (čyjtajma, 'let's read').
- Fractional numerals: Construction type pusantro — паўтара (paŭtara, 'one and a half').
- Genitive with negation: The predominant use of the genitive case with negation, e.g., negali skaityti knygos — не можа чытаць кнігі (nie moža čytać knihi, '[he/she] cannot read the book').
- Possessive construction: The use of the verb "to have" (Lit. turėti, Bel. мець) instead of the "at me is" construction common in Russian. E.g., aš turiu knygą — я маю кнігу (ja maju knihu, 'I have a book').
- Phonetic influence: In some dialects, dzekanye (affricatization) occurs, where d and t before e and i are replaced by dz and c (ts), mirroring Belarusian pronunciation (e.g., Dzievas instead of Dievas, 'God').

=== Phonetic influence ===
Belarusian influence also extended to Lithuanian phonetics, specifically in the form of dzekanye (affricatization). In some dialects, the sounds d and t before e and i were replaced by the sounds dz and c (ts), mirroring Belarusian pronunciation. Examples include Dzievas (God) instead of standard Dievas, žalcis (snake) instead of žaltis, and kaść (to dig) instead of kasti.

Such borrowings are historically prevalent among Lithuanian speakers in the Gervėčiai region and were noted in the now-extinct Zhetel dialect of Lithuanian.

== In Polish ==
Certain borrowings from Belarusian are found in eastern Polish dialects, often functioning as synonyms for standard literary vocabulary. An example is małanka ("lightning"), derived from the Belarusian маланка (malanka), which exists alongside the standard Polish błyskawica and the regional mełnia.

The Belarusian language influenced the development of the Polish language significantly during the 17th and 18th centuries, particularly in the lexicon. Polish adopted such Belarusisms as braha (home-brewed beer/mash), chwost (tail), hałas (noise), harmider (uproar/chaos), hodowla (breeding), hołoble (shafts), huba (tinder fungus), hultaj (rascal/idler), odzież (clothing), kolasa (carriage), pohaniec (pagan/heathen), sorom (shame), wiereszczaka (vereshchaka, a type of dish), ohydny (hideous), zbroja (armor/weaponry), harować (to toil), and błaho (badly).

A prominent role in the development of the Polish language in the 19th century was played by writers from the "Eastern Borderlands" who were native speakers of borderland dialects, such as Adam Mickiewicz, Eliza Orzeszkowa, Władysław Syrokomla, and Maria Konopnicka. Their language was influenced by daily contact with Belarusian dialects. In borrowed words, the stress often shifted to the penultimate syllable (e.g., brechać - to bark, makohon - pestle), nasal vowels were not restored (e.g., naduć się instead of standard Polish nadąć się - to pout), the sounds [x] and [h] were not distinguished, and the letter ł was pronounced as a bilabial [w] (like Belarusian ў, e.g., in łastowka - swallow). During this period, Polish borrowed such Belarusisms as świerzop (charlock/rapeseed), czchoć (to speed/rush), czmychać (to scurry away), pac(uk) (rat), bzykać (to buzz), kniga (lapwing), bojka (churn), capilna (flail handle), pierawiaź (band/sash), duha (arc/rainbow), śloza (tear), kidać (to throw), odliga (thaw), and others.

== In Ukrainian ==
In the modern Ukrainian language, there are several words that scholars believe to be of Belarusian origin. Examples include бадьорий (bad’oryi, 'cheerful' or 'vigorous'), бурчати (burchaty, 'to grumble'), гудити (hudyty, 'to scold' or 'to blame'), дьоготь (d’ohot’, 'tar'), жлукто (zhlukto, 'washtub' or 'hollowed tree trunk'), and щула (shchula, 'support post').

Specific lexical Belarusisms are also found in Ukrainian dialects:

- In Right-Bank Polesian dialects: мазгавня (mazhavnia, colloquial for 'head') and зекатий (zekatyi).
- In Steppe dialects: сябро (siabro, 'friend') and тутейший (tuteishyi, 'local').
- In Left-Bank Polesian dialects: ляда (liada, 'slash-and-burn forest clearing').

== See also ==
- Trasianka
- Ukrainism
- Polonism
