= Buivydžiai =

Buivydžiai Bujwidze
- Village
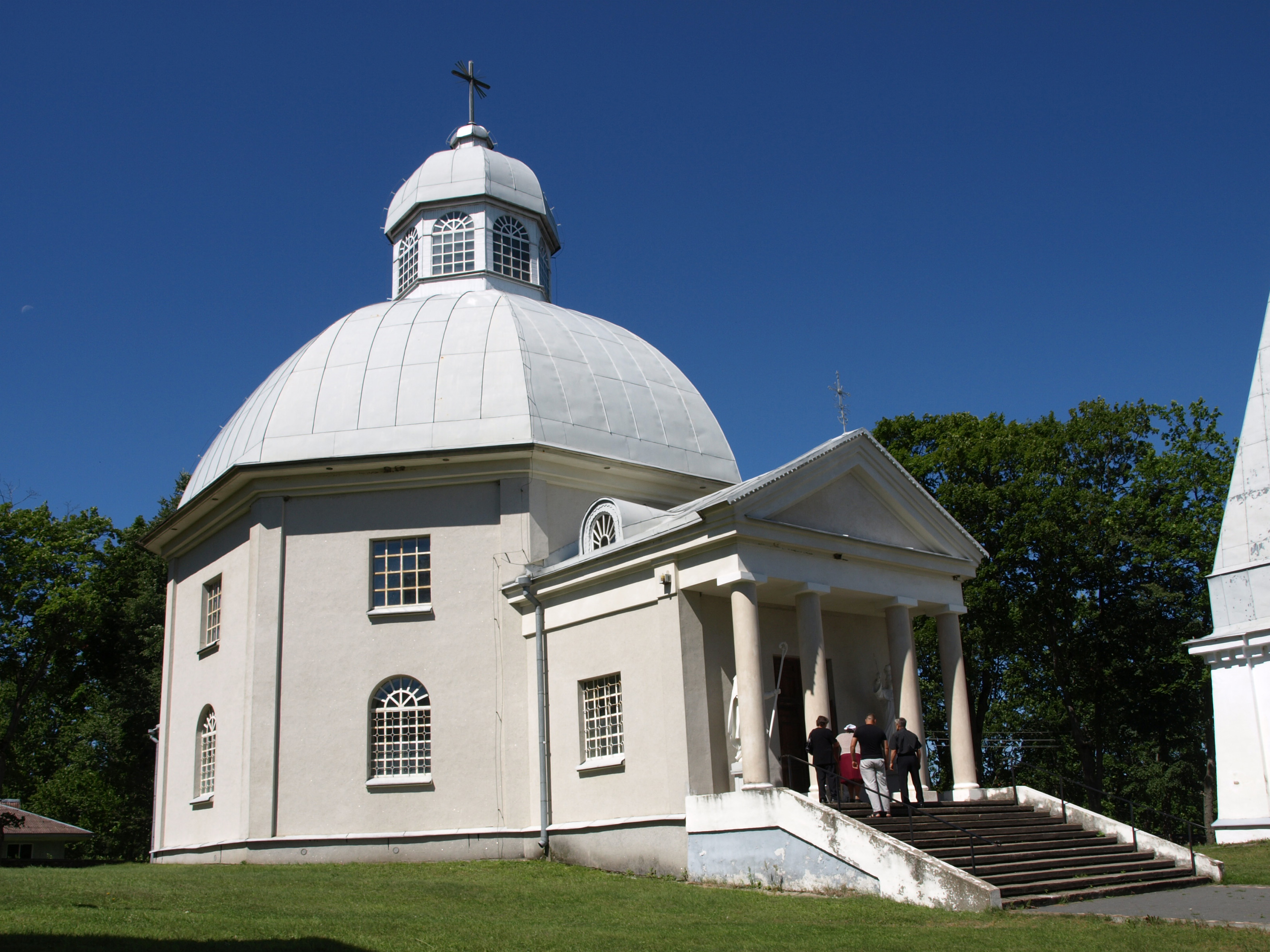
- Saint George Church, Buivydžiai

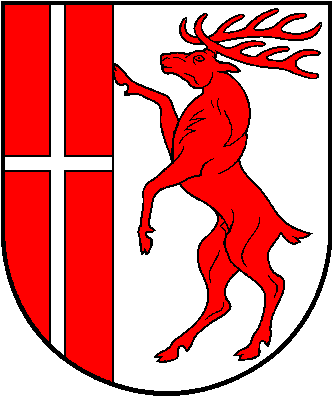
- Coat of arms

- Location of Buivydžiai
- Coordinates: 54°50′20″N 25°43′20″E
- Country: Lithuania
- County: Vilnius County
- Municipality: Vilnius District Municipality
- Eldership: Buivydžiai eldership
- Capital of: Buivydžiai eldership

Population (2021)
  - Total: 228
- Time zone: UTC+2 (EET)
  - Summer (DST): UTC+3 (EEST)

Buivydžiai (Polish: Bujwidze) is a village in Vilnius District Municipality, Lithuania. According to the 2011 census, it had 272 residents. It is located some 17 kilometres (11 mi) east of Nemenčinė and 3 kilometres (1.9 mi) west of the state border with Belarus. The village is situated on the left bank of the Neris River near its confluence with tributary Buivydė.

Early references to the place are dated by 1537. The name is most probably derived from the Lithuanian name Buivydas. The village eventually developed around a manor, acquired by noble Cyprian Brzostowski in the first half of 17th century. Later the manor was reconstructed by architect Laurynas Gucevičius.

A wooden octagonal church, named after Saint George, was built in 1785. The church burned down in 1982; a brick replacement church was completed in 1986.
