= Buivydiškės =

- Village
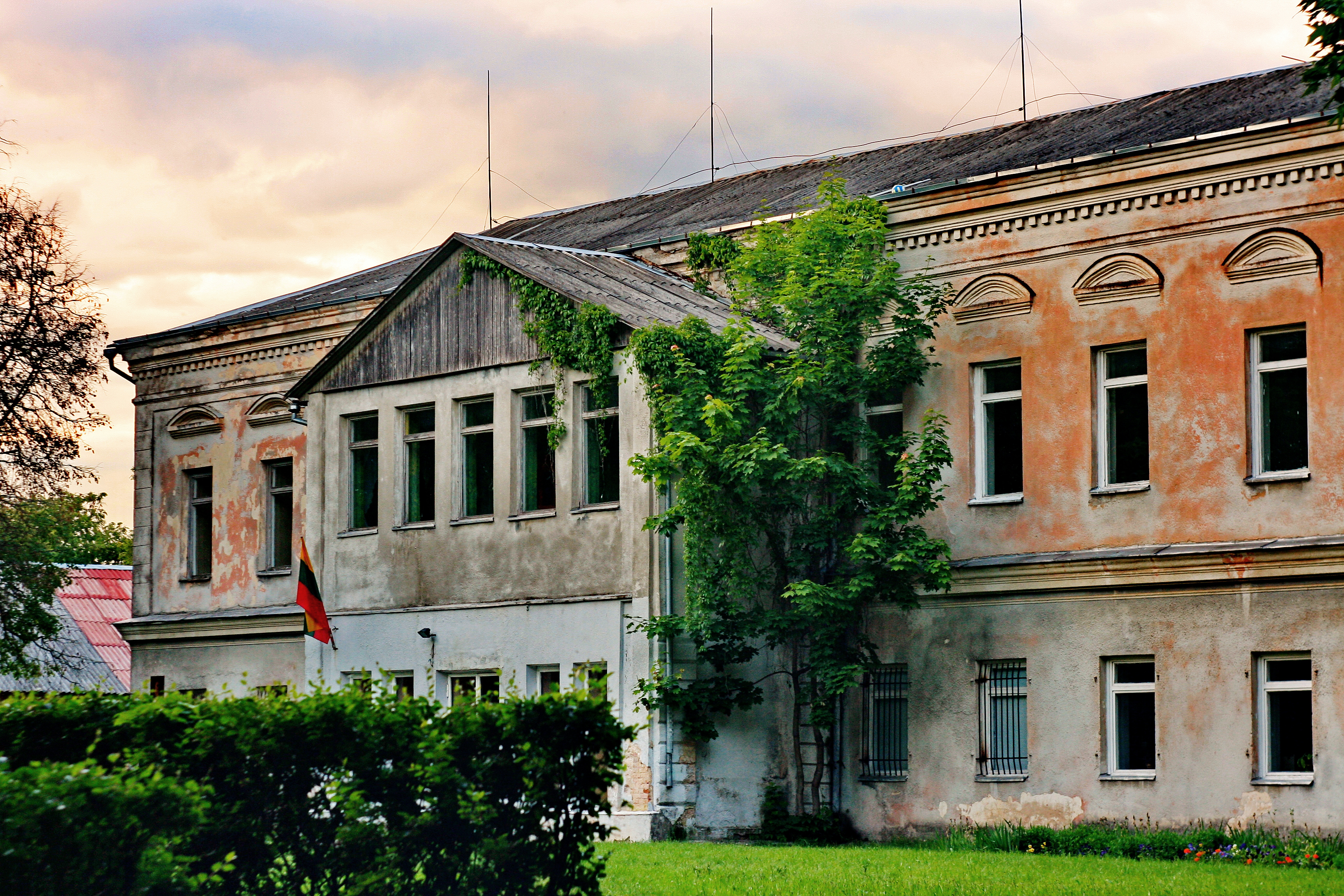
- Former manor in Buivydiškės

- Location of Buivydiškės
- Coordinates: 54°43′10″N 25°11′50″E
- Country: Lithuania
- County: Vilnius County
- Municipality: Vilnius district municipality
- Eldership: Zujūnai eldership

Population (2011)
  - Total: 1,314
- Time zone: UTC+2 (EET)
  - Summer (DST): UTC+3 (EEST)

Buivydiškės is a village in Vilnius district municipality, Lithuania. According to the 2011 census, it had 1,314 residents. Buivydiškės Manor was first mentioned in 1593. The village has a technical school for agronomy and zootechnics, established in 1961. The school helped the village to grow from 190 residents in 1959 to 1,265 in 1970. Buivydiškės became a suburb of expanding Vilnius, capital of Lithuania. In 1996, part of the settlement was transferred to Vilnius city municipality.

== History ==
Buivydiškės village was first mentioned in XIII century, in 1593 the Buivydiškės manor is being mentioned.
