= Ethnographic Map of Europe (Gabrys) =

1918 map

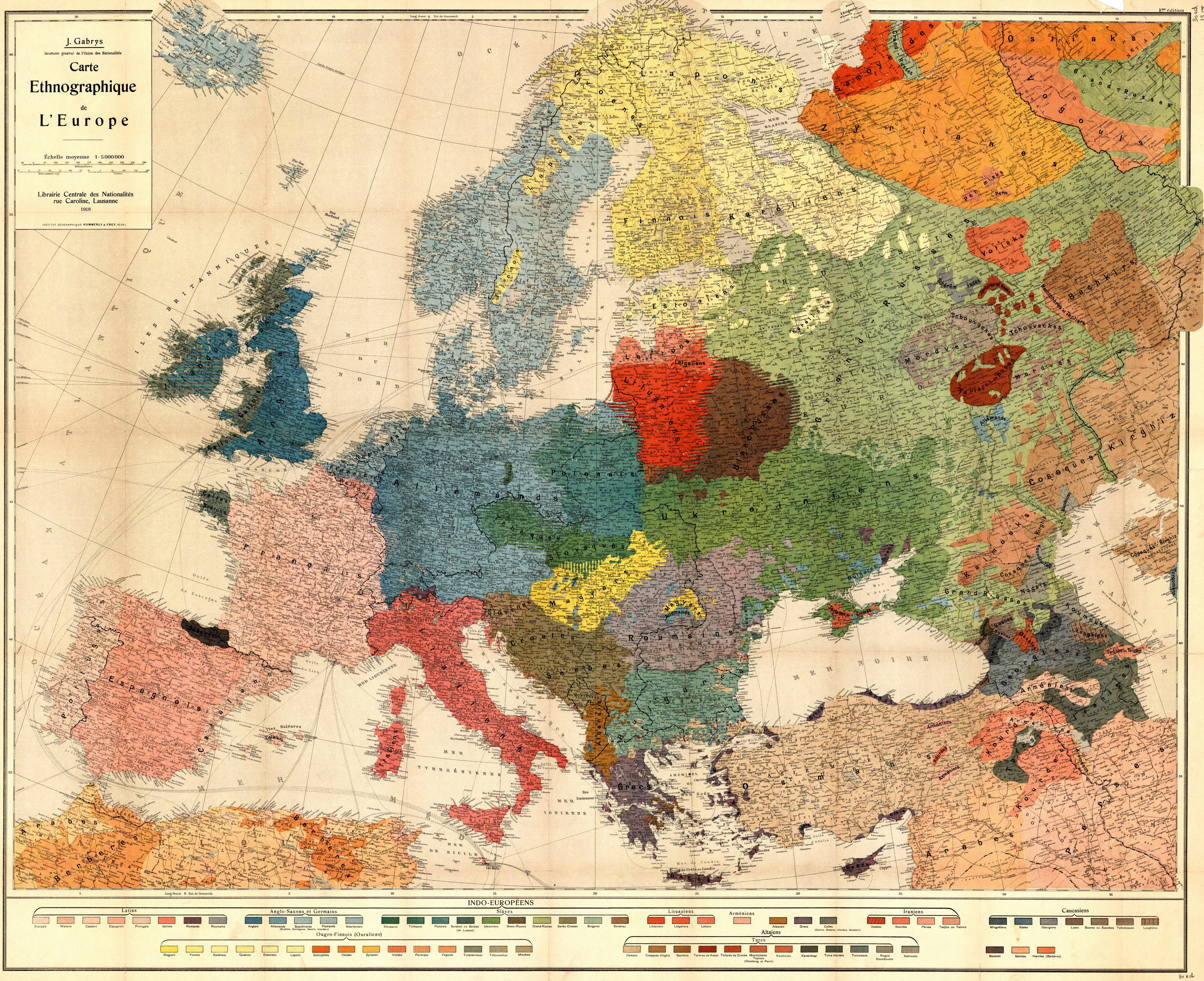
- Gabrys's "Ethnographic Map of Europe" (1918)
- Author: Juozas Gabrys-Paršaitis
- Original title: Carte ethnographique de l'Europe
- Language: French
- Subject: Ethnographic map, propaganda
- Publisher: Lithuanian Information Bureau / Kümmerly & Frey
- Publication date: 1918
- Publication place: Lausanne, Switzerland
- Media type: Map

The Ethnographic Map of Europe (French: Carte ethnographique de l'Europe) is a 1918 ethnographic map published in Lausanne, Switzerland, by the Lithuanian politician and public figure Juozas Gabrys-Paršaitis. In addition to depicting all the various ethnicities living in Europe and Asia Minor, it also served to justify the widest extension of a renascent independent Lithuania to the participants of the Paris Peace Conference, just as Lithuania was regaining its independence.

== Background and creation ==
The preparation and publication of the map were carried out under the auspices of the Lithuanian Information Bureau and financed by the Lithuanian diaspora in the United States, as well as by the German-organized League of Foreign Peoples of Russia. The map was printed by the well-known Swiss publishing house Kümmerly & Frey. The publication was deliberately dedicated to US President Woodrow Wilson, who had proclaimed the principle of national self-determination and was considered the main arbiter in the post-war reorganization of Europe.

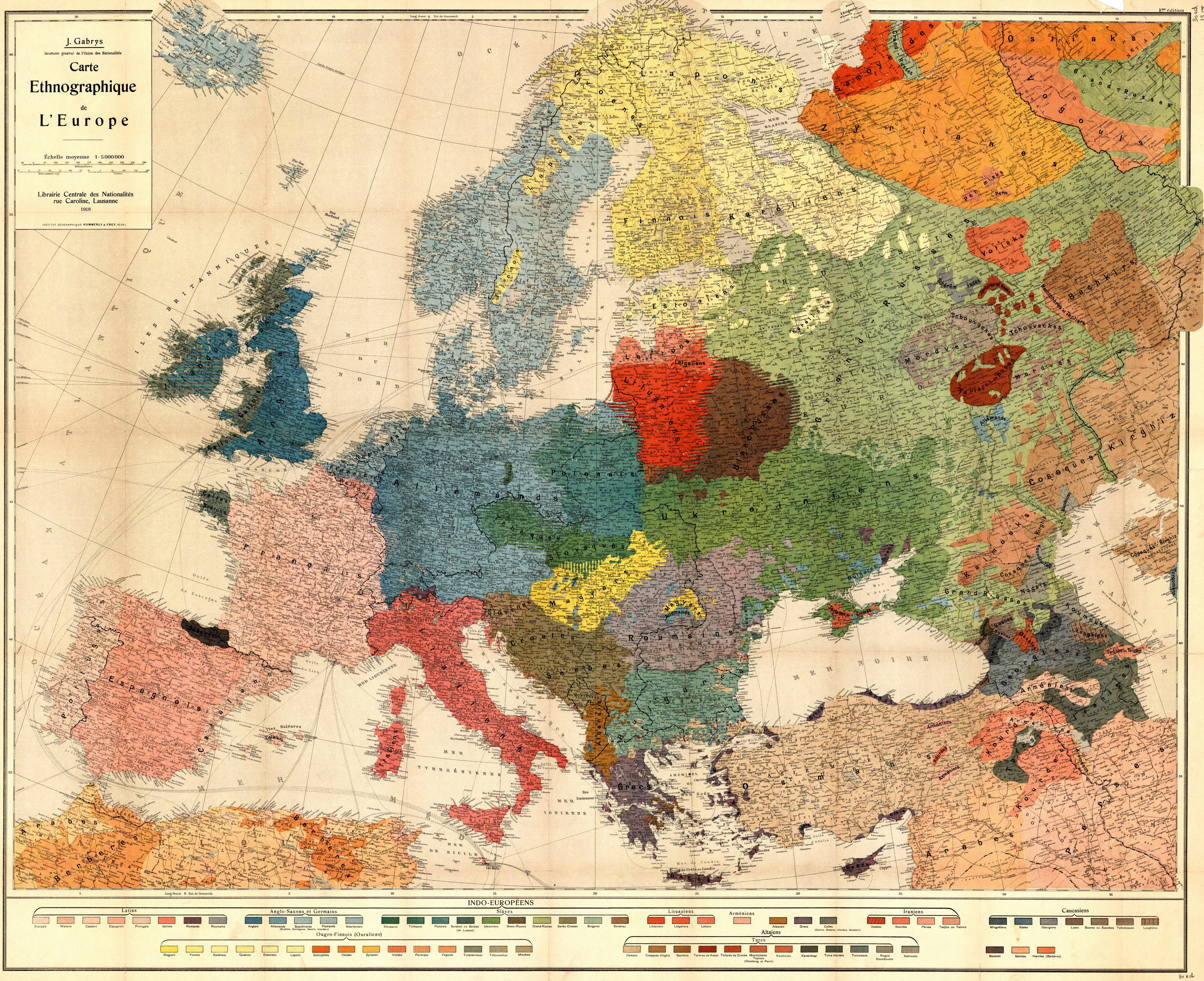
The map depicting the ethnicities of Europe in 1918, ranging from the Iberian Peninsula to the Ural Mountains

Gabrys's main goal was to visually demonstrate the maximum territorial expanse of the Lithuanian state in order to compel other countries to take its interests into account.

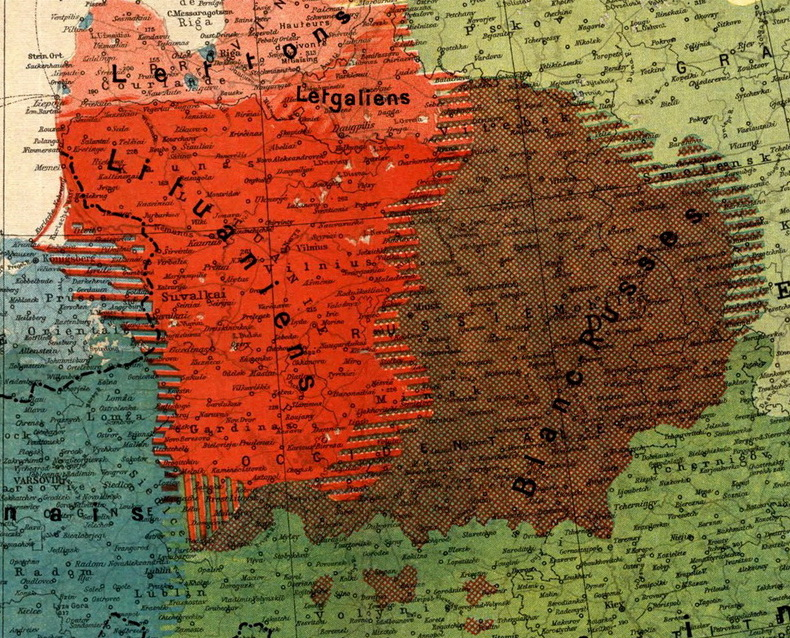
Areas of Lithuanians and Belarusians as depicted on Gabrys' map

When compiling the map, Gabrys used data from the 1897 Russian Empire census and a map by the German researcher Franz Tetzner; however, these sources were adapted to serve specific political goals.

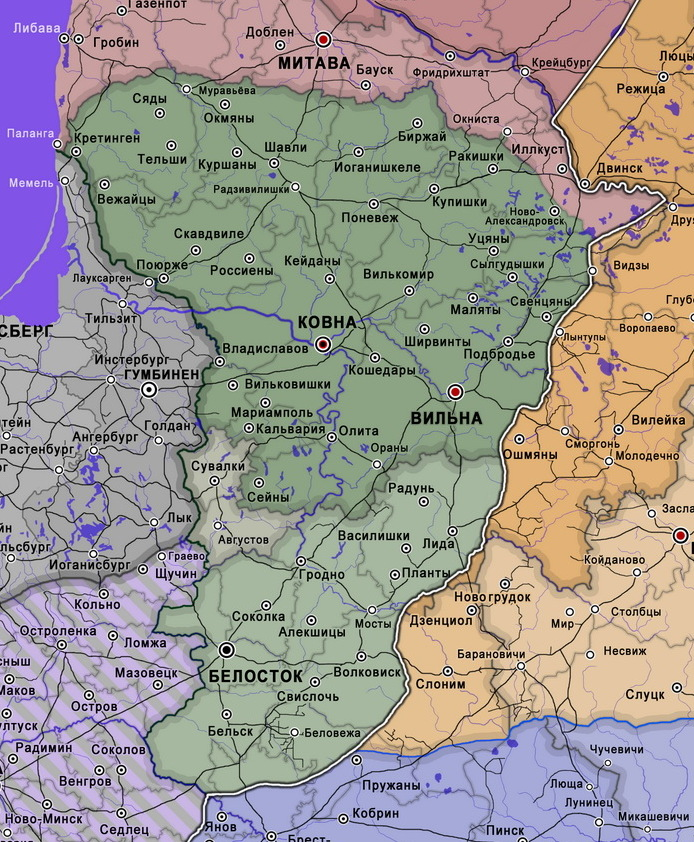
Map of the Military Administration of Lithuania as of June 11, 1918. The map shows the administrative division into "North" and "South" districts within the German occupation administration, which Gabrys's ethnographic map largely mirrored.

The main feature of the 1918 map was the absence of shading for mixed ethnic territories, a technique the author had still used in 1917. Ethnographic Lithuania was depicted in solid red, with minimal shading, and its borders included the entire Vilna Governorate along with the city of Vilnius (with the exception of the Dzisna and Vileyka uyezds), as well as most of the Grodno, Suwałki, and Minsk governorates. This area almost entirely coincided with the administrative boundaries of the German occupation zone of Ober Ost. Moreover, at the time the map was created, the Lithuanian standard language invented an artificially Lithuanised name—with no evidence of use in actual spoken Lithuanian—for the city of Brest, which was lay on the southern edge of Lithuanian territorial claims.

All geographical names within the boundaries of this defined Lithuania were presented in a dual format: the Lithuanian name was printed in bold, accompanied by its Russian or German equivalent. For the rest of Europe, only the local original names were used.

=== Polish and Belarusian opposition to Lithuanian claims ===
The map was actively distributed among Western diplomats, as between 1918 and 1919, it went through five editions, with only the cover color changing. The publication provoked categorical protests from Polish and Belarusian national figures, who disputed the territorial claims, because they themselves claimed that territory. Polish linguist Kazimierz Nitsch pointed out that Gabrys artificially doubled the Lithuanian ethnic territory compared to its actual extent, which negatively reflected on Polish interests on the international stage.

Belarusian nationalists of the Belarusian People's Republic criticized the map for ignoring the presence of the Slavic population. In October 1919, the Kaunas-based journal Chasopis Ministerstva belaruskikh sprau (edited by Jazep Varonka) published an indignant review titled "A False Map":

Кожны сьвядомы беларус павінен апратэставаць мапу нацыянальнасьцяў Эўропы, выданую „вядомым“ І. Габрысам у Лёзаньні у Швэйцарыі і ахвяраванную нікому іншаму, як самаму В. Вільсону. У гэтай мапе зусім фальшыва і лыгарскі паказана разсяленьне беларусоў, якіх з фантазыі „этнографа“ Габрыса німа ні у Городні, ні аж да Берэсьцья. На мапе гэтай стаіць, што у Городні, Саколцы, Беластоку, Бельску, Белавежы і т. д. жывуць літвіны(?).

[Every conscious Belarusian must protest against the map of the nationalities of Europe, published by the "famous" J. Gabrys in Lausanne, Switzerland, and dedicated to none other than W. Wilson himself. This map shows the settlement of Belarusians completely falsely and deceitfully, who, according to the fantasy of the "ethnographer" Gabrys, are not present in Grodno, nor all the way to Brest. The map states that Lithuanians (!?) live in Grodno, Sokółka, Białystok, Bielsk, Białowieża, etc.]

— «Часопісь», No. 2, October 1919

== Bibliography ==
- Nenartovič, Tomaš (2016). Kaiserlich-russische, deutsche, polnische, litauische, belarussische und sowjetische kartographische Vorstellungen und territoriale Projekte zur Kontaktregion von Wilna 1795-1939 [Imperial Russian, German, Polish, Lithuanian, Belarusian and Soviet cartographic concepts and territorial projects for the contact region of Vilna 1795-1939] (PDF) (in German). München: Collegium Carolinum. p. 738.
