= Ethnographic Lithuania =

Concept of Lithuanian territory

Coordinates: 55°N 24°E

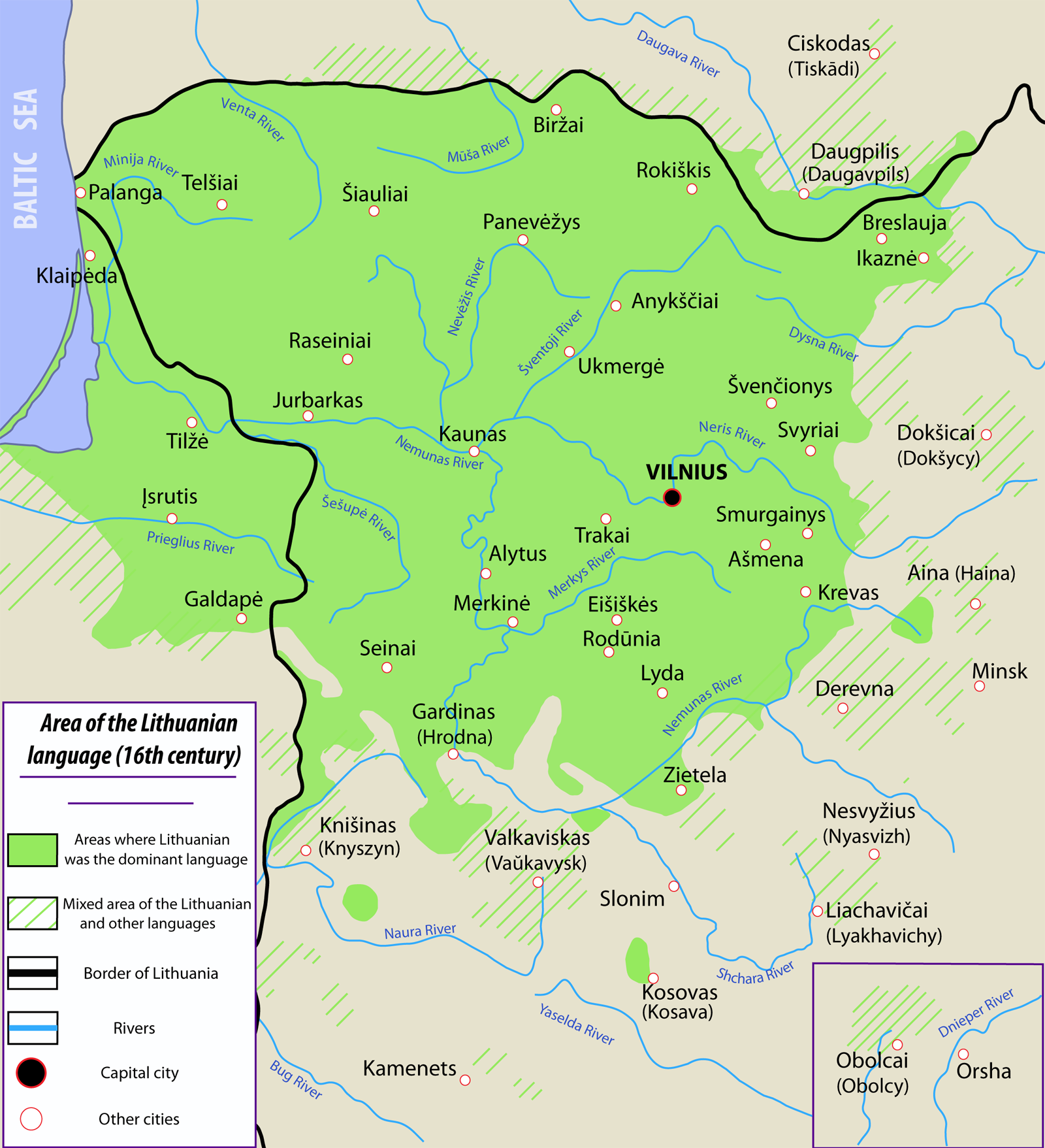
Map depicting the extent of the Lithuanian language in the 16th-century (according to professor Zigmas Zinkevičius)

Ethnographic Lithuania is a concept that defines Lithuanian territories as a significant part of the territories that belonged to the Grand Duchy of Lithuania and Lithuanians as all people living on them, regardless of whether those people contemporarily or currently speak the Lithuanian language and considered themselves Lithuanian. The concept was in contrast to those of "historic Lithuania", the territories of the Duchy, and the "linguistic Lithuania", the area where Lithuanian language was overwhelmingly spoken.

The many Roman Catholic churches where the priests had to know the Lithuanian language according to the letter of the Grand Duke of Lithuania Alexander Jagiellon, 1501

== History ==
In the early 20th century, the concept of "ethnographic Lithuania" became a central element of the Lithuanian national movement and its territorial claims. This concept was heavily influenced by the rising prominence of ethnography and anthropogeography as scientific disciplines, which were often utilized to justify political and territorial ambitions in Eastern Europe.

The geographical scope of ethnographic Lithuania was noted in 1905, the year of Great Seimas of Vilnius, when Russian prime minister Sergei Witte received the following memorial:

"Lithuanians, knowing that territory inhabited by them since the historical times consists of the Lithuanian gubernyas of the Northwestern Krai: Vilna Governorate, Kovno Governorate and Grodno Governorate, part of Courland and Suwałki Governorate (incorporated into the Kingdom of Poland), consider them in the ethnographic perspective Lithuanian, and their inhabitants living there alongside the Lithuanians as either newcomers - such as Poles, Jews and Russians - or slavicized Lithuanians, such as Belarusians."

The concept of "ethnographic Lithuania" often overlapped with the boundaries of the former Grand Duchy of Lithuania or the historical Lithuania Proper, encompassing regions such as the Vilna Governorate, parts of Grodno Governorate, and Suwałki Governorate. Lithuanian cartographers and intellectuals, such as Petras Klimas and Juozas Gabrys, actively promoted this maximalist territorial vision, especially during and after World War I, aiming to secure international recognition for a large Lithuanian state.

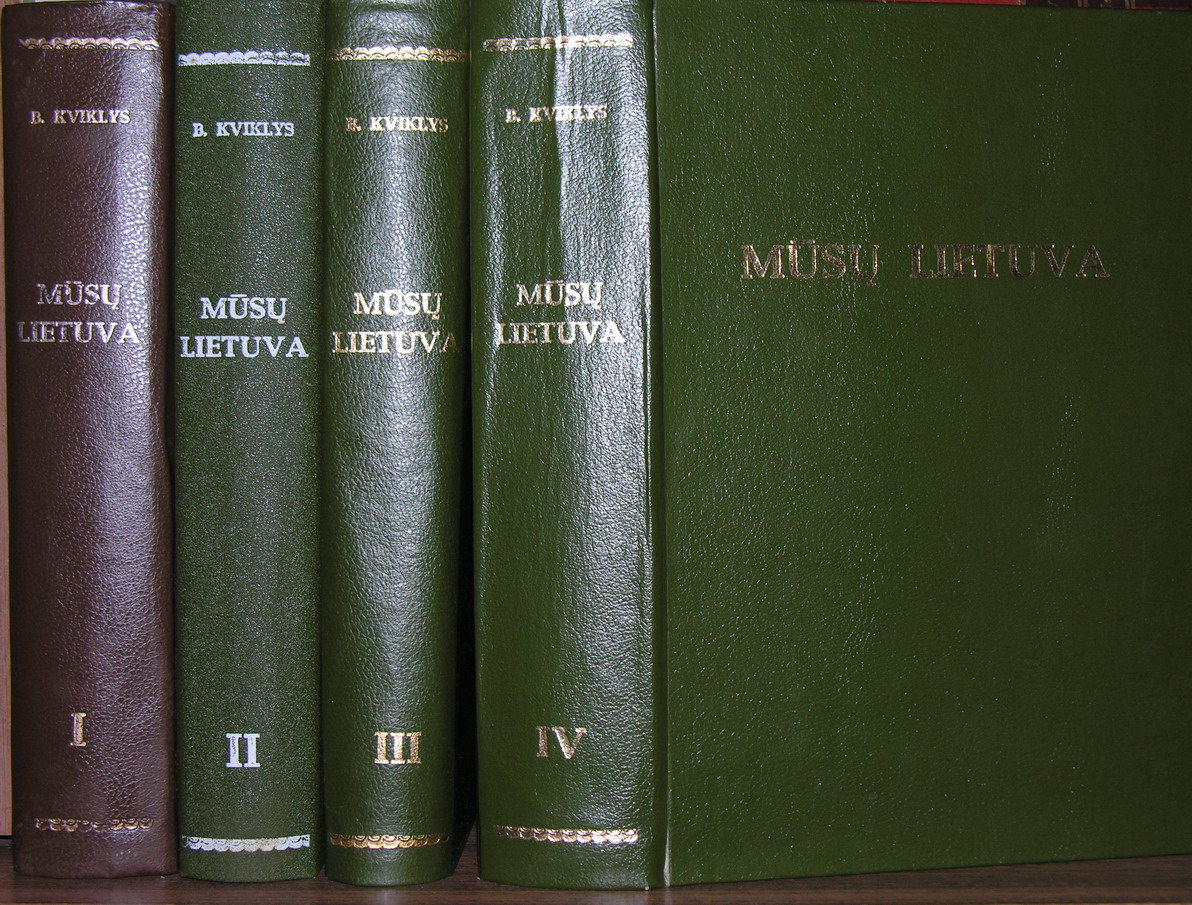
"Our Lithuania" 1964-1968 (1989-1991 editions pictured) by Bronius Kviklys. The books are encyclopedia volumes containing information about historical Lithuanian cities, towns and villages both within and outside the modern-day borders of Lithuania.

According to the interpretation of Polish historian Piotr Lossowski, the concept of ethnographic Lithuania clashed with the right for self-determination of people living in that large territory, particularly Poles and Belarusians, who, according to the supporters of the ethnographic Lithuania, were "slavicized Lithuanians" who needed to be re-Lithuanized. They argued that an individual cannot choose his ethnicity and nationality, which are determined not by language but by ancestry. In 1920, Lithuanian politician Mykolas Biržiška wrote about nationality:

"One cannot define it according to the opinion of every individual. Belonging or not to a given nationality is not something everybody can decide for themselves, it is not something that can be solved according to political liberalism, even if hidden under the cloak of democratic slogans. It is too complex, too tied with ancient history, too related with the history of a given nation, for the will or passivity of any individual to challenge it. [...] Ethnographic Lithuania does not end where the locals no longer speak Lithuanian, it spreads further, to the regions which do not speak - but used to - Lithuanian, since it is composed of one Lithuanian nation, regardless of whether it speaks Lithuanian, has forgotten the language or even holds it in contempt."

According to the interpretations of Polish historian, demands of this early program would only slightly be modified in the coming decades (some would also include part of the Minsk Governorate around Navahrudak and the Lithuanian Minor territory around Memel). In essence, Lithuanian elites demanded the creation of a Lithuanian country with 125,000 square miles (320,000 km^{2}), from the Baltic Sea in the West, Daugava River in the north, to Bug River and Polesie marshes in the south. That territory was inhabited in the early 20th century by 5,850,000 people; out of those, according to the official Russian Empire statistics, linguistic Lithuanians formed 1,659,000 - i.e. less than 30%. Out of the regions mentioned in the 1905 declaration, only the Kovno Governorate and the northern part of Suwałki Governorate had a clear Lithuanian-speaking majority.

The concept of ethnographic Lithuania conflicted with the newly established Polish state, which sought to create a national Polish state on the territory of the former Polish-Lithuanian Commonwealth. The Vilnius region, claimed by both nations, became a major point of contention. While Polish cartographers like Eugeniusz Romer and Kazimierz Nitsch emphasized the Polish character of the region based on language and religion, Lithuanian cartographers argued for its inclusion in "ethnographic Lithuania" based on historical and "racial" arguments, often portraying the local Slavic-speaking populations as "polonized" or "slavicized" Lithuanians.

Currently, the Republic of Lithuania has no territorial claims.

== Cartographic representation ==
Cartography played a crucial role in visualizing and promoting the idea of "ethnographic Lithuania." Maps were not merely scientific documents but powerful political tools.

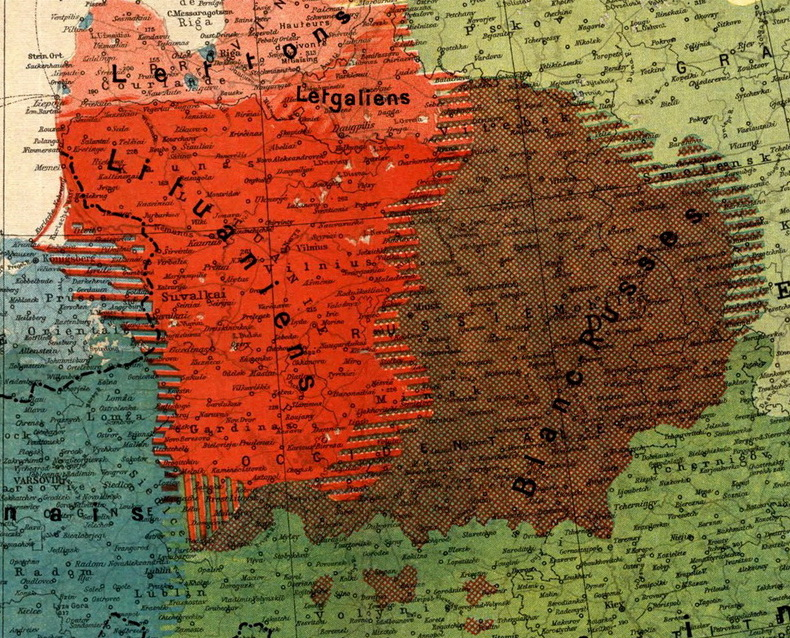
Tendentiously delineated settlement areas of Lithuanians and Belarusians on Gabrys's "Ethnographic Map of Europe" (1918)

One of the earliest and most influential examples of this cartographic propaganda was the Carte ethnographique de l'Europe (Ethnographic Map of Europe) published by Juozas Gabrys in Lausanne in 1918. This map depicted "ethnographic Lithuania" as a massive, monolithic red bloc, encompassing the entire Vilnius region and extending far into Belarusian and Polish territories. It deliberately ignored the ethnic complexity of the region, identifying language with nationality and omitting areas of mixed population, to present a compelling visual argument to Western diplomats at the Paris Peace Conference.

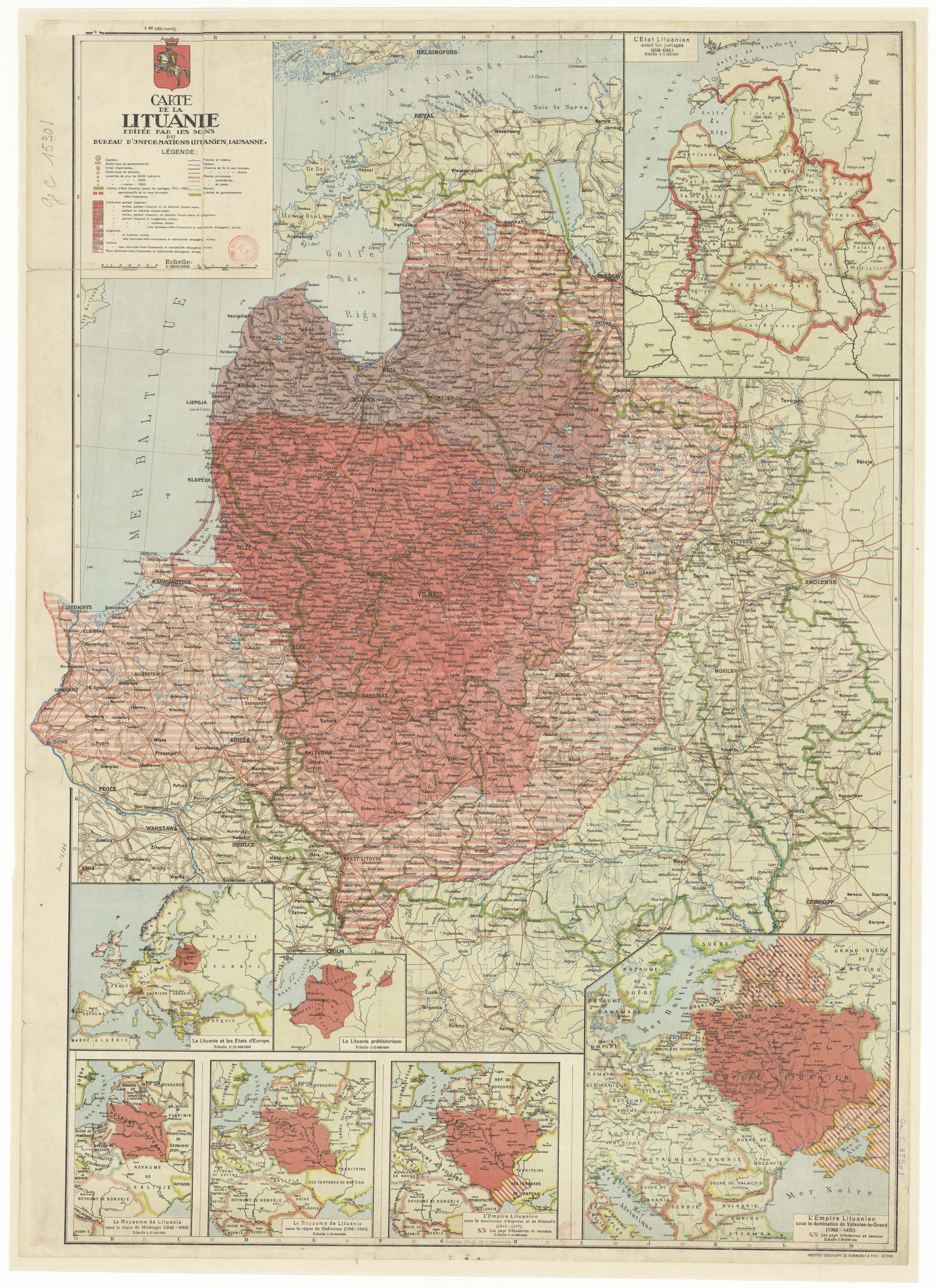
A 1918 map titled "Carte de la Lituanie", published by the Lithuanian Information Bureau in Lausanne. It was a key piece of cartographic propaganda used during the Paris Peace Conference to justify maximalist territorial claims by presenting an idealized image of "ethnographic Lithuania."

Similarly, the Carte de la Lituanie (Map of Lithuania), published in Bern in 1918 by the Lithuanian Information Bureau (with involvement from Gabrys and Vladas Daumantas), used visual manipulation to exaggerate the extent of Lithuanian territory. It highlighted the borders of "prehistoric Lithuania" with a wide pink hatching that covered large parts of East Prussia and Belarus, creating the illusion of a vast Lithuanian demographic presence that far exceeded linguistic realities.

These maps provoked strong reactions from Polish and Belarusian intellectuals. Polish linguist Kazimierz Nitsch criticized Gabrys for artificially doubling the size of the Lithuanian ethnic territory, while Belarusian figures in the Kaunas-based journal Časopis condemned his map as "completely false and deceitful" for ignoring the Belarusian population in the Grodno and Brest regions.

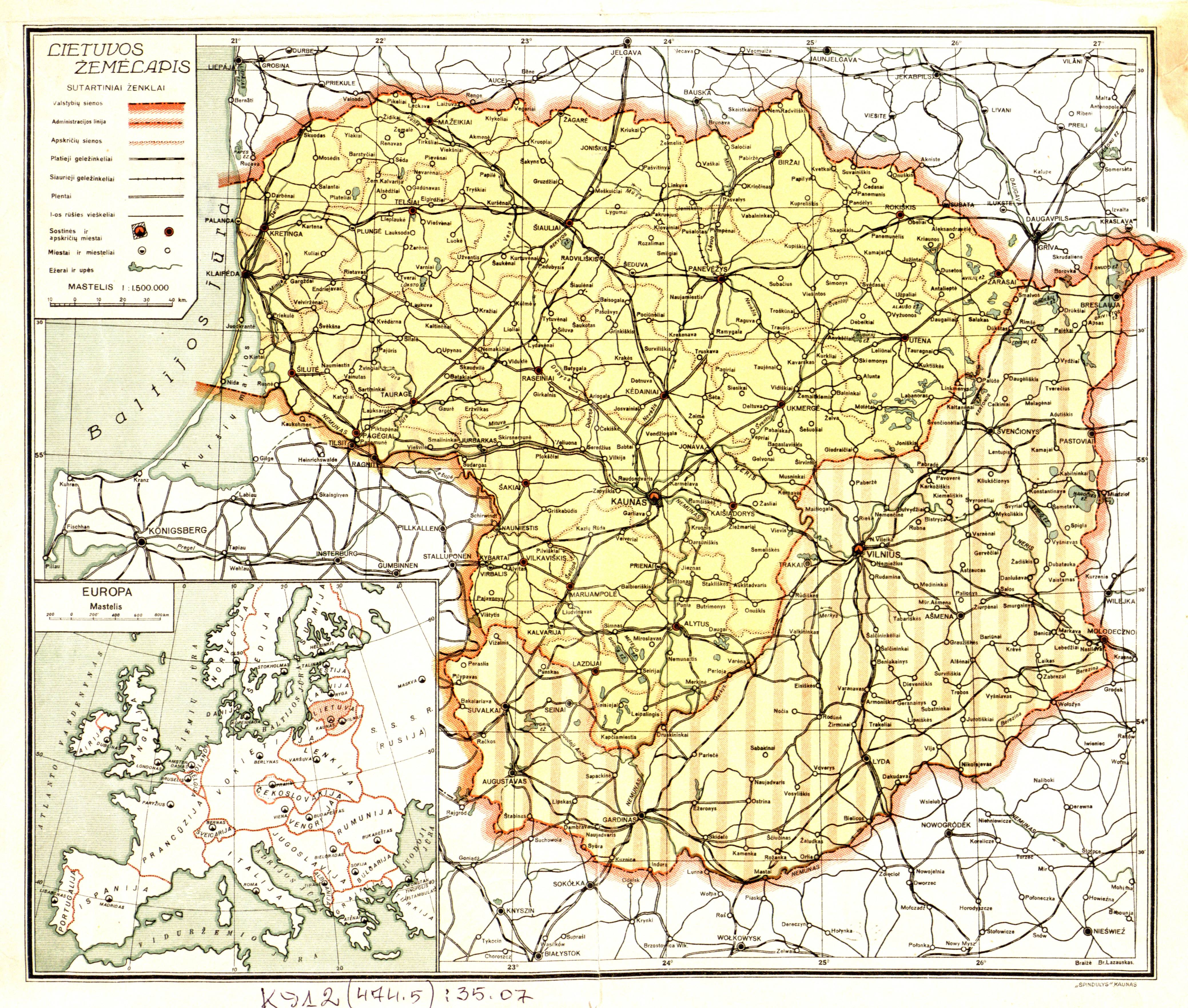
Lithuania's territorial claims during the Interbellum.

Throughout the interwar period, Lithuanian cartographers, such as those at the University of Kaunas (e.g., Kazys Pakštas), continued to produce maps that often reflected the borders established by the Soviet–Lithuanian Peace Treaty of 1920, which included Vilnius, rather than the actual de facto borders. This cartographic practice served to maintain the claim to the Vilnius region and reinforce the concept of "ethnographic Lithuania" in the national consciousness.

== See also ==
- Krajowcy
- List of irredentist claims or disputes
- Lithuania proper
- Lithuanian National Revival
- Lithuanization
- Polonization
- Russification
- Regions of Lithuania
- Tutejszy
- Miedzymorze
