= Juozas Gabrys =

Lithuanian politician and diplomat

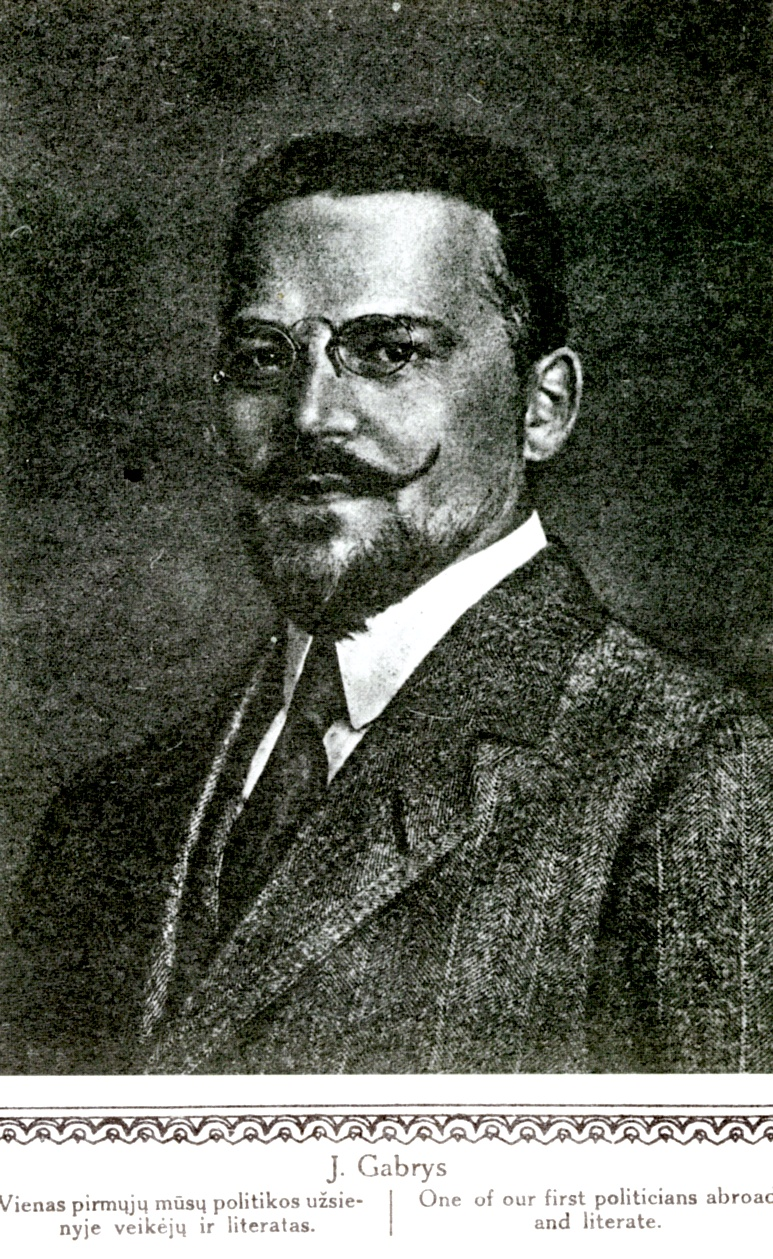
- Gabrys in 1921
- Born: February 22, 1880; Garliava, Suwałki Governorate, Russian Empire
- Died: July 26, 1951 (aged 71); Corsier-sur-Vevey, Switzerland
- Other names: Count of Garliava, Juozas Gabrys-Paršaitis, Iosif Parshaitis
- Education: University of Odessa
- Occupations: Politician, diplomat, lawyer, journalist
- Known for: Advocating Lithuanian independence, ethnographic cartography
- Political party: Lithuanian Democratic Party

Juozas Gabrys or Juozas Gabrys-Paršaitis (used pseudonyms Inorodetz, Kareivis, C. Rivas; February 22, 1880 – July 26, 1951) was a Lithuanian politician, diplomat, lawyer, journalist, and public figure. He is best remembered for his efforts to popularize the idea of Lithuania's independence in the West during World War I. As the publisher of several ethnographic maps, he played a significant role in the propagandistic justification of the maximum borders of the Lithuanian state on the international stage.

== Early life ==
Juozas Gabrys was born on February 22, 1880, in the town of Garliava, near the city of Kaunas, Lithuania. He went to the Garliava primary school starting at the age of seven. He graduated with a law degree from the University of Odessa in 1907.

== Biography ==
During the 1905 Russian Revolution, Gabrys served as a secretary of the Great Seimas of Vilnius. In October 1905, he organized an armed unit in Suvalkija to close Russian schools and fight the police. During a clash with a larger Russian police detachment on the banks of the Šešupė river, Gabrys was severely wounded in the head and right arm. He was saved from the gendarmes by local peasants (Strimaitis and the Baltusiai brothers), who were later exiled to Siberia for ten years.

He went into exile in 1907 to Paris. There, in 1911, he founded the Lithuanian Information Bureau. To impress French society and gain influence, he began calling himself the "Count of Garliava" (Comte de Garlawa). In 1912, he founded the Union des Nationalités. These two organizations supplied European powers with information on Lithuania and other exploited European countries that crusaded for human rights and freedom.

In 1915, Gabrys moved from Paris to Lausanne, Switzerland. He started a campaign of political activities and held the first Lithuanian conferences during World War I to obtain freedom for Lithuania. During this period, Gabrys was recruited by the German Foreign Ministry (Auswärtiges Amt) and became a key figure in the "League of Foreign Peoples of Russia" (Liga der Fremdvölker Russlands), an organization created with German support to weaken the Russian Empire by backing national movements. Although he acted as an instrument of German propaganda, Gabrys sought to exploit this situation for the benefit of Lithuanian independence.

His campaigns were financed by Lithuanian immigrants of the United States and the German Foreign Ministry. He published articles in more than fifty European newspapers for his campaigns, sometimes bribing editors to get them through. His greatest success in organization was the Congress of Nationalities held in Switzerland in 1916 with 400 representatives from 23 nationalities.

According to Alfred E. Senn, "Gabrys was undoubtedly the best known Lithuanian political figure on the European scene before 1916." During World War I, Gabrys hoped to secure independence for Lithuania. He communicated the cruel treatment the Lithuanians were receiving from the German military when they were occupying Lithuania to the French authorities. He also called upon the Allies of World War I for assisting against German occupation. Gabrys involved the Vatican in a worldwide collection of millions of Swiss francs for Lithuanian victims of war, which ultimately ended up in his personal bank accounts.

=== Cartographic and propaganda work ===
A special role in Gabrys's activities was played by the publication of geographical and ethnographic maps, which he viewed as a powerful political tool to promote Lithuanian interests at international peace conferences.

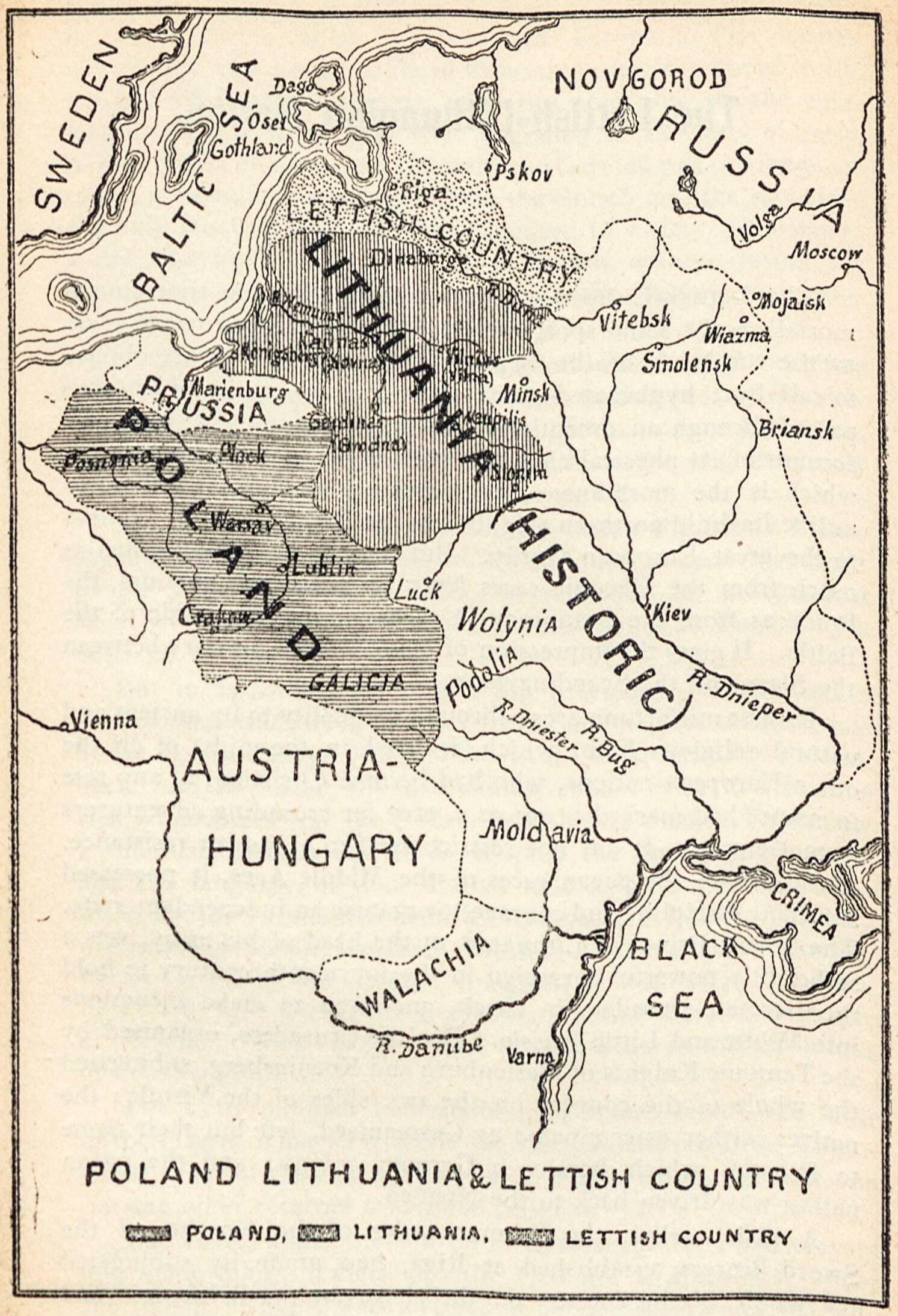
The English-language map "Poland, Lithuania & Lettisch Country", published in Gabrys's 1915 book Lithuania and the autonomy of Poland.

In 1915, he published the English-language map "Poland, Lithuania & Lettisch Country" as an appendix to his book in Paris, depicting Lithuania within the broad historical borders of the former Grand Duchy of Lithuania.

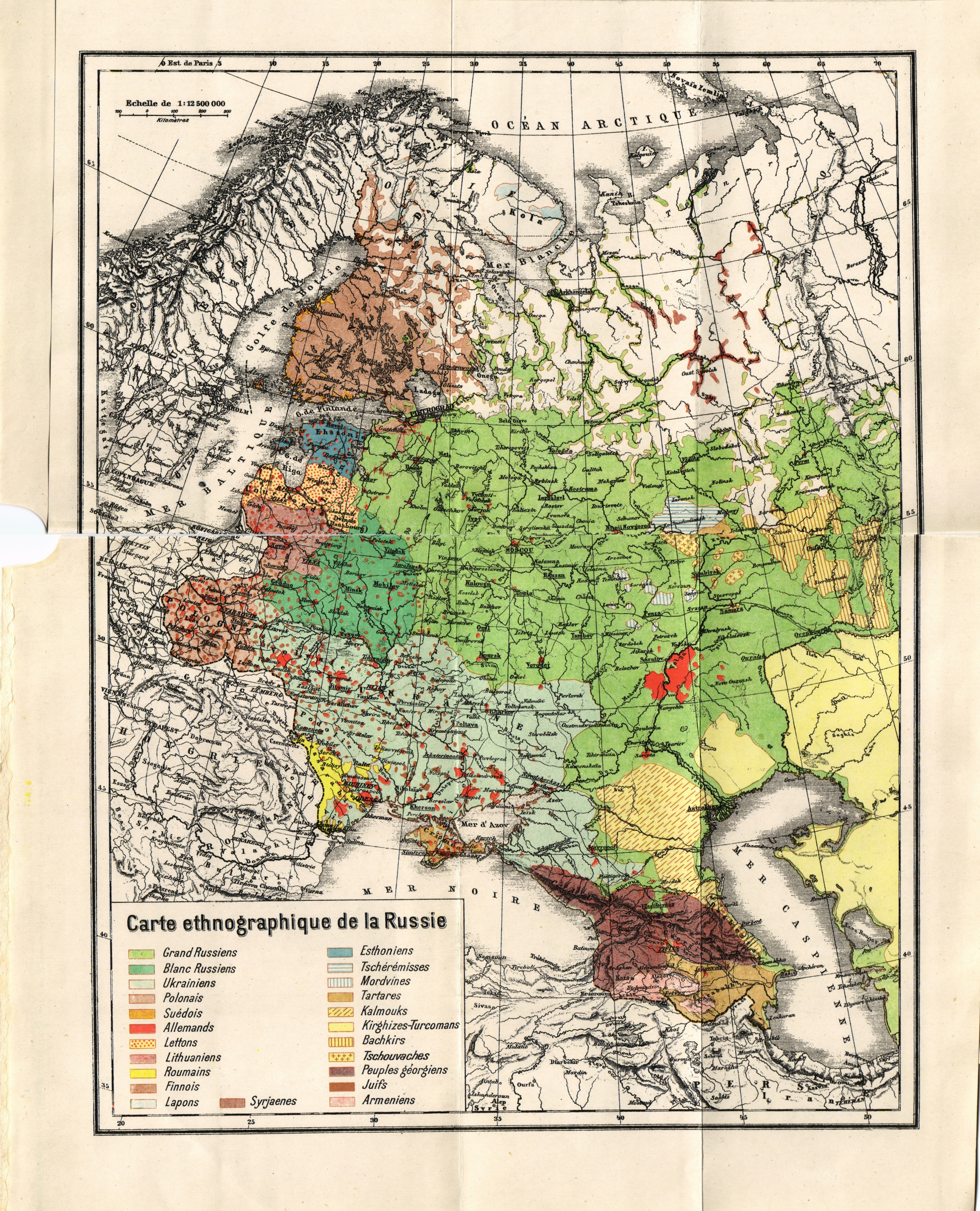
The French version of the "Ethnographic Map of Russia", published by Gabrys in La Russie et les peuples allogènes (Bern, 1917).

Between 1916 and 1918, working within the "League of Foreign Peoples of Russia", Gabrys published the "Ethnographic Map of Russia" (German: Völkerkarte von Russland, French: Carte ethnographique de la Russie) under the pseudonym Inorodetz. Created for anti-Russian propaganda to highlight the empire's diverse ethnic makeup, the map largely copied the 1875 work of Russian cartographer Aleksandr Rittich regarding the Vilna region. The territory around Vilna was colored green to denote a Belarusian settlement area (Blanc Russiens), with Lithuanian, Jewish, and German enclaves added as dotted areas.

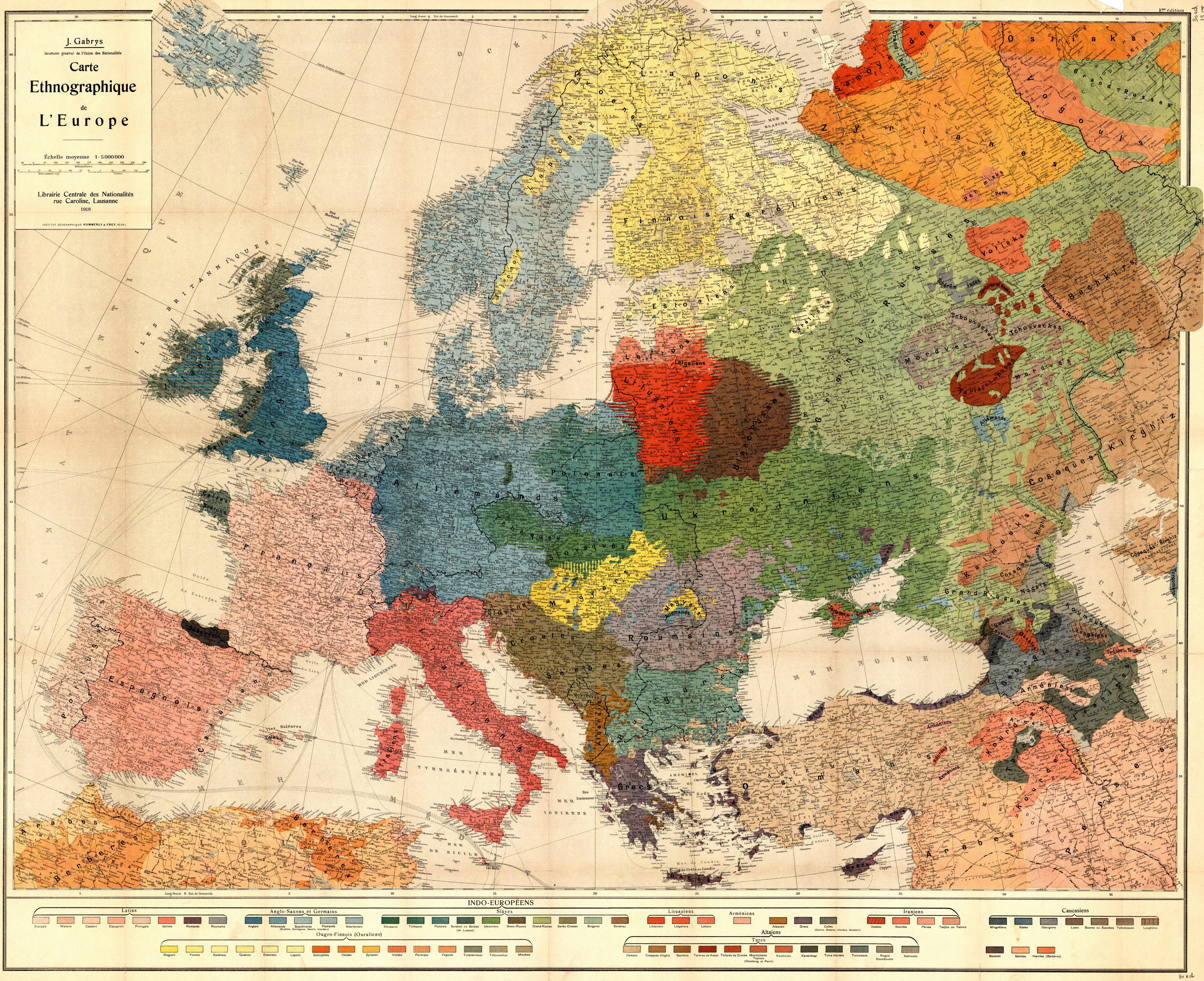
The "Ethnographic Map of Europe", published by Gabrys in 1918.

In 1918, Gabrys published his most famous work, the "Ethnographic Map of Europe" (Carte ethnographique de l'Europe) in Lausanne. Dedicated to US President Woodrow Wilson, it equated language with nationality and deliberately omitted ethnically mixed areas in the east. "Ethnographic Lithuania" was depicted as a monolithic space encompassing the entire Vilna Governorate (including Vilnius, but excluding the Dzisna and Vileyka uyezds), as well as significant parts of the Grodno, Suwałki, and Minsk governorates.

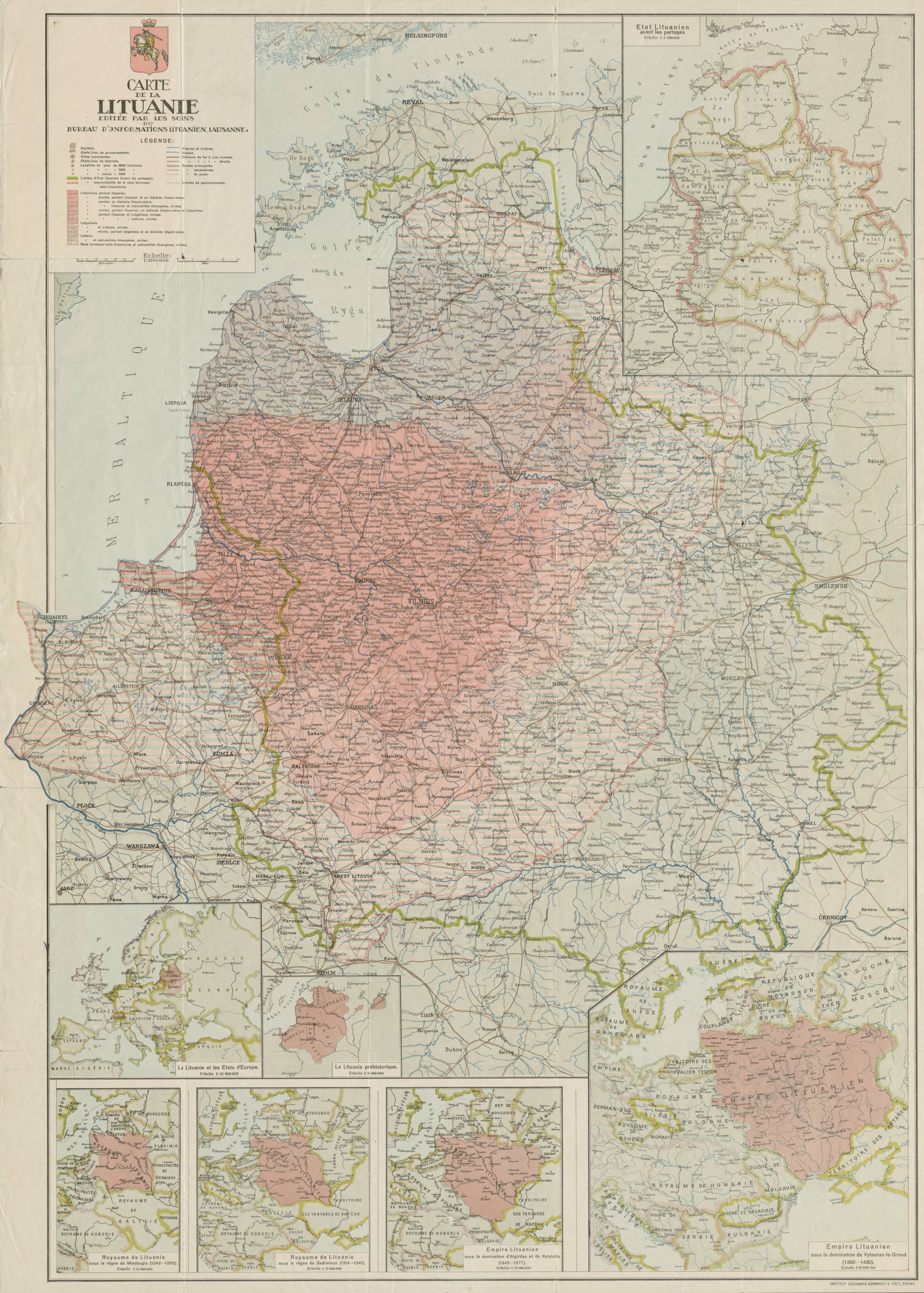
The "Map of Lithuania", published by Gabrys in 1918.

He also contributed to the "Map of Lithuania" (Carte de la Lituanie), published in Bern in 1918 alongside Lithuanian diplomat Vladas Daumantas. Researchers have noted the use of visual manipulation in this map: "prehistoric Lithuania" was marked with broad pink hatching that covered vast territories, including parts of East Prussia and Belarus up to the Bug River. The subtle shading differences created an illusion for uninformed viewers of a massive, monolithic modern Lithuanian nation, far exceeding actual ethnographic borders, designed to emotionally influence Western politicians.

=== Criticism of the maps ===
Gabrys's cartographic manipulations drew sharp criticism. Polish linguist Kazimierz Nitsch pointed out that Gabrys artificially doubled the Lithuanian ethnic territory compared to reality, which damaged Polish interests on the international stage. The Belarusian national movement also strongly criticized his maps for ignoring the Belarusian population. In October 1919, the Kaunas-based journal Chasopis Ministerstva belaruskikh sprau (edited by Yazep Varonka) published an indignant review titled "A False Map":

Кожны сьвядомы беларус павінен апратэставаць мапу нацыянальнасьцяў Эўропы, выданую „вядомым“ І. Габрысам у Лёзаньні у Швэйцарыі і ахвяраванную нікому іншаму, як самаму В. Вільсону. У гэтай мапе зусім фальшыва і лыгарскі паказана разсяленьне беларусоў, якіх з фантазыі „этнографа“ Габрыса німа ні у Городні, ні аж да Берэсьцья. На мапе гэтай стаіць, што у Городні, Саколцы, Беластоку, Бельску, Белавежы і т. д. жывуць літвіны(?).

[Every conscious Belarusian must protest against the map of the nationalities of Europe, published by the "famous" J. Gabrys in Lausanne, Switzerland, and dedicated to none other than W. Wilson himself. This map shows the settlement of Belarusians completely falsely and deceitfully, who, according to the fantasy of the "ethnographer" Gabrys, are not present in Grodno, nor all the way to Brest. The map states that Lithuanians (!?) live in Grodno, Sokółka, Białystok, Bielsk, Białowieża, etc.]

— «Часопісь», No. 2, October 1919

== Later life ==
Suspicions regarding his cooperation with German and French intelligence damaged his relations with the Council of Lithuania (Taryba). In November 1917, at the Lithuanian conference in Bern, his activities were restricted. During the Paris Peace Conference in 1919, Gabrys attended as a representative of his own Swiss-Lithuanian organization, rather than as part of the official Lithuanian delegation.

When the new Lithuanian government started at the end of 1918, Gabrys was not a political participant because of his disagreements with the government officials. Because of his German government contacts during World War I, he ultimately "became virtually an unperson" in Lithuanian history despite his efforts to liberate the country.

In 1919, with the help of the French, Gabrys unsuccessfully attempted to get a Lithuanian government position. From that point on, he dabbled in Lithuanian politics until he retired. In retirement, he became a gentleman-farmer in Switzerland. Gabrys died on 26 July 1951 at Corsier-sur-Vevey in Switzerland.

== Works ==
Gabrys is the only leading Lithuanian liberation political advocate during World War I to write his memoirs in a Western language. His works include:

- Gabrys, Juozas (1911). La nation lithuanienne; son état sous la domination russe et allemande (in French). Paris: Imprimerie de la Cour d'Appel.
- Gabrys, Juozas (1918). Carte Ethnographique de l'Europe 1918 (in French). Lausanne: Institut geographique Kummerly and Fray.
- Gabrys-Paršaitis, Juozas (2007). Tautos sargyboj. Egzodo archyvas (in Lithuanian). Vilnius: Versus aureus. ISBN 978-9955699545.
- Demm, Eberhard; Nikolajew, Christina; Chamba, Nathalie (2013). Auf Wache für die Nation: Erinnerungen : der Weltkriegsagent Juozas Gabrys berichtet (1911-1918) (in German). ISBN 9783653031485.

== Bibliography ==
- Kapochunas, Andrew (2018). "The Maps and Mapmakers that Helped Define 20th-Century Lithuanian Boundaries - Part 5". Journal of the Lithuania Philatelic Society (246): 16–29.
- Nenartovič, Tomaš (2016). Kaiserlich-russische, deutsche, polnische, litauische, belarussische und sowjetische kartographische Vorstellungen und territoriale Projekte zur Kontaktregion von Wilna 1795-1939 [Imperial Russian, German, Polish, Lithuanian, Belarusian and Soviet cartographic concepts and territorial projects for the contact region of Vilna 1795-1939] (PDF) (in German). München: Collegium Carolinum. p. 738.
- Senn, Alfred Erich (1980). Jonas Basanavičius: The Patriarch of the Lithuanian National Renaissance. East European Biography Series. Newtonville, Mass: Oriental Research Papers. p. 53. ISBN 0-89250-251-7.
- Smele, Jonathan (2006). The Russian Revolution and Civil War 1917-1921: An Annotated Bibliography. Bloomsbury Publishing. ISBN 978-1-4411-1992-6.
- Tucker, Spencer C.; Roberts, Priscilla Mary (2005). The Encyclopedia of World War I: A Political, Social, and Military History. ABC-CLIO. ISBN 978-1-85109-420-2.
