= Garliava =

- City
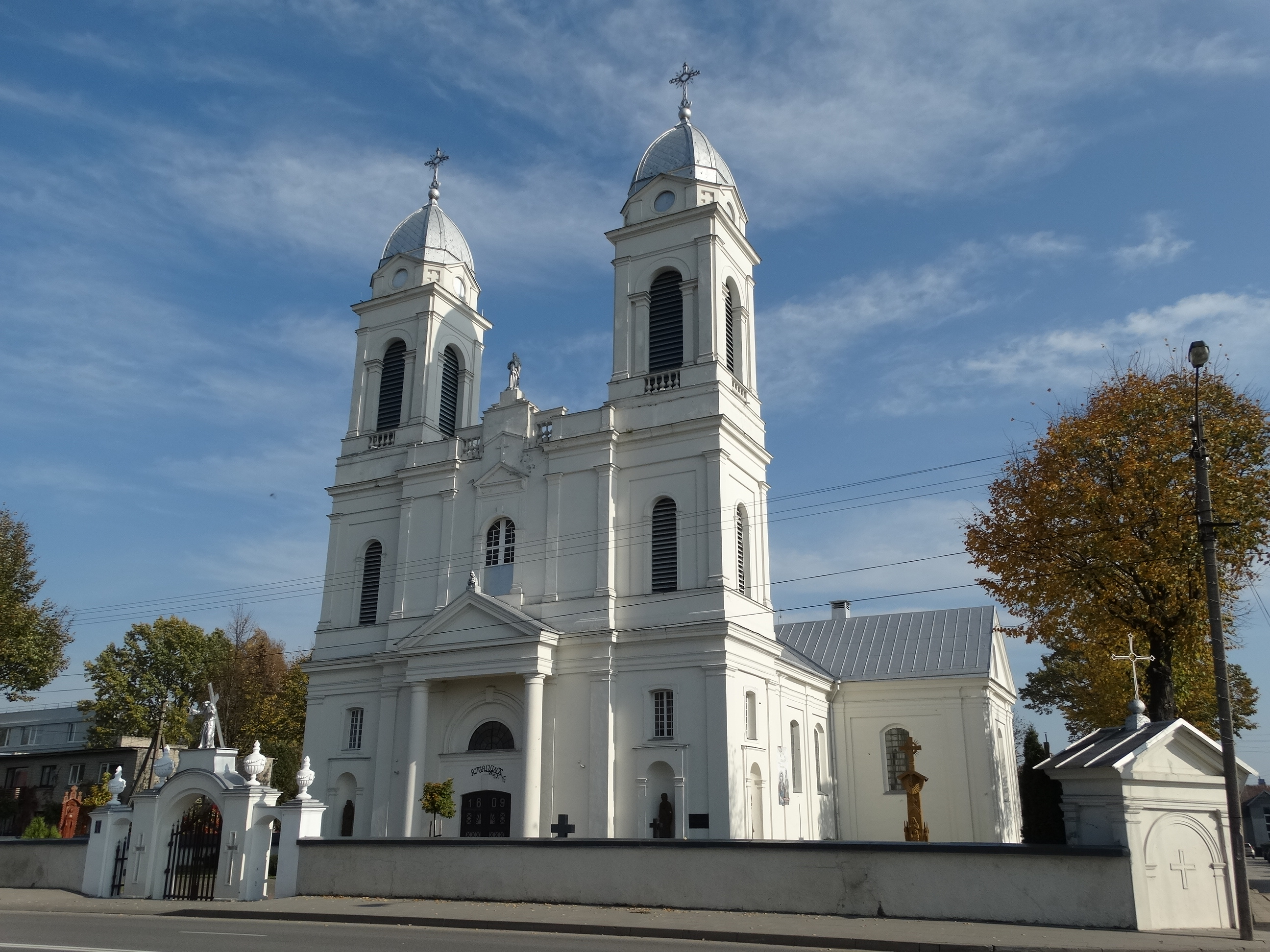
- Church of Holy Trinity in Garliava

- Coat of arms

- Location of Garliava
- Coordinates: 54°49′0″N 23°52′0″E
- Country: Lithuania
- Ethnographic region: Suvalkija
- County: Kaunas County
- Municipality: Kaunas district municipality
- Eldership: Garliava eldership
- Capital of: Garliava eldership Garliava rural eldership
- First mentioned: 1809
- Granted city rights: 1958
- Founder: Józef Godlewski
- Named for: Józef Godlewski

Population (2022)
  - Total: 10,234
- Time zone: UTC+2 (EET)
  - Summer (DST): UTC+3 (EEST)

Garliava, is a city in Kaunas District Municipality, Lithuania. Garliava is located 10 km (6.2 mi) south from the center of Kaunas and has a territory of 3,65 km^{2}.

== Name ==
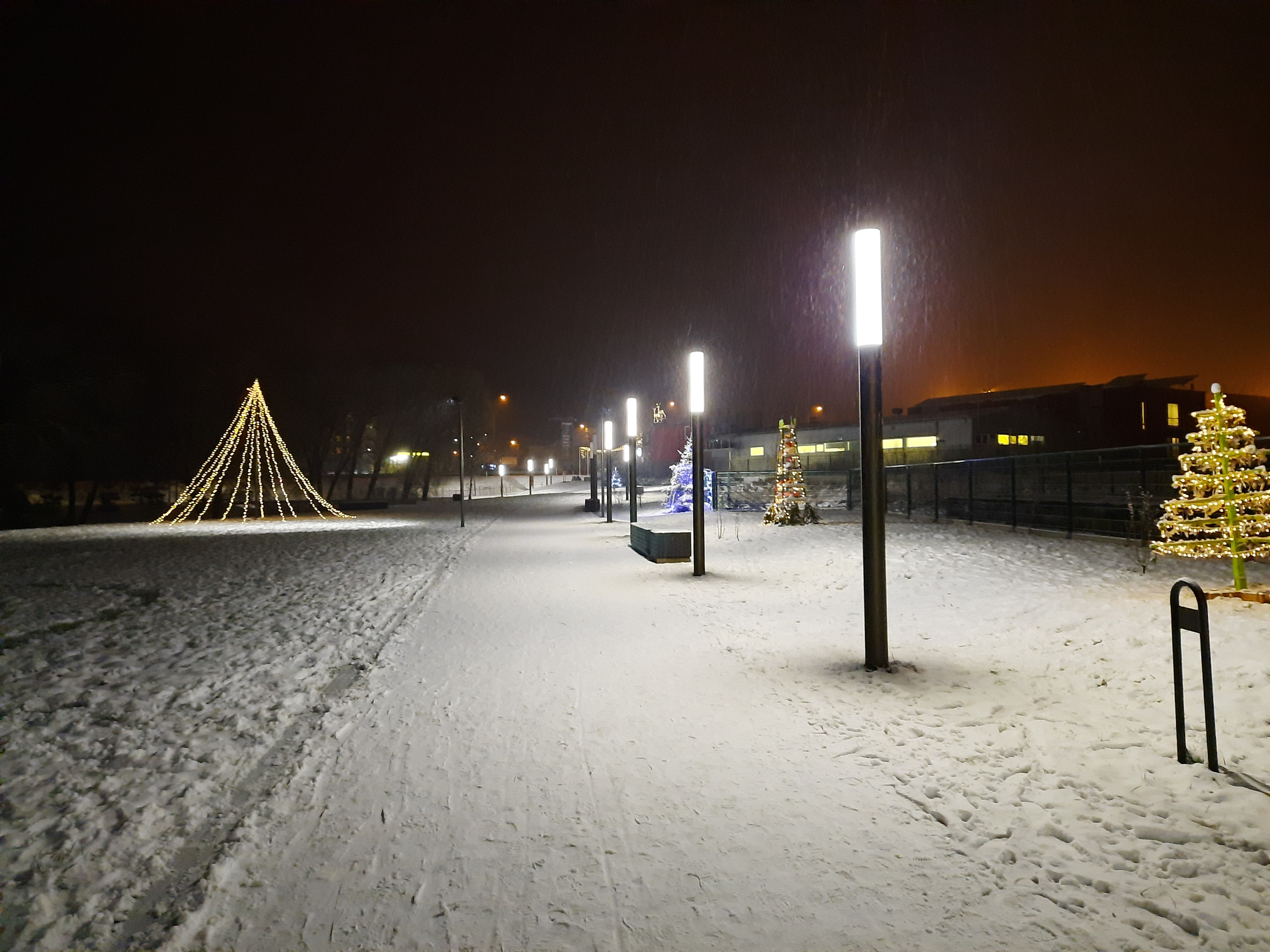
Park near the Maišys stream

Garliava is the Lithuanian name of the city. Versions of the name in other languages include Polish: Godlewo, Russian: Годлево Godlevo, Belarusian: Гадле́ва Gadleva, Yiddish: גודלעווע Gudleve, Latvian: Garļava.

== History ==
In 1809 Józef Godlewski built a Holy Trinity church and named the settlement Godlewo in his own honour, although Lithuanians started calling it Garliava. This year is generally viewed as the year Garliava was founded. It lay along a significant postal route between Saint Petersburg, Kaunas, Marijampolė, and Warsaw. Godlewski also built a place of worship for Lutherans and a synagogue for Jews. At the time, it was part of the short-lived Napoleonic Duchy of Warsaw, and after its dissolution in 1815, it became part of the so-called Congress Poland in Russian Empire. After World War I, it became part of the newly restored Lithuania.

== Notable residents ==
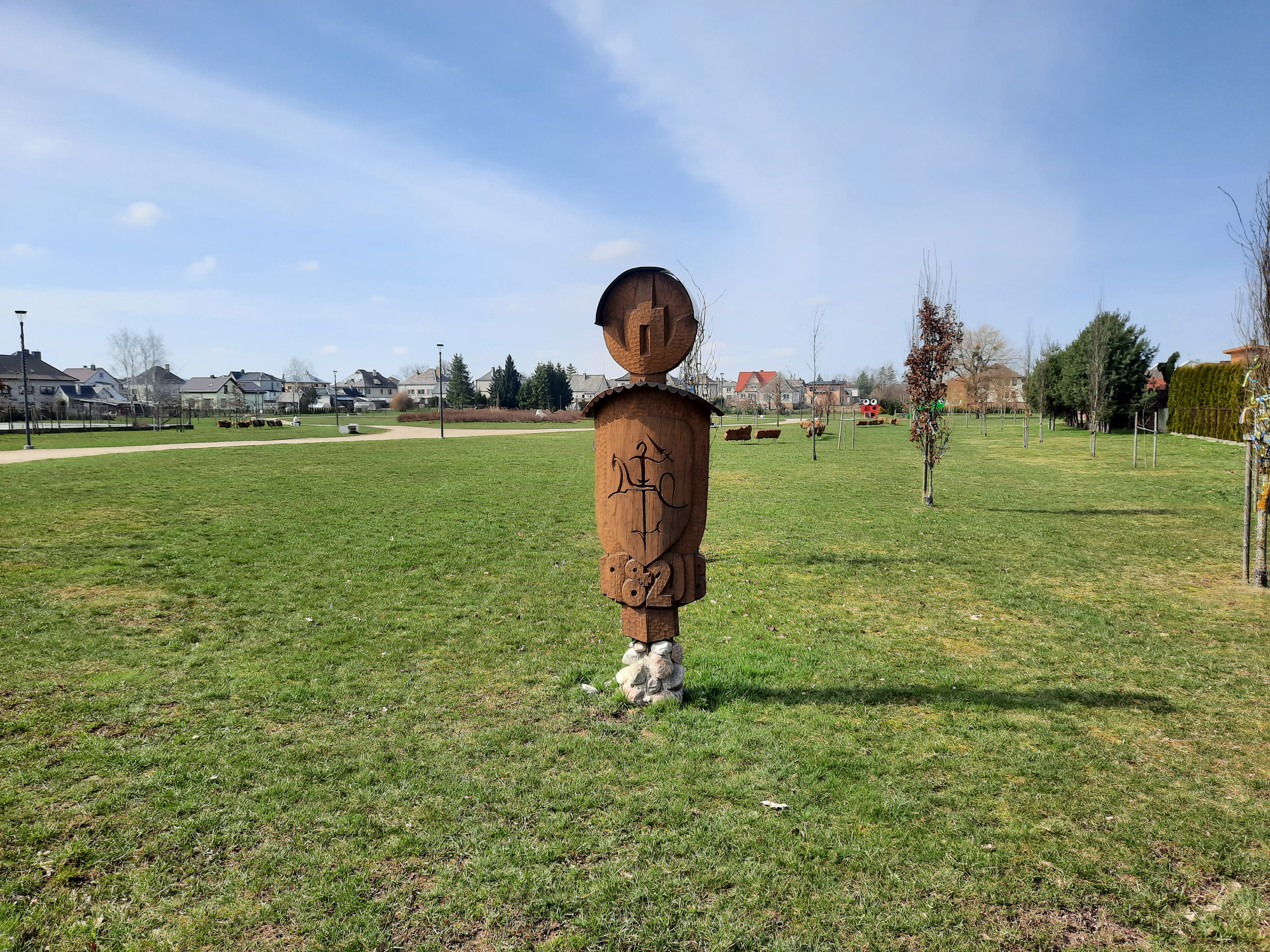
Monument celebrating the 100 years of the Republic of Lithuania

- Józef Godlewski (1773–1867), founder
- Jonas Algimantas Boruta (1944-2022), Roman Catholic prelate
- Juozas Gabrys (1880 – 1951), politician and advocate of Lithuanian independence, was born in Garliava. In his memoirs, he referred to himself as the "Count of Garliava."
- Darius Labanauskas (*1976), darts player

== Education ==
There are five schools: Garliavos Juozo Lukšos gymnasium, Garliavos Jonučių high school, Garliava high school, Kindergarten and primary school of Garliava, and Garliava school of arts and music.

== Sport ==
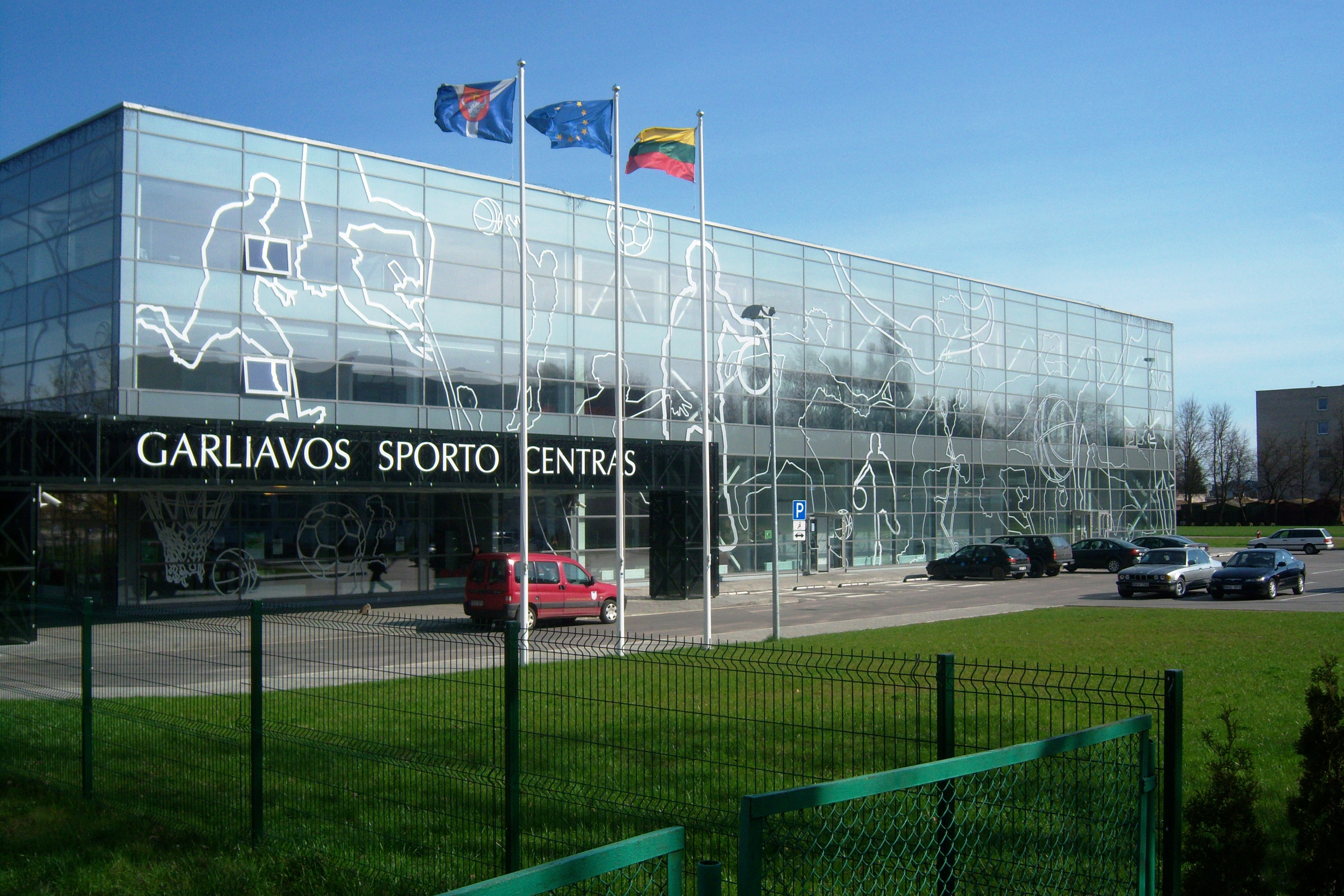
Sport centre

- FK Garliava football club;
- Stadium of the school of Adomas Mitkus.
