= Aniela Gruszecka =

Polish writer (1884–1976)

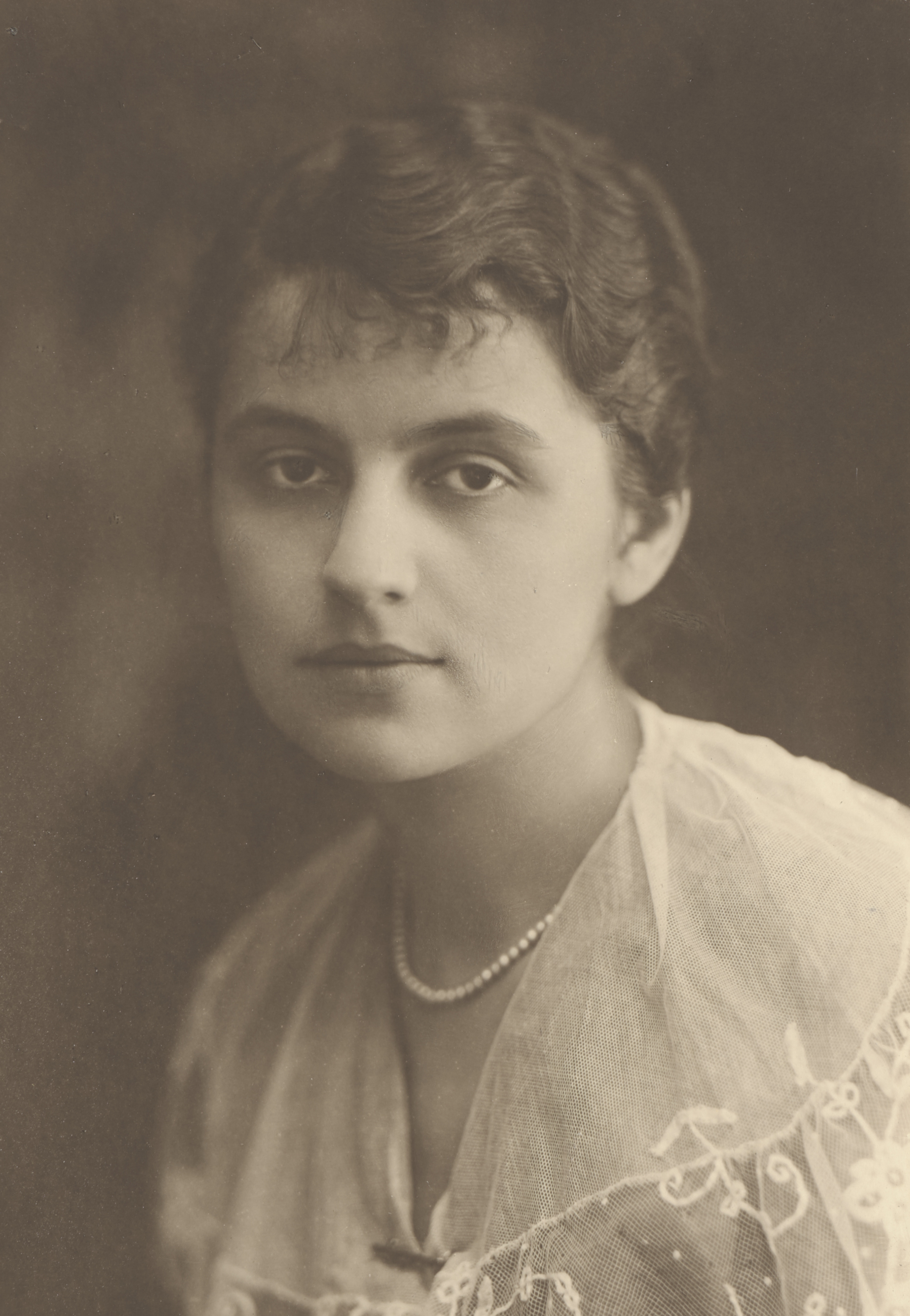
- Born: May 18, 1884; Warsaw, Congress Poland
- Died: April 18, 1976 (aged 91); Kraków, Polish People's Republic
- Education: Jagiellonian University, Kraków; Sorbonne University, Paris
- Occupations: Writer, translator, critic
- Spouse: Kazimierz Nitsch
- Writing career
- Years active: 1913–1975
- Genres: Historical
- Notable work: Przygoda w nieznanem kraje (Adventure in an Unknown Country)
- Notable awards: Knight's Cross of the Order of Polonia Restituta

Aniela Gruszecka (1884–1976) was a Polish writer, literary critic, and author of historical novels for children and young people. Her best-known novel, Przygoda w nieznanym kraju (Adventure in an Unknown Country), has been described as the first Polish Sapphic novel.

== Early life and education ==
Gruszecka was born on 18 May 1884 in Warsaw, the daughter of Artur Gruszecki, a novelist and publisher, and Józefa Certowicz, whose family came from Ukraine. She had two sisters and a brother. Gruszecka finished her school education in Kraków, passing her high school leaving exam with distinction as an external student at the boys' St. Anna's Gymnasium in May 1903 (one of her examiners was her future husband). She studied history at the Faculty of Philosophy of the Jagiellonian University in Kraków and then went to the Zurich Polytechnic before studying chemistry and physics at the Sorbonne University in Paris. Until this time the study of scientific subjects had been largely reserved for males, so her choice was possibly dictated by ambition, the desire to intellectually equal (or surpass) the opposite sex, and to study subjects inaccessible for women in Poland.

Around 1908, she married a man named Wysokinski and lived for some time in Nancy in France. This marriage was later annulled and on 30 July 1913, she married Kazimierz Nitsch (1874–1958), a wealthy professor of linguistics at the Jagiellonian University, ten years her senior, who would become president of the Polish Academy of Arts and Sciences. She would later describe his life and work in the book Cała życie nad przyrodą towarzyskią polskiego, published in 1976. Through her marriage she became associated with the intellectual and artistic environment of Kraków that she would later portray in Adventure in an Unknown Country. Their apartment in Kraków became an intellectual salon. They also travelled extensively.

== Writing ==
Gruszecka made her debut as a novelist in 1913 with W Słońca (In the Sun), which tells the story of the lives of two boys. This was published under the male pseudonym, Jan Powalski, at a time when it was difficult for women writers to be taken seriously. After her marriage she would publish under her maiden name. Her next book for adults, Przygoda w nieznanym kraju (Adventure in an Unknown Country), published in 1933 originally in instalments, was set in the intellectual and artistic circles of Kraków that she knew so well. The novel owes much to the inspiration Gruszecka took from the English writer, Virginia Woolf, particularly the novel To the Lighthouse. Like Woolf, Gruszecka was bisexual. Like To the Lighthouse her book discusses the passions of one woman for another, with her lead character coming to accept the possibility of her own homosexuality. She never hid the fact that Woolf was an inspiration for her work and, in fact, translated Woolf's books into Polish. The book also owed much to the embryonic feminist movement in Poland at the time, which was led by writers, editors, translators, and teachers. The male characters in the novel are presented in a negative light, quite stereotypically, with their flaws being exaggerated.

Gruszecka also wrote historical novels for young people, notably: Król (King - 1913), W grodzie żaków (In the students' town - 1913), Od Karpat nad Bałtyk (From the Carpathians to the Baltic Sea - 1946), Nad jeziorem (By the Lake - 1921) and Powieść o kronice Galla (The Chronicle of Gallus Novel – Six volumes, 1960–1970). The multi-volume Chronicle of Gallus is an epic review of the Polish Chronicle, discussing its origins, historical significance and the scientific disputes it stirred among successive generations. Gruszecka collaborated with the magazine Przegląd Współczesny, in which she published many studies on literature. In the same magazine she also published reviews of several famous debuts by young writers, such as books by Witold Gombrowicz, Adolf Rudnicki and Zbigniew Uniłowski. She also wrote for Przegląd Współczesny, Slavische Rundschau and Kobieta Współczesna.

== Awards and honours ==
On 10 November 1933, "for her merits in the field of literature", primarily the book, Adventure in an Unknown Country, Gruszecka was awarded the Knight's Cross of the Order of Polonia Restituta by the president of the Republic of Poland, Ignacy Mościcki.

She received the literary award of the city of Kraków in 1934 and the award of the National Culture Fund of the Kraków Voivodeship in 1948. For her outstanding achievements in the field of literature she was awarded the Jurzykowski Prize in 1968. More recently, she was one of one hundred writers from or connected with Kraków to have benches named after them in Planty Park in Kraków as part of the Kraków UNESCO City of Literature celebrations of 2014.

== Death ==
Gruszecka died on 18 April 1976 and was buried in the family tomb at the Rakowicki Cemetery in Kraków.

The archives of the Polish Academy of Arts and Sciences in Kraków contain unpublished typescripts and manuscripts by Gruszecka, including a children's novel entitled Dziewczynki (Girls), as well as a novel about the fate of post-war Polish migrants. In addition to extensive correspondence, the writer left scattered personal notes, kept since 1895. Interestingly, the archives are held in the name of her husband.
