= Map of Lithuania (1918) =

1918 political and ethnographic map by Vladas Daumantas and Juozas Gabrys

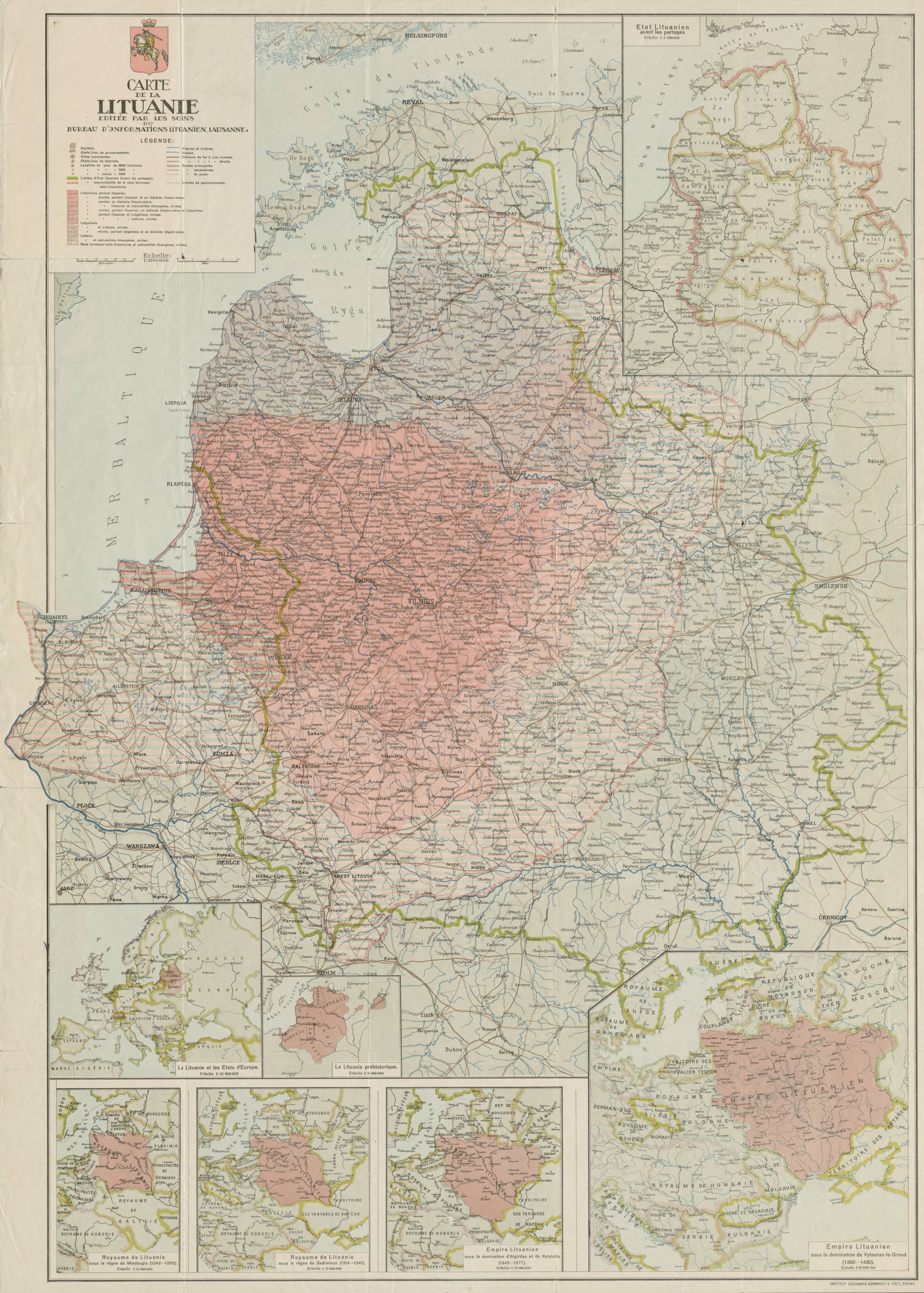
- The "Map of Lithuania" published in 1918.
- Author: Vladas Daumantas, Juozas Gabrys-Paršaitis
- Original title: Carte de la Lituanie
- Language: French
- Subject: Ethnographic map, propaganda
- Publisher: Lithuanian Information Bureau
- Publication date: 1918
- Publication place: Bern, Switzerland
- Media type: Map

The Map of Lithuania (French: Carte de la Lituanie) is a historical and ethnographic map created in 1918 by the Lithuanian diplomat and public figure Vladas Daumantas at the initiative of the Lithuanian Information Bureau (Bureau d'informations Lituanien) in Lausanne. The publication was one of several Lithuanian maps during the Paris Peace Conference that sought to justify the independence of Lithuania to the Allies. The scientific sources upon which the map was based remain unknown.

== Background and creation ==
The creation of the map was closely linked to the activities of Juozas Gabrys, a Lithuanian politician who, during World War I, directed the Lithuanian Information Bureau in Switzerland and actively popularized the idea of Lithuanian independence in the West. In 1915, Vladas Daumantas, along with other members of the Lithuanian student society Rūta in Fribourg, Switzerland, Juozas Purickis and Antanas Steponaitis, approached Gabrys offering to help prepare an informational brochure about Lithuania.

Having received authorization from the bureau, Daumantas designed the Vytis coat of arms, which was used on Lithuanian postage stamps (printed in Paris in 1916 and in Switzerland in 1917), on postcards, and in 1918 on the large ethnographic map of Lithuania.

== Description and content ==
The map was published in Bern in French. It was a large, colored folding map measuring 66 by 91 centimeters, drawn at a scale of 1:1,500,000. The cover featured the Vytis coat of arms designed by Daumantas.

In addition to the main field, which showed the contemporary settlement of peoples, several smaller historical maps (ranging in scale from 1:4,500,000 to 1:32,000,000) were inset into the map canvas. These demonstrated the evolution of Lithuanian borders at various historical stages:

- "Prehistoric Lithuania" (La Lituanie préhistorique);
- "The Kingdom of Lithuania during the reign of Mindaugas (1242–1263)";
- "The Kingdom of Lithuania during the reign of Gediminas (1316–1341)";
- "The Lithuanian Empire under the rule of Algirdas and Kęstutis (1345–1377)";
- "The Lithuanian Empire under the rule of Vytautas the Great (1392–1430)";
- "The Lithuanian State before the Partitions (1772–1795)";
- "Lithuania and the States of Europe".

== Cartographic propaganda and visual manipulation ==
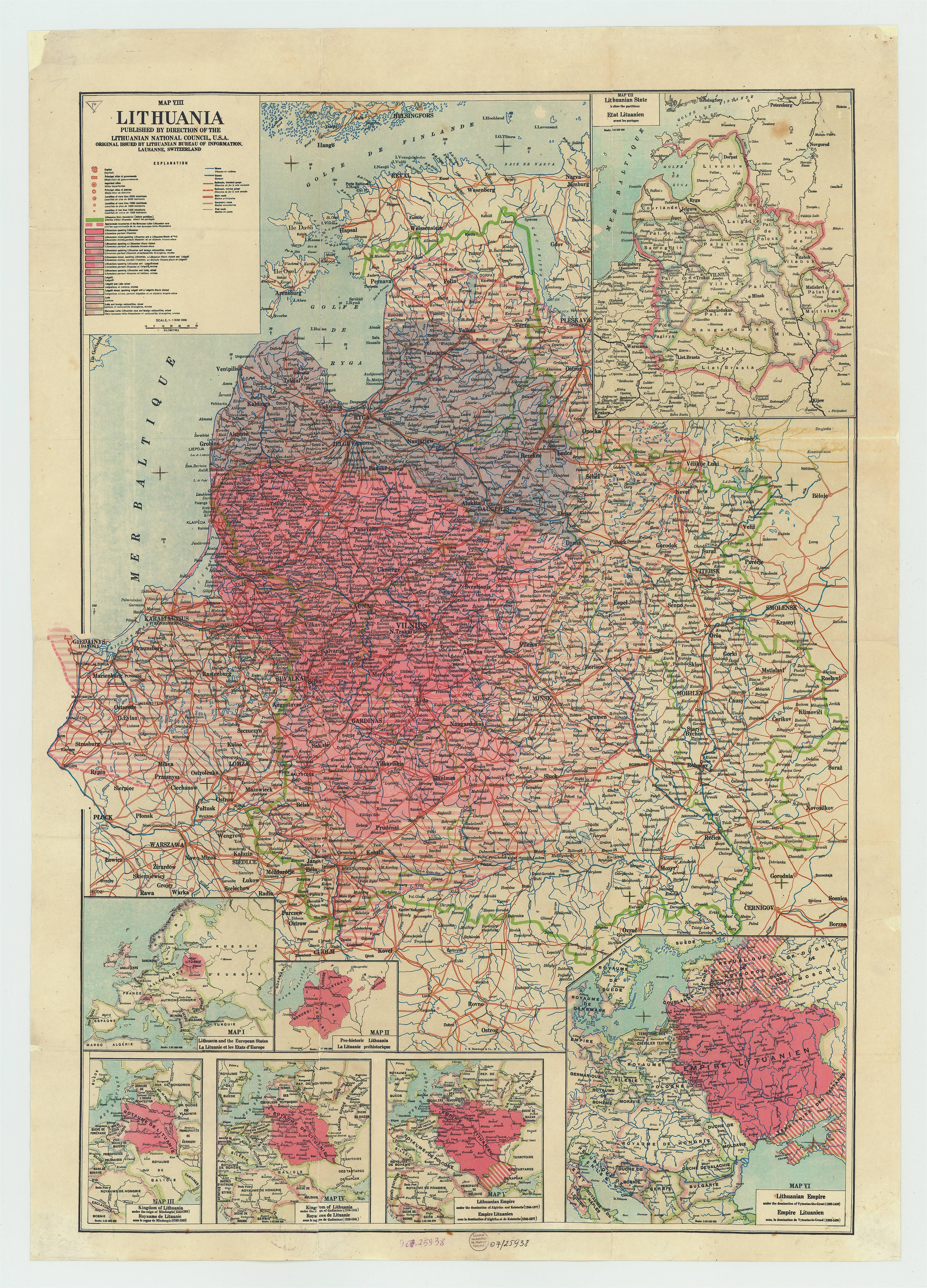
English-language variant of the map.

Like many other maps of that period (for example, the works of the Polish cartographer Eugeniusz Romer), the Map of Lithuania was not merely a scientific document but a powerful tool of political propaganda. The scientific sources on which the map was based are unknown.

The map's legend stood out for its unprecedented level of detail regarding Baltic peoples: it contained as many as seven levels of Lithuanian ethnicity (which included Lithuanians speaking Lithuanian, Lithuanians speaking a Lithuanian-Slavic dialect, Lithuanians mixed, speaking Lithuanian, a Lithuanian-Slavic dialect and Letgalli, and more), three levels for Latgalians, two for Latvians, and one separate mixed category—"Prussian-Latvian-Lithuanian mixture" (Borousso-Letto-Lituanienne mixtes).

The main strategy of the authors was visual manipulation through color shading and historical boundaries. The widest boundary on the map, within which semi-transparent pink hatching was used, corresponded to the borders of what the author called prehistoric Lithuania. It encompassed a vast territory that included Lithuania Minor (also known as East Prussia), the Łomża and Suwałki governorates, and most of Belarus, extending as far south as the Bug River (including Brest Litovsk) and as far east as the Berezina River. This boundary was justified by the settlement area of ancient Balts, including the Prussians, Yotvingians, and Galindians, which had long since disappeared or been assimilated. Because the differentiation between the various fragments and shades of pink used to denote Lithuanians on the map was minimal, it created an illusion for the unprepared viewer of a massive, continuous, and monolithic expanse of the modern Lithuanian nation. This massive visual image significantly exceeded the actual ethnographic boundaries of the Lithuanian-speaking population in the early 20th century and was designed to emotionally influence Western politicians, contrasting this expanse with the claims of Poland and Russia.

== Use and significance ==
The map played a noticeable role during the peace negotiations in Versailles. According to contemporaries, it hung in all the rooms of the Palace of Versailles where the peace commissions worked, serving as a visual aid for the delegates deciding the fate of post-war borders in Eastern Europe.

A total of four editions of this map were printed: three in Switzerland and one in the United States. The American edition was distributed among the large Lithuanian diaspora to raise funds and lobby for the interests of an independent Lithuania across the ocean.

== Bibliography ==
- Kapochunas, A. (2018). "The Maps and Mapmakers that Helped Define 20th-Century Lithuanian Boundaries - Part 5". Journal of the Lithuania Philatelic Society (246): 16–29.
