= Hallwag =

Swiss publishing and printing company

- Type: Publishing and printing company
- Industry: Publishing, printing, cartography
- Founded: 1912 in Bern, Switzerland
- Founder: Otto Richard Wagner
- Fate: Printing taken over by Benteli Druck AG (1998); publishing sold to Gräfe & Unzer (2001); cartography merged with Kümmerly & Frey to form Hallwag Kümmerly+Frey AG (2002)
- Headquarters: Bern, Switzerland,
- Products: Specialist magazines, road maps, books, atlases
- Website: https://www.swisstravelcenter.ch/en/

Hallwag was a Swiss publishing and printing company based in Bern, whose name is a contraction of "Haller and Wagner". It was a leading publisher of technical and specialist works as well as maps.

== History ==
Hallwag was founded in Bern in 1912, when Otto Richard Wagner—an emigrant from Rottenburg am Neckar and owner of the Wagner publishing house, established around 1900—took over the printing firm Haller AG, which dated from 1711. By 1914 Hallwag's seat was in the Lorraine district of Bern. Wagner published specialist magazines, including Revue automobile, Sport, Die schweizerische Baukunst, Technische Rundschau, and the Revue suisse de médecine. In the 1920s the catalogue was enlarged with a collection of road maps (Europa Touring).

During the Second World War Hallwag moved into book publishing, later adding paperback collections and the Helveticus yearbook. The company dominated the market for technical and specialist works (medicine, zoology, natural sciences) as well as cartography. In 1998 the printing works closed and its activities were taken over by Benteli Druck AG in Bern. In 2001 the Munich publishing house Gräfe & Unzer bought Hallwag's publishing division.

At the end of 2001 Hallwag acquired the cartographic department of the bankrupt Kümmerly & Frey, and on 11 March 2002 the two map businesses were combined into a new company, Hallwag Kümmerly+Frey AG. Around the same time the German group Mairs acquired a majority of the cartography business. The company is still active and has been part of the MairDumont group since 2016.

== Bibliography ==
- Fünfzig Jahre Hallwag AG, 1912–1962, 1962
