= Kazimierz Nitsch =

Polish linguist (1874–1958)

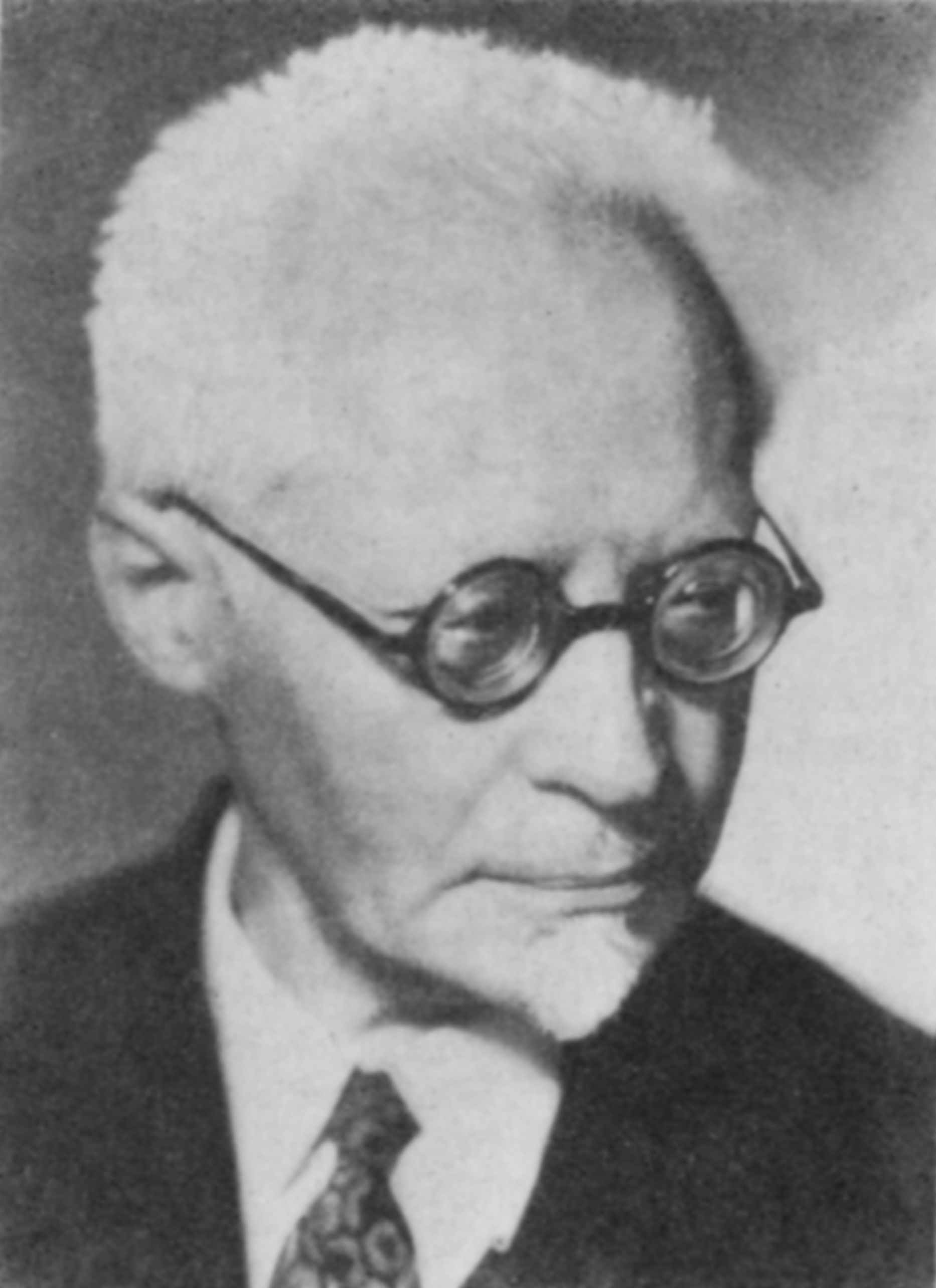
- Born: Kazimierz Ignacy Nitsch; February 1, 1874; Kraków, Grand Duchy of Kraków
- Died: September 26, 1958 (aged 84); Kraków, Poland
- Board member of: Commission for the Determination of Place Names; Polish Academy of Arts and Sciences; Polish Academy of Sciences
- Partner: Aniela Gruszecka
- Parent: Maximilian Nitsch
- Relatives: Roman Nitsch

Academic background
- Education: Bartłomiej Nowodworski High School
- Alma mater: Academy of Learning
- Thesis: Stosunki pokrewieństwa języków lechickich (1908)
- Doctoral advisor: Jan Michał Rozwadowski

Academic work
- Discipline: Linguistics
- Sub-discipline: Dialects of Polish
- Institutions: Jagiellonian University; Uniwersytet Jana Kazimierza
- Notable ideas: Chełmno–Kociewie–Warmia dialect

Kazimierz Ignacy Nitsch (1 February, 1874 – 26 September, 1958) was a Polish Slavic linguist, historian of the Polish language and dialectologist. He was one of the co-founders of the Society of Polish Language Enthusiasts and in the years 1919–1958 he edited the organ of the society "Polish Language". In 1901, he began dialectological research in Kashubia. President of the Polish Academy of Arts and Sciences.

Son of Maximilian Nitsch, a Polish architect. He was educated at St. Anne's Gymnasium. In 1903, he obtained a scholarship from the Academy of Arts and Sciences and went to study in Prague and Paris. After his return in 1904, he began researching Pomeranian dialects. In 1908 he obtained his postdoctoral degree under the supervision of Jan Rozwadowski on the basis of the work Relationships of the Lechitic languages kinship. In 1911 he became an associate professor at the Jagiellonian University and worked alongside Jan Łoś. In 1917 he moved to the Jan Kazimierz University in Lviv and took up the independent position of professor of Polish language there, but in 1920 he returned to the Jagiellonian University to take over the position of professor of Slavic philology abandoned by Jan Łoś, and after the death of Łoś in 1928 also the chair of Polish language.

He belonged to the leading Polish scientific academies, such as Polish Academy of Learning (1911 correspondent member, 1924 active member), Polish Academy of Sciences (1952 full member), Warsaw Scientific Society (1932 regular member). He was an expert of the Polish delegation at the Paris peace conference in 1919, dealing with geographic and ethnographic issues. In 1939 he retired. On November 6, 1939, he was arrested as part of the Sonderaktion Krakau operation, imprisoned in Sachsenhausen, from where he was released in February 1940.

In the years 1946–1952 he was the president of the PAU, from 1952 he was a full member of the Polish Academy of Sciences, in the years 1952–1957 vice-president of the Polish Academy of Sciences, and in the years 1952–1958 a member of its presidium. After the war, he was a member of the Commission for the Determination of Place Names.

He was buried at the Rakowicki Cemetery in Kraków.

His wife was Aniela Gruszecka, a writer, daughter of Artur Gruszecki, a writer and journalist. Kazimierz's cousin was Roman Nitsch, a microbiologist, a member of the Polish Academy of Arts and Sciences.
