= Chełmno–Kocievian–Warmian dialect =

Dialect of Polish language

- dialekt chełmińsko-kociewsko-warmiński
- Native to: Poland
- Region: Kuyavian-Pomeranian Voivodeship; Pomeranian Voivodeship; Warmian-Masurian Voivodeships
- Language family: Indo-European: Balto-Slavic; Slavic; West Slavic; Lechitic; East Lechitic; Polish; Greater Polish; Chełmno–Kocievian–Warmian dialect
- Writing system: Latin (Polish alphabet)

Language codes
- ISO 639-3: –
- Glottolog: None
- IETF: pl-kociewie
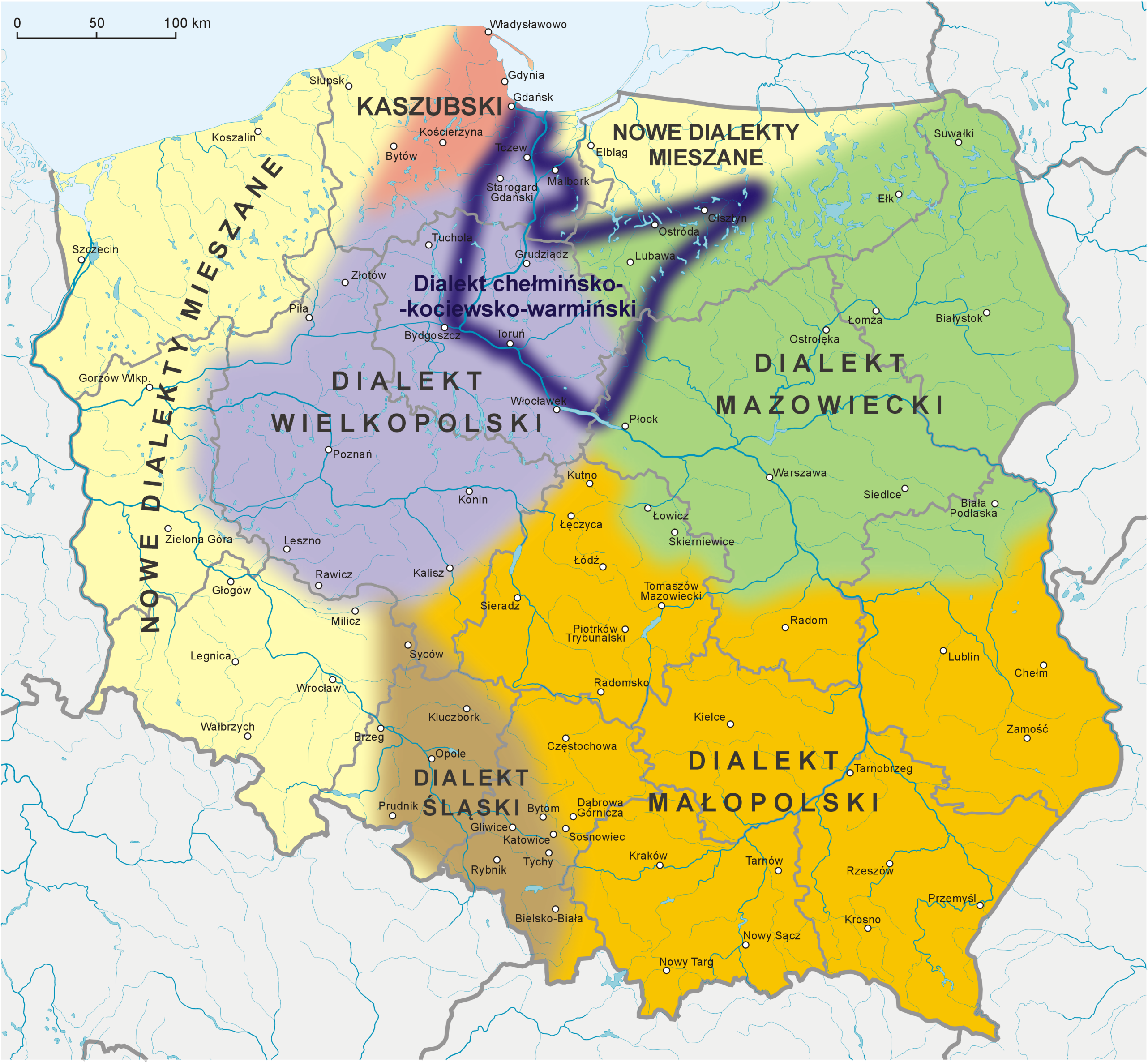
- Map of the dialects of Polish, including the Chełmno Kociewie Warmian dialect marked with the purple line.

Chełmno–Kocievian–Warmian dialect (Polish: Dialekt chełmińsko-kociewsko-warmiński) was a dialectal grouping of Polish dialects used in the Kuyavian-Pomeranian, Pomeranian, and Warmian-Masurian Voivodeships. It is considered by some linguists as a branch of the Greater Poland dialect, while also, as a separate dialect, by others.

Now generally considered separate dialects, see Kociewie dialect, Chełmo-Dobrzyń dialect, and Warmia dialect, which is a Masovian dialect.
