= Kümmerly & Frey =

Swiss cartography company

- Company type: Joint-stock company
- Industry: Cartography, publishing
- Founded: 1852 in Bern, Switzerland
- Founder: Gottfried Kümmerly
- Defunct: 2001
- Fate: Bankruptcy (2001); cartography merged into Hallwag Kümmerly+Frey AG (2002)
- Headquarters: Zollikofen (from 1996); Bern (1852–1996)
- Products: Maps, atlases, illustrated books, school materials
- Number of employees: 250 (1977)

Kümmerly & Frey was a Swiss cartography and publishing company. It originated in a lithography business founded in 1852 and became a noted map and atlas publisher before going bankrupt in 2001.

== History ==
The company originated in the lithography business founded by Gottfried Kümmerly in Bern in 1852, which printed its first map that same year. Hermann Kümmerly and his brother Arnold took over the management in 1884, and Julius Frey, Hermann's cousin and brother-in-law, became a partner in 1898. His brother Heinrich Frey took over the company in 1912, with his cousin Max Frey and Walter Kümmerly succeeding in 1931. The firm was converted into a joint-stock company in 1944.

The geographical publishing house, founded in 1902, published atlases and journals, and from 1950 also illustrated books. Continuing its diversification, Kümmerly & Frey created a department specializing in school materials in 1969, among others.

The firm moved to Zollikofen in 1996. From 1997 it collaborated with a computing company, with the production of maps and tourist information becoming largely automated. It employed 75 people in 1927, 110 in 1952, 250 in 1977, 133 in 2000, and 69 in 2001.

After the company went bankrupt in December 2001, its cartographic department—along with its rights, programs, map stock, and company name—was acquired by Hallwag AG. On 11 March 2002 the two map businesses were combined into a new company, Hallwag Kümmerly+Frey AG. The company is still active and has been part of the MairDumont group since 2016.

== Bibliography ==
- 80 Jahre Lithographie [und] Kartographie, 1852–1932, 1932
- Kartographie in der Schweiz, exhibition catalogue, Zürich, 1953
- Firmengeschichte, 1977
