= Jan Michał Rozwadowski =

Polish linguist (1867–1935)

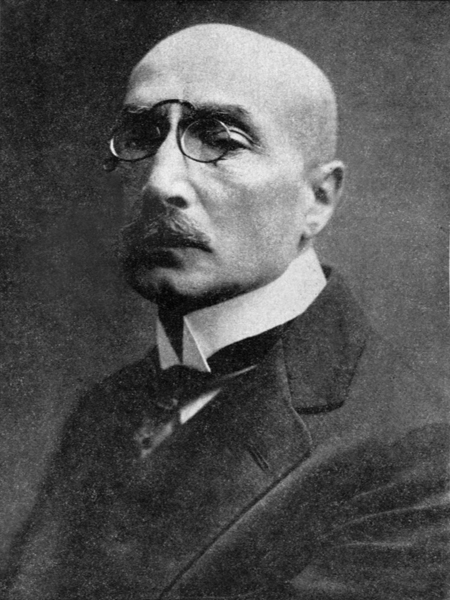
- Born: 7 December 1867; Czarna, Austria-Hungary
- Died: 13 March 1935 (aged 67); Warsaw, Poland
- Scientific career
- Fields: Linguistics, specifically the Polish language
- Institutions: Jagiellonian University; Polish Academy of Learning

Jan Michał Rozwadowski (7 December 1867 – 13 March 1935) was a Polish linguist and a professor at the Jagiellonian University. He was also the president of the Polish Academy of Learning.
