= Ethnographic mapping =

Ethnographic mapping is a technique used by anthropologists to record and visually display activity of research participants within a given space over time. Ethnographic mapping is used to show and understand human interaction within a layout that displays events, places, and resources. Anthropologists can use the contents of space and time to interpret a unique perspective of the daily lives of a setting and its people. Not only can ethnographic mapping be used to show the contents of space, but it can also show more abstract contents like organizational structure, processes, and important history.

== Mapping space ==
The essence of this ethnographic mapping is ethnography, which enables the researcher to use qualitative research methods like fieldnotes, participant observation, and interviewing. As an ethnographer, one is required to completely immerse oneself within a setting, behaving as a participant observer; therefore, ethnographers have to deal with the constraints of not having the capability of measuring and laying out a traditional styled map. Ethnographers tend to capture space using approximation rather than accuracy because time is valuable and more beneficial if used in performing fieldwork. Using basic map-making principles, ethnographers can create relatively accurate maps.

=== Geographical informational systems ===
Anthropologists can take advantage of computer assisted programs that enhance ethnographic mapping such as GIS (Geographical Information Systems). GIS is a computer system capable of managing large amounts of data while also generating data with existing databases. GIS displays spatially referenced forms of data, and has been used in a variety of research applications such as archaeological regional settlement patterns and designing and implementing development projects. GIS has become an increasingly popular technology to use with ethnographic methodologies, specifically with interviewing because of its ability to analyze, compare, and visualize responses.

=== Triangulation ===
When mapping the contents of space in a setting researchers are required to use tools of some sort to gain a relatively close measurement of distance and angles. It is common knowledge in ethnography that not every measurement can be accurate, and for that, there is a method called triangulation that allows researchers to expedite field measurements. Triangulation requires measuring distance and angles with approximate precision, thus creating triangles linked by identifiable features of a setting that network together to determine distances of relative positions of a setting.

== Mapping organizational structure ==
Ethnographic mapping can be used as a tool to visualize organizational structure to indicate inter-organizational relationships and power dynamics. This type of mapping is called organizational mapping and displays hierarchical navigation of the people within a specific organization. These maps can be representational, meaning that they show important figures by name, or they can be comprehensive showing the entire organizational structure.

== Processes ==
Mapping out how humans do things is a great tool for ethnographers to understand operations and simulate cognitive processes. This type of mapping is called process mapping, and the goal is for the ethnographer to help the reader understand complex activities using mapping to aid research and description.
