= Jewish Partisan Educational Foundation =

Holocaust education organization

- Founded: 2000
- Founder: Mitch Braff
- Type: Non-profit organization
- Purpose: Educational (Holocaust Resistance)
- Location: San Francisco, CA
- Region served: Worldwide
- Board of directors: Board President: Elliott Felson
- Website: jewishpartisans.org jewishpartisancommunity.org

The Jewish Partisan Educational Foundation (JPEF) is a nonprofit organization based in San Francisco, California, that produces short films and other educational materials on the history and life lessons of the Jewish partisans. During World War II, approximately 30,000 Jewish men and women fought back against the Germans and their collaborators as partisans (armed resistance fighters behind enemy lines).

JPEF provides free educational resources for public, Jewish and other parochial and private schools, including short documentary films, lesson plans, study guides, and online teacher-training. The materials are primarily based on oral history interviews, conducted between 2001 and 2015, 54 Jewish partisans. The Jewish Partisan Educational Foundation partners with nearly every Holocaust organization in the world who relies on its resources and expertise about the Jewish partisan history throughout Europe.

JPEF creates curriculum materials for educators and students. A second website, Jewish Partisan Community page, launched in 2017, hosts an additional 70 Jewish partisans biographies.

== History ==
Filmmaker Mitch Braff founded JPEF in 2000 after meeting former Jewish partisan Murray Gordon - the first time Braff had heard about organized, armed Jewish resistance during the Holocaust. Discovering that this piece of history was largely unknown in the U.S., even among American Jews, Braff founded JPEF to interview many more partisans, archive their testimonies, and create films, curricula and a website dedicated to their history. Founding Board President, Paul Orbuch, the son of Jewish partisan Sonia Orbuch, helped Braff launch the organization.

In 2003 JPEF produced its first film, "Introduction to the Jewish Partisans", narrated by the late actor Ed Asner (cousin of Jewish partisan Abe Asner).

In 2008 JPEF developed "Pictures of Resistance", a traveling exhibit of photographs taken by the only known Jewish partisan photographer, Faye Schulman. That same year, JPEF consulted for director Edward Zwick on the production of the motion picture Defiance, which portrays the story of the Bielski partisans, starring Daniel Craig and Liev Schreiber star as Jewish partisan commanders Tuvia and Zus Bielski.

According to JPEF, as of 2022 their educational materials, films and teacher training institutes and online professional development courses have reached over tens of thousands of educators and millions of students worldwide.

== Program Offerings ==
Website

Online resources include maps, archival photographs, and online profiles with video testimonies for over 54 Jewish partisans including Tuvia Bielski, Frank Blaichman, Vitka Kempner, Abba Kovner, Faye Schulman, and Shalom Yoran.

Curricula

Lesson plans and study guides use the experiences of the Jewish partisans to teach history, leadership, ethics, women's studies, and Jewish values. The curricula, for 6th-12th grade and college, are edited by Holocaust scholar Dr. Michael Berenbaum. More than 60 Holocaust organizations incorporate JPEF's materials into their programs, including the United States Holocaust Memorial Museum, Facing History and Ourselves, the Association of Holocaust Organizations, and the New Jersey Commission on Holocaust Education. JPEF is also a contributor/publishing partner to the Encyclopædia Britannica's Holocaust history project.

Teacher Training

Online professional development courses on Jewish armed resistance during the Holocaust are offered on JPEF's website, with continuing education units awarded through Touro College. JPEF also conducts in-service workshops in the U.S. and internationally.

Photography Exhibit

Pictures of Resistance: The Wartime Photography of Jewish Partisan Faye Schulman, is a traveling exhibit of historical photos by the only known Jewish partisan photographer. The exhibit, curated by Jill Vexler, has been displayed in more than 30 cities in the United States, Canada, Israel, Poland, South Africa, Australia and Switzerland.

== Films ==
JPEF has produced 12 short documentaries directed by Braff, and narrated by Ed Asner, Larry King, Liev Schreiber, and Tovah Feldshuh. In chronological order:

- Introduction to the Jewish Partisans
- Women in the Partisans Living & Surviving in the Partisans: Food
- Living & Surviving in the Partisans: Winter and Night
- Living & Surviving in the Partisans: Medicine
- Living & Surviving in the Partisans: Shelter
- Antisemitism in the Partisans
- The Partisans Through the Eyes of the Soviet Newsreel
- A Partisan Returns: The Legacy of Two Sisters
- Introduction to the Bielski Brothers
- The Reunion
- Survival in the Forest: Isidore Karten & the Partisans
