= Bielski =

Bielski is a Polish-language toponymic surname derived from one of placenames derived from the adjective biały, "white": Biała, Białe, Bielsk, Bielsko. The Lithuanized form is Bielskis/Bielskiene/Bielskytė, Latvian: Beslkis, East Slavic: Belsky.

Notable people with the surname include:

== World War II partisans ==
- Bielski partisans, a World War II Jewish partisan group in German-occupied Poland led by four brothers:
  - Tuvia Bielski (1906–1987), a Jewish partisan of the Second World War and leader of the Bielski partisans; oldest of the four brothers
  - Asael Bielski (1908–1945), second oldest of the four brothers
  - Alexander Zeisal Bielski (nicknamed "Zus") (1912–1995), second youngest of the four brothers
  - Aron Bielski (1927–2025), youngest of the four brothers

== Others ==
- Adi Bielski (born 1982), Israeli theatre and film actress
- Dick Bielski (1932–2023), American NFL football player and coach
- Henryk Bielski (1935–2025), Polish film director
- Joan Bielski (1923–2012), Australian activist
- Marcin Bielski (1495–1575), a Polish chronicler of the 16th Century
- Ze'ev Bielski (born 1949), Israeli Knesset member and former chairman of the Jewish Agency for Israel
