= The Bielski Brothers =

2003 non-fiction book by Peter Duffy

The Bielski Brothers: The True Story of Three Men Who Defied the Nazis, Built a Village in the Forest, and Saved 1,200 Jews is a non-fiction book by Peter Duffy, which was published in 2003. It tells the story of Tuvia Bielski, Alexander Zeisal Bielski (Zus), Aharon Bielski, and Asael Bielski, four Jewish brothers who established a large partisan camp in the forests of Belarus during World War II which participated in resistance activities against the Nazi occupation of the country, and so saved 1,200 Jews from the Nazis. The book describes how, in 1941, three brothers witnessed their parents and two other siblings being led away to their eventual murders. The brothers fought back against Germans and collaborators, waging guerrilla warfare in the forests of Belarus. By using their intimate knowledge of the dense forests surrounding the towns of Lida and Novogrudek, the Bielskis evaded the Nazis and established a hidden base camp, then set about convincing other Jews to join their ranks. The Germans came upon them once but were unable to get rid of them. As more Jews arrived each day, a robust community began to emerge; a "Jerusalem in the woods". In July 1944, after some 30 months in the woods, the Bielskis learned that the Germans, overrun by the Red Army, were retreating back toward Berlin.

At the end of the war, with Soviet control of Belarus becoming increasingly oppressive, the surviving Bielskis fled to Romania, traveling on to the British Mandate of Palestine and eventually to the United States. Asael was drafted into the Soviet Red Army and was killed in action at Marlbork in 1944.

== Critical reaction ==
Publishers Weekly wrote: "This is a story about heroes, and Duffy does a masterful job of telling it." The publication noted that, after the war when Tuvia Bielski was living in Brooklyn, "no one knew that the local immigrant truck driver had once commanded the feared Bielski brigade. It is time the three brothers received their due."

The Library Journal critic wrote that the book "relates in vivid detail the World War II saga of the Bielski partisans", adding "[a]lthough clearly impressed with the Bielskis' accomplishments, as well as with the men themselves, Duffy does not let that detract from recounting the less noble aspects of partisan life."

The critic for the Kirkus Reviews called it a "powerful recounting of a little-known story" and that the book was "more uplifting than most" Holocaust books, adding that the "day-in, day-out account of the next four years is an often unbearably intense chronicle of horror and courage. A novel telling a similar story would almost certainly be dismissed as outlandish, but Duffy's copious endnotes convincingly document the saga's reality."
