= Tuvia Bielski =

Polish leader of the Bielski group, Jewish partisans

- Bielski c. 1950–1955
- Born: May 8, 1906; Stankiewicze, near Novogrudok, Russian Empire (now Belarus)
- Died: June 12, 1987 (aged 81); New York City, U.S.
- Known for: Bielski partisans
- Spouse: Lila Tiktin (m. 1943)
- Children: 3
- Relatives: Asael Bielski, brother Alexander Zeisal Bielski, brother Aron Bielski, brother

Tuvia Bielski (May 8, 1906 – June 12, 1987) was a Polish Jewish militant who was leader of the Bielski group, a group of Jewish partisans who set up refugee camps for Jews fleeing the Holocaust during World War II. Their camp was situated in the Naliboki forest, which was part of Poland between World War I and World War II, and which is now in western Belarus.

== Biography ==
Bielski grew up in the only Jewish family in Stankiewicze. The small village in Eastern Poland (now Western Belarus) is located between the towns of Lida and Navahrudak, both of which housed Jewish ghettos during World War II.

Tuvia was the son of David and Beila Bielski, who had 12 children: 10 boys and two girls. Tuvia was the third eldest. His brothers Asael, Alexander ("Zus") and Aron were later to become members of his partisan group.

In 1927, Bielski was recruited into the Polish Army, where he eventually became a corporal in the 30th Infantry Battalion. After completing his military service, Bielski returned home. In an effort to add to his family's income, he rented another mill. This income was still inadequate, so in 1929, at the age of 23, he married an older woman named Rifka who owned a general store and a large house. The couple lived in the nearby small town of Subotniki.

During the Soviet occupation in 1939, Bielski feared that he would be arrested by the NKVD due to his "bourgeois capitalist" occupation, so he moved to Lida. Before Tuvia left Subotniki he urged his wife, Rifka, to join him in the move to Lida. She refused.

In Soviet-controlled Lida, Bielski met and fell in love with another woman named Sonia Warshavsky. The love affair became serious. In late 1939, Bielski divorced his wife, Rifka and married Sonia, though they were not yet "officially" married due to wartime conditions. Sonia was killed while taking shelter with others in a peasant home. In 1943, Tuvia married Lila "Lilka" Tiktin, who was only 17 at the time. They knew each other before the war and stayed married until his death 44 years later.

== World War II ==
When Operation Barbarossa began, Tuvia, Zus, and Asael were called up by their army units to fight against the Nazi German occupiers. Tuvia recalls: "Suddenly about 50 planes (Luftwaffe) flew over the town dropping incendiary bombs. In a few minutes the entire place was on fire. The commander called us in, ordered us to leave the burning town and regroup in a forest about five kilometers from there. We were to continue working. We carried out his command but soon after we began our job in the forest another wave of planes flew over the area and set the woods on fire. The commander called us in and said: 'Friends, you are on your own!'" After the units disbanded, the Bielski brothers fled to Stankiewicze, where their parents lived. In early July 1941, a German army unit arrived in Stankiewicze and Jewish residents were moved to a ghetto in Nowogródek. The four Bielski brothers managed to flee to the nearby forest. Their parents, two of their brothers and other family members, including Rifka and Zus' wife and child, were killed in the ghetto on December 8, 1941.

Tuvia Bielski led a group of Jewish partisans who hid in the forest. Although always hunted by Nazis, Bielski's group continued to grow. They periodically raided the ghettos to help people escape. They lived in the forests for over two years, and in their camp, they built a school, a hospital, and a nursery. As the leader of the Bielski partisans, his aim was to save the lives of Jews, where he could make a large impact, rather than getting involved with skirmishes with Nazis, where their effect would be negligible. Thus, they did not explicitly seek to attack railroads and roads that the German Nazis were using as supply routes but did sometimes carry out such attacks to save Jews at risk of being killed by Nazis in the Holocaust. The Bielski partisans ultimately saved the lives of more than 1,200 Jews.

In 1944, Asael Bielski was conscripted into the Soviet Army and killed in battle in Germany.

== Later life ==
After the war, Tuvia, Zus and their wives went to Israel via Romania, and ultimately immigrated to the United States in 1956. They joined their older brother Walter in New York, where he had gone before the war. Tuvia and Zus ran a small trucking firm in New York City for 30 years. He remained married to Lilka for the remainder of their lives. They had three children: sons Michael and Robert, and daughter Ruth, and ten grandchildren. Granddaughter Sharon Rennert made a documentary about her family called In Our Hands: The Legacy of the Bielski Partisans.

When Tuvia died in 1987, he was nearly penniless. He was initially buried on Long Island; one year after his death, his remains were exhumed and taken to Jerusalem, where he was given a state funeral with full military honors in 1988. The exact grave is at Har Tamir, a part of Har HaMenuchot. The following location is in Hebrew using Latin letters: Gush taf-bet, Chelka daled, Shura 19, kever 11 (block 402, section 4, row 19, grave 11).

== Legacy ==
Daniel Craig portrayed Tuvia in the film Defiance (2008), adapted from the 1993 historical book "Defiance: The Bielski Partisans" by sociologist and holocaust survivor Nechama Tec. On IMDb the film gets a steady rating of 7.1 out of 10 based over 140,000 general audience users rating. It has been however criticised in Poland due to its portrayal of Soviet partisans, who fought along the Bielskis, ignoring a massacre of Polish civilians conducted by Soviet-aligned partisans in Naliboki. The official investigation by the Polish Institute of National Remembrance's Commission for the Prosecution of Crimes against the Polish Nationultimately did not find conclusive evidence linking the Bielski partisans to the crime.

Bielski's memoirs, a manuscript written in Yiddish, were discovered in 2009 in Bielski's estate at the YIVO in New York. It was planned to be translated into English and published in 2012. While it hasn't been yet widely printed as a mainstream English book in 2026, it has been used by scholars and historians and some incorporated large excerpts in their own books, including Nechama Tec in Defiance (1993) and Peter Duffy in The Bielski Brothers (2003).
