= 2013 British Academy Scotland Awards =

- Date: 17 November 2013
- Site: Radisson Blu Hotel, Glasgow, Scotland
- Hosted by: Edith Bowman

Television coverage
- Network: Streaming webcast

The 2013 British Academy Scotland Awards were held on 17 November 2013 at the Radisson Blu Hotel in Glasgow, honouring the best Scottish film and television productions of 2013. Presented by BAFTA Scotland, accolades are handed out for the best in feature-length film that were screened at British cinemas during 2012. The Nominees were announced on 23 October 2014. The ceremony was broadcast online via YouTube and was hosted by Edith Bowman.

Richard Wilson, Kirsty Wark, Steve Begg and Rockstar North were honoured with Outstanding Contribution awards at this ceremony.

== Winners and nominees ==
Winners are listed first and highlighted in boldface.

Best Feature Film	Best Director
**For those in Peril**: Fire In The Night; The Wee Man	**Emma Davie & Morag McKinnon – I Am Breathing**: Kenny Glenaan – Case Histories; Paul Wright – For those in Peril
Best Actor/Actress in Film	Best Actor/Actress in Television
**George MacKay – For those in Peril as Aaron**: Iain De Caestecker – Not Another Happy Ending as Roddy; Martin Compston – The Wee Man as Paul Ferris	**Peter Mullan – The Fear as Richie Beckett**: Ford Kiernan – The Field of Blood as George McVie; Sharon Rooney – My Mad Fat Diary as Rachel 'Rae' Earl / Rae
Best Writer Film/Television	Best Comedy/Entertainment Programme
**Robert Jones – Murder**: Bryan Elsley – Skins; Paul Wright – For those in Peril	**Limmy's Show – (BBC Scotland), (The Comedy Unit)**: Bob Servant Independent – (BBC Scotland), (BBC Four); Mrs Brown's Boys – (BBC Scotland)
Best Factual Series	Best Features/ Factual Entertainment Programme
**Operation Iceberg – (BBC Scotland), (BBC Two)**: A Culture Show Special: Sincerely, F. Scott Fitzgerald – (BBC Scotland), (BBC Two); Making Faces – (Channel 5)	**Bank of Dave - Fighting The Fat Cats – (Channel 4)**: Kirstie's Fill Your House For Free – (Channel 4); Victoria Wood's Nice Cup of Tea – (BBC One)
Best Single Documentary	Best Television Drama
**Fire In The Night – (STV), (BBC Scotland)**: I Am Breathing – (Scottish Documentary Institute); The Murder Trial – (Channel 4)	**Murder – (BBC Scotland)**: Case Histories – (BBC Scotland); The Crash – (BBC Scotland)
Best Current Affairs	Best Children's Programme
**Sins Of Our Fathers – (BBC Scotland)**: Panorama: The Truth About Pills and Pregnancy – (BBC One); Road to Referendum – (STV)	**Comic Relief Does Glee Club Live Final – (CBBC), (BBC Scotland)**: My Story, RNLI – (CBeebies), (BBC Scotland); Nina and the Neurons Go Engineering – (CBeebies), (BBC Scotland)
Best Game	Best Animation
**Coolson's Artisanal Chocolate Alphabet – Things Made Out of Other Things**: Impossible Road – Pixels on Toast; Mr Shingu's Paper Zoo – Stormcloud Games Limited	**Hart's Desire – Gavin C Robinson**: The Man Who Mistook His Wife for a Hat – Ross Hogg; Seams and Embers – Claire Lamond

=== Outstanding Contribution to Film and Television ===
- **Richard Wilson**

=== Outstanding Contribution to Craft (In Memory of Robert McCann) ===
- Steve Begg

=== Outstanding Contribution to Broadcasting ===
- **Kirsty Wark**

=== Special Award for 2013 ===
- **Rockstar North**

=== BAFTA Scotland Cineworld Audience Award ===
- **The Wee Man**

== See also ==
- BAFTA Scotland
- 66th British Academy Film Awards
- 85th Academy Awards
- 19th Screen Actors Guild Awards
- 33rd Golden Raspberry Awards
