= Partisans in the Baltic States =

Partisans in the Baltic States may refer to:

- Forest Brothers, anti-Soviet partisan groups active in the Baltics 1944-1956
- Soviet partisans, pro-Soviet partisan groups active in German-occupied territories including the Baltic region during World War II

== See also ==
- Jewish partisans, anti-Nazi partisan groups active in Lithuania, among other regions, during World War II
