= The Defiant =

World War II memoir by Shalom Yoran

The Defiant: A True Story
- First edition (US)
- Author: Shalom Yoran
- Subject: Holocaust
- Genre: autobiography
- Publisher: St. Martin's Press (US); The Book Guild Ltd (UK)
- Publication date: 1996
- Pages: 293 pages, [14] pages of plates
- ISBN: 0312145853
- OCLC: 34690950
- LC Class: DS135.P63 Y67 1996

The Defiant: A True Story of Jewish Vengeance and Survival is a World War II memoir by Shalom Yoran, a Holocaust survivor and a former Jewish partisan. It was written in the late 1940s, shortly after the war, but only published in 1996 after the author rediscovered his manuscript (written in Polish) and dictated it in Hebrew for translation into English.

He wrote his memoirs, illustrating his harrowing experience during the war, at the age of 21, but they remained unpublished for five decades.
