= Asael Bielski =

Jewish partisan (1908–1945)

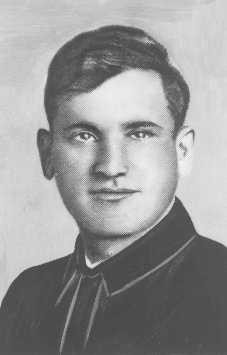
- Bielski c. 1941
- Born: 1908
- Died: February 1945 (aged 36–37)
- Known for: Bielski partisans
- Parent(s): David and Beila Bielski
- Relatives: Tuvia Bielski, brother Alexander Zeisal Bielski, brother Aron Bielski, brother

Asael Bielski (/ˈɑːsɔɪl/ AH-soyl; 1908 – February 1945) was the second-in-command of the Bielski partisans during World War II. He and his brothers were commanding the partisan unit deep in Belarusian forests, where they fought back against Nazi forces while prioritizing the rescue of fellow Jews. He was killed in the Battle of Königsberg in February 1945

== Early life ==
Asael was the fifth son of David and Beila Bielski, who had a total of twelve children: ten boys and two girls. He was two years younger than his brother Tuvia, who later commanded the Bielski Otriad. The Bielskis were the only Jewish family of Stankiewicze, a small village in pre-war Poland, currently Western Belarus. It was located between Lida and Navahrudak (called Nowogródek in Polish), both of which later housed Jewish ghettos during World War II. He was quieter and more reserved than his brothers, and was content to stay on the farm and around those he knew well.

With his older brothers leaving home and his father's health deteriorating, Asael became the new head of the household. As the male leader of the family, he had to arrange the marriage of his sister Tajba to an upper-class man named Avremale.

Avremale had a sister named Chaja, who was a high school graduate, which was rare for the time and place. Hearing that Asael needed help with bookkeeping, Chaja offered to tutor him.

== World War II ==
When Operation Barbarossa broke out, Tuvia, Zus and Asael were called up by their army units to fight against the Nazi German occupiers. Owing to so much chaos the units disbanded and they returned to Stankiewicze, where their parents lived. In early July 1941, a German army unit arrived in Stankiewicze, and Jewish residents were moved into a ghetto in Nowogródek.

After Operation Barbarossa, Asael and two of his brothers, Tuvia and Zus, went into hiding in nearby forests.

Before joining them, Chaja had lived in a ghetto at first, then fled, leaving her boyfriend there. She lived in an underground hiding spot near the home of a Christian peasant, along with her two nephews. Asael and Chaja were married shortly before the war's end.

After the Soviet occupation of the area, Asael was drafted into the Soviet Red Army, and six months later he was killed in the Battle of Königsberg in February 1945. He never lived to see his daughter Assaela, who he had fathered with Chaja (1922–2017). Assaela now works as a journalist and was married to Israeli luthier Amnon Weinstein.

== In film ==
In the film Defiance (2008), Asael (portrayed by British actor Jamie Bell) is the third of four brothers and seems to be about 20 years of age, or perhaps younger. In actuality, Asael was about 33 years of age (born in 1908) at the time of the invasion and was older than Zus (born in 1912), which is contrary to the relationship depicted in the film.

The film has been criticised in Poland due to its complete omission of all Polish aspects in the narrative, even though the setting is on territory that was part of Poland before the war and inhabited by a large number of ethnic Poles. Specifically, Tuvia was a veteran of the Polish army, and other Polish partisans were also active in the forests of present-day Belarus, but the film only presents the roles of Jews, Russians, and Germans. There was also controversy about the alleged involvement of the Bielski group in a massacre of Polish civilians conducted by Soviet-aligned partisans in Naliboki. The Bielski partisan group was the subject of an official inquiry by the Polish Institute of National Remembrance's Commission for the Prosecution of Crimes against the Polish Nation after witnesses testified that Bielski partisans were among the perpetrators of the Naliboki massacre; however, the investigation found no conclusive evidence linking the Bielski group to the crime.
