= Soviet partisans in Poland =

Left-wing partisan movements in Poland during World War II

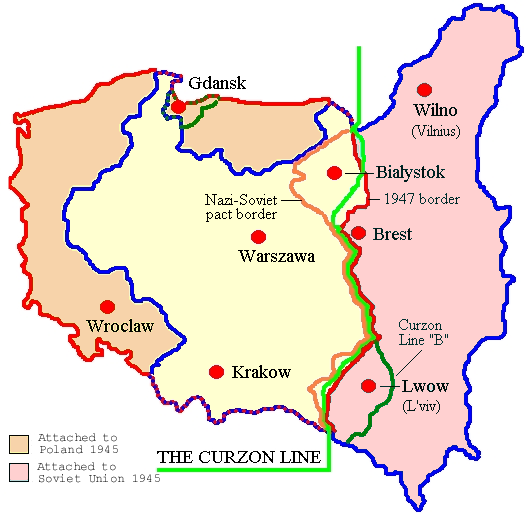
1939-1945 border changes. Orange line depicts the extent of areas occupied by Soviet Union in 1939-1941

Poland was invaded and annexed by Nazi Germany and the Soviet Union in the aftermath of the invasion of Poland in 1939. In the pre-war Polish territories annexed by the Soviets (modern-day western Ukraine, Western Belarus, Lithuania and Białystok regions, known to Poles as "Kresy") the first Soviet partisan groups were formed in 1941, soon after Operation Barbarossa, the German invasion of the Soviet Union. Those groups fought against the Germans, but conflicts with Polish partisans were also common.

== Early war ==
Initially the Soviet partisan groups were formed primarily in the areas of Nowogródek (modern Navahrudak), Lida and Wilno (modern Vilnius) from Red Army soldiers who evaded capture by the advancing German forces. Lacking support from the local population, the Soviet partisan groups retreated to various large forest complexes in the area, where they hid from the German rear and anti-partisan units.

There were also Soviet-affiliated and controlled groups, namely Gwardia Ludowa, later transformed into Armia Ludowa, which while often described as parts of the Polish resistance, were de facto controlled by Soviets, and as such can also be seen as extensions of the Soviet partisans. By the end of July 1944 (when much of Poland had been occupied by the Red Army) Armia Ludowa had some 20,000–30,000 members, 5,000 of them being Soviet nationals.

Until early 1943, the Soviet partisans focused primarily on survival deep behind enemy lines, with their activity limited mostly to sabotage and diversion rather than armed struggle against German forces and collaborationist police units. During this early period various Soviet partisan groups also collaborated with the local Polish resistance of ZWZ, later renamed the AK. The Polish underground was established in the area in the fall 1939. Polish resistance was both anti-Nazi and anti-Soviet; their attitude represented the fact that both powers had invaded Poland, and Polish citizens suffered from Soviet terror just as they did from Nazi terror.

== Late war ==
As the eastern front approached the area, and diplomatic relations between the Polish government in exile and the Soviet Union were broken off in the aftermath of the discovery of the Katyn Massacre in April 1943, most of the collaboration between Polish and Soviet partisans came to an end. In addition, as ordered by Moscow on June 22, 1943, Soviet partisans began an open conflict against both the German forces and local Polish partisans.

Soviet partisans attacked Polish partisans, villages and small towns in order to weaken the Polish structures in the areas which Soviet Union claimed for itself. Frequent requisitions of food in local villages and brutal reprisal actions against villages considered disloyal to the Soviet Union sparked the creation of numerous self-defence units, often joining the ranks of the Armia Krajowa. Similar assaults on the Polish resistance organizations also took place in Ukraine. Communist propaganda called the Polish resistance the "bands of White Poles", or "the protégés of the Gestapo." On 23 June 1943 the Soviet leaders ordered the partisans to denounce Polish partisan to the Nazis. The Soviet units were authorized to “shoot the [Polish] leaders” and “discredit, disarm, and dissolve” their units. Under pretences of cooperation, two sizable Polish partisan units were led to their destruction (a common strategy involved inviting the Polish commanders to negotiations, arresting or murdering them and attacking the Polish partisans by surprise).

In late 1943, the actions of Soviet partisans, who were ordered to liquidate the AK forces resulted in very limited and uneasy cooperation between some units of the AK and the Germans. While the AK treated the Germans as the enemy and continued to conduct operations against them, when the Germans offered the AK some arms and provisions to be used against the Soviet partisans, some Polish units in the Nowogródek and Wilno areas decided to accept them. However any such arrangements were purely tactical and did not constitute evidence of the type of ideological collaboration as was shown by the Vichy regime in France, the Quisling regime in Norway or closer to the region, the Organization of Ukrainian Nationalists. The Poles' main motivation was to gain intelligence on German morale and preparedness, and to acquire some badly needed weapons. There are no known joint Polish-German military actions, and the Germans were unsuccessful in their attempts to turn the Poles toward fighting exclusively against Soviet partisans. Such cooperation of local Polish commanders with the Germans was condemned by the AK High Command and the Polish Supreme Commander in London, who on January 17, 1944, ordered it to be discontinued and the guilty parties disciplined.

The armed struggle continued until the arrival of the Red Army in 1944 and well after. Subsequently, over the period of the next few years, the Soviets and Polish communists would work to successfully eradicate the remains of the anti-Soviet Polish underground, known as the cursed soldiers.

== Relations with the civilian population ==
Outside pre-1939 Soviet territories, Soviet partisans encountered little support and often significant hostility from local populations, and so unable to acquire supplies from otherwise, they engaged in plunder and terrorised the inhabitants. In some cases, Germans allowed peasants to form self-defense units against Soviet raids, which in extreme cases led to violent clashes between the Soviet partisans and local peasants, resulting in civilian casualties, as was the case with the Koniuchy massacre in Polish-Lithuanian borderland in 1944. Bogdan Musial argued that the Soviet partisans preferred to assault the less challenging Belarusian and Polish self-defense units rather than German military and police targets.

By the end of 1943, the Soviets could claim a significant victory in what they called their war against the bourgeois Poles: most large landed estates owned by the Poles had been destroyed by the Soviet partisans.

== See also ==
- Bielski partisans
- Jewish partisans
- Koniuchy massacre
- Lithuanian partisans (1941)
- Naliboki massacre
