= For Those in Peril =

For Those in Peril is a line from the hymn Eternal Father, Strong to Save. It may also refer to:

- For Those in Peril (1944 film), a British war film by Charles Crichton
- For Those in Peril (2013 film), a British drama film by Paul Wright
