= Defiance (2008 film) =

2008 film directed by Edward Zwick

- Theatrical release poster
- Directed by: Edward Zwick
- Written by: Clayton Frohman; Edward Zwick
- Based on: Defiance: The Bielski Partisans by Nechama Tec
- Produced by: Edward Zwick; Pieter Jan Brugge
- Starring: Daniel Craig; Liev Schreiber; Jamie Bell; Alexa Davalos; Allan Corduner; Mark Feuerstein
- Cinematography: Eduardo Serra
- Edited by: Steven Rosenblum
- Music by: James Newton Howard
- Production companies: Paramount Vantage; Bedford Falls Productions; Grosvenor Park Productions
- Distributed by: Paramount Pictures (North America); Essential Entertainment (International)
- Release date: December 31, 2008
- Running time: 137 minutes
- Country: United States
- Languages: English; Russian
- Budget: $32 million
- Box office: $51.2 million

Defiance is a 2008 American epic war film directed by Edward Zwick and starring Daniel Craig as Tuvia Bielski, Liev Schreiber as Zus Bielski, Jamie Bell as Asael Bielski, and George MacKay as Aron Bielski. Set during the occupation of Belarus by Nazi Germany, the film's screenplay by Clayton Frohman and Zwick was based on Nechama Tec's 1993 book Defiance: The Bielski Partisans, an account of the eponymous group led by Belarusian Jewish brothers, who saved and recruited Jews in Belarus during World War II.

The film was released in select theaters in the United States on December 31, 2008, followed by general release worldwide in January 2009.

== Plot ==
In the late summer of 1941, several weeks into Nazi Germany's invasion of the USSR, Einsatzgruppen follow the advancing German forces and systematically exterminate the Jewish population. Among the Jewish survivors not confined to German-enforced ghettoes are the Bielski brothers: Tuvia the eldest, Zus, Asael and Aron. When their parents are killed by local Schutzmannschaft under German orders, the brothers flee to the Naliboki forest, where they form a resistance band with other Jewish escapees. Tuvia kills the Schutzmannschaft chief responsible for his parents' deaths and Zus learns of the death of his wife and child from other Jewish escapees.

Over the next year, a growing number of Jewish refugees join the Bielskis. Tuvia decrees that everyone must work and that pregnancies are forbidden. Their group forages from local farms and raid the Germans and their collaborators, moving their camp whenever discovered. Mounting casualties cause Tuvia to reconsider their tactics and minimize the loss of Jewish lives, while Zus favours more aggressive operations. As winter approaches, the disagreement between the two eldest brothers comes to a head, and Zus departs with several of his followers to join a local company of Soviet partisans while Tuvia remains to lead the Jewish camp. The partisans agree to protect the Jewish camp in exchange for supplies. Zus confronts Commander Panchenko about antisemitism within his ranks after one of his men is assaulted for using the Russian latrine. Asael and Chaya are married in the forest.

Sickness and starvation in Tuvia's group leads to growing discontent and an attempted mutiny that forces Tuvia to sacrifice his horse to feed his people. Arkady assaults Asael and declares himself leader, but is shot and killed by Tuvia. Tuvia learns one of the ladies is hiding a pregnancy but Lilka convinces him not to kick her out because the woman was raped by the Nazis. A German prisoner reveals the enemy plans to attack in force on Passover and an angry mob beats him to death. The Soviet partisans decide to retreat eastward, but Zus is unwilling to comply with their orders to accompany them. Tuvia's group, planning to evacuate the camp the day before Passover, is bombed by Luftwaffe Stukas. Asael leads a rear guard delaying action which leaves only Asael and one other fighter alive. They rejoin the main body whose path is blocked by a marsh. They cross with only one casualty, to be attacked by a German platoon supported by a Panzer III tank. Unable to withstand the heavy German firepower, they're saved by Zus and his force, who have deserted the partisans to rejoin the Jewish group.

The epilogue's intertitles state that the Bielski partisans lived in the forest for another two years, growing to number 1,200 Jews, building a hospital, a nursery, and a school. Asael was killed in action with the Red Army six months later. Zus, Tuvia, and Aron emigrated to the United States after the war and formed a small trucking business in New York City. The Bielski brothers never sought recognition and the descendants of the people they saved now number tens of thousands.

== Cast ==
- Daniel Craig as Tuvia Bielski
- Liev Schreiber as Zus Bielski
- Jamie Bell as Asael Bielski
- George MacKay as Aron Bielski
- Alexa Davalos as Lilka Ticktin, a Polish refugee and Tuvia's love interest
- Allan Corduner as Shimon Haretz, the brothers' old schoolteacher
- Mark Feuerstein as Isaac Malbin, an intellectual and magazine writer
- Tomas Arana as Ben Zion Gulkowitz, a resistance leader
- Jacek Koman as Konstanty "Kościk" Kozłowski
- Mia Wasikowska as Chaya Dziencielsky, Asael's love interest
- Iben Hjejle as Bella, Zus's love interest
- Jodhi May as Tamara Skidelski, a cousin of the Bielskis who had been raped by a Nazi soldier
- Kate Fahy as Riva Reich
- Iddo Goldberg as Yitzhak Shulman
- Sam Spruell as Arkady Lubczanski, a Jewish refugee and known bully
- Ravil Isyanov as Viktor Panchenko, a Soviet partisan commander
- Rolandas Boravskis as Gramov, the second-in-command of the Soviet partisans
- Kristina Skokova as Red Haired Woman
- Mark Margolis as Jewish Elder

== Production ==
Zwick began writing a script for Defiance in 1999 after acquiring film rights to Tec's book. He developed the project under the banner of his production company Bedford Falls Productions, and the project was financed by the London-based company Grosvenor Park Productions with a budget of $32 million.

Paramount Vantage acquired the rights to distribute Defiance in the United States and Canada.

In May 2007, Daniel Craig was cast in the lead role. The following August, Schreiber, Bell, Davalos, and Arana were cast. Production began in early September 2007 so that Craig could complete filming Defiance in time for reprising his role as James Bond in Quantum of Solace.

Defiance was filmed in three months in Lithuania, just across the border from Belarus. Co-producer Pieter Jan Brugge felt the shooting locations, between 150 and 200 kilometres from the actual sites, lent authenticity to the film; some local extras were descendants of the Jewish families rescued by the Bielski partisans.

== Reception ==
=== Box office ===
Defiance made $128,000 during its two weeks of limited release in New York City and Los Angeles. It made $10 million during its first weekend of wide release in the United States.

By the end of its box office run, the film made approximately $52 million worldwide.

=== Critical response ===
On the review aggregator website Rotten Tomatoes, 58% of 187 critics' reviews are positive, with an average rating of 5.9/10. The website's consensus reads: "Professionally made but artistically uninspired, Ed Zwick's story of Jews surviving WWII in the Belarus forest lacks the emotional punch of the actual history." Metacritic, which uses a weighted average, assigned the film a score of 58 out of 100, based on 34 critics, indicating "mixed or average" reviews.

Critic A. O. Scott of The New York Times called the film "stiff, musclebound". He said Zwick "wields his camera with a heavy hand, punctuating nearly every scene with emphatic nods, smiles or grimaces as the occasion requires. His pen is, if anything, blunter still, with dialogue that crashes down on the big themes like a blacksmith's hammer". Scott also said the film unfairly implied that "if only more of the Jews living in Nazi-occupied Europe had been as tough as the Bielskis, more would have survived". The review adds that "in setting out to overturn historical stereotypes of Jewish passivity ...(the film) ends up affirming them." Zwick responded: "It is a tribute to honor and luck, and to help other people escape it is an honor. But the fact that you don't escape it is not a negative verdict on your honor."

The New Yorker critic David Denby praised the film, saying: "it makes instant emotional demands, and those who respond to it, as I did, are likely to go all the way and even come out of it feeling slightly stunned." Denby also praised the cast's performances, which he described as "a kind of realistic fairy tale set in a forest newly enchanted by the sanctified work of staying alive."

=== Accolades ===
On January 22, 2009, the film received a nomination for an Academy Award in the category of Best Original Score for its soundtrack by James Newton Howard.

Defiance was also nominated for the Golden Globe Award for Best Original Score for 2008.

== Controversies about historical inaccuracies ==
In one of the film's scenes, it is stated that there may be an epidemic of typhus amongst the Bielski partisans and that ampicillin is needed for treating the infection, which is historically inaccurate, because ampicillin was not discovered until 1958.

A review by Armchair General magazine cited the book Women in the Holocaust by Dalia Ofer and Lenore Weitzman, to argue that in reality the Bielskis were less egalitarian than suggested by the film, and that "the fighters had the first pick among women for sexual partners." Zwick responded to the criticism by saying that Defiance is not a simple fight between good and evil. He told The Times: "The Bielskis weren't saints. They were flawed heroes, which is what makes them so real and so fascinating. They faced any number of difficult moral dilemmas that the movie seeks to dramatise: Does one have to become a monster to fight monsters? Does one have to sacrifice his humanity to save humanity?"

Nechama Tec, on whose book the film is based, stated in an interview with Rzeczpospolita that she was initially shocked by the film, especially by the intense battle scenes including combat with a German tank. These never occurred in reality as the partisans tried to avoid open combat and were focused on survival. She explained the treatment of historical events in the film as a concession made by its director and producers in order to make the film more thrilling and to obtain the necessary funding from Hollywood. Nevertheless, after seeing the film a number of times, Tec said that she was liking it "more and more". Zwick said Adolf Hitler had sent two German divisions into the forest to search for the partisans, but they were unable to locate them.

=== Poland ===
The Times and The Guardian reported that Poles feel that "Hollywood has airbrushed out some unpleasant episodes from the story", such as the Bielski partisans' alleged affiliation with Soviet partisans directed by the NKVD, who committed atrocities against Poles in eastern Poland, including the region where the Bielski group operated. Gazeta Wyborcza reported six months before the film's release that "News about a movie glorifying [the Bielskis] have caused an uproar among Polish historians", who referred to the Bielskis as "Jewish-Communist bandits". The newspaper commented that it "departed from the truth on several occasions", including depicting pre-war Nowogrodek as a Belarusian town where "no one speaks Polish", "there are only good Soviet partisans and bad Germans", and "Polish partisans are missing from the film altogether".

According to The Guardian, the movie was booed at some cinemas and banned from others due to a "local perception that it is a rewriting of history and anti-Polish". On March 11, 2009, the Polish Embassy in London disputed the report, stating: "This embassy has been in touch with Defiance's only distributor in Poland, Monolith Plus, and we have been told that this film has not experienced any form of booing, let alone been banned by any cinemas." The wave of criticism against the film led to charges that the anger was fueled by antisemitism.

=== Belarus ===
Most reviewers from Belarus criticized the film for a complete absence of the Belarusian language and for the Soviet partisans singing a Belarusian folk song while in actuality they would have more likely been singing Russian songs.

"The word Belarusian is spoken out only three times in the movie", the newspaper Komsomolskaya Pravda v Belorussii wrote. Veterans of the Soviet partisan resistance in Belarus criticised the film for inaccuracies.

Some Belorussian reviews, as in Poland, criticised the film for ignoring the Bielski partisans' crimes against the local population.

== See also ==
- List of Holocaust films
- Rescue of Jews by Poles during the Holocaust
- In Darkness, 2011 Polish film dramatising Leopold Socha, a sewage worker in the then Polish city of Lwów, who sheltered Jews in the city's sewer system
- Koniuchy massacre
- Naliboki massacre
