= Naliboki forest =

Forest in Belarus

Coordinates: 53°53′04″N 26°26′33″E

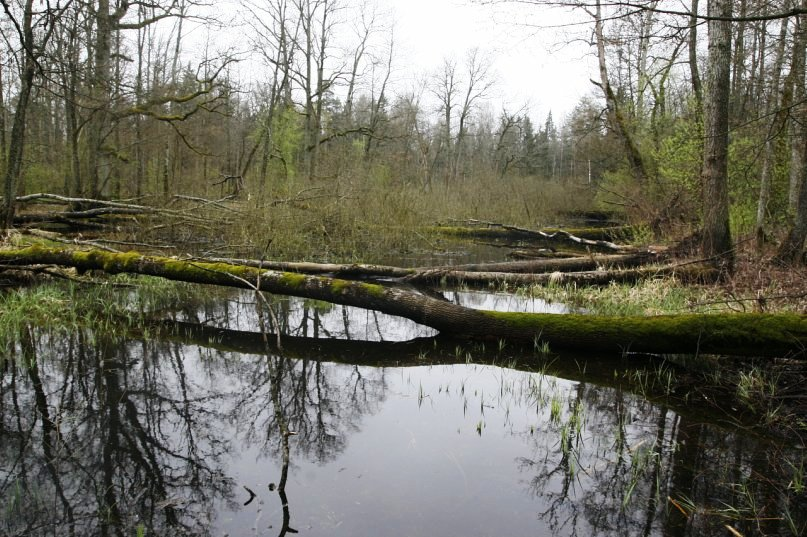
Early spring in Naliboki Forest

Naliboki Forest (Belarusian: Налібоцкая пушча, Nalibotskaya Pushcha; Russian: Налибокская пуща, Nalibokskaya Pushcha) (pushcha: wild forest, primeval forest)) is a large forest complex in northwestern Belarus, on the right bank of the Neman River, on the Belarusian Ridge. Much of the area is occupied by pine forests and swamps, and some parts of the Naliboki are rather hilly. Rich fauna include deer, wild boars, elk, beavers, bears, bison, capercaillie, black grouse, snipes etc. The forest is named after a small town of Naliboki situated in the middle of it, although the title of "informal capital of the forest" belongs rather to the town of Ivyanets.

Nalibotskaya Pushcha is famous for its nature and rich, although tragic, history.

== History ==
From the 10th to the 11th century, although very scarcely populated, the big forest on the right bank of upper Neman River was strategically important for the pagan Lithuanian tribes. Historical Belarusian (then Ruthenian) towns Minsk and Zaslawye were founded on the edge of the forest as fortresses to defend the Ruthenian frontier against Lithuanian forays. In the middle of the 13th century, the forest defended the Grand Duchy of Lithuania in the south from the attacks of the Golden Horde and its vassal, the principality of Halych-Volhynia, thus helping the newly formed state to survive. The border between Ruthenia (which remained under the Golden Horde power) and Lithuania that was established as a result of this clash, left traces in the local legends about the battles with Tartars at Mahilna and Koydanava and predetermined the long lasting division of the Grand Duchy of Lithuania to Lithuania proper and “Lithuanian Russia”. As a result of the Union of Krewo (1385) and subsequent Christianization of Lithuania in 1387, local pagans were converted to Catholicism, and the area stayed predominantly Catholic until today. The long-term clash of Russian Orthodox and Polish-Lithuanian Catholic identities in the Naliboki Forest lasted until recent times, as exemplified in such prominent 20th century figures as Felix Dzerzhinsky, or many heroes of Catholic resistance both to Nazi and Soviet regimes.

In the second half of the 16th century, most of the Naliboki Forest had been concentrated in the hands of the powerful Radziwill family, serving partly as their hunting grounds, but also as a rich source of timber and grade iron ore from a local pre-industrial foundry, produced mostly for export. In the 18th century, Hanna Radziwill (née Sanguszko) founded such famous enterprises as the glass factory in the town of Nalibaki and the porcelain factory in Sverzhan as well as patronising the ceramic workshops in Rakau.

Traces of Lithuanian culture, at least in toponymics and personal names, survive until today. For instance, the name Ivyanets, originally Givenech, derives from Lithuanian gyventi – “to live”, and Pershai – from piršlys – matchmaker. A few Lithuanian-speaking communities were still present in the deep forest until the early 19th century, but by the middle of the 19th century, the area became predominantly “Belarusian”-speaking (although the very term “Belarusian” was completely unknown to local Catholics until the early 20th century).

Moreover, this area, together with the adjacent territories of the historical Lithuania, became a cradle of the new Belarusian literary tradition in the second half of the 19th century. Its pioneer, Vintsent Dunin-Martsinkyevich (Polish: Wincenty Dunin-Marcinkiewicz) for most of his life owned a small village of Lucynka, where he permanently resided as of the early 1860s, and where most of his literary works were written. The older generation of inhabitants of Naliboki still speaks almost standard literary Belarusian, although many of them consider themselves Polish. The first person to call himself “Belarusian”, Salomon Rysiński, spent much of his life in the town of Lubcha at the western brink of the Naliboki Forest. After World War II, the only Catholic priest in Belarus who served in the Belarusian language was Father Charniauski from Vishneva.

=== World War II ===
During World War II, the Naliboki Forest hosted many thousands of those who escaped from Nazi terror and formed partisan troops – Soviet, Jewish and Polish as well as criminals without any political ideals. The estimated number of armed troops in the forest varies from 10 to 25 thousand. Relations between them were not easy: in specific, on May 8, 1943, the Naliboki massacre occurred, and an estimated 128 local citizens were killed by Soviet partisans. In June 1943, the town of Ivyanets was liberated for a short while from the Nazis by the partisans of the Polish Home Army, supported by Soviet partisans. Nazi "pacification" action in response, known as Operation Hermann, in July 1943, employed about 52,000 armed troops which devastated most of the villages and towns of the forest. Tens of thousands of the local people were killed or driven to Germany for forced labour. Operation Hermann was targeted especially against the Catholic resistance, and in particular, Franciscan friars Józef Achilles Puchała and Karol Herman Stępień, beatified by Pope John Paul II in 1999, were tortured to death by the Nazis. Most of the partisans, however, managed to escape the Nazi blockade. Starting in autumn 1943, after the Naliboki massacre, relations between Polish and Soviet partisans became openly hostile.

During the Second World War, Jewish partisan leaders Bielski brothers (see also Defiance (2008 film)) operated from the Naliboki forest.

Naliboki Forest with its surroundings is one of the few regions of Belarus which to some extent has preserved certain features of pre-Soviet and pre-Russian (“Slavonic Lithuanian”) culture.
