= Joseph Serchuk =

Polish partisan

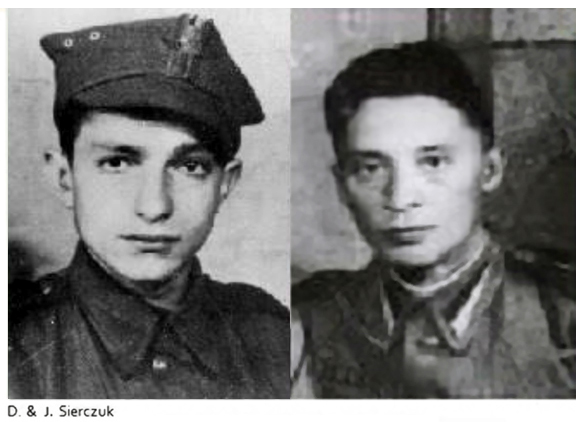
Brothers Sierczuk, David (left) and Josef (right) in post-War Poland

Joseph (Yozhik) Serchuk (Hebrew: יוסף סרצ'וק) born Józef Serczuk or Josef Sierczuk (Chełm, 1919 – 6 November 1993, Tel Aviv) was the leader of a Jewish partisan unit in the Lublin area of occupied Poland during the Holocaust. After World War II, he testified at trials of the Nazis, and received special recognition from the State of Israel.

== Biography ==
After his parents and other family members were killed in the ghetto in 1941, Joseph and his brother David were taken to Sobibor extermination camp. After one day in the camp, he fled with his brother to the nearest forest, and together with other survivors founded the core of a partisan group. During the war, the group was led by Jews who had escaped from nearby ghettos and from Sobibor. The group also included the postwar writer Dov Freiberg.

We continued forward and soon we saw a small house in front of us. Because of all the snow that had built up around it, it seemed very low in the ground. In front of it was a half-destroyed low awning, without doors, and half its roofing missing. ...The door opened and Jurziek was swallowed up inside. He sat there for ages, it seemed. At last, when our patience was exhausted, he reappeared with a broad smile on his face. “I've found us an excellent hiding place,” he said. “there are two women here with a small baby girl. They are very poor and they've nothing to eat. ... In order to counteract the rumours spreading through the area, about us, we decided to spread one of our own. It became known that a partisan headquarters was based in the house and anyone who said a word about it was endangering his own life and that of his family. But the rumours about us spread very quickly. Strange and different stories were heard about the house - there were those who had seen whole 'platoons' of partisans coming and going throughout the night, and around the house guards armed with machine-guns; there were those who had seen people get to close to the house and simply disappear. People became afraid to get too close, and those whose path perforce took them in the vicinity, made a wide detour, rather than tempt providence.

After the war, Joseph took part in locating the fleeing Nazi war criminals in Europe and served as a witness in the Nuremberg Trials. He joined communist forces in Poland under the Soviet military control (pictured). In 1950, Serchuk obtained a passport and went to Israel. Immediately upon arriving in Israel, he was drafted as a soldier to the Israeli army. After service, he married, settled in Yad Eliyahu in Tel Aviv, and opened a business.

Serchuk travelled to Europe several times to testify in the trials of former Nazis including that of Oberscharführer Hugo Raschendorfer. Raschendorfer admitted to participating in several mass executions in Nazi-occupied Chełm, and was convicted of murdering an additional number of Jews on his own volition. After Raschendorfer was convicted and sentenced to life imprisonment, Serchuk was awarded a special award from the Nazi Crimes Investigation Department of the Israel Police.

In 1967, Levi Eshkol, the Israeli Prime Minister, gave him the Fighters against Nazis Medal, and in 1968, Serchuk received in addition the State Fighters Medal. Serchuk saw the establishment and strengthening of the Israel Defense Forces and the State of Israel as retribution against the Nazis who slaughtered all of his extended family.

Serchuk died in 1993 in Tel Aviv, at the age of 74.
