= Simcha Zorin =

Shalom (Simcha) Zorin (Hebrew: שלום זורין 1902–1974) was a Jewish Soviet partisan commander in Minsk.

== Life ==
Many Jewish partisans in Byelorussia had their own units that operated as part of the general Soviet partisan movement and the overall Jewish resistance movement, although some of these Jewish units lost their Jewish character over time. The Zorin unit, led by Simcha-Shalom Zorin, included 800 Jews.

The Germans invaded Minsk in late June 1941 and transferred the city's Jews, Zorin included, to a ghetto. Zorin worked in a local prisoner of war camp, where he met a captured Soviet officer named Semyon Ganzenko. In late 1941, Zorin and Ganzenko escaped to the forests in the Staroe Selo region, about 19 miles southwest of Minsk. While hiding in the forest, the two established a partisan unit called Parkhomenko. The unit consisted of 150 members, including many Jews. As more and more Jews joined the Parkhomenko unit, many conflicts arose between the Jewish and non-Jewish fighters.

Zorin had about 100 fighters in his combat unit. Some were members of the Socialist-Zionist youth movement Hashomer Hatzair ("The Young Guard") who had escaped the Biała Podlaska ghetto.

In July 1944, Simcha Zorin was wounded in his leg during a battle with a retreating German unit; seven of his men were killed.

In 1971, some 25 years after the war, Simcha Zorin emigrated to Israel.

== See also ==
- Jewish partisans
