= Shalom Yoran =

Shalom Yoran (Hebrew: שָׁלוֹם יוֹרָן; June 29, 1925 – September 9, 2013) was a survivor of the Holocaust and a former Jewish partisan. His World War II memoir, The Defiant. A True Story of Jewish Vengeance and Survival, was first published in 1996.

Shalom Yoran was born Selim Sznycer in Raciąż, Poland.

== Second world war ==
The Nazi Germans invaded Poland in 1939 when he was fourteen. His family fled eastwards into Polish areas annexed by the Soviet Union, after the Soviet invasion of Poland, but in 1941 the Germans invaded the USSR and caught up with the Sznycer family in the small village of Kurzeniec.

On September 9, 1942, the Jewish community of Kurzeniec was "liquidated". The Einsatzgruppen, assisted by Ukrainian, Lithuanian and Latvian auxiliary units and some locals, dragged 1,040 Jews, including Selim's parents, from their homes, hideouts and the synagogue, then systematically murdered and burned them. Only a few, including Selim and his older brother Musio, managed to hide in a barn of a sympathetic peasant Ignalia Biruk and later escape to the forest. Later he recalled:

Before being separated from my mother, she told me, "Go fight... try to save yourselves, avenge our death, and tell the world what happened." These are the words that guided me through that dark period, what gave me strength to fight, and what inspires me to share my story today.

In the woods, they found a disorganized group of about 150 Jewish escapees from nearby ghettos, Nazi concentration camps and Nazi atrocities. Five of them spent the harsh winter of 1942–1943 in a dugout zemlyanka they built themselves in the swamps near Lake Naroch. Without previous experience in construction, they built based on what they could remember from books such as Robinson Crusoe and common sense. They stocked up the food - mostly potatoes - by begging and stealing from local peasants. In the spring they returned to find that fewer than 50 Jews from the original group survived Nazi round ups.

They located a partisan unit, but were not allowed to join because they lacked weapons, according to a common partisan practice. A commander of another unit offered them a condition to join: they had to blow up a Nazi gunstock factory in Kurzeniec. The building was well guarded but they succeeded nevertheless. Upon their return, they learned that the partisans did not expect them to return from the mission and did not intend to let them in, because they were Jewish.

Together with fellow escapees, they formed an all-Jewish unit in the forests and swamplands of Western Belarus. Against all odds, they survived, acquired some guns and fought back the Germans and their collaborators. Later they joined a unit of the Soviet partisans and waged guerilla warfare against the retreating German troops, ambushed convoys, blew up bridges and railroads and derailed German trains.

In 1944, Belarus was liberated by the Soviet Union and Jewish partisans were drafted into the Red Army. Later some of them were allowed to join the Soviet-controlled Polish Army.

== Postwar ==
After the end of the war, they illegally crossed a number of European borders to Italy, where Selim illegally worked for the British Army.

In 1946, he made his way to the British Mandate of Palestine using false identification to evade the limitations imposed on the Jewish immigration by the British White Paper of 1939. While recovering in a hospital following surgery, he recorded his wartime experiences in Polish and put the notebooks away.

He assumed the name of a deceased cousin in order to obtain an identity card. Later he joined the newly formed Israeli Air Force for many years. Later he played a major role in developing Israeli Aircraft Industries (IAI), eventually serving as IAI's Senior Vice President.

Shalom Yoran was a founding board member of the Museum of Jewish Heritage in New York City and a governor of Tel Aviv University. He was a chairman of a commercial aircraft company in Long Island.

== Publication of wartime memoir ==
In 1991, he found his old manuscript and in 2003 published his wartime memoir. He dedicated the book to his parents. He died on 9 September 2013 in New York.

== See also ==
- Occupation of Belarus by Nazi Germany
