= Nechama Tec =

Polish-American historian (1931–2023)

- Born: Nechama Bawnik; 15 May 1931; Lublin, Poland
- Died: 3 August 2023 (aged 92); New York City, New York, U.S.
- Education: Columbia University
- Spouse: Leon Tec (m.1919–2013; his death)

Nechama Tec (née Bawnik, 15 May 1931 – 3 August 2023) was a Polish-American historian who was professor emerita of Sociology at the University of Connecticut. She received her Ph.D. in sociology at Columbia University, where she studied and worked with the sociologist Daniel Bell, and was a Holocaust scholar. Her book When Light Pierced the Darkness (1986) and her memoir Dry Tears: The Story of a Lost Childhood (1984) both received the Merit of Distinction Award from the Anti-Defamation League of B'nai B'rith. She is also the author of the book Defiance: The Bielski Partisans on which the film Defiance (2008) is based, as well as a study of women in the Holocaust. She was awarded the 1994 International Anne Frank Special Recognition prize for it.

== Biography ==
Nechama Tec was born in Lublin, Poland to a family of Polish Jews in 1931 and was 8 years old when Nazi Germany invaded Poland in 1939. She survived the Holocaust thanks to her life being saved by Polish Catholics. After the war she emigrated to Israel and later moved to the United States, where she earned a doctorate at Columbia University.

Tec was the mother of film director Roland Tec. Her daughter, Leora Tec, is the founder and Director of Bridge To Poland, an organization she created to break down stereotypes between Jews and non-Jewish Poles. Her husband, Dr. Leon Tec, was a noted child psychiatrist and author of Fear of Success and the autobiography, Adventure and Destiny.

Nechama Tec was initially shocked by the changes made in adapting her book to make the film Defiance. The Bielski partisans, for example, never actually went into battle against German tanks. However, after seeing the film a number of times, she confessed to liking it "more and more."

Tec was appointed to the Council of the United States Holocaust Memorial Museum and served in 1995 as a Scholar in Residence at the International Institute for Holocaust Research at Yad Vashem, in Israel.

Nechama Tec died in New York City on 3 August 2023, at the age of 92.

== Works ==
- Resistance: Jews and Christians Who Defied the Nazi Terror. University Press: Oxford 2013.
- Letters of Hope and Despair. University Press: Cambridge 2007.
- Resilience and Courage: Women, Men, and the Holocaust. University Press: Yale 2003.
- Defiance: The Bielski Partisans. University Press: Oxford 1993.
- In The Lion's Den: The Life of Oswald Rufeisen. University Press: Oxford 1990.
- When Light Pierced the Darkness: Christian Rescue of Jews in Nazi-Occupied Poland. University Press: Oxford 1986.
- Dry Tears: The Story of a Lost Childhood. University Press: Oxford 1984.
- Grass Is Green in Suburbia: A Sociological Study of Adolescent Usage of Illicit Drugs. Libra Pub 1974.

== Lectures and articles ==
- Jewish Children: Between Protectors and Murderers. Center for Advanced Holocaust Studies - US Holocaust Memorial Museum: 2005.
- “Jewish Resistance: Fact, Omissions, and Distortions,”. Miles Lerman Center for the Study of Jewish Resistance. 1997.
- Tec, Nechama; Weiss, Daniel (Winter 1997). "A Historical Injustice: The Case of Masha Bruskina". Holocaust and Genocide Studies. 11 (3). Oxford Journals: 366–377. doi:10.1093/hgs/11.3.366.

== Awards ==
- 2002 National Jewish Book Award in the Holocaust category for Resilience and Courage: Women, Men and the Holocaust
- 2012 Prakhin International Literary Award "The Truth about Holocaust & Stalinist Repression" for the book Defiance: The Bielski Partisans.
