= Dov Freiberg =

Polish Holocaust survivor, writer

- Freiberg at the trials
- Born: 15 May 1927; Warsaw, Poland
- Died: 1 March 2008 (aged 80); Ramla, Israel
- Other names: Berek Freiberg
- Citizenship: Polish, Israeli
- Known for: Sobibor uprising

Dov Freiberg (15 May 1927 – 1 March 2008) born Berek Freiberg, was a Holocaust survivor, writer, and witness at the Eichmann trial and the Demjanjuk case. Freiberg was a prisoner at Sobibor extermination camp where he participated in the Sobibor uprising. After the revolt, he managed to escape into nearby woods and survived until the Soviet Army entered in July 1944.

== Biography ==
Dov Freiberg was born to Moses and Rebecca Freiberg in 1927 in Warsaw, Poland. The first years of his childhood were spent in the industrial city of Łódź, where his father was a factory worker. At the beginning of the Nazi occupation his father and brother tried to escape eastward, but his father was shot by the Germans when his convoy was attacked. A few months later his mother moved with her four children to her parents' house in Warsaw, which was situated in the ghetto that had been established in November 1940 in the heart of the Jewish Quarter. A year later, in autumn 1941, when conditions in the ghetto had worsened and tens of thousands of its residents had died or were killed, this spurred him to escape from the ghetto with the assistance of a smuggler; Freiberg escaped to the remote town Turobin in the district of Lublin, where the Jews, including the family of his father, lived with a sense of relative calm. On 17 May 1942, two days after his 15th birthday, the town was surrounded suddenly by the SS accompanied by local assistants and Ukrainians. Most of the town's Jews, along with the Jews of other nearby towns, were brutally deported to the Sobibor extermination camp.

=== Sobibor extermination camp ===
Upon Freiberg's arrival in Sobibor, some Jewish prisoners managed to squeeze into the group of slave laborers temporarily reprieved from their intended deaths in the gas chambers, and Freiberg was employed with other members of this group initially as a sorter of clothing and belongings. He was then forced to do other tasks including cutting the hair of the women before they went to the gas chambers. Freiberg managed to survive the regime of daily abuse, starvation and cruel treatment for about 17 months. In October 1943, Freiberg participated in the Sobibor prisoners' revolt and he managed to escape into nearby woods and joined Joseph Serchuk's Jewish partisan unit in the Lublin area of occupied Poland until the Soviet Army liberated the region in July 1944.

After the war, he moved to Łódź, Poland for a short period of time and from there moved to Germany. Once in Germany he joined a training group consisting of Holocaust survivors, where he met his future wife – Sarah, a refugee from the Soviet Union. This group tried to travel in the summer of 1947 on the ship Exodus to Mandate Palestine. The Exodus was captured by the British and sent back to Germany. In 1948, Freiberg together with the training group managed to settle in a kibbutz in the northern Sharon where he received military training and fought in the 1948 Arab–Israeli War. Freiberg then settled in Ramle, where he joined the army for military service and served as a sapper in the Engineering Corps. During his military service his daughters Rivkah and Yael were born.

Freiberg testified at 1961 at the Eichmann trial, where he told about the horrors of the extermination camp Sobibor. Four years later, in 1965, he was invited to Germany to testify at the trial in Hagen, where SS officers were tried for acts committed in Sobibor.

Freiberg was a popular lecturer, and he lectured frequently before students, soldiers, officers, and educational organisations for Holocaust studies. Freiberg went twice with youth delegations to Poland as a survivor. He was also invited by Israeli Prime Minister Yitzhak Rabin to formally participate in the official visit to Poland. Freiberg testified at the Demjanjuk trial in 1986 in Israel, testifying against Demjanjuk's release, claiming that he should be tried for his crimes at the Sobibor death camp. Freiberg's wife Sarah died at the end of 2007, and he died a few months later in March 2008 at the age of 79 (or 80) in Ramla, Israel.

== Books ==
Freiberg wrote four books including:

- Relic from Sobibor (in Hebrew: שריד מסוביבור), published in 1988, which tells his history from the outbreak of World War II, through the Holocaust, illegal immigration to Israel aboard the Exodus and up until the day of arrival in Israel. The book was a great success and was published in eight Hebrew editions, as well as in an English translation as To Survive Sobibor by Gefen Books.
- Journey to the Past with Gefen Shibolim was published in 1993 and describes his experiences with the campaign conducted by a group of high school students in 1991; the trip included a visit to Freiberg's first camp site Sobibor 48 years after his escaping from the camp.
- Be one person was published in 1996. It describes coping with life in Israel as a Holocaust survivor as well as his testimony at the Eichmann trial.
- Between Two Worlds was published in 2001. It describes the duality of his life between the world of the Holocaust and the world that followed after.
