= Bielski partisans =

Jewish partisan unit during World War II

Bielski Partisans
- Formation: Spring 1942
- Type: Underground organization
- Region served: German-occupied Poland (today Belarus)
- Leader: Bielski brothers (Tuvia, Alexander, Asael, Aron)

The Bielski partisans were a unit of Polish Jewish partisans who rescued Jews from extermination and fought the German occupiers and their collaborators around Novogrudok and Lida in German-occupied Poland (now western Belarus). The partisan unit was named after the Bielskis, a family of Polish Jews who organized and led the community.

The Bielski partisans spent more than two years living in the forest. By the end of the war they numbered as many as 1,236 members, most of whom were non-combatants, including children and the elderly. The Bielski partisans are seen by many Jews as heroes for having led as many refugees as they did away from the perils of war and the Holocaust. However, as their relations with the non-Jewish population were strained and occasionally violent, their wartime record has been the subject of some controversy in Poland.

== Background ==
Before World War II, the Bielski family had been millers and grocers in Stankiewicze (Stankievichy), near Novogrudok, an area that at the outbreak of the war belonged to Poland and in September 1939 was occupied by the Soviet Union (cf. Polish September Campaign and Soviet invasion of Poland (1939)) in accord with the Molotov–Ribbentrop Pact between Nazi Germany and the Soviet Union.

Before the war, Tuvia Bielski had received training in the Polish Army. After performing reserve duty, he engaged in trade, eventually becoming a smuggler.

Under the Soviet occupation of eastern Poland, the remainder of the Bielski family served as low-level administrators for the Soviets, with Tuvia Bielski becoming a commissar. This strained the Bielskis' relations with their neighbours, many of whom were subjected to Soviet repression.

During Operation Barbarossa, the German invasion of the Soviet Union beginning 22 June 1941, a Jewish ghetto was established within Novogrudok, as the Germans took over the area and implemented their genocidal policies (see Holocaust in Poland and Holocaust in Belarus).

== Partisans ==
=== Formation ===
The four Bielski brothers, Tuvia, Alexander (also known as "Zus"), Asael, and Aron, fled into the nearby forests after their parents and other family members had been killed in the ghetto on 8 December 1941. In the spring of 1942, together with 13 ghetto neighbors, they formed the nucleus of a partisan combat unit. The unit originally numbered some 40 people, but quickly grew.

The unit's commander was the oldest brother, Tuvia, who had served in the Polish Army from 1927 to 1929, rising to the rank of corporal. He had been interested in the Zionist youth movement. He sent emissaries to infiltrate the area's ghettos, recruiting new members to the unit, which was sheltering in the Naliboki forest. Hundreds of men, women, and children eventually found their way to the Bielski encampment; at its peak, the unit hosted 1,236 people, 70 per cent of them women, children and elderly; no one was turned away. About 150 people engaged in armed operations.

=== Organization ===
The partisans lived in underground dugouts (zemlyankas) or bunkers. In addition, several utility structures were built: a kitchen, a mill, a bakery, a bathhouse, a medical clinic for the sick and wounded and a quarantine hut for those who suffered from infectious diseases such as typhus. Herds of cows supplied milk. Artisans made goods and carried out repairs, providing the combatants with logistical support that later served the Soviet partisan units in the vicinity as well. More than 125 workers toiled in the workshops, which became famous among partisans far beyond the Bielski base. Tailors patched up old clothing and stitched together new garments; shoemakers fixed old and made new footwear; leather-workers laboured on belts, bridles and saddles. A metalworking shop established by Shmuel Oppenheim repaired damaged weapons and constructed new ones from spare parts. A tannery, constructed to produce the hide for cobblers and leather workers, became a de facto synagogue because several tanners were devout Hasidic Jews. Carpenters, hat-makers, barbers and watchmakers served their own community and guests. The camp's many children attended class in the dugout set up as a school. The camp even had its own jail and court of law.

Some accounts note the inequality between well-off partisans and poor inhabitants of the camp. According to one of Tuvia Bielski's cousins who lived in the camp, relayed to her daughter, women were forced to strip naked upon entry and give up their underwear as a form of "entry ticket".

=== Activities ===
The Bielski unit's partisans were primarily concerned with survival. Due to their poor equipment and training, they were not assigned main combat roles. Instead, its members operated field kitchens, hospitals, and bakeries and provided tailoring and cobbling services for Soviet soldiers. Their main task, though, was forced requisitioning of food and other supplies from the local population. The Bielski partisan group decided to prioritize saving Jews; Tuvia Bielski said "I would rather save one old Jewish woman than kill ten German soldiers".

The Bielski partisans' targets also included the Germans and their collaborators who had betrayed or killed Jews, such as Belarusian volunteer policemen and local inhabitants, as well as their families. In one case, the Bielski partisans killed some 12 people from a Belarusian family who had betrayed two Jewish girls to the Germans. In another, the Bielski partisans killed several collaborators whose names they extracted from Ivan Tzwirkes, a collaborator with a Jewish wife. They also conducted sabotage.

At the beginning of 1943 German planes dropped leaflets in the area promising a 50,000 Reichsmark reward for assistance in the capture of Tuvia Bielski; this figure was subsequently doubled to 100,000 RM. The leaflets, which were intended for the Christian population, also reached Jews and provided motivation and courage to attempt an escape to the forest camp.

In August 1943 the Germans conducted a major clearing operation, Operation Hermann (also dubbed the "big hunt"), against villages and partisan groups in the Naliboki forest. Partisan groups in the forest and surrounding villages suffered major casualties. The Bielski partisans, however, split into small groups and assembled back in their former base in the Jasinowo forest. The communities around the Naliboki forest were devastated, the Germans deported the non-Jewish residents fit for work to Germany for slave labor and murdered most of the rest. Prior to the manhunt, homeless refugees were mainly Jews who had escaped the ghetto, but in the fall of 1943 non-Jewish Belarusian, Polish, and Roma who managed to flee roamed in the forest. Many joined partisan units, special family camps set up by the Soviets, and some joined the Bielski group who returned to the area and accepted anyone willing to join. While the Germans wrecked many communities, much was left behind in and around the forest that could sustain life. Fields, orchards, and beehives all had their produce and farm animals roamed the area around the forest. While the buildings of the villages were partially demolished, much of the building material was left usable as well as some household goods. The Bielski group foraged and gathered much of these materials, and tended to the fields.

The Bielski partisans eventually became affiliated with Soviet organisations in the vicinity of the Naliboki forest under General Platon (Vasily Yefimovich Chernyshev). Several attempts by Soviet commanders to absorb the Bielski fighters into their units were resisted, and the Jewish partisan group retained its integrity and remained under Tuvia Bielski's command. This allowed him to continue his mission of protecting Jewish lives and engaging in combat activity, but it would prove a problem later on.

In September 1943 General Platon ordered the splitting of the group. The first group, named Ordzhonikidze (a famous Georgian communist), was a 180 mainly Jewish fighting detachment (commanded by a non-Jew Lyushenko). All the rest were designated as Kalinin (named for the Soviet head of state) and included some 800 people, including 160 armed defenders, that were based in Naliboki forest and provided services to other partisan groups in the forest as well as participating in sabotage and diversionary actions. On 1 April 1944, the group was renamed as the Bielski otriad.

Like other Soviet-affiliated partisan groups in the area, the Bielski partisans raided nearby villages and forcibly seized food; on occasion, peasants who refused to share their food with the partisans were subjected to violence, even murder. This caused hostility toward the partisans on the part of the peasants, though some willingly helped the Jewish partisans. Other peasants informed on the Jewish partisans in the forests to the Germans. As the region was already pacified by the Germans and many villages were burned to the ground, the local population was in an especially dire situation.

==== Assessment of combat operations ====
According to partisan documentation, in the period from the fall of 1943 to summer 1944 the Bielski fighters (1,140 Jews, 149 of whom were armed combatants) claimed to have carried out 38 combat missions, destroying two locomotives, 23 train cars, 32 telegraph poles, and four bridges. In total, the Bielski partisans claimed during the war to have killed 381 enemy fighters (in part, jointly with Soviet groups) and to have lost 50 members.

According to Kazimierz Krajewski, a November 1943 report from Tuvia Bielski to the Soviet command stated that in two years of operations Bielski Otriad killed 14 Germans, 17 policemen, and 33 spies and provocateurs (Krajewski thinks these likely included peasants unsympathetic to Soviet partisans or who had resisted being plundered). In his opinion, 14 Germans killed was not a substantial number for a two-year period. Further, Krajewski believes these numbers to be overestimated.

=== Relations with other groups ===
The Bielski partisans had friendly relations with the local Home Army commander, 2nd Lt. Kacper Miłaszewski. Miłaszewski, a native of the region, located his camp a kilometer from the Bielski camp, and according to Tuvia Bielski's memoirs felt a deep sympathy for the Bielski group because it sheltered women, elderly, and children. In August 1943 the Germans conducted a large-scale operation in the Naliboki forest, inflicting losses on civilians, Polish Home Army units, Soviet partisans, and the Bielski group.

Following the German action, in which the Home Army unit lost 120 men and was forced out of the forest, Miłaszewski was replaced with Adolf Pilch, who was placed in charge of the Stolpce battalion. By September 1943, the Soviets had begun a policy of confrontation against the Polish anti-Nazi underground, which it saw as a threat to their aims in Eastern Poland. In December, the Soviets drew Plich's men into a trap by inviting them to "friendly talks", then surrounded Pilch's men and threatened to execute kidnapped Polish officers unless the unit surrendered. Bielski's unit participated in this operation. Some 135 Polish soldiers and nine officers were arrested. However, Pilch managed to evade capture along with 50 others; according to Pilch the Bielski partisans were too distracted with pillaging the Polish camp in search of valuables, which allowed him to escape capture. Pilch's unit would continue to fight the Soviet partisans. Fighting on the Soviet side, the Bielski partisans took part in clashes between Polish and Soviet forces. On 5 March 1944, Zus's fighter detachment and Soviet forces jointly attacked a group of Polish fighters, killing 47 and injuring 20 more. On 22 March 20 Jewish fighters managed to ambush a Nazi convoy and kill 12. According to Kazimierz Krajewski, in May 1944, the village of Kamień in Stolpce was attacked by a force including Bielski partisans; 23 Home Army soldiers and 20 civilians were killed.

=== Internal conflict ===
Tuvia Bielski was known for his authoritarian leadership style and was constantly involved in power struggles with other members of the unit. Israel Kessler (who tried to organize a group of people to leave the Bielski camp and form their own unit) and others sent letters to General Platon and other Soviet officials that Tuvia Bielski was holding gold and jewelry in contradiction to partisan orders to hand these over to headquarters. A unit member, Stepan Szupien, suggested to the Soviets that they arrest and execute Bielski, accusing him of confiscating money under the pretext of buying weapons. The Soviet command, concerned about the unit's leadership, began an internal investigation into an alleged protection racket conducted by Bielski. Chernyshev cleared Bielski of the charges following an investigation. Bielski viewed Kessler's actions as rebellion, put Kessler on trial, and executed him. According to witness Estera Gorodejska, a drunk Bielski personally executed Kessler with three shots. Later Bielski ordered the destruction of Kessler's grave.

=== Disbandment ===
In the summer of 1944, following the Soviet Operation Bagration which allowed them to regain control over Belarus, the Kalinin unit, numbering some 1,200 of which 70 per cent were women, elderly and children, marched into Nowogródek. Following one final parade, they disbanded.

Despite their previous cooperation with the Soviets, relations quickly worsened. The NKVD started interrogating the Bielski brothers about the rumors of loot they had reportedly collected during the war and about their failure to "implement socialist ideals in the camp". Asael Bielski was conscripted into the Soviet Red Army and died in the Battle of Königsberg in 1945. The remaining brothers escaped Soviet-controlled lands, emigrating to the West. Tuvia's cousin Yehuda Bielski, who had joined the partisans after receiving a letter delivered by Tuvia's Christian friend Kanstancin Kazloŭski, was sought by the NKVD for having been an officer in the pre-war Polish Army but managed to escape with Tuvia's help and made his way to Hungary and then to Israel.

== Postwar ==
After the war, Tuvia Bielski returned to Poland, then immigrated to present-day Israel in 1945. Tuvia and Zus eventually settled in New York where they operated a successful trucking business. The last living Bielski brother, Aron Bielski, immigrated to the US in 1951. He changed his name to "Aron Bell." The remainder of the Bell family now lives in upstate New York and California. Aron lived in Florida and died in 2025. None of the Bielskis ever sought any recognition or reward for their actions.

Yehuda moved to Israel initially to fight in the Irgun and then as a lieutenant in the IDF in the 1948 Arab-Israeli war. Later he and his family moved to the US where he became a businessman.

== Books and film ==
Two English language books have focused on the Bielski story: Defiance (1993) by Nechama Tec and The Bielski Brothers (2004) by Peter Duffy. The group is also mentioned in numerous books about this period in history. Fugitives of the Forest: The Heroic Story of Jewish Resistance and Survival During the Second World War, by Allan Levine, tells the story of Jewish fighters and refugees in forests across Europe, including the Bielski partisans. With Courage Shall We Fight: The Memoirs and Poetry of Holocaust Resistance Fighters Frances "Fruma" Gulkowich Berger and Murray "Motke" Berger tells the story of two Bielski Brigade fighters before, during and after the war.

In 2006, the History Channel aired a documentary titled The Bielski Brothers: Jerusalem in the Woods, written and directed by filmmaker Dean Ward.

A book (January 2009) in Polish by two reporters from Gazeta Wyborcza, Odwet: Prawdziwa historia braci Bielskich (Revenge: The True Story of the Bielski Brothers) was accused of consisting of plagiarism and withdrawn.

The feature film Defiance, co-written, produced and directed by Edward Zwick, was released internationally in January 2009. It stars Daniel Craig, Liev Schreiber, Jamie Bell and George MacKay as Tuvia, Zus, Asael and Aron Bielski respectively. It opened to mixed reviews and raised questions about the roles various groups played during the war.

== See also ==
- Abba Kovner
- Kastner's Train
- Nakam
- The Pianist (2002 film)
- World War II Behind Closed Doors: Stalin, the Nazis and the West
- List of Holocaust films
