= George MacKay (actor) =

British actor (born 1992)

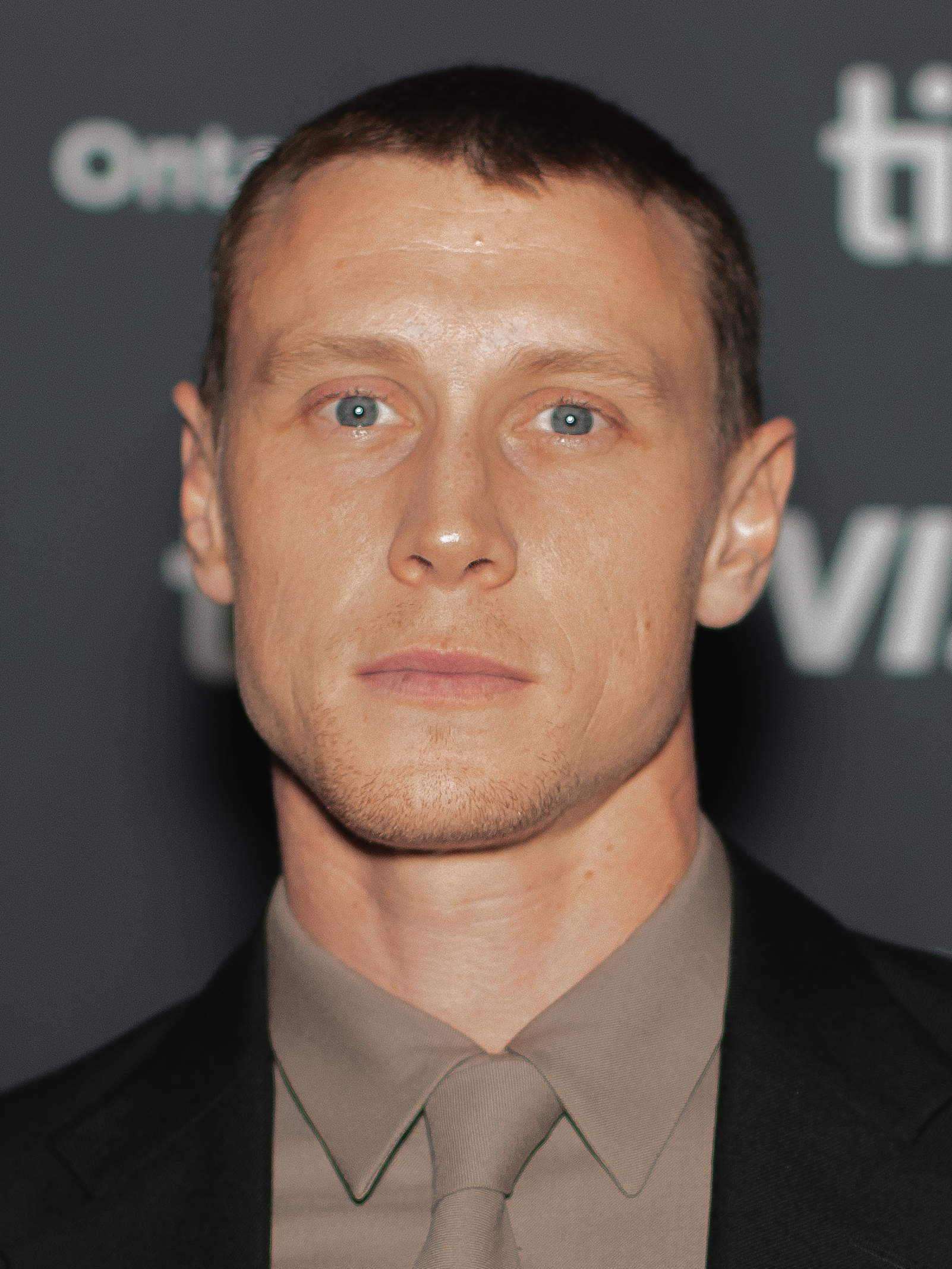
- MacKay in 2024
- Born: George Andrew J. MacKay; 13 March 1992 (age 34); Hammersmith, London, England
- Occupation: Actor
- Years active: 2002–present
- Spouse: Doone Forsyth (m. 2023)
- Children: 2

George Andrew J. MacKay (/məˈkaɪ/; born 13 March 1992) is an English actor. He began his career as a child actor in Peter Pan (2003). He had starring roles in the British war drama Private Peaceful (2012), the romantic film How I Live Now (2013), For Those in Peril (2013), for which he won a BAFTA Scotland Award, and Marrowbone (2017). He gained wider recognition for his leading role in the war film 1917 (2019) and won a British Independent Film Award for his performance in Femme (2023).

== Early life ==
MacKay was born in Hammersmith, London to Kim Baker, a British costume designer from London, and Paul MacKay, an Australian lighting and stage management worker from Adelaide. He is of partial Irish descent on his mother's side, his maternal grandmother being from Cork. He grew up in the London district of Barnes with his younger sister.

MacKay attended The Harrodian School, a private school in London. When he was 17, he unsuccessfully auditioned for entrance to the Royal Academy of Dramatic Art and the London Academy of Music and Dramatic Art.

== Career ==
=== 2002–2012: Beginnings as a child actor ===
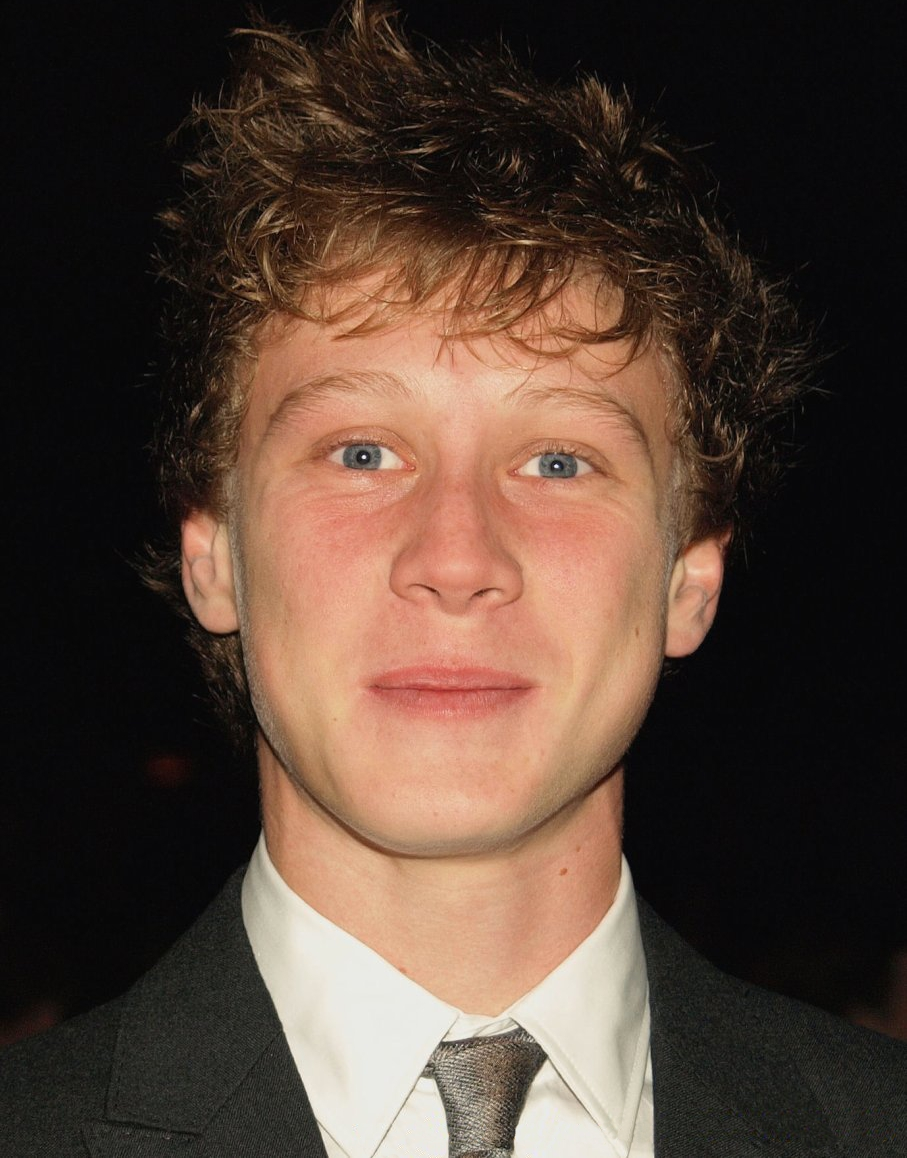
MacKay at the premiere for The Boys are Back in 2009

In 2002, MacKay was spotted at school by an acting scout who asked him to audition for a role in P. J. Hogan's 2003 film adaptation of Peter Pan. He attended a workshop and won the role of one of the Lost Boys, Curly, in what was his first professional acting job.

In 2005, at the age of 13, he won the role of Riccio in The Thief Lord, the film adaptation of Cornelia Funke's best-selling children's novel. He was also cast in the lead role in Johnny and the Bomb, a BBC three-part television drama adapted from Terry Pratchett's novel of the same name. MacKay also had some work in television, including roles in Rose and Maloney, Footprints in the Snow and The Brief. In the 2008 film Defiance, MacKay played Aron, the youngest of the four Bielski brothers. In 2009 he portrayed Harry in The Boys Are Back starring Clive Owen. MacKay co-starred in the Marc Evans-directed musical film Hunky Dory opposite Minnie Driver, Aneurin Barnard and Kimberley Nixon, which is set in 1970s Swansea.

=== 2012–2018: Rising popularity ===
In 2012, he played the main character, Private Tommo Peaceful, in Private Peaceful, and appeared as a paralyzed soldier in the inspirational film The Best of Men. In 2013, MacKay portrayed Eddie in How I Live Now opposite Saoirse Ronan and directed by Kevin Macdonald, and starred as Davy in the musical film Sunshine on Leith, featuring songs by The Proclaimers, directed by Dexter Fletcher. In 2014, MacKay played the role of Joe, a 20-year-old struggling to come out in a homophobic Britain in 1984 in the film Pride (based on a true story) also starring Bill Nighy.

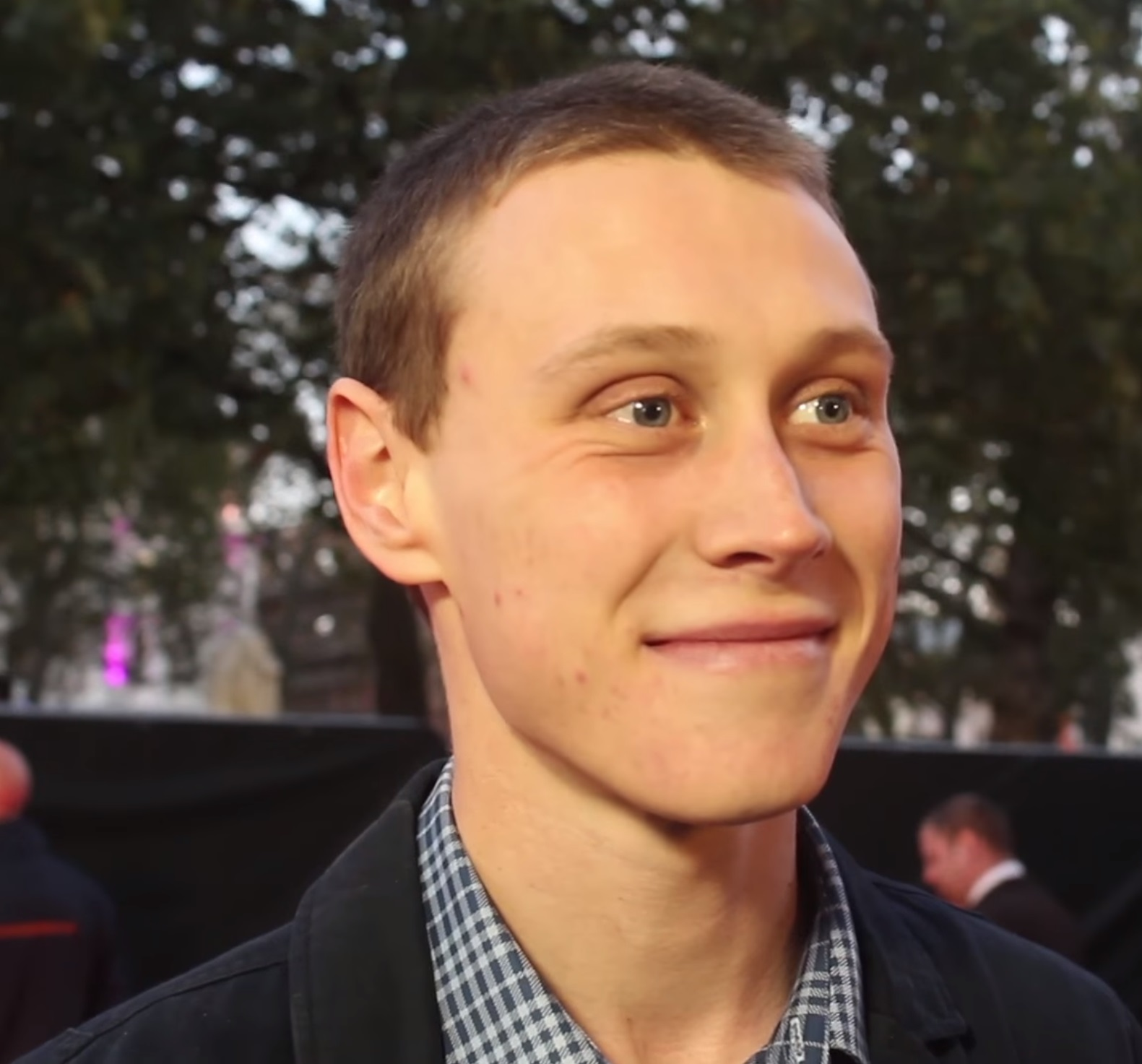
MacKay at the Premiere for Pride in 2014

In 2015, Mackay took the lead role as Richard Miller in Eugene O'Neill's coming-of-age play, Ah, Wilderness! directed by Natalie Abrahami at Young Vic. In July 2015, MacKay filled the title role of Lewis Aldridge in the BBC's two-part television adaptation of Sadie Jones’ debut novel The Outcast. In February 2016, he portrayed the part of Bill Turcotte in the Hulu production of Stephen King's sci-fi/thriller 11.22.63.

From 29 March to 14 May 2016, MacKay performed the part of Mick in Harold Pinter's play The Caretaker directed by Matthew Warchus at The Old Vic Theatre in London opposite Timothy Spall and Daniel Mays. In the 2016 film Captain Fantastic, MacKay portrayed Bodevan, eldest son of Ben Cash (Viggo Mortensen). In 2017, he played Jack, the main character in Marrowbone, a psychological horror film directed and written by Sergio G. Sánchez, and also starring Anya Taylor-Joy, Charlie Heaton and Mia Goth. MacKay portrayed Prince Hamlet in Ophelia, a 2018 film retelling the story of Shakespeare's play from the perspective of the young female character Ophelia. The film premiered at the 2018 Sundance Film Festival, and included Daisy Ridley, Naomi Watts, Clive Owen, and Tom Felton in the cast. In the 2018 film Where Hands Touch, MacKay portrayed Lutz, a member of the Hitler Youth in Nazi Germany who falls in love with a biracial girl, portrayed by Amandla Stenberg.

=== 2019–present: ===
In a 2019 release, MacKay interpreted the role of outlaw Ned Kelly in True History of the Kelly Gang, directed by Justin Kurzel. Adapted from the novel of the same name by Peter Carey, the film premiered at the 2019 Toronto International Film Festival. That same year, MacKay played the lead role of lance corporal William Schofield, a young British World War I soldier in 1917, directed by Sam Mendes. 1917 was nominated for Best Picture in the 92nd Academy Awards, along with nominations in nine other categories, winning three technical awards. MacKay stars in Nathalie Biancheri's film Wolf alongside Lily-Rose Depp, for which principal photography began in Ireland in August 2020. The film premiered at the Toronto International Film Festival in September 2021 as the entry for Ireland, and was theatrically released in December 2021. His acting in Wolf was called by IndieWire as "the best performance of his still-rising career".

In October 2021, MacKay was cast in the apocalyptic musical film The End along with Tilda Swinton and Stephen Graham, directed by Joshua Oppenheimer, and in 2022, he starred in Christian Schwochow's film Munich – The Edge of War for Netflix. In 2023, Mackay starred in LGBT revenge thriller Femme alongside Nathan Stewart-Jarrett, for which he won Best Joint Lead Performance in the British Independent Film Awards. Also in 2023 MacKay starred in the science fiction film The Beast.

In 2025, MacKay had a starring role in Cornish film Rose of Nevada which premiered at Venice International Film Festival, and went on general cinema release in Britain and Ireland in April 2026.

== Artistry and media reception ==
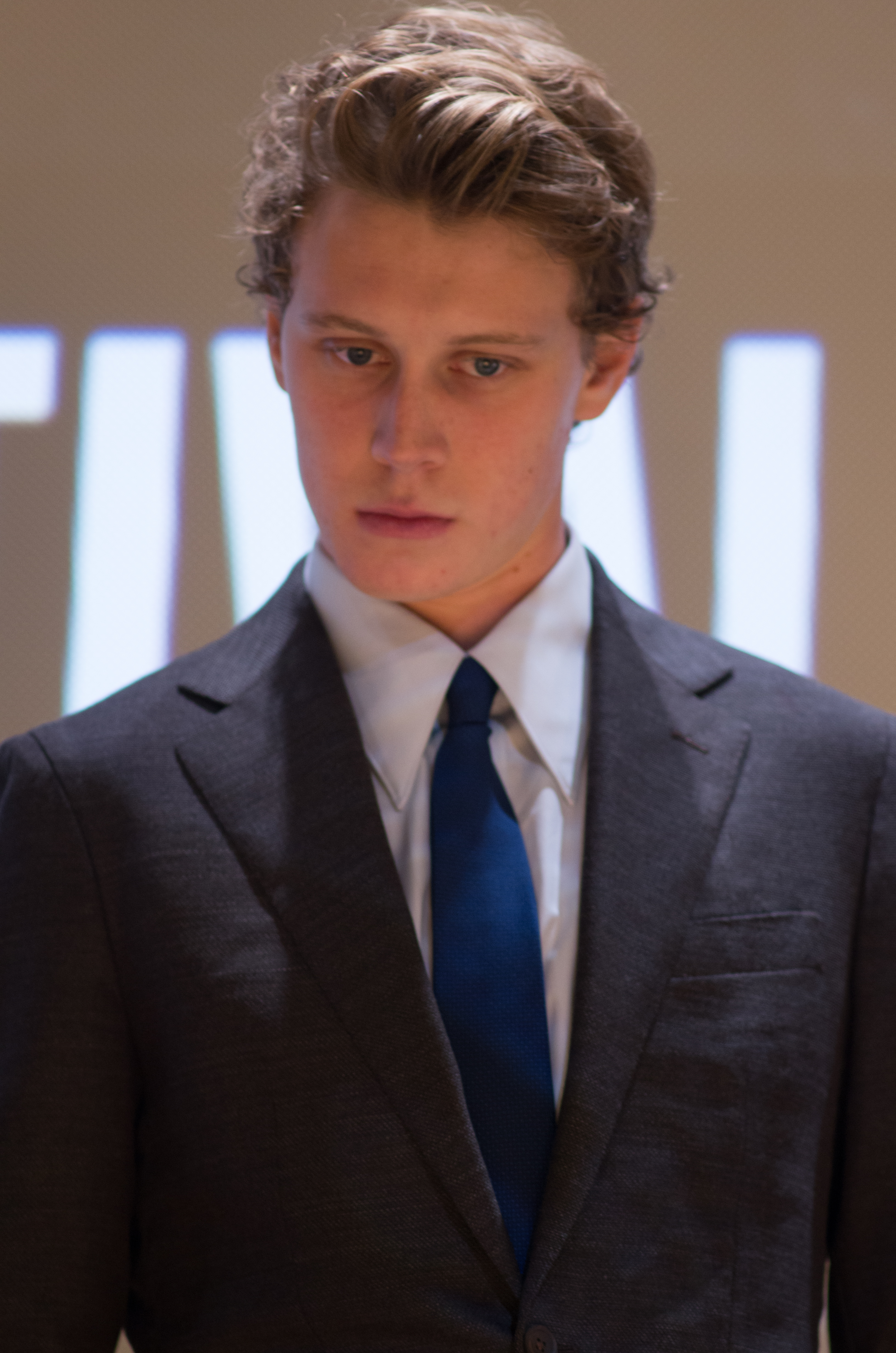
MacKay at the premiere for How I Live Now in 2013

MacKay cites actors Eddie Marsan and Viggo Mortensen as influences for his work. He credits Marsan as an influence in pursuing acting full-time. MacKay describes acting as being "done ultimately in a very safe environment" and "rooted in some kind of experience." MacKay has been called a method actor by several publications. Flaunt writer Elizabeth Aubrey stated that MacKay's roles are "chosen by a desire to push the boundaries of storytelling, to ask challenging questions about identity, and leave audiences with more questions than answers via stories that start important cultural conversations." The Last Magazine writer Jonathan Shia called MacKay's body of work "notable for both its length and its breadth." The Independent writer Alexandra Pollard wrote that MacKay's roles are tactically "chosen to broaden his perspective on the world" and that he is "clearly intensely thoughtful, in both conversation and in his career."

== Personal life ==
During the filming of How I Live Now in 2013, MacKay was briefly in a relationship with co-star Saoirse Ronan.

In November 2023, MacKay married his long-term girlfriend Doone Forsyth, a makeup artist and hair stylist whom he met on the set of 1917. The couple have two children, born in 2021 and 2023.

In January 2023, MacKay was one of almost 100 film and TV industry figures in the UK to sign a letter calling on the government to take "immediate action" against Iran's executions. In December 2025, MacKay appeared in a video with other celebrities to raise support for a charity single, "Lullaby", which aimed to raise funds for healthcare organisations in Palestine.

== Acting credits ==
Key
†	Denotes films that have not yet been released

=== Film ===
Year	Title	Role	Notes	Ref.
2003	Peter Pan	Curly		
2006	The Thief Lord	Riccio		
2008	Defiance	Aron Bielski		
2009	The Boys Are Back	Harry		
2011	Hunky Dory	Jake Zeppi		
2012	Private Peaceful	Private Tommo Peaceful		
2013	How I Live Now	Edmund 'Eddie'		
2013	Sunshine on Leith	Davy		
2013	For Those in Peril	Aaron		
2013	Breakfast With Jonny Wilkinson	Jake		
2014	Pride	Joe "Bromley" Cooper		
2014	Bypass	Tim		
2016	Captain Fantastic	Bodevan Cash		
2017	Marrowbone	Jack		
2018	Where Hands Touch	Lutz		
2018	Been So Long	Gil		
2018	Ophelia	Hamlet		
2019	True History of the Kelly Gang	Ned Kelly		
2019	A Guide to Second Date Sex	Ryan		
2019	1917	LCpl. William Schofield		
2020	Nuclear	Boy		
2021	Wolf	Jacob		
2021	Munich – The Edge of War	Hugh Legat		
2022	I Came By	Toby Nealey		
2023	Femme	Preston		
2023	The Beast	Louis		
2024	The End	Son		
2025	Rose of Nevada	Nick		
2025	& Sons	Jamie Dyer		
2025	Broken English	The Record Keeper		
2026	Sense and Sensibility	Edward Ferrars		
2027	Untitled Ocean's Eleven prequel †		Filming	
TBA	Cry to Heaven †	Bettichino	Post-production	
TBA	Mission †	Dylan	Post-production	

=== Television ===
Year	Title	Role	Notes	Ref.
2004	Rose and Maloney	Young Calum	Episode 1: "Rose and Maloney — Part 1"	
2005	Footprints in the Snow	Nathan Hill	TV movie	
2005	The Brief	Zak Farmer	Series 2; Episode 1: "Blame," Episode 2: "Lack of Affect"	
2006	Johnny and the Bomb	Johnny Maxwell	Miniseries	
2006	Tsunami: The Aftermath	Adam Peabody	Miniseries	
2007	The Old Curiosity Shop	Kit Nubbles	TV movie	
2012	Birdsong	Private Douglas	TV movie	
2012	The Best of Men	Private William Heath	TV movie	
2015	The Outcast	Lewis Aldridge	Miniseries	
2016	11.22.63	Bill Turcotte	Miniseries	
2016	Neil Gaiman's Likely Stories	Simon Powers	Episode: "Foreign Parts"	
2018	To Provide All People	Father	TV movie	
2020	Ataraxia	Boy	Miniseries	
2021	The Trick	Sam Bowen	TV movie	

=== Theatre ===
Year	Title	Role	Author	Theatre	Ref.
2014	The Cement Garden	Jack	Ian McEwan	Heritage Arts Company	
2015	Ah, Wilderness!	Richard	Eugene O'Neill	The Young Vic Company	
2016	The Caretaker	Mick	Harold Pinter	The Old Vic	

=== Audio ===
Year	Title	Role	Author	Station	Ref.
2017	Living Room	Milo	Part of the BBC POD PLAY1 short-form audio drama series	BBC Radio 3	
2020	The Glass Menagerie	Tom	Tennessee Williams	BBC Radio 3	

== Awards and nominations ==
Year	Award	Category	Work	Result	Ref.
2010	London Critics Circle Film Awards	Young British Actor of the Year	—N/a	Nominated	
2013	BAFTA Scotland	Best Actor / Actress – Film	For Those in Peril	Won	
2014	British Academy Film Awards	Rising Star Award	—N/a	Nominated	
2014	Berlin International Film Festival	Shooting Stars Award – Actor	—N/a	Won	
2014	London Critics Circle Film Awards	Young British Actor of the Year	—N/a	Nominated	
2014	Richard Attenborough Film Awards	Breakthrough Award	—N/a	Won	
2017	Screen Actors Guild Awards	Outstanding Performance by a Cast in a Motion Picture	Captain Fantastic	Nominated	
2017	Cannes Film Festival	Trophée Chopard	—N/a	Won	
2017	New Renaissance Film Festival	Best Actor	Infinite	Won	
2019	Satellite Awards	Best Actor in a Motion Picture – Drama	1917	Nominated	
2019	IGN Awards	Best Lead Performer	1917	Nominated	
2020	Santa Barbara International Film Festival	Virtuoso Award	1917	Won	
2020	Georgia Film Critics Association	Breakthrough Award	1917	Nominated	
2020	Online Film & Television Association	Best Breakthrough Performance: Male	1917	Won	
2020	London Critics Circle Film Awards	British / Irish Actor of the Year	True History of the Kelly Gang, 1917	Nominated	
2023	British Independent Film Awards	Best Joint Lead Performance	Femme	Won	(Note: Shared with Nathan Stewart-Jarrett.)
