= For Those in Peril (2013 film) =

2013 film directed by Paul Wright

- Theatrical release poster
- Directed by: Paul Wright
- Written by: Paul Wright
- Produced by: Mary Burke; Polly Stokes
- Starring: George MacKay
- Cinematography: Benjamin Kračun
- Edited by: Michael Aaglund
- Music by: Erik Enocksson
- Production companies: Warp X Productions; Film4 Productions
- Release dates: May 2013 (Cannes); 4 October 2013
- Running time: 92 minutes
- Country: United Kingdom
- Language: English
- Box office: £2,412

For Those in Peril is a 2013 British drama film directed by Paul Wright. It was released in the United Kingdom on 4 October 2013 to positive reviews.

The title is taken from the repeated line of William Whiting's famous hymn "Eternal Father, Strong to Save" traditionally sung following a loss at sea.

== Plot ==
Aaron, a young misfit living in a remote Scottish fishing community, is the lone survivor of a strange fishing accident that claimed the lives of five men, including his older brother, Michael. No one knows what became of the others, and Aaron insists that he can remember nothing of the incident. Treated as an outcast, Aaron begins behaving erratically, insisting that the others are not dead and that he must find them. Meanwhile, Aaron's mother Cathy must mourn for her lost son while protecting the son she has left.

Aaron is obsessed with finding Michael, looking for him everywhere. He frequently goes to the seashore calling Michael's name. The only person who will talk to him is Michael's girlfriend, Jane. He forms a romantically charged relationship with her and tries to enlist her help in finding Michael. This causes rifts with Jane's father and the local community, who increasingly accuse Aaron of being responsible for the fishermen's deaths.

Flashbacks to home movies reveal that Aaron hung around Michael and Jane constantly, and his relationship with Michael was more antagonistic than it at first seemed. We see Aaron raging in anger and running a knife along the sides of his neck. He gets into a series of violent confrontations with Jane's father, Jane herself, and several local youths. Now completely ostracized, he sets out himself on the ocean with a makeshift raft and spear to locate Michael, using bait fish as a lure, but finds nothing. In another attempt, he kidnaps a local youth and drags him into the ocean to use as bait, but a local ship rescues his captive before he finds anything.

Cathy is forced to submit her son to mental health treatment in lieu of criminal charges. On the night before he's to depart, Aaron asks Cathy to tell him the bedtime story he remembers from his childhood. The story goes that the Devil took the form of a giant red fish that swallowed up all the children of the village, but a young boy found the fish and rescued all of the children so that they could live together forever in happiness. In the middle of the night, Aaron sneaks away, uses a knife to slice gills into his neck, and dives into the ocean. The next morning, Cathy awakens and follows sounds of commotion to the beach, where she finds a giant red fish washed up onto the shore. Michael, alive and well, rests his head on Aaron's shoulder.

== Cast ==
- George MacKay – Aaron
- Kate Dickie – Cathy
- Michael Smiley – Frank
- Nichola Burley – Jane

== Production ==
The film was shot in Gourdon, Aberdeenshire and editing of the first cut was carried out in Paul Wright's native Fife and continued in London.

It was shown in Critics' Week at the 2013 Cannes Film Festival.

== Critical reception ==
Peter Bradshaw for The Guardian rated it 3/5, comparing it to Bashing (2005) directed by Masahiro Kobayashi, and calling it "a striking film from a valuable new talent." Mark Kermode called it an "affecting and atmospheric fable", praising Kate Dickie's performance as "extraordinary" and likewise that of Michael Smiley.
