= Aron Bielski =

Member of the Bielski partisans group (1927–2025)

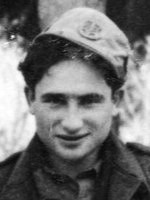
- Bielski c. 1950
- Born: July 21, 1927; Stankiewicze, near Novogrudok, Second Polish Republic (now Belarus)
- Died: September 22, 2025 (aged 98); Palm Beach, Florida, U.S.
- Other names: Aaron Bielski; Aharon Bielski; Aron Bell; Arczyk Bielski
- Spouse(s): Judith Weinstock (divorced) Henryka Zaworska
- Children: 3
- Relatives: Tuvia Bielski, brother Asael Bielski, brother Alexander Zeisal Bielski, brother

Aron Bielski (July 21, 1927 – September 22, 2025), later changed to Aron Bell, was a Polish-American Jew who was a member of the Bielski partisans, the largest group of Jewish armed rescuers of Jews during World War II. He was also known as Arczyk Bielski. The youngest of the four Bielski brothers, he was the last living prior to his death in 2025 (Asael died in 1945, Tuvia in 1987, and Alexander ["Zus"] in 1995).

== Life with the Bielski partisans ==
The Bielski family were farmers in Stankiewicze near Navahrudak in present-day Belarus, an area that at the beginning of the Second World War belonged to the Second Polish Republic. Aron was born there on July 21, 1927. In September 1939, it was seized by the Soviet Union, which was then allied with Nazi Germany. After the Germans launched Operation Barbarossa, the invasion of the Soviet Union, Aron's brothers created a notable resistance organization, the Bielski partisans group, of which Aron became a member. While Nechama was not able to interview Aron, he was interviewed by Peter Duffy in Duffy's book. That author, in the second authoritative book about the Bielski partisans, mentions Aron about 30 times and lists him as one of the important sources for the book. Duffy also interviewed Bell for the article "Heroes Among Us" (2000), published in The New York Times.

== Later life and death ==
After the war, Bielski returned to Poland but soon afterward emigrated to the British Mandate of Palestine. In 1954, he settled in the United States, where he joined his surviving brothers and their families.

In 2007, Bielski and his wife Henryka were charged with exploitation of the elderly, theft, and scheming to defraud after they convinced a Polish Catholic neighbor in Florida, Janina Zaniewska, to give them power of attorney before taking her to Poland and depositing her in a nursing home. A bank manager alerted police after becoming alarmed that the Bielskis were withdrawing Zaniewska's money. Police in Poland were able to locate Zaniewska at the nursing home and allow her to return to her home in America.

In 2008, charges were dropped after the Bielskis agreed to repay Zaniewska over $260,000 that they had been charged for swindling from her.

Aron Bielski died in Palm Beach, Florida on September 22, 2025, at the age of 98.

== In popular culture ==
English actor George MacKay portrayed Aron in the film Defiance (2008).
