= Nalibaki =

Nalibaki Налібакі (Belarusian)
- Agrotown
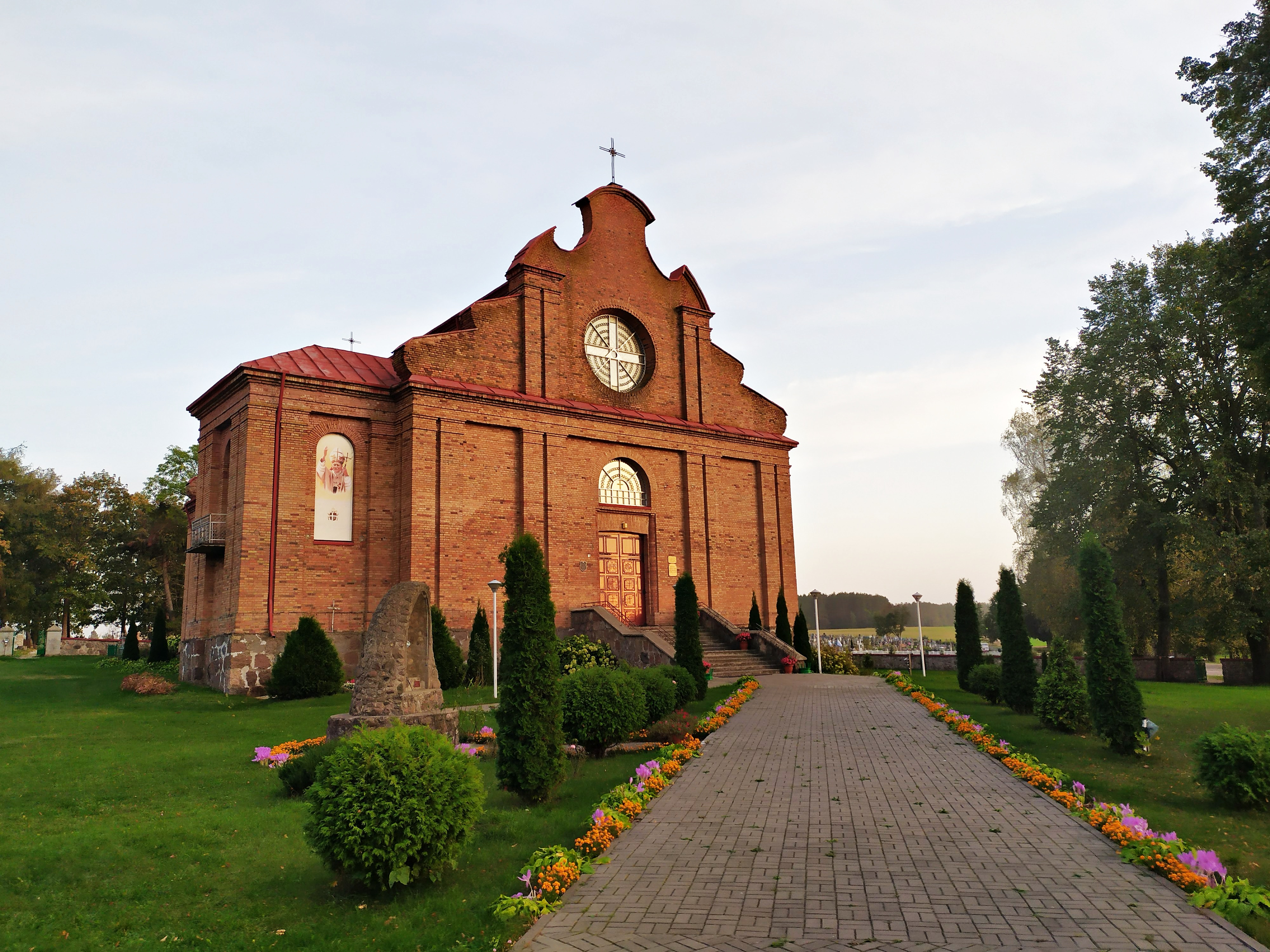
- Church of Assumption of Holy Virgin

- Location within Belarus
- Coordinates: 53°45′46″N 26°28′08″E
- Country: Belarus
- Region: Minsk Region
- District: Stowbtsy District
- Time zone: UTC+3 (MSK)

Nalibaki or Naliboki (Belarusian: Налібакі; Russian: Налибоки; Polish: Naliboki) is an agrotown in Stowbtsy District, Minsk Region, Belarus. It serves as the administrative center of Nalibaki selsoviet.

== History ==
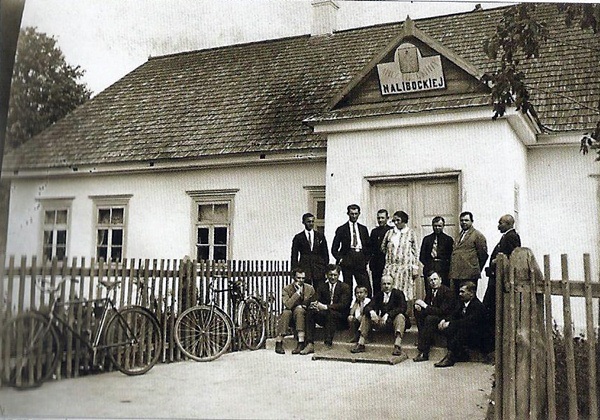
Naliboki in the interwar period

During the times of the Polish–Lithuanian Commonwealth, since 1555 the settlement belonged to the family of the Radziwiłł magnates. Eventually it has grown into a miasteczko. Since 1722 it was the home of a glass factory founded by Anna Radziwiłł, closed in 1862.

After the Second Partition of Poland, since 1793 it belonged to the Russian Empire. In 1896 it was part of Oszmiana Uyezd, Vilna Governorate, Russian Empire.

In 1919 a battle of the Polish-Soviet war occurred nearby.

Naliboki was part of the Second Polish Republic throughout the interwar period, administratively in gmina Naliboki, part of Wołożyń County until 1930, and Stołpce County afterwards, both within the Nowogródek Voivodeship. It was formally divided into a town, village and manor farm. According to the 1921 census, the town, village and manor farm combined had a population of 1,738, 92.2% Polish and 7.0% Belarusian by declared nationality, and 86.7% Catholic, 11.1% Jewish and 2.2% Orthodox by religion.

Following the 1939 Soviet invasion of Poland, it was annexed to Byelorussian SSR of the Soviet Union. During World War II, the Jewish population of Nalibaki was massacred by the Germans, with some escaping and joining the Soviet partisans, while 129 Poles were massacred by Soviet partisans on May 9, 1943 (see the Nalibaki massacre).

On August 6, 1943, Naliboki was pacified again, this time by German troops, as part of the so-called 'Operation Hermann', and its inhabitants were deported deep into the Reich for forced labor.

== See also ==
- Naliboki forest
- Naliboki massacre
