= Jewish partisans =

Anti-Nazi fighting groups of Jews in World War II

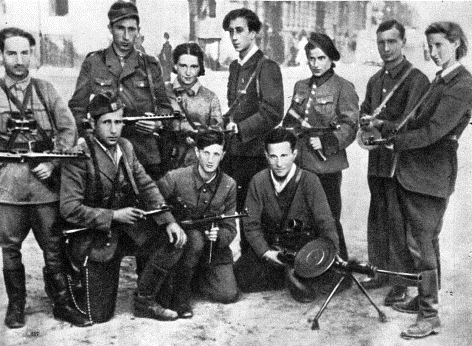
Members of the Fareynikte Partizaner Organizatsye, active in the Vilna Ghetto

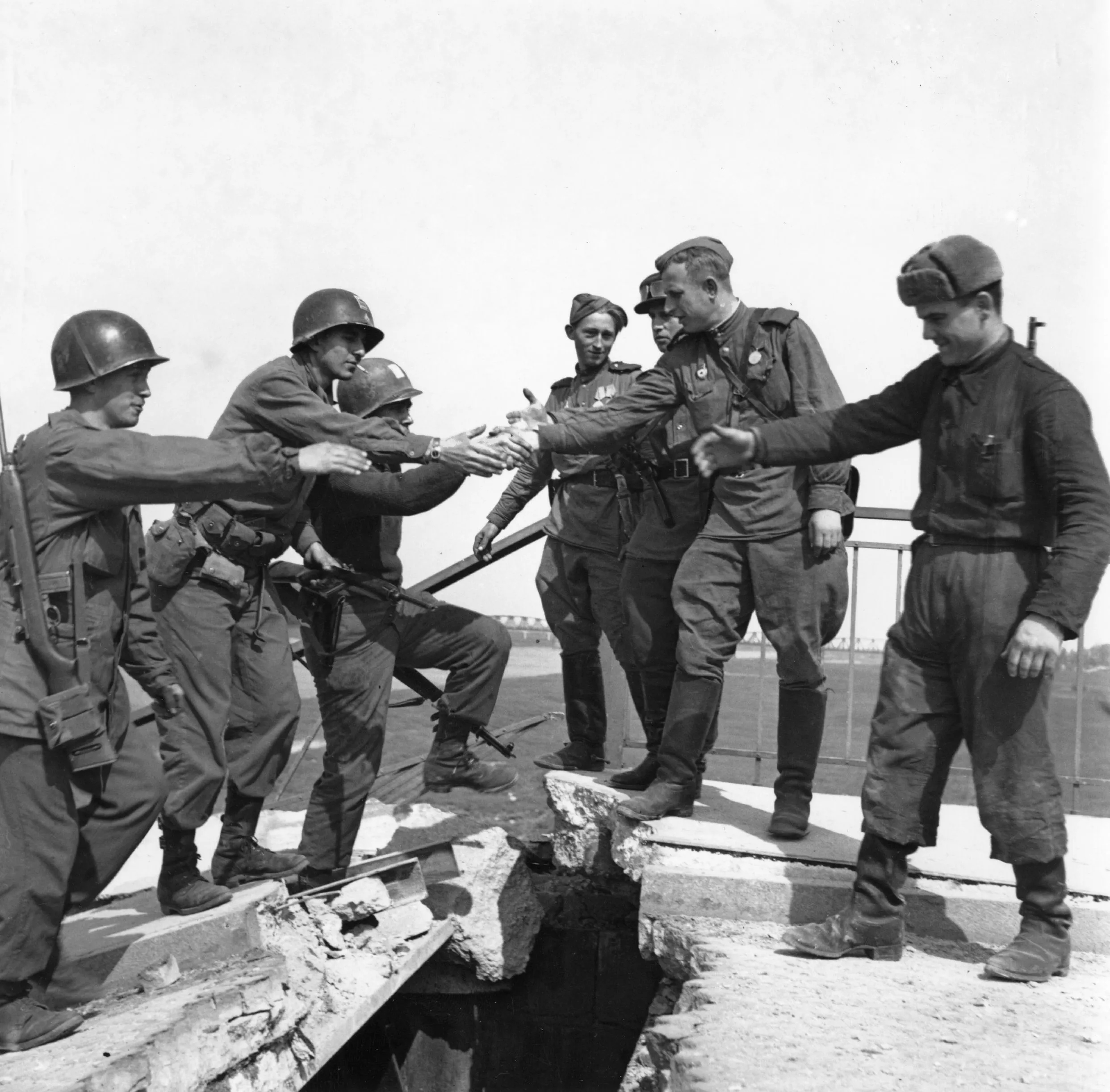
Jewish partisan in Poland turned Soviet Lt. Charles Thau (center, looking into camera), after linking up with US Army troops, on 25 April 1945 at the Elbe River

Jewish partisans were fighters in irregular military groups participating in the Jewish resistance movement against Nazi Germany and its collaborators during World War II.

A number of Jewish partisan groups operated across Nazi-occupied Europe, some made up of a few escapees from the Jewish ghettos or concentration camps, while others, such as Bielski partisans, numbered in the hundreds and included women and children. They were most numerous in Eastern Europe, but groups also existed in occupied France and Belgium, where they worked with the local resistance. Many individual Jewish fighters took part in the other partisan movements in other occupied countries. Some individual Jewish fighters, like Chaim Thau, a Polish survivor who was discovered by Red Army combatants, actually joined up with the Soviets on their advance to Berlin, linking up with US forces along the way.

In total, the Jewish partisans numbered between 20,000 and 30,000.

== Operations ==
The partisans engaged in guerrilla warfare and sabotage against the Nazi occupation, instigated ghetto uprisings, and freed prisoners. In Lithuania alone, they killed approximately 3,000 German soldiers. They sometimes had contacts within the ghettos, camps, Judenrats, and with other resistance groups, with whom they shared military intelligence.

In Eastern Europe, many Jews joined the ranks of the Soviet partisans: throughout the war, they faced antisemitism and discrimination from the Soviets and some Jewish partisans were killed, but over time, many of the Jewish partisan groups were absorbed into the command structure of the much larger Soviet partisan movement. Soviet partisans arrived in the western Ukraine in 1943, and consisted of Russians, Ukrainians, Poles, and Jews, and were smaller in size than units in Belarus, which was more suitable for partisan warfare. Released Soviet archive data suggest that Jews accounted for 5.2% of the partisans in Ukraine.

== Supplies ==
Jewish partisans had to overcome great odds in acquiring weapons, food, and shelter and in evading capture. They typically lived in dugouts (known in Russian as zemlyankas, землянка) in forest camps. Nazi reprisals were brutal, employing collective punishment against their supporters and the ghettos from which the partisans had escaped, and often using "anti-partisan operations" as pretexts for the extermination of Jews. In some areas, Jewish partisans received support from villagers, but due to widespread antisemitism and fear of reprisal, the Jewish partisans were often on their own. The farmers were struggling to supply all the different forces which were demanding food, at times leading to conflict. As Allan Levine noted, "That Jewish partisans and fugitives were guilty of stealing food from Polish farmers is an uncontested fact. It happened regularly.", but at the same time notes that such robberies were their only choice other than starvation.

The food situation varied between units, while some faced starvation, others were well supplied and sent their food stocks to Soviet Union. In order to survive, Jews had to put aside traditional dietary restrictions. While friendly peasants provided food, in some cases food was stolen from shops, farms or raided from caches meant for German soldiers. As the war progressed, the Soviet government occasionally airdropped ammunition, counterfeit money and food supplies to partisan groups known to be friendly.

Those who managed to flee the ghettos and camps had nothing more than the clothes on their backs, and their possessions often were reduced to rags through constant wear. Clothes and shoes were a scarce commodity. German uniforms were highly prized trophies: they were warm and served as disguises for future missions.

Those who were wounded or maimed or fell ill often did not survive due to the lack of medical help or supplies. Most partisan groups had no physician and treated the wounded themselves, turning to village doctors only as a last resort.

The forests also concealed family camps where Jewish escapees from camps or ghettos, many of whom were too young or too old to fight, hoped to wait out the war. While some partisan groups required combat readiness and weapons as a condition for joining, many noncombatants found shelter with Jewish fighting groups and their allies. These individuals and families contributed to the welfare of the group by working as craftsmen, cooks, seamstresses and field medics.

== Notable partisan groups ==
Jewish partisan groups of note include the Bielski partisans who operated a large "family camp" in Belorussia (numbering over 1,200 by the summer of 1944), the Parczew partisans of southeast Poland, and the United Partisan Organization which attempted to start an uprising in the Vilnius Ghetto in Lithuania and later engaged in sabotage and guerrilla operations. Thirty-two Jews from the Mandate for Palestine were trained by the British and parachuted behind enemy lines to engage in resistance activities. In the Warsaw Ghetto Uprising, two groups of partisans, the right-wing Jewish Military Union (Żydowski Związek Wojskowy, ŻZW) and the left-wing Jewish Combat Organization (Żydowska Organizacja Bojowa, ŻOB) led the uprising separately.

=== Poland ===
Approximately 100,000 Jews fought in the Polish army against Nazi Germany during the German invasion of Poland. They made up 10% of the Polish Army, commensurate with the percentage of Jews within the general population. Approximately 30,000 Jews were killed in that campaign, captured or declared missing. The Polish Home Army provided training and weapons to the Warsaw Ghetto's Jewish Combat Organization, and included in its ranks Jewish individuals and Jewish units, such as Lukawiecki Partisans commanded by Edmund Łukawiecki and working under the umbrella of the Home Army, as well as the Jewish Platoon Wigry which took part in the 1944 Warsaw Uprising. It also collaborated with Jewish units in self-defence operations. Other Jews joined units affiliated with the Soviet partisans in Poland. Eventually the Armia Ludowa (AL) was founded as the main communist-affiliated partisan group in occupied Poland. This group was provided with weapons by the Soviet Union. There were around 30 Jewish partisan detachments and most of these were connected to the AL. About half of these were detachments off in forests. Independent partisan groups also operated in these forests, working to liberate Jews from local ghettos without outside support or coordination. Notably, the Swirz partisans, founded by brothers Isidore and Hersch Karten, liberated over 400 Jews in Eastern Galicia.

=== Soviet Union ===
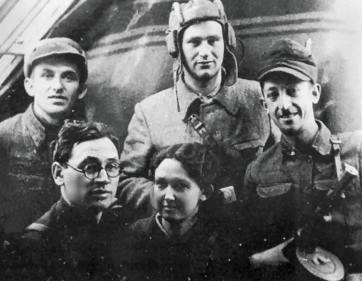
Chkalov Brigade partisans in 1943

The Soviet Union was late in having partisan groups. The first ones started around 1941–1942. These groups mainly appeared in forests, as 6,000–8,000 Jews were able to escape to the forests. Many did not make it, but if they did they joined Soviet partisan detachments. One partisan group in the Soviet area was the Minsk Ghetto. The Minsk Ghetto was the fourth largest ghetto in Europe. The group was led by the Jewish communists. The group within the Minsk ghetto was supported by the Jewish council which allowed them to organize a mass escape into the surrounding woods. This escape released between 6,000 and 8,000 Jews, who tried to join existing partisan groups. They were known for their resistance movements. There were a large number of partisan groups in the Soviet Union but not much information can be found on them due to Soviet record keeping.

=== Lithuania ===
In Lithuania, there were four ghettos that remained after the mass murder campaign by the Nazis in 1941. There were armed resistance groups in three of them – Vilna, Švenčionys, and Kovno. The Vilna Ghetto was the site of the first Jewish resistance group known as Fareynikte Partizaner Organizatsye or FPO. The FPO tried to persuade the occupants within the Vilna Ghetto to revolt against the Nazis but it failed. This led the group to leave after an armed altercation in September 1943. The partisan group left the ghetto because of a lack of support and went through the sewers to escape to the eastern Lithuanian woods. However the partisan group in the Kovno Ghetto had no intention of fighting in the ghetto itself. They had always planned to fight outside of the ghetto. They organized a large escape from the ghetto that took place over a long period of time. It led to many people escaping and joining outside partisan groups, which eventually led them to create their own.

=== Yugoslavia ===
Jewish contribution to the Yugoslav Partisan movement was significant. There were 4,572 Jews listed as partisans, 3,000 of whom were in fighting units. Those who joined were those fleeing deportation, or those that had escaped or had been liberated from concentration and labour camps. One such example was that of the Rab battalion, which consisted of hundreds of Jewish inmates liberated from the Italian Rab concentration camp in September 1943.

1,318 Jews fighting for the partisans were killed during the war, ten Jewish members were awarded Yugoslavia's highest medal at that time, the Order of the People's Hero.

== Notable partisans ==
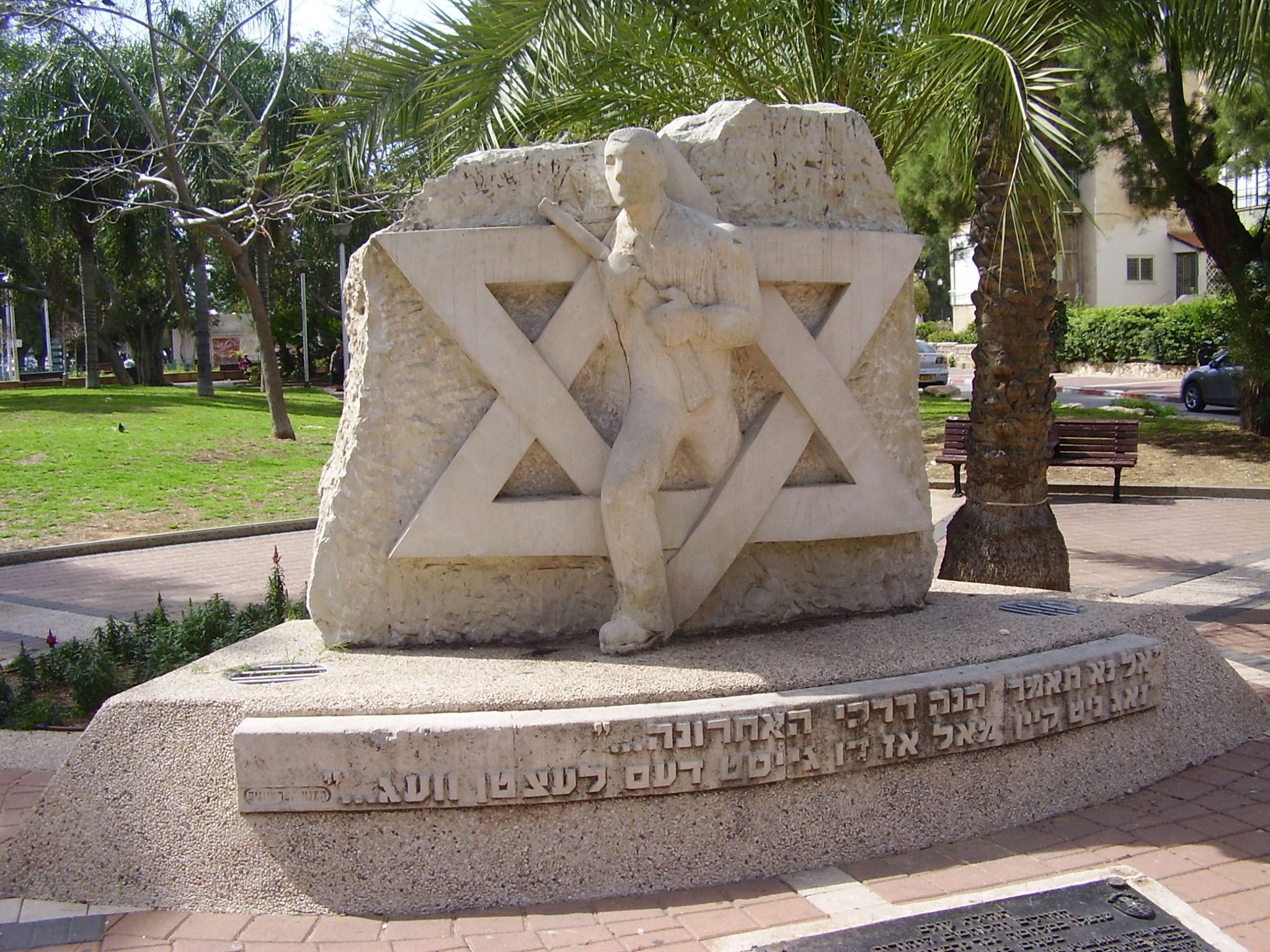
Jewish Partisans Memorial in Bat Yam, Israel. On the bottom, words of the partisan song Zog nit keyn mol in hebrew and yiddish: "don't say this is my last way"

- Nisim Albahari
- Mordechai Anielewicz
- Mordechai Schlein
- Dawid Apfelbaum
- Yitzhak Arad
- Bielski partisans
- Frank Blaichman
- Thomas Blatt
- Antun Blažić
- Alexander Bogen
- Masha Bruskina
- Eugenio Calò
- Icchak Cukierman
- Oskar Danon
- Selma Engel-Wijnberg
- Leon Feldhendler
- Dov Freiberg
- Paweł Frenkiel
- Hirsh Glick
- Munyo Gruber
- Slavko Goldstein
- Irene Gut Opdyke
- Abba Kovner
- Vladka Meed
- Parczew partisans
- Izidor Papo
- Roza Papo
- Alexander Pechersky
- Moša Pijade
- Haviva Reik
- Joseph Serchuk
- Hannah Szenes
- Charles Thau
- Yitzhak Wittenberg
- Shalom Yoran
- Simcha Zorin

== See also ==
- Jewish resistance in German-occupied Europe
- Jewish Combat Organization
- Jewish Military Union
- United Partisan Organization
- Jewish Partisan Educational Foundation
- Charles Thau

== Bibliography ==
- Arad, Y. (1990). "Family Camps in the Forests". Encyclopaedia of the Holocaust. Vol. 2. New York: Macmillan. pp. 467–469. OCLC 698360041.
- Eckmann, L.; Lazar, C. (1977). The Jewish Resistance: the history of the Jewish partisans in Lithuania and White Russia. New York: Shengold. OCLC 473836052.
- Gutman, I. (1990). "Partisans". Encyclopaedia of the Holocaust. Vol. 3. New York: Macmillan. pp. 1108–1122. OCLC 698360042.
- Kagan, J.; Cohen, D. (1998). Surviving the Holocaust with the Russian Jewish partisans. London: Vallentine Mitchell. ISBN 9780853033356.
- Levin, D. (1985). Fighting back: Lithuanian Jewry's armed resistance to the Nazis, 1941–1945. New York: Holmes & Meier. ISBN 9780841908314.
- Levin, D.; Brown, Z. A. (1962). The Story of an Underground: The Resistance of the Jews of Kovno. Jerusalem: Yad Vashem. OCLC 460277004.
- Levin, N. (1973). "Resistance in the Forest". The Holocaust: the destruction of European Jewry. New York: Schocken Books. ISBN 9780805203769. OCLC 488360602.
- Smolar, H. (1989). The Minsk Ghetto: Soviet–Jewish partisans against the Nazis. New York: Holocaust Library. ISBN 9780896040687.
