= Naliboki massacre =

1943 massacre of Poles

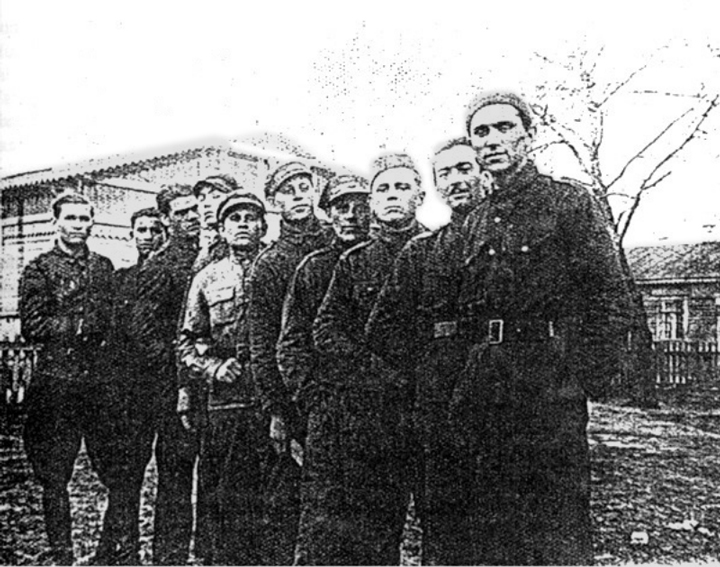
- Naliboki self-defence unit
- Location: Naliboki, German-occupied Poland
- Date: 8 May 1943
- Weapons: Automatic and semi-automatic weapons
- Deaths: 129
- Victim: Poles
- Perpetrator: Soviet partisans

The Naliboki massacre (Polish: zbrodnia w Nalibokach) was the 8 May 1943 mass killing of 127 or 128 Poles by Soviet partisans in the small town of Naliboki in German-occupied Poland (the town is now in Belarus).

== Background ==
Before the 1939 German-Soviet invasion of Poland, Naliboki was part of eastern Poland's Stołpce County, Nowogródek Province.

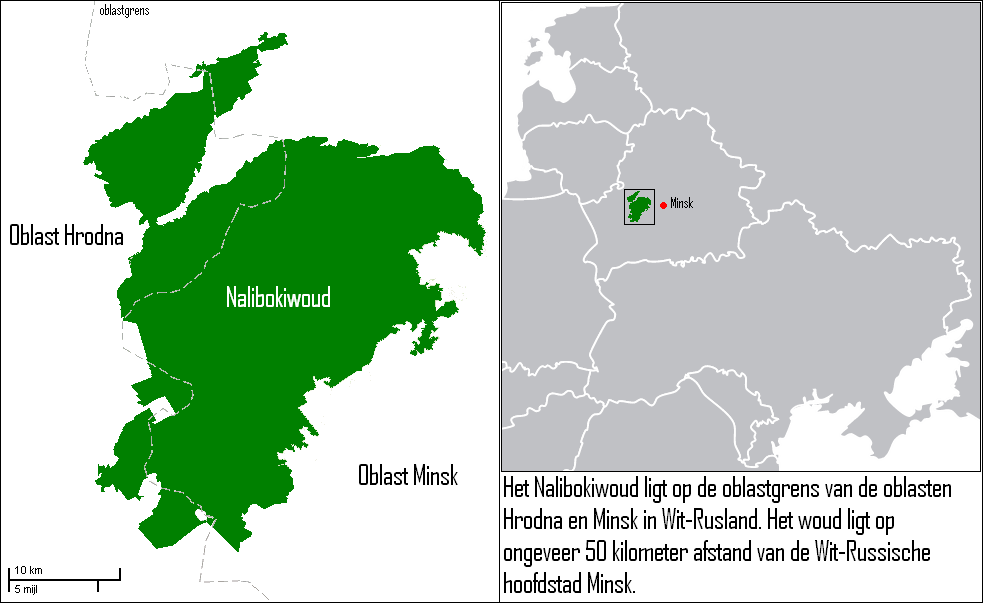
Location of the Naliboki forest on the map of Belarus

Following Operation Barbarossa, Germany's invasion of the Soviet Union, Soviet resistance forces operated in eastern Poland, behind German lines. From the spring of 1942, the 125th "Stalin" unit operated in the Naliboki forest. Its first documented action was the destruction of a detachment of German police near Naliboki on 9 June 1942. Two other Soviet partisan units operated in the Nalibok forest: the Nikitin's unit and the "Chkalov" unit. Local partisans were recruited from Red Army soldiers of all ethnicities who had been cut off by German encirclements, from Ukrainians and pro-Soviet Belarusians. These troops had no contact with the Central Headquarters of the Partisan Movement (CSPD), limited their attacks on German units for lack of ammunition, and raided nearby villages for supplies. They forcibly took provisions from villagers, whom they treated as enemies. The murder of peasants by way of terrorizing them into giving up provisions began in 1943 when villages such as Kamień, Derewno, Borowikowszczyzna, Dziagwie, and Rodziewszczyzna were raided. Naliboki was among the raided villages. Consequently, in August 1942, by order of the Germans, the villagers formed a self-defense unit, and the village police station was opened. Both the local self-defense and police were infiltrated by the Home Army.

In the spring of 1943, NKVD leaders were sent to Soviet partisans by CSPD, and the partisans were airdropped material. They were led by Vasily Chernyshov "Platon" who, equipped with a radio station, reached the Naliboki forest in April, where he took command of the entire partisan movement in the Baranovichi oblast. In May, there were more than 5,000 partisans under his command, divided into 36 divisions and 4 brigades, most of them operating in the Naliboki forest.

In March and April 1943, the Soviet partisans arranged two meetings with the Polish self-defense leaders. During the talks, the Soviet partisans insisted that the Poles join them, but the Poles refused. However, an agreement was signed with the Poles, who were represented by Eugeniusz Klimowicz, concerning a truce and joint operations against robbers hiding in the forest. The Soviet partisans violated the truce and decided to attack Naliboki.

== The massacre ==
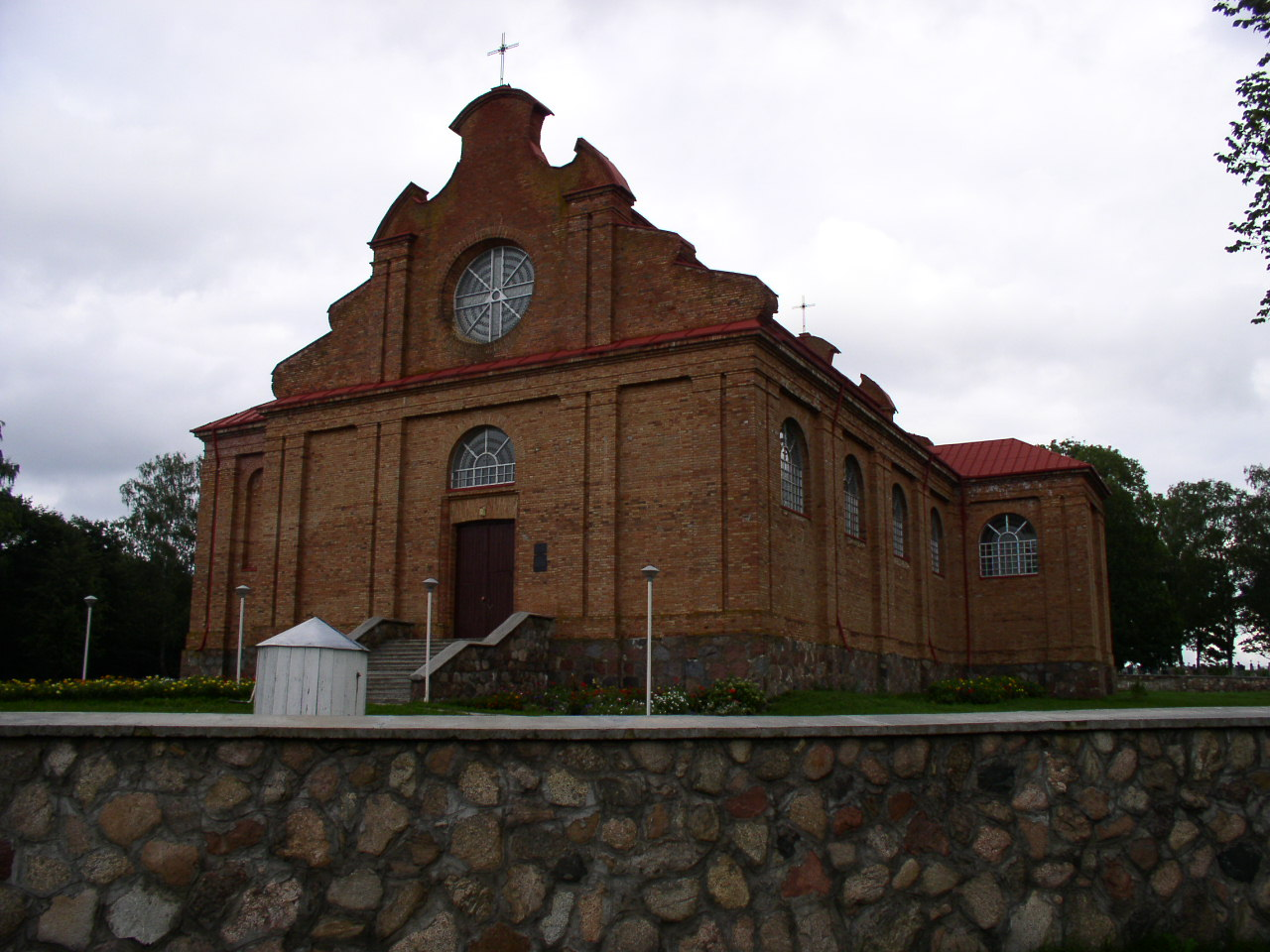
St. Joseph's Church in Naliboki, resistance point of the town's defenders. It was uncompleted during the war.

In the early morning of 8 May 1943, Soviet partisans raided Naliboki. According to Chernyshov's report, the "Dzerzhinsky" unit, the "Bolshevik" unit and the "Suvorov" unit took part in the assault and were commanded by the commander of the "Stalin" brigade. Naliboki's self-defense was outnumbered, with only 26 rifles and two light machine guns. However, the policemen managed to barricade themselves in the station, located in an unfinished church building, and retreated in the evening after the Soviet partisans left, despite heavy losses.

A few of the Soviet attackers, including a political officer, were killed by the defenders. Polish men were dragged from their homes and shot individually or in small groups. Mass looting followed. Many farmhouses were set on fire. Also killed during the Soviet attack were three Polish women, several teenagers, and a ten-year-old boy. The town's church was set on fire, along with the public school, fire station, and post office. The raid took two to three hours.

The Soviet commander reported to the NKVD the killing of 250 people, the capture of weapons, the rounding up of 100 cows and 78 horses, and the destruction of a German garrison. In reality, the number of victims was lower (now estimated at 129), no Germans were present or killed, and only one Belarusian auxiliary policeman happened to be sleeping in the town on the night of the attack.

== Aftermath ==
Naliboki was almost completely burned down on 6 August 1943, during the pacification carried out by German troops, as part of the punitive Operation Hermann. Its purpose was to destroy the partisan movement, as well as the villages in the Naliboki forest that supported it. In Naliboki alone, 100 people were killed and more than 1,500 deported to forced labor in Germany.

The Soviet NKVD persecuted the pro-German Belarusian populace at least as badly as the anti-Nazi Poles. Thousands of Belarusian collaborators were killed, including teachers, local administrators and members of the Belarusian Auxiliary Police, and dozens of Polish communities were destroyed. Resulting from this, on at least ten occasions the Nowogródek District division (pl) of the Armia Krajowa attempted to negotiate with the Soviet partisans to stop the attacks on hapless villages. Those attempts were futile. In May 1943, the entire Polish delegation was murdered by the Soviets in the powiat of Szczuczyn and the pacifications continued. Apart from Naliboki, other massacres were committed in Koniuchy (Koniuchy massacre), Szczepki, Prowżały, Kamień, Niewoniańce, Izabelin, Kaczewo, Babińsk, and Ługomowicze, including murders around Dokudów and near the Narocz and Kromań lakes, as well as in Derewno.

Home Army officer and commander of the self-defense in Naliboki, Eugeniusz Klimowicz, was accused by the Communist prosecutors after the war of "murdering Soviet partisans" because during the Naliboki massacre the defending Poles managed to shoot several attackers. As a "Fascist-Hitlerite criminal", he was sentenced to death in 1951, reduced to life imprisonment. The sentence was overturned in 1957.

In the cemetery in Naliboki, near the church, which was rebuilt in the 1990s, there is a monument with an inscription in Polish: "In tribute to 127 residents of Naliboki murdered on May 8, 1943 Parishioners". Belarusian authorities have refused to clearly identify the perpetrators of the crime.

== Unsubstantiated claims of Jewish perpetrators ==
The allegation that Jewish partisans were among the perpetrators of the murder appeared in 1993 in the memoirs of Wacław Nowicki, who had obtained the information from witnesses. This was later picked up by Polish and Belarusian historians. In February 2001, the Canadian Polish Congress (CPC), a right-wing society for Polish emigres in Canada, successfully petitioned the Polish Institute of National Remembrance (IPN) to open an investigation into ethnic crimes committed by Soviet partisans — especially Jewish groups — across the region, including the Koniuchy massacre and Naliboki massacre.

Contemporaneously, the right-wing Catholic daily Nasz Dziennik published a series of articles on the Naliboki massacre, all blaming the Jews; Hanna Maria Kwiatkowska perceives the sudden focus as a balancing counterweight to the culpability of Poles in the Jedwabne pogrom whose details were coming to light. A local branch of the CPC even claimed, wrongly, that in Naliboki "Jewish partisans [had] boast[ed] of killing [...] 130 Poles". Jan Grabowski concludes that these insinuations about Jewish involvement were the product of a right-wing political climate.

The IPN investigation recorded multiple witnesses supporting the presence of Jewish combatants, especially, the Bielski partisans, during the massacre; however, IPN did not find any documentary evidence to support such accusations. Archival records rejected the presence of Bielski's unit in the area; they would move to the vicinity of Naliboki months later, in July 1943. In conclusion, the IPN held the massacre to have been carried out by partisans from the "Stalin" brigade, accompanied by those from the "Dzerzhinsky", "Bolshevik", and "Suvorov" units.

== See also ==
- List of massacres in Belarus
- List of massacres in Poland
- Skidel revolt

== Bibliography ==
- Kwiatkowska, Hanna Maria (2008). Conflict of images. Conflict of memories. Jewish themes in the Polish right-wing nationalistic press in the light of articles from Nasz Dziennik 1998-2007 (PDF) (PhD thesis). Department of Hebrew and Jewish Studies, University College London.
- Musiał, Bogdan (2009). Sowjetische Partisanen 1941-1944: Mythos und Wirklichkeit (in German). Ferdinand Schöningh.
- Semczyszyn, Magdalena (2021). "Żydzi w sowieckich oddziałach partyzanckich na północno-wschodnich terenach Drugiej RP 1941–1944 – zarys problematyki" [Jews in Soviet partisan units in the northeastern territories of the Second Polish Republic 1941-1944 - outline of subject matter]. Zagłada Żydów. Studia i Materiały. 17.
