= Alexander Zeisal Bielski =

Leader of the Bielski partisans (1912–1995)

- Bielski c. 1945–1948
- Born: 19 October 1912; Stankiewicze, near Navahrudak, Russian Empire
- Died: 18 August 1995 (aged 82); New York City, United States
- Other name: Zus Bielski
- Known for: Bielski partisans
- Spouses: Cyrl Borowski (m. 1939; died 1941) Sonia Boldo (m. 1941)
- Children: 4
- Relatives: Tuvia Bielski (brother); Asael Bielski (brother); Aron Bielski (brother)

Alexander Zeisal "Zus" Bielski (19 October 1912 – 18 August 1995) was a leader of the Bielski partisans who rescued approximately 1,200 Jews fleeing from the Nazi Holocaust during World War II.

== Biography ==
Alexander "Zus" Bielski was born in 1912 in the Russian Empire. He grew up in the only Jewish family in Stankiewicze. The small village in Western Belarus is located between towns of Lida and Navahrudak, both of which housed Jewish ghettos during World War II. He was the son of David and Beila Bielski, who had twelve children: ten boys and two girls.

== World War II ==
When Operation Barbarossa broke out, Tuvia, Zus, and Asael were called up by their army units to fight against the Nazi German occupiers. Owing to so much chaos the units disbanded. They fled to Stankiewicze, where their parents lived. In July 1941, a German army unit arrived in Stankiewicze, and Jewish residents were moved to the Nowogródek ghetto. Zus, along with his brothers Tuvia, Asael, and Aron, managed to flee to the nearby forest after their parents and other family members were killed in the ghetto in December 1941.

Other refugees joined them and eventually formed a large partisan group. They hid in the forests of Belarus throughout World War II, led by the Bielskis. Zus, along with his brothers Tuvia, Aron, and Asael, managed to save 1,236 Jews. Zus left the partisans for the Red Army for a few months. Today, the descendants of those who were saved number over 10,000. Zus' first wife, Cyrl Borowski, and infant daughter were murdered by the Nazis. One of the refugees Zus rescued was 18-year-old Sonia Boldo, who he would later marry.

== Later life ==
After the war, Zus initially moved to Israel, but he left for New York City in 1956. There, he built his wealth by owning a large fleet of taxi cabs and a trucking company with his brother Tuvia.

He died of cardiac arrest in Brooklyn at age 82. He and his wife Sonia had three sons: David, Jay, and Zvi. Jay served in the IDF as a volunteer during the 1973 war, and Zvi (June 1, 1952 – April 14, 2013) served in the Israeli paratroopers during the Lebanon incursion. Matthew and Elan, Jay's sons, served in a Special Forces unit within the elite Israeli paratroopers.

== Legacy ==
Liev Schreiber portrayed Zus Bielski in the film Defiance (2008).
