= Belarusian resistance during World War II =

Belarusian combatant organisations opposed to Nazi Germany

Belarusian resistance
- Part of the Eastern Front of World War II
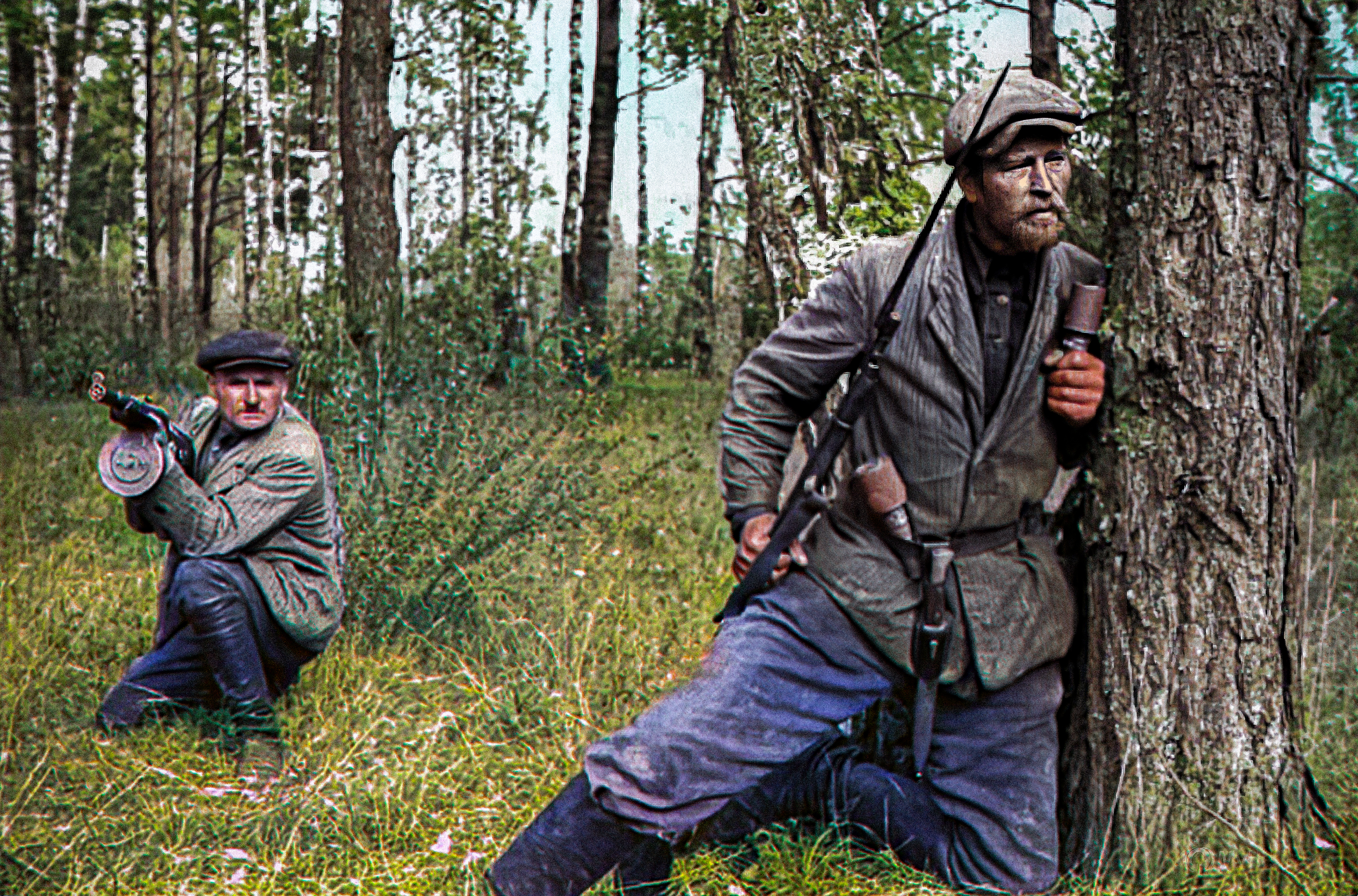
- Soviet partisans in Belarus, 1943
Date	1941–1944
Location	German-occupied Byelorussia
Result	Partisan victory
Territorial changes	German retreat from Byelorussia

Belligerents
Soviet partisans: (Byelorussian Soviet Socialist Republic) Belarusian partisans; Ukrainian partisans; Supported by: Soviet Union Nationalist underground in Western Belorussia (mostly before 1943): Polish Underground State • UAS (1941–1942) • Armia Krajowa (1942–1944) • NAF (1942–1944) • Bataliony Chłopskie Polessye Sich (1942–1943); UPA 1942–1943) Belarusian nationalists • Belarusian SD (1941) • BPPM 1941–1944 Jewish partisans • Bielski partisans (1942–1944) • Fareynikte Partizaner Organizatsye (1942–1944)	Nazi Germany: Wehrmacht; LVF (1942–1944); Waffen-SS; Dirlewanger Brigade; Collaborationist organisations and formations: Belarusian • Belarusian Polizei • Belarusian Council of confidences (1943) • Belarusian Central Council (1943–1944) • Belarusian People's self-help • Belarusian corps of self-defence (1942–1943) • Novogrudsk escadron (1943–1944) • Belarusian Home Defence (1944); Polish • Polish Polizei; Ukrainian • Ukrainian Polizei; Baltic collaborators • Lithuanian Polizei • Latvian Polizei • 15th Waffen Grenadier Division of the SS (1st Latvian) • Estonian Polizei • 3rd Estonian SS Volunteer Brigade (1943–1944); Russian collaborators • Zuyev Republic • 1st Russian National Brigade SS "Druzhina" (1941–1943) • RNNA (1942–1943) • Kaminski Brigade (1943–1944) • Cossack Stan (1943–1944) • Muravyov's Battalion (1943–1944) Nationalist underground in Western Belorussia (mostly from 1943): Polish Underground State • Armia Krajowa (after 1943) • NAF (after 1943) Polessye Sich (1941–1942, 1943); UPA 1943–1944) Belarusian nationalists • Belarusian SD (1941) • BPPM (1941–1944)

Commanders and leaders
Panteleimon Ponomarenko; Kiril Mazurov; Vasily Kozlov (politician); Roman Machulsky; Joseph Belsky; Kirill Orlovsky; Vladimir Lobanok; Konstantin Zaslonov †; Stanislovas Vaupšas; Minay Shmyryov; Alexander Dalidovich; Fyodor Pavlovsky; Vasily Korzh; Aleksey Kleshchev; Pyotr Masherov; Andreii Volynets; Boris Bulat; Ilya Kozhar; Sydir Kovpak; Pyotr Vershigora; Alexander Saburov; Oleksiy Fedorov; Vladimir Gil † (from 1943)	Wilhelm Kube X; Curt von Gottberg; Walter Schimana; Erich Ehrlinger; Erich Koch; Erich von dem Bach-Zelewski; Hans-Adolf Prützmann; Oskar Dirlewanger; Vacłaŭ Ivanoŭski †; Radasłaŭ Astroŭski; Jury Sobołeŭski; Ivan Yermachenka; Francišak Kušal; Barys Rahula; Yevhen Pobihushchyi-Ren; Roman Shukhevych; Vladimir Gil (before 1943); Vladimir Boyarsky; Bronislav Kaminski; Sergey Vasilyevich Pavlov †; Timofeii Domanov

Strength
12,000 (end of 1941); 374,000 (1944)	Unknown

Casualties and losses
45,000	125,000 killed (Note: Servicemen of the occupation troops, collaborators, officials of the occupation administration, armed colonists and collaborators have been killed.)

Belarusian resistance during World War II opposed Nazi Germany from 1941 until 1944. Byelorussia was one of the Soviet republics occupied following Operation Barbarossa. The term Belarusian partisans may refer to Soviet-formed irregular military groups fighting Germany, but has also been used to refer to the disparate independent groups who also fought as guerrillas at the time, including Jewish groups (such as the Bielski partisans and Fareynikte Partizaner Organisatsye), Polish groups (such as the Home Army), and nationalist Belarusian forces opposed to Germany.

== Pro-Soviet resistance ==
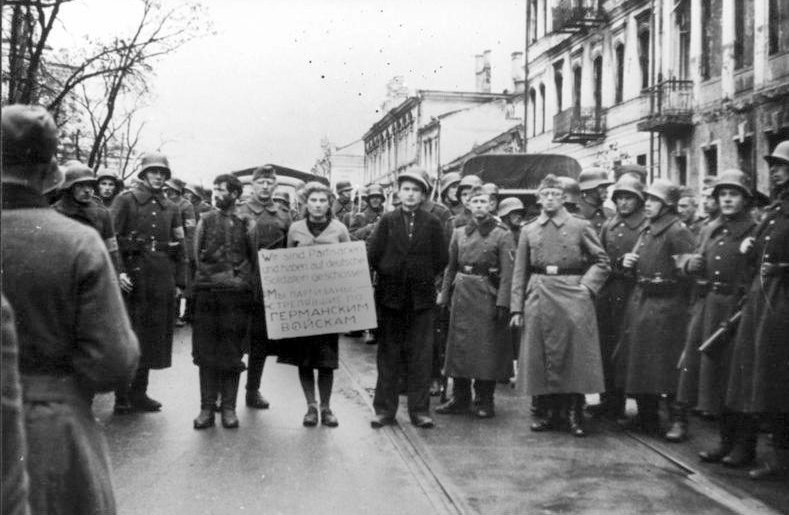
Masha Bruskina with fellow resistance members before hanging, Minsk, October 26, 1941.

After the victories of the Wehrmacht against the Red Army in 1941, Belarus was one of the Soviet republics that came under control of Nazi Germany (Operation Barbarossa). The official government of the occupation forces was established on August 23, 1941, under the direction of Wilhelm Kube, the German administrator of the Generalbezirk Weißruthenien. The German pacification operations were able to curb partisan activity significantly throughout the summer and fall of 1941. The Belarusian Auxiliary Police was established by the Nazis in July 1941 and deployed to murder operations particularly in February–March 1942. The resistance movement first consisted of cut-off Soviet soldiers, some civilians began joining them around the summer of 1942. From that time until the end of the year, the Central Committee of the Communist Party (Bolsheviks) of Byelorussia formed courses and offices helping those wishing to fight the Nazi Government.

Already in July 1941, an underground group in the Vesnitsky village council of the Ushachsky district was created by the head of the Lesinsky outpost of the 13th Berezinsky border detachment (Russian: 13-го Березинского погранотряда), Lieutenant Kudryavtsev. Underground workers established relations with the population, conducted oral campaigns among them, calling for a struggle against the invaders, and helped unite the locals. Soon it was decided to create a partisan detachment and begin an open armed struggle. The Nazis tracked down Kudryavtsev and one night surrounded the house where he was resting and killed him.

The first partisan detachments were composed mostly of Red Army personnel, but also included local people. They were commanded by officers of the Red Army, the Soviet secret police NKVD or local Soviet or Communist apparatchiks. These detachments dated back to the early days of World War II: the detachment Starasyel'ski of major Dorodnykh in Zhabinka district (June 23, 1941), the detachment of Vasily Korzh in Pinsk on June 26, 1941 and others. The first awards to the partisans with order of Hero of the Soviet Union occurred on August 6, 1941; they were given to detachment commanders Pavlovsky and Bumazhkov.

Throughout 1941, the core of the partisan movement consisted of the straggling remains of the Red Army units destroyed in Operation Barbarossa, personnel of the destruction battalions, and local Communist Komsomol and Soviet apparatchiks. The most common unit of the period was the detachment. The "seed" partisan detachments, diversionist and organizational groups were actively formed and inserted into German-occupied territories beginning in the summer of 1941. Urban underground groups were formed as a force complementing the activities of partisan units, which operated in rural terrains.

=== Organization ===
As a controlling body, a network of underground Communist structures was actively developed on German-occupied territories, and it received an influx of specially picked Communist activists. By the end of 1941, more than two thousand partisan detachments (with more than 90,000 personnel) operated in German-occupied territories. However, the activities of the partisan forces weren't centrally coordinated or logistically provided for until spring of 1942. In order to coordinate partisan operations, the Central Headquarters of the Partisan Movement, headed by Panteleimon Ponomarenko, the Russian-born former head of the Byelorussian Soviet Socialist Republic, was organised on May 30, 1942. The Staff had its liaisons in the Military Councils of the fronts and armies. The territorial Staffs were subsequently created, dealing with the partisan movement in the respective Soviet Republics and in the occupied provinces of the Soviet Russia.

Later, the NKVD, SMERSH and GRU began to train special groups of future partisans (effectively special forces units) in the rear and dropping them in the occupied territories. The candidates for these groups were chosen among volunteers from regular Red Army, the NKVD's Internal Troops, and Soviet sportsmen. When dropped behind German lines, the groups were to organize and guide the local self-established partisan units. Radio operators and intelligence gathering officers were the essential members of each group since amateur fighters could not be trusted with these tasks. Some commanders of these special units (like Dmitry Medvedev) later became well-known partisan leaders.

=== Logistics difficulties ===
The Soviet authorities considered Belarus to be of the utmost importance to the development of the Soviet partisan war from the very beginning. The main factors were its geography, with many dense forests and swamps, and its strategic position on the communications going from West to Moscow. In fact, Belorussian Communist bodies in the Eastern provinces of Belarus began to organize and facilitate organization of the partisan units on the day after the first directive issuing (directives No.1 of 1941-07-30 and No.2 of 1941-07-01). By the Soviet estimates, in August 1941 about 231 detachments were operating already. The "seed" units, formed and inserted into Belarus, totalled 437 by the end of the 1941, comprising more than 7.2 thousand personnel. However, as the frontline moved further away, the logistical conditions steadily worsened for the partisan units, as the resources ran out, and there was no wide-scale support from over the frontline until March 1942.

One outstanding difficulty was the lack of radio communication, which wasn't addressed until April 1942. The support of the local people was also insufficient. So, for several months, partisan units in Belarus were virtually left to themselves. Especially difficult for the partisans was the winter of 1941–1942, with severe shortages in ammunition, medicine and supplies. The actions of partisans were generally uncoordinated. In the circumstances, the German pacification operations in Summer and Fall 1941 were able to curb the partisan activity significantly. Many units went underground, and generally, in the late Fall 1941—early 1942, the partisan units weren't undertaking the significant military operations, limiting themselves to sorting out the organizational problems, building up the logistics support and gaining influence with the local people. By the incomplete data, in the end of the 1941, 99 partisan detachments and about 100 partisan groups operated in Belarus. In Winter 1941–1942, 50 partisan detachments and about 50 underground organization and groups operated in Belarus. By the incomplete Russian data, in the end of the 1941, 99 partisan detachments and about 100 partisan groups operated in Soviet Belarus. In Winter 1941–1942, 50 partisan detachments and about 50 underground organisations and groups operated there. In the period (1941-12-01), the German guard forces in the Army Group "Centre" rear comprised 4 security divisions, 2 SS brigades, 260 companies of different branches of service. In August 1941, about 231 partisan detachments were operating in the Byelorussian Soviet Socialist Republic. The units totalled 437 by the end of the 1941, comprising more than 7,200 personnel.

In the period of December 1941, the German guard forces in the Army Group "Centre" rear comprised 4 security divisions, 2 SS brigades, 260 companies of different branches of service.

The Moscow Battle turned the tide in the morale of the partisans and of the local people in general. However, the real turning point in the development of the partisan movement in Belarus, and, in fact, on the German-occupied territories in general, came in the course of the Soviet Winter 1942 offensive.

=== 1942, Vitebsk Gate ===
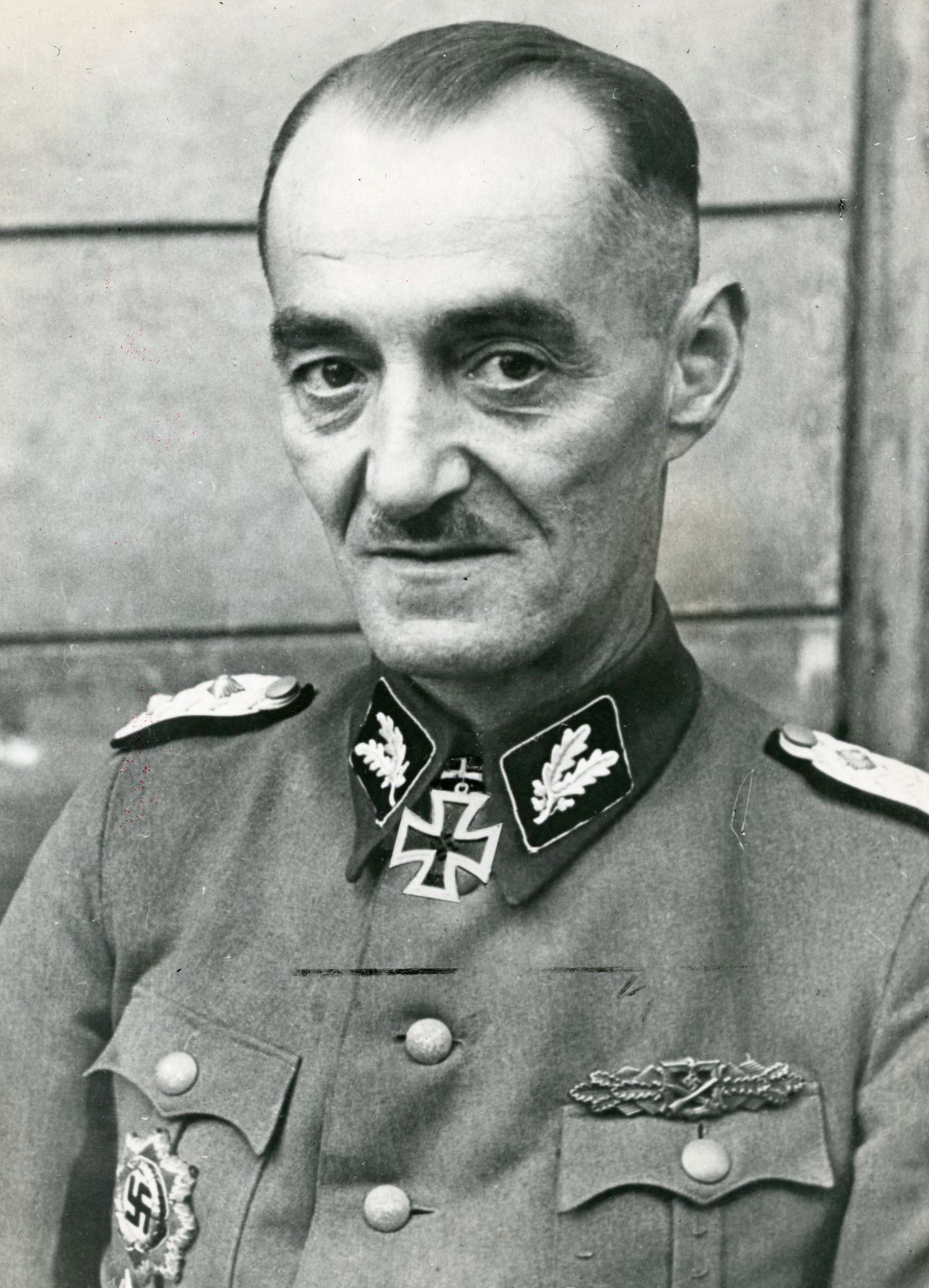
Oskar Dirlewanger as an SS-Oberführer, 1944. In Belarus, the SS-Sonderbataillon "Dirlewanger" came under the command of Central Russia's Höherer SS- und Polizeiführer, Erich von dem Bach Zelewski. The "Dirlewanger" resumed anti-partisan duties in this area, working in cooperation with the Kaminski Brigade for the first time. Its conduct in the Soviet Union, rather than improving, worsened and atrocities were a daily occurrence. It is estimated that 200 villages were burned and 120,000 civilians were killed during the actions involving the Dirlewanger in Belarus 1942–1944.

The Germans treated the local population abysmally (with the notable exception of the fraction of the civil administration headed by Wilhelm Kube), maintained kolkhozes in East and restored land possessions in West, collecting heavy food taxes, rounded up and sent young people to work in Germany. Overwhelmingly, Jews and even small-scale Soviet activists would feel more secure in the partisan ranks. The direct boost to the partisan numbers were the Red Army POWs of the local origin, who were let out "to the homes" in Fall 1941, but ordered by Germans to return to the concentration camps in March 1942.

In the Spring 1942, the aggregation of the smaller partisan units into brigades began, prompted by the experience of the first year of war. The coordination, numerical buildup, structural rework and now established logistical feed all translated to the greatly increased partisan units military capability, which showed, e.g., in the increased number of diversions on the railroads, reaching hundreds of engines and thousands of cars destroyed by the end of the year.

In 1942, the terror campaign against the territorial administration, which was manned by the local people ("collaborators and traitors") was additionally emphasized. This resulted, however, in the definite split of the local people's sympathies, resulting in the beginning of the organisation of the anti-partisan units with native personnel in 1942. By the November 1942, Soviet partisan units in Belarus numbered about 47,000 personnel.

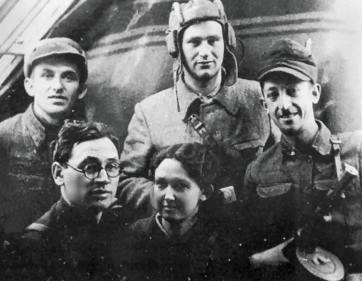
A Belarusian Jewish partisan squad: the Chkalov Brigade, Belarus, 1943.

The turning point in the development of the Soviet partisan movement came with the opening of the Vitsyebsk gate in February 1942. The partisan units were included in the overall Soviet strategical developments shortly after that, and the centralized organizational and logistical support had been organized, with Gate's existence being the very important facilitating factor.

By the November 1942, Soviet partisan units in Belarus numbered about 47.3 thousand personnel.

=== 1943 ===
In January 1943, out of 56,000 partisan personnel, 11,000 were operating in the West Belarus, which was 3.5 less per 10 thousand local people than in the East, and even more so (up to 5–6 factor) if accounting for the much more efficient evacuation measures in the East in 1941. This discrepancy wouldn't be sufficiently explained by the German treatment of local people, nor by the quick German advance in 1941, nor by the social circumstances then existing in these regions. There is strong evidence, that this was decision of the central Soviet authorities, who abstained from the greater buildup of the Partisan forces in West Belarus, and let Polish underground military structures to grow unopposed in these lands in 1941–1942, in the context of relations with the Polish government in exile of Sikorsky. Certain level of military cooperation, imposed by the respective commands, was noted between Soviet partisans and the Home Army; the people of Polish nationality were, to a degree, exempted from the terror campaign in 1942. After the break of diplomatic relations between USSR and Polish government in exile in April 1943, the situation changed radically. From this moment on, AK was treated as hostile military force.

The build-up of the Soviet partisan force in the Western Belarus was ordered and implemented during 1943, with 9 brigades, 10 detachments and 15 operational groups transferred from the Eastern to Western lands, effectively tripling the Partisan force there (to 36.8 thousand in December 1943). It is estimated that c. 10–12 thousand personnel were transferred, and about same number came from the local volunteers. The build-up of the military force was complemented by the ensuing build-up of the underground Communist Party structures and propaganda activity.

Soviet victory at the Battle of Stalingrad, certain curbing of the terror campaign (actually since December 1942, formally in February 1943) and amnesty promised to repenting collaborators were a significant factors in the 1943 growth of the Soviet partisan forces. Desertions from the ranks of the German-controlled Hilfspolizei and military formations strengthened, with sometimes whole units coming over to Soviet partisan side – Volga Tartars battalion (900 personnel, February 1943), Gil-Rodionov 1st Russian People's brigade of the SS (2500 personnel, August 1943). Summarily, about 7 thousand people of miscellaneous anti-Soviet formations joined the Soviet partisan force. About 1.9 thousand specialists and commanders were inserted in the Belarusian lands in 1943. However, the local people comprised the core of the personnel influx in the Soviet partisan force.

In late May 1943, Uderzeniowe Bataliony Kadrowe, with permission of the headquarters of the Home Army, concentrated its forces (200 men) around Wyszkow. The Germans soon found out about it and surrounded the Poles. A skirmish ensued, in which 4 Poles were killed and 8 wounded. German losses were estimated at 15 killed and 22 wounded. Those who were not caught, divided themselves into two groups and headed north, to Bezirk Bialystok. On June 11, 1943, the UBK forces under Major Stanislaw Pieciul (Radecki) of the 4th Battalion engaged the Germans near the village of Pawly (Bielsk Podlaski County). 25 Poles and approximately 40 Germans died.

In July 1943 the Uderzeniowe Bataliony Kadrowe units, active in Bezirk Bialystok, consisted of five Battalions. Altogether, there were 200 fighters, and during a number of skirmishes with the Germans (including the 1943 Polish underground raid on East Prussia), 138 of them were killed. These heavy losses were criticized by the headquarters of the Home Army, who claimed that the UBK was profusely using lives of young Polish soldiers. On August 17, 1943, upon the order of General Tadeusz Bór-Komorowski, the UBK was included into the Home Army. Soon afterwards, all battalions were transferred to the area of Novogrudok.

By autumn 1943, the partisan force in BSSR totalled about 153,700, and by the end 1943 about 122,000, with about 30,800 put behind the frontline in the course of liberation of eastern parts of BSSR (in the end of 1943). After the liberation of BSSR, about 180,000 partisans joined the Soviet Army in 1944.

During the 1941—1944 period, the turnaround in the Soviet partisan force in Belarus was about 374,000, about 70,000 in urban underground, and about 400,000 in the reserve of the partisan force.

Among Soviet partisans in Belarus were people of 45 different ethnic backgrounds and 4,000 foreigners (including 3,000 Poles, 400 Czechs and Slovaks, 300 Yugoslavians, etc.). Around 65% of Belarusian partisans were local people.

On September 22, 1943, Kube was assassinated in his Minsk home by a bomb as part of Operation Blow-Up; the bomb was placed by a Soviet partisan Yelena Mazanik, a Belarusian woman who had managed to find employment in Kube's household as a maid and presumably became his mistress in order to assassinate him.

=== 1943–1944 ===
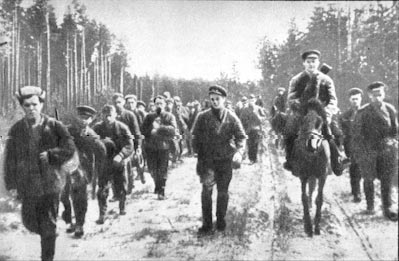
Soviet partisans on the road in Belarus, 1944

The partisan movement was so strong that by 1943–44 there were entire regions in occupied Belarus, where Soviet authority was re-established deep inside the German held territories. There were even partisan kolkhozes that were raising crops and livestock to produce food for the partisans. During the battles for liberation of Belarus, partisans were considered the fourth Belarusian front. As early as the spring of 1942 the Soviet partisans were able to effectively harass German troops and significantly hamper their operations in the region.

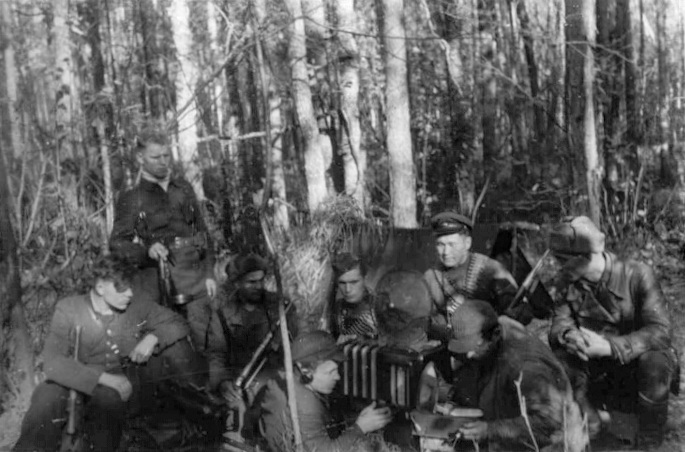
Partisans of the Frunze detachment listening to Sovinformburo reports on the radio

The build-up of the Soviet partisan force in the West Belarus was ordered and implemented during 1943, with nine brigades, 10 detachments and 15 operational groups transferred from the Eastern to Western lands, effectively tripling the Partisan force there (to 36,000 in December 1943). It is estimated that c. 10,000–12,000 personnel were transferred, and about same number came from the local volunteers. The build-up of the military force was complemented by the ensuing reconstruction of underground Communist Party structures and propaganda activity.

Yitzhak Arad was active in the Vilna Ghetto underground movement from 1942 to 1944. In February 1943, he joined the Belarusian partisans in the Vilna Battalion of the Markov Brigade, a primarily non-Jewish unit in which he had to contend with antisemitism. Apart from a foray infiltrating the Vilna Ghetto in April 1943 to meet with underground leader Abba Kovner, he stayed with the partisans until the end of the war, fighting the Germans and their collaborators near Lake Narach.

The Bielski partisans' activities were aimed at the Nazis and their collaborators, such as Belarusian volunteer policemen or local inhabitants who had betrayed or killed Jews. They also conducted sabotage missions. The Nazi regime offered a reward of 100,000 Reichsmarks for assistance in the capture of Tuvia Bielski, and in 1943, led major clearing operations against all partisan groups in the area. Some of these groups suffered major casualties, but the Bielski partisans fled safely to a more remote part of the forest, and continued to offer protection to the non-combatants among their band.

During the process of reorganization of the Novogrudok area of the Home Army, the Uderzeniowe Bataliony Kadrowe units created a battalion, which became part of the 77th Infantry Regiment of the Home Army, under Boleslaw Piasecki. In February 1944 the battalion had around 700 soldiers (some sources put the number at around 500). The unit took part in the Operation Tempest, fighting the Germans around Lida and Vilnius (see: Wilno Uprising), where it suffered heavy losses.

The 5th Wileńska Brigade of the Home Army, commanded by Zygmunt Szendzielarz (Łupaszko), fought against the German army and SS units in the area of southern Wilno Voivodeship, but was also frequently attacked by the Soviet Partisans paradropped in the area by the Red Army. In April 1944, Zygmunt Szendzielarz was arrested by Lithuanian police and handed over to the German Gestapo. Łupaszko escaped or was released in unknown circumstances at the end of April. In reprisal actions his brigade captured several dozen German officials and sent several threatening letters to Gestapo but it remains unknown if and how these contributed to his release.

On June 12, 1944, General Tadeusz Bór-Komorowski, Commander-in-Chief of the Home Army, issued an order to prepare a plan of liberating Vilnius from German hands. The Home Army districts of Vilnius and Novogrudok planned to take control of the city before Soviet forces could reach it. The Commander of the Home Army district in Vilnius, General Aleksander Krzyżanowski "Wilk", decided to regroup all the partisan units in the north-eastern part of Poland for the assault, both from inside the city and from the outside.

On June 23, two squads of the 5th Wileńska Brigade, commanded by "Maks" and "Rakoczy", attacked the Lithuanian policemen in Dubingiai.

The starting date was set to July 7. Approximately 12,500 Home Army soldiers attacked the German garrison and managed to seize most of the city centre. Heavy street fighting in the outskirts lasted until July 14. In Wilno's eastern suburbs, the Home Army units cooperated with reconnaissance groups of the Soviet 3rd Belorussian Front.

=== Soviets enter ===
General Krzyżanowski wanted to group all of the partisan units into a re-created Polish 19th Infantry Division. However, the advancing Red Army entered the city on July 15, and the NKVD started to intern all Polish soldiers.

In August the commander of all Home Army units in the Wilno area, Gen. Aleksander Krzyżanowski "Wilk" ordered all six brigades under his command to prepare for the Operation Tempest – a plan for an all-national uprising against the German forces occupying Poland. In what became known as the Operation Ostra Brama, the V Brigade was to attack the Wilno suburb of Zwierzyniec in cooperation with the advancing units of the 3rd Belorussian Front. However, for fear of being arrested with his units by the NKVD and killed on the spot, Zygmunt Szendzielarz – Łupaszko – decided to disobey the orders and instead moved his unit to central Poland. The Operation Ostra Brama was a success and the city was liberated by Polish soldiers, but the Polish commander was then arrested by the Soviets and the majority of his soldiers were sent to Gulags and sites of detention in the Soviet Union.

It is uncertain why Szendzielarz was not court-martialled for desertion. It is highly probable that in fact his unit was moved out of the battlefield by Gen. "Wilk" himself, due to the fact that Łupaszka's unit has been long involved in fights with the Soviet partisans and he did not want to provoke the Red Army. Regardless, after crossing into Podlaskie and Białystok area in October, the brigade continued the struggle against withdrawing Germans in the ranks of the "Białystok Home Army Area". After the region was overrun by the Soviets, Łupaszka's unit remained in the forests and Łupaszka decided to wait for the outcome of Russo-Polish talks held by the Polish Government in Exile. At the same time the unit was reorganized and captured enough equipment to fully arm 600 men with machine guns and machine pistols.

After the governments of the United Kingdom and United States broke the pacts with Poland and accepted the Polish Committee of National Liberation as the provisional government of Poland, Łupaszka restarted the hostilities – this time against a new oppressor, in the ranks of Wolność i Niezawisłość organization. However, after several successful actions against the NKVD units in the area of Białowieża Forest, it became apparent that such actions would result in a total destruction of his unit.

During the battles for liberation of Belarus, partisans considered the fourth Byelorussian front. After the liberation of BSSR, about 180,000 partisans joined the Soviet Army in 1944.

During the 1941–1944 period, the turnaround in the Soviet partisan force in Belarus was about 374,000, about 70,000 in urban underground, and about 400,000 in the reserve of the partisan force. Among Soviet partisans in Belarus were people of 45 different ethnic backgrounds and 4,000 foreigners (including 3,000 Poles, 400 Czechs and Slovaks, 300 Yugoslavians, etc.). Around 65% of Belarusian partisans were local people.

As part of the Nazis' effort to combat the enormous Belarusian resistance during World War II, special units of local collaborationists were trained by the SS's Otto Skorzeny to infiltrate the Soviet rear. In 1944 thirty Belarusians, known as "Čorny Kot" ("Black Cat") and led by Michał Vituška, were airdropped by the Luftwaffe behind the lines of the Red Army, which had already liberated Belarus during Operation Bagration. They experienced some initial success due to disorganization in the rear of the Red Army, and some other German-trained Belarusian nationalist units also slipped through the Białowieża Forest in 1945. According to most accounts, Vituška was hanged by Soviet forces during the war, though others claim he escaped along with several other collaborationist leaders.

=== Partisan operations ===
- Vasiliy Korzh raid, Autumn 1941 – March 23, 1942. 1000 km raid of a partisan formation in the Mińsk and Pińsk Woblast of Belarus.
- Battle of Briańsk forests, May 1942. Partisan battle against the Nazi punitive expedition that included 5 infantry divisions, military police, 120 tanks and aviation.
- The destruction of the German garrison in Lenin, September 12, 1942.
- Raid of Sydor Kowpak, October 26 – November 29, 1942. Raid in Briańsk forests and Eastern Ukraine.
- Battle of Briańsk forests, May–June 1943. Partisan battle in the Briańsk forests with German punitive expeditions.
- Operation Rails War, August 3 – September 15, 1943. A major operation of partisan formations against the railroad transportation and communications intended to disrupt the German reinforcements and supplies for the Battle of Kursk and later the Battle of Smolensk. It involved concentrated actions by more than 100,000 partisan fighters from Belarus, the Leningrad Oblast, the Kalinin Oblast, the Smolensk Oblast, the Oryol Oblast and Ukraine within an area 1000 km along the front and 750 km wide. Reportedly, more than 230,000 rails were destroyed, along with many bridges, trains and other railroad infrastructure. The operation seriously incapacitated German logistics and was instrumental in the Soviet victory in Kursk battle.
- Operation Concert, September 19 – November 1, 1943. "Concerto" was a major operation of partisan formations against the railroad communications intended to disrupt the German reinforcements and supplies for the Battle of the Dnieper and on the direction of the Soviet offensive in the Smolensk and Homel directions. Partisans from Belarus, Karelia, the Kalinin Oblast, Lithuania, Latvia, Estonia and the Crimea participated in the operations. The area of the operation was 900 km along the front (excluding Karelia and Crimea) and 400 km wide. Despite bad weather that only permitted the airlift of less than a half of the planned supplies, the operation lead to a 35–40% decrease in the railroad capacity in the area of operations. This was critical for the success of Soviet military operations in the autumn of 1943. In Belarus alone the partisans claimed the destruction of more than 90,000 rails along with 1,061 trains, 72 railroad bridges and 58 Axis garrisons. According to the Soviet historiography, Axis losses totaled more than 53,000 soldiers.
- Battle of Połock-Lepel, April 1944. Major battle between Belarusian partisans and German punitive expeditions.
- Battle of Borysów-Begoml, April 22 – May 15, 1944. Major battle between Belarusian partisans and German punitive expeditions.
- Operation Bagration, June 22 – August 19, 1944. Belarusian partisans took major part in the Operation Bagration. They were often considered the fifth front (along with the 1st Baltic Front, 1st Belorussian Front, 2nd Belorussian Front and 3rd Belorussian Front). Upwards of 300,000 partisans took part in the operation.

== Pro-independence resistance ==
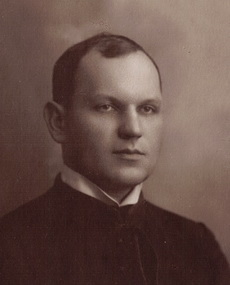
Fr. Vincent Hadleŭski, leader of the Belarusian Independence Party, executed by the Nazis

In 1941, a significant part of the Belarusian pro-independence movement chose to collaborate with the Nazis following mass Soviet repressions in Belarus and discrimination of Belarusians in the Second Polish Republic throughout the preceding decades. However, as the war progressed, parts of the collaboration movement became less loyal to the Germans.

Germans reacted with repressions. The Catholic priest Vincent Hadleŭski, who was the leader of the Belarusian Independence Party, was arrested by the German police on December 24, 1942, and executed in the Maly Trostenets extermination camp.

== Jewish forces ==
During the same period, Jewish residents of Belarus also took part in partisan activities. The units, based on family camps, was devised by Tuvia Bielski with his brothers in Western Belarus. Based from the forests near the Neman River, the family units was home to mostly women, children and elderly. The men who were able to carry weapons either guarded the camps or took part in partisan activities. While the main purpose of the camps was to shelter Belarusian Jews and create villages to survive, there were some camps that were set up to militarily combat the occupation government. One group, from 1941 until 1944, attacked or destroyed bridges, factories, railroad tracks and killed police and Nazi officials. The family camps also prevented the deportation of residents to either labour or concentration camps.

== Polish forces ==
The Polish underground operated over the whole pre-war territory of Poland, including the Polish territories annexed by the Soviet Union. As non-communist Poles tended to consider the Soviets as occupiers even after the German invasion of the Soviet Union there was some conflict between Polish and Soviet partisans.

June 22, 1943, Central Committee of the Belarusian Communist Party received orders in Moscow to destroy the Home Army in Belarus. From then, the number of conflicts between Soviet and non-communist Polish partisans intensified. One Polish unit was arrested December 1, 1943, some Polish officers were executed, the commander major Wacław Pełka transported to Moscow.

== Resistance fighters ==
=== Soviet ===
- Ales Adamovich
- Yitzhak Arad
- Masha Bruskina
- Janka Bryl
- Vassili Kononov
- Pyotr Masherov
- Kirill Mazurov
- Panteleimon Ponomarenko
- Zinaida Portnova
- Ivan Sergeychik
- Petr Shelokhonov
- Arturs Sproģis

=== Polish ===
- Zygmunt Andruszkiewicz
- Stanisław Bułak-Bałachowicz (Note: Bułak-Bałachowicz was an ethnic Belarusian who had previously led the Belarusian People's Republic, but served in the Polish Army during the Second World War.)
- Maria Fedecka
- Henryk Krajewski
- Aleksander Krzyżanowski
- Władysław Liniarski
- Sergiusz Piasecki
- Janusz Szlaski
- Zygmunt Szendzielarz

=== Jewish ===
- Asael Bielski
- Tuvia Bielski
- Alexander Zeisal Bielski
- Abba Kovner
- Shalom Yoran
- Simcha Zorin

== Resistance units ==
- 19th Infantry Division (Poland)
- 29th Infantry Division (Poland)
- Anti-Fascist Military Organisation
- Home Army in Belarus
- Bataliony Chłopskie
- Bielski partisans
- Fareynikte Partizaner Organizatsye
- Leśni
- National Armed Forces
- Polish 30th Infantry Division
- Soviet partisan regiment 1941–1944
- Soviet partisan united formation 1941–1944
- Szare Szeregi
- Uderzeniowe Bataliony Kadrowe

== In popular culture ==
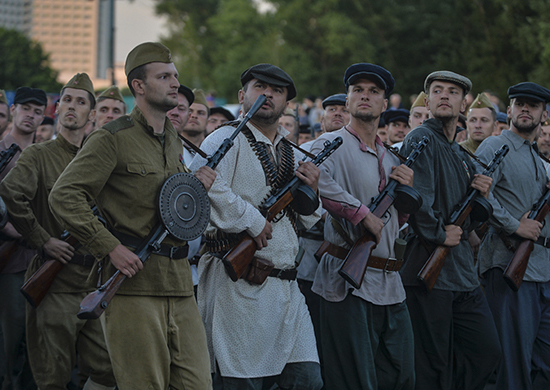
Soldiers depicting Belarusian partisans during a parade in Minsk on the 75th anniversary of the Liberation of Belarus in 2019.

The Belarusian partisans had a large impact on the culture of Belarus. Many partisans, such as Ales Adamovich and Vasil Bykaŭ, later went on to become prolific writers as well as active members of the pro-independence Belarusian Popular Front. Pyotr Masherov, in his position as First Secretary of the Communist Party of Byelorussia, also sought to increase public awareness of Belarusian partisan activities across the Soviet Union.

The Belarusian partisan movement was depicted in the film Come and See, which was written by Adamovich alongside Elem Klimov, and got through Soviet censors with the assistance of Masherov.

In the post-Soviet period, the partisan movement has been evoked both by the government of Alexander Lukashenko and the Belarusian opposition. Lukashenko has drawn comparisons between the opposition and Byelorussian collaborators, who also used pro-independence symbolism. Likewise, the opposition has sought to compare themselves to the partisan movement while comparing pro-government forces to collaborators and German military forces. Most significantly has been the hacktivist group Cyber Partisans, who took their name from the wartime partisans.

Multiple locations in Belarus have been named after the partisans, including Partyzanski District in Minsk and the village of Partizansky in Vileyka District.

== See also ==
- Anti-fascism
- Białowieża Forest
- German occupation of Byelorussia during World War II
- Byelorussian collaboration with Nazi Germany
- The Holocaust in Belarus
- Resistance during World War II
