= Partisan united formation =

During the World War 2, a Soviet partisan united formation (1941–1944) (Belarusian: партызанскае злучэнне united formation), also called a military-operational group or a centre (Belarusian: ваенна-аператыўная група (ВАГ)), became one of the organisational forms which grouped various Soviet partisan units. A united formation linked several of the smaller partisan units - partisan brigades or regiments or detachments - with a view to conducting wide-scale and center-coordinated military operations in the rear of occupying Axis forces.

On the territory of the BSSR about 40 such units developed in the period 1941 to 1944, mostly in 1943.

The higher-level Soviet ruling bodies - the Headquarters of the Partisan Movement, the Belarusian Headquarters of the Partisan Movement, and underground Province, Inter-District and District Committees of the Communist Party - organised units of this kind. Usually, local Communist leaders or higher Red Army officers took command, and the staffs of the respective united formations carried out management functions.

== Sources ==
- А.Л. Манаенкаў. Партызанскае злучэнне ў Вялікую Айчынную вайну // Беларуская энцыклапедыя: У 18 т. Т. 12. — Мінск: БелЭн, 2001. — 560 с. pp. 113–114. ISBN 985-11-0198-2 (т.12). The source x references: Беларусь у Вялікай Айчыннай вайне 1941—1945: Энцыкл. Мн., 1990. С. 398.
