= Rail War =

Soviet partisan campaign to disrupt German supply lines during World War II

- Part of the Eastern Front of World War II
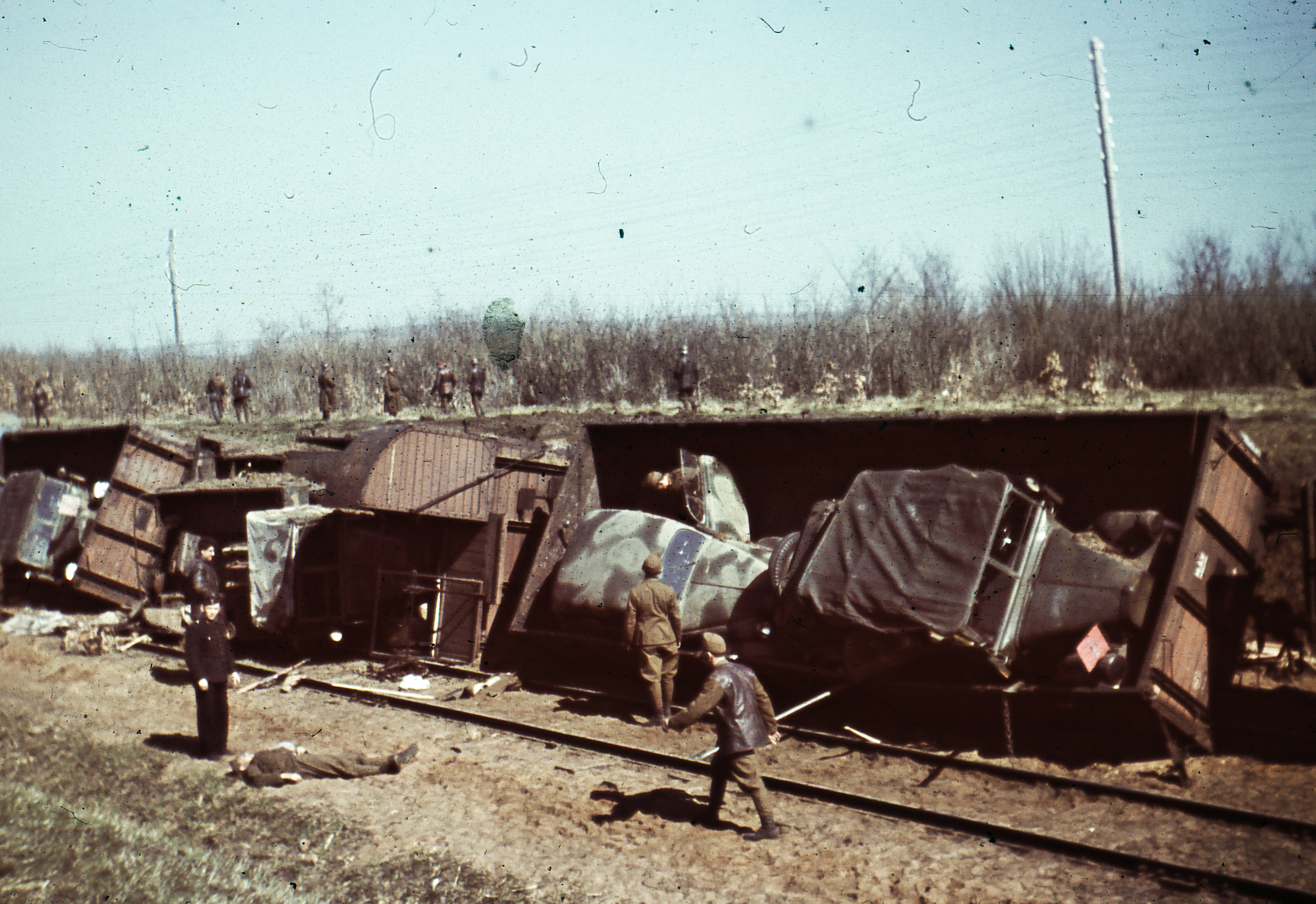
Date	June 1943 – 19 August 1944
Location	German-occupied Byelorussian and Ukrainian Soviet Socialist Republics and Baltic States
Result	Soviet victory: German logistics significantly disrupted

Belligerents
Soviet Union	Germany; Hungary

Commanders and leaders
Panteleimon Ponomarenko; Ilya Starinov	Unknown

Units involved
Soviet partisans; Kampfgruppen des NKFD	Unknown

The Rail War (Russian: Рельсовая война, romanized: Relsovaya voyna; Belarusian: Рэйкавая вайна, romanized: Rejkavaja vajna; Ukrainian: Рейкова війна, romanized: Reikova viina) was the name for a World War II action of Soviet partisans and the German Kampfgruppen des NKFD as their auxiliary force in the Soviet Union, especially in German-occupied Byelorussia and Ukraine. The operations were carried out with the intention of disrupting German logistics via the destruction of rail lines, thus preventing the travel of equipment and manpower to the front.

== Overview ==
In June 1943, the Central Committee of the Communist Party of Byelorussia adopted a resolution calling for the destruction of German rail lines, as well as a general strike of rail workers in order to prevent their reconstruction. It was also to be accompanied by intentional train wrecks and destruction of bridges and stations.

Partisans during the Second World War frequently used tactics recommended by the CPB, but were most frequently used during Operations Rail War, Concert and Bagration. In fact, Ilya Starinov, one of the primary saboteurs, helped organise the latter two operations. Explosives were heavily used during the rail war to destroy German rail lines. Many partisans used explosives which had been developed for the express purpose of the rail war, but others used grenades or improvised explosive devices.

German forces (including SS troops and the Kaminsky Brigade) conducted anti-partisan operations which killed 7000 partisans and left a swathe of blazing villages; Soviet air attacks were made against the partisan hunters. From 19 June 1944 over five nights 40,000 demolitions were laid; disabling mile upon mile of railway track and knocking out precious rolling stock.

Data on the rail war differs between German and Soviet sources, but it is commonly agreed that the partisans caused large disruptions of German logistics. Between 1944 and 1945, medals dedicated to participation in the rail war were awarded in Minsk.

== See also ==
- 2022 rail war in Belarus
- 2022 rail war in Russia
