= Partisan group =

Insurgent military unit

A partisan group (Belarusian: партызанская група) was the smallest organizational form of the Soviet partisan units, the principal organizational form in the initial phase (1941—1942) of the partisan war in the German rear.

The Partisan groups were formed by Soviet and Communist bodies on German-occupied territories and in the Soviet rear. By objective and formation, the partisan groups could be of the special kind (NKVD), or one of several other groups operating on BSSR territory, mostly in 1943—1944, but also in 1942. Partisans could specialize in diversionist, reconnaissance, and other tasks.

In the spring of 1942, the number of partisan groups soared, and the cadres began to be expanded and merged with other partisan detachments. From winter 1941 to spring 1942, 150 detachments were formed from the groups; during the summer of 1942, another 121.

== Sources ==
- А. Л. Манаенкаў. Партызанская група ў Вялікую Айчынную вайну // Беларуская энцыклапедыя: У 18 т. Т. 12. — Мінск: БелЭн, 2001. — 560 с. p. 123. ISBN 985-11-0198-2 (т.12). The source references: Беларусь у Вялікай Айчыннай вайне 1941—1945: Энцыкл. Мн., 1990. С. 452—453.
