= Partisan regiment =

Soviet partisan regiment (Belarusian: партызанскі полк; 1941–1944), was the organisational form of the Soviet partisan units. On the BSSR territory it was used rarely.

The numerical and weapons complement and the chain of command of the partisan regiment were basically the same as of the partisan brigade, with the regiment structure comprising battalions, companies, platoons and sections. The regiment maintained staff, 1 or 2 diversionist platoons, logistics units. The artillery and heavy machine guns could be united in the heavy weapons company or distributed to the companies as the fourth fire platoons. Some of the regiments maintained hospitals, airstrips or airdrop zones.

On the BSSR territory partisan regiments were used rarely (14 regiments, of them 11 in the structures of the military-operational groups and 3 separately).

After the joining with the Red Army, the Belarusian Headquarters of the Partisan Movement re-classified its partisan regiments as brigades.

== Sources ==
- А.Л. Манаенкаў. Партызанскі полк у Вялікую Айчынную вайну // Беларуская энцыклапедыя: У 18 т. Т. 12. — Мінск: БелЭн, 2001. — 560 с. p. 132—133. ISBN 985-11-0198-2 (т.12). The source references: Беларусь у Вялікай Айчыннай вайне 1941—1945: Энцыкл. Мн., 1990. С. 476—479.
