= Soviet partisans =

WWII resistance movements

Soviet partisans were members of resistance movements that fought a guerrilla war against Axis forces during World War II in the Soviet Union, the previously Soviet-occupied territories of interwar Poland in 1941–1945 and eastern Finland. The activity emerged after Nazi Germany's Operation Barbarossa was launched from mid-1941 on. It was coordinated and controlled by the Soviet government and modeled on that of the Red Army.

The partisans made a significant contribution to the war by countering German plans to exploit occupied Soviet territories economically, gave considerable help to the Red Army by conducting systematic attacks against Germany's rear communication network, disseminated political rhetoric among the local population by publishing newspapers and leaflets, and succeeded in creating and maintaining feelings of insecurity among Axis forces.

Soviet partisans also operated on interwar Polish and Baltic territories occupied by the Soviet Union in 1939–1940, but they had significantly less support there and often clashed with local national partisan groups, as well as German-controlled auxiliary police.

== Formation of anti-German Soviet resistance ==
After the German invasion of Poland in 1939, which marked the beginning of World War II, the Soviet Union invaded the eastern regions of the Second Polish Republic (referred to as the Kresy) and annexed the lands totalling 201,015 square kilometres (77,612 sq mi) with a population of 13,299,000 inhabitants including ethnic Belarusians, Ukrainians, Poles, Jews, Czechs and others. Soviet era sources state that in 1939, Soviet forces took control of regions of the Polish Republic that had "a population of more than 12 million, including more than 6 million Ukrainians and about 3 million Belarusians."

The program of the partisan war was outlined in Moscow after the German attack in 1941 against the USSR. Directives issued on July 29, 1941 and in further documents by the Soviet People's Commissaries Council and Communist Party called for the formation of partisan detachments and 'diversionist' groups in the German-occupied territories. Joseph Stalin iterated his commands and directives to the people in his radio speech on 3 July 1941, and appointed himself Commander-in-Chief of the Red Army on 20 July 1941.

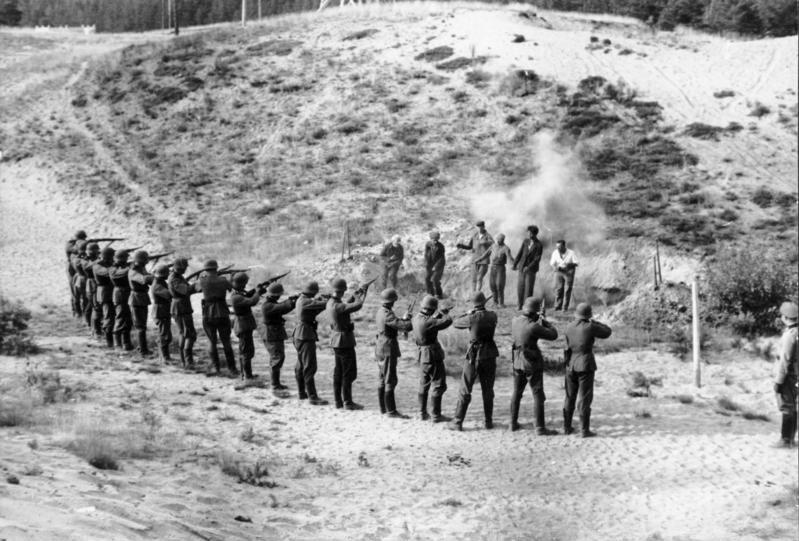
Execution of alleged partisans by German soldiers, September 1941

In 1941, the core of the partisan movement were the remains of the Red Army units destroyed in the first phase of Operation Barbarossa, personnel of destruction battalions, and the local Communist Party and Komsomol activists who chose to remain in Soviet-occupied prewar Poland. The most common unit of the period was a detachment. The first detachments commanded by Red Army officers and local Communist Party activists were formed in the first days of the war between Germany and the Soviet Union, including the Starasyel'ski detachment of Major Dorodnykh in the Zhabinka district (June 23, 1941) and the Pinsk detachment of Vasily Korzh on June 26, 1941. The first awards of the Hero of the Soviet Union order occurred on August 6, 1941 (detachment commanders Pavlovskiy and Bumazhkov). Some partisan detachments were parachuted into German-occupied territories in the summer of 1941. Urban underground groups were formed as a force complementing the activities of partisan units, operating in rural areas. The network of underground structures developed and received a steady influx of specially chosen party activists. By the end of 1941, more than 2,000 partisan detachments (with more than 90,000 personnel) operated in German-occupied territories.

However, the activity of partisan forces was not centrally coordinated and supplied until spring of 1942. In order to coordinate partisan operations the Central Headquarters of the Partisan Movement under Stavka, headed by Panteleimon Ponomarenko (Chief of Staff) and initially commanded by top Politburo member Kliment Voroshilov, was organized on 30 May 1942. The Staff had its liaison networks in the Military Councils of the Fronts and Armies. The territorial Staffs were subsequently created, dealing with the partisan movement in the respective Soviet Republics and in the occupied provinces of the Russian SFSR.

Some formations calling themselves Soviet partisans operated a long way outside Soviet territory – usually organized by former Soviet citizens who had escaped from Nazi camps. One such formation, Rodina (Motherland), acted in France. In 1944 Soviet partisans provided "proletarian internationalist" help to the people of German-occupied Central Europe, with seven united formations and 26 larger detachments operating in Poland, and 20 united formations and detachments operating in Czechoslovakia.

== Areas of operations ==
=== Belarus ===
By Soviet estimates, in August 1941 about 231 detachments were operating already. Units formed and inserted into Belarus totalled 437 by the end of the 1941, comprising more than 7,200 personnel. However, as the front line moved further away, conditions steadily worsened for the partisan units, as resources ran out, and there was no large-scale support from beyond the front until March 1942. One particular difficulty was the lack of radio communication, which was not addressed until April 1942. The partisan unit also lacked the support of local people. For several months, partisan units in Belarus were virtually left to their own devices; especially difficult was the winter of 1941–42, with severe shortages in ammunition, medicine and supplies. The actions of partisans were generally uncoordinated.

German pacification operations in the summer and autumn 1941 were able to curb the partisan activity significantly. Many units went underground, and generally, in late 1941 to early 1942, the partisan units were not undertaking significant military operations, but limiting themselves to sorting out organizational problems, building up support and establishing an influence over the local people. Although data is incomplete, at the end of 1941, 99 partisan detachments and about 100 partisan groups are known to have operated in Belarus. In winter 1941–42, 50 partisan detachments and about 50 underground organisations and groups operated in Belarus. During December 1941, German guard forces in the Army Group Center rear comprised 4 security divisions, 1 SS Infantry Brigade, 2 SS Infantry Brigade, and 260 companies from different branches of service.

By the end of 1943, partisans controlled more than 100,000 square kilometers of Belarus, which was about 60 percent of the republic's territory. The partisans controlled more than 20 regional centers and thousands of villages. By the time of the return of the Soviet Army, most of the Byelorussian SSR was in the hands of the partisan groups and the actual size of the republic controlled by the Germans was small.

==== Vitsyebsk gate and Western Belarus ====
The turning point in the development of the Soviet partisan movement came with the opening of the Vitsyebsk gate, a corridor connecting Soviet-controlled and German-occupied territories, in February 1942. Soviet strategists started taking the partisan units into account after that. The Red Army organized centralized administrative and logistical support, and the Gate proved an important factor in assisting partisan detachments in occupied territory with weapons. As a result, the partisans were able to effectively undermine German troops and significantly hamper their operations in the region from April 1942 until the end of the year. Some Jews and lower-rank Soviet activists felt more secure in the partisan ranks than in civilian life under Soviet rule.

In spring 1942, the concentration of smaller partisan units into brigades began, prompted by the experience of the first year of war. The coordination, numerical buildup, structural reworking and established supply lines all translated into greatly increased partisan capability, which showed in the increased instances of sabotage on the railroads, with hundreds of engines and thousands of cars destroyed by the end of the year.

In 1942, terror campaigns against the territorial administration staffed by local "collaborators and traitors" received extra emphasis. This resulted, however, in definite divisions within the local civilian population, resulting in the beginning of the organisation of anti-partisan units with native personnel in 1942. By November 1942, Soviet partisan units in Belarus numbered about 47,000 persons.

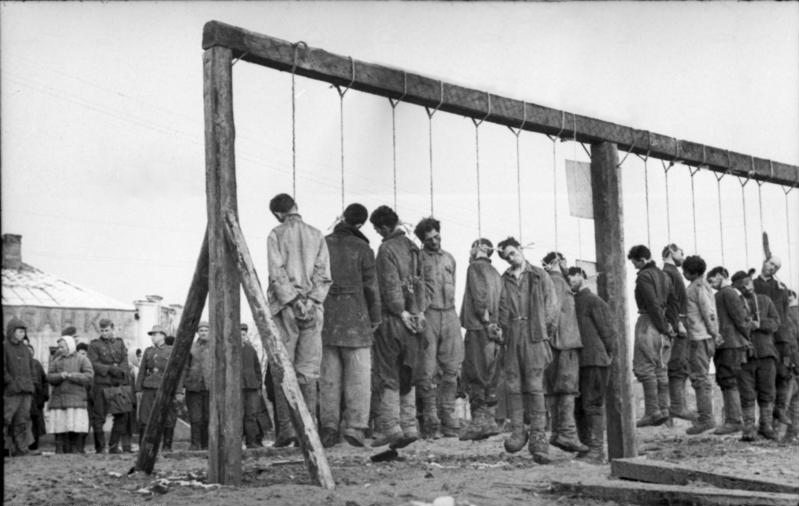
German photo showing alleged partisans hanged by the Germans in January 1943

In January 1943, out of 56,000 partisan personnel, 11,000 operated in western Belarus, 3.5 fewer per 10,000 local people than in the east, and even more so (up to a factor of 5 to 6) if one accounts for much more efficient Soviet evacuation measures in the east during 1941. Smallholders in the west showed "surprising" sympathies to the partisans.

There is strong evidence that the central Soviet authorities deliberately refrained from a larger accumulation of partisan forces in western Belarus and let Polish underground military structures grow in these lands during 1941–42 in order to strengthen Moscow's relations with the Polish government-in-exile of Władysław Sikorski. A certain level of military cooperation, imposed by the command headquarters, was noted between Soviet partisans and the Polish Home Army, Armia Krajowa (AK). Soviet partisans avoided to some extent attacking people of Polish nationality during the terror campaigns in 1942. After the breakdown of diplomatic relations between the USSR and the Polish government-in-exile in April 1943 resulting from the discovery of the Katyn massacre (which the Katyn Commission of April–May 1943 attributed to the Soviets), the situation changed radically. From this moment on, Moscow treated the AK as a hostile military force.

==== The 1943–1944 buildup ====
The buildup of the Soviet partisan force in western Belarus was ordered and implemented during 1943, with nine brigades, 10 detachments, and 15 operational groups transferred from east to west, effectively tripling the partisan force there (reaching 36,000 troops in December 1943). It is estimated that 10–12,000 personnel were transferred, and about the same number came from local volunteers. The buildup of the military force was complemented by the intensification of the underground Communist Party structures and propaganda activity.

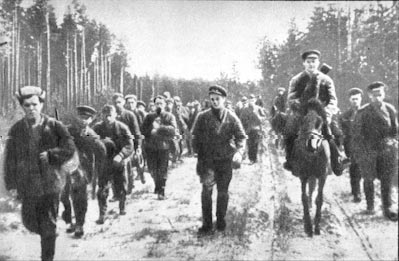
Soviet partisans on the road in Belarus, 1944 counter-offensive

The Soviet victory at Stalingrad, a certain lessening of the terror campaign (de facto from December 1942, formally permitted in February 1943) and an amnesty promised to collaborators who wished to return to the Soviet camp were significant factors in the 1943 growth of Soviet partisan forces. Desertions from the ranks of the German-controlled police and military formations strengthened units, with sometimes whole detachments coming over to the Soviet camp, including the Volga Tatar battalion (900 personnel, February 1943), and Vladimir Gil's 1st Russian People's Brigade of the SS (2,500 personnel, August 1943). In all, about 7,000 people of different anti-Soviet formations joined the Soviet partisan force, while about 1,900 specialists and commanders were dropped into occupied Belarus in 1943. However, local people mainly accounted for most increases in the Soviet partisan force.

=== Ukraine ===
The first year of the war was devastating for the Soviet partisans of Ukraine. Nevertheless, between August 1941 and the beginning of March 1942, 30,000 partisans had been organised into more than 1,800 detachments; by the beginning of May 1942, there were just 37 detachments, consisting of 1,918 individuals, that were operational and communicating with the Soviet Union.

In 1942–1943, the Putivl partisan detachment led by Sydir Kovpak carried out a raid from the Briansk forests to eastern Ukraine through Pinsk, Volyn, Rovno, Zhitomir, and Kiev Oblasts. In 1943, they carried out operations in the Carpathians. Kovpak's Sumy partisan unit covered a distance of more than 10,000 kilometers in fighting at the rear of German troops and destroyed garrisons in 39 populated areas. Kovpak's operations played an important role in the development of the partisan movement against German occupying forces. This precipitous growth in the strength and activity level of partisan units prompted members of the German General Staff to suggest that Hitler consider the use of poison gas as a possible remedy to deal with the growing partisan menace.

Partisans in regions of Ukraine assisted the Soviet Army in battles in Kiev, where the first partisan regiment under the command of E. K. Chekhov was formed by forces from the NKVD, the local Communist Party and Komsomol. Partisans in Dnipropetrovsk province provided significant assistance to troops on the southern and southwestern fronts, who helped restrain the German offensive in the Donbass in October–November 1941. Partisan detachments operating in the Novomoskovsk region under the command of P. Zuchenko raided a prisoner of war camp where Soviets were held, and having defeated the guards of the camp, released 300 prisoners.

The partisan struggle was noteworthy in Odessa province, with partisan forces led by V. Molodtsov-Badaev. Occupation forces testified that "During the two years of occupation, carried out mainly by Romanians, the city turned into a fortress of the partisan movement. Withdrawing from Odessa in the autumn of 1941, the Russians created a reliable partisan core in the city. The partisans settled in catacombs, the extensive network of which at 100 kilometers had no equal in Europe. It was a real underground fortress with staffs, shelters, logistical facilities of all kinds, right up to its own bakery and printing house, in which leaflets were printed."

According to historian Alexander Gogun, the partisans overstated their effectiveness in their reports. These inflated figures were passed back up the chain of command to Stalin, even finding their way into Soviet history books. Gogun says that the primary partisan targets in 1941–1942 were not the German invaders but rather the local police, who were under German direction, and civilian collaborators. Gogun argues that the years 1943–44 were the peak of partisan activity within the territory of present-day Ukraine, as the Soviets battled the far-right, nationalistic OUN and the UPA, both of whom collaborated with the Nazis. Attempts to persuade villages supporting the OUN and UPA to cease combat against Soviet partisans led to further conflicts between them. According to Gogun, reprisal measures for attacks on Soviet partisans or support for Ukrainian nationalists included burning down villages and executions. Gogun exclusively cites German, OUN, and UPA sources when stating that whole families were killed, and children, even babies, were sometimes bayoneted or burned alive.

=== Russia ===
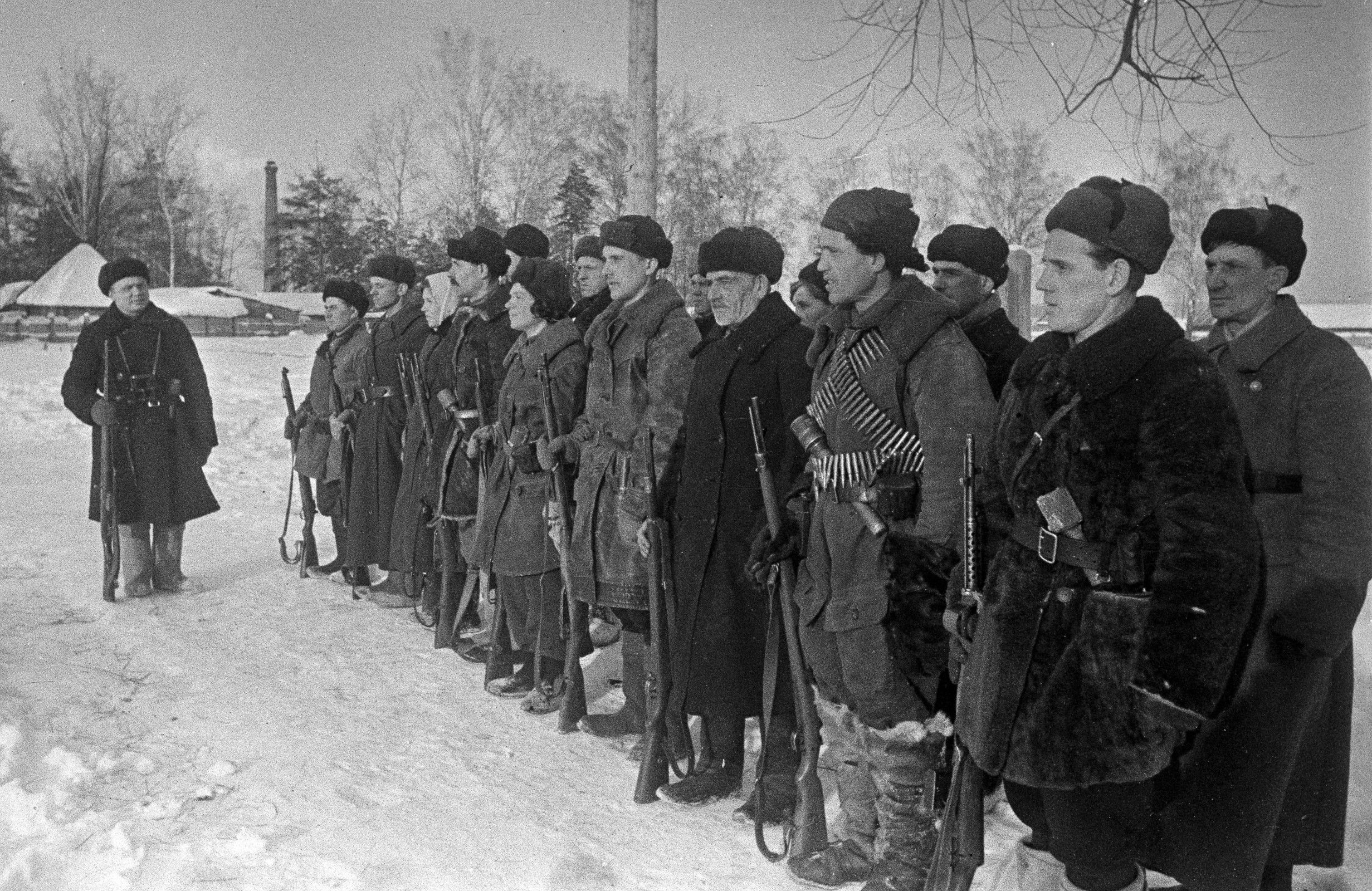
Soviet partisans in Solnechnogorsky District (Moscow Oblast), November 1941

In the Bryansk region, Soviet partisans controlled large areas behind the German lines. In the summer of 1942, they effectively held more than 14,000 km^{2} (5,400 sq mi) with a population of over 200,000 people. Soviet partisans in the region were led by Oleksiy Fedorov, Alexander Saburov, and others and numbered over 60,000 men. The Belgorod, Oryol, Kursk, Novgorod, Leningrad, Pskov, and Smolensk regions also had significant partisan activity during the occupation period. In the Oryol and Smolensk regions, partisans were led by Dmitry Medvedev.

Territories liberated or under partisan authority were important during the war. There were major partisan areas and zones in Leningrad, Kalinin, Smolensk, and Orel Oblasts. In Kalinin Oblast, for example, the partisans held 7,000 km^{2} (2,700 sq mi). Partisan zones and areas made it difficult for the German-led occupation forces to carry out re-groupings and pinned down a considerable portion of their forces. During offensives by Soviet troops, German-led forces were often unable to organize strong defenses in the partisan zones. As a result, the German forces were forced to group forces only along the roads. Partisan areas were frequently used by regular Soviet troops to reach the flanks and rear of German groupings rapidly, to drop (land) airborne forces, and to disrupt organized enemy withdrawal.

The partisan and underground struggle in the German-occupied territories influenced the reduction of morale and combat effectiveness of the German-led armed forces and contributed to Soviet Army victories. There was a collapse of German military and political leadership in the occupied Soviet territories that deprived German forces of raw materials, food, and labor. The political work of the partisans and underground forces was a powerful force in the struggle against occupation. According to the commander of garrisons belonging to German Army Group Center, the partisan movement was combined with "efficient and skillful propaganda, which calls on people of the occupied areas to fight against invaders." This led to more reluctance to collaborate with German occupation forces.

According to the memoirs of Marshal Georgy Zhukov, the partisan fighters operating in Smolensk and Orel districts contributed significantly to Soviet Army victories in the summer of 1943 in Kursk and Orel. Further, as in the case of the earlier Soviet victories at Moscow and Stalingrad, the Kursk victory too stimulated strong new growth of the partisan movement overall.

Because of the aggressive partisan attacks on rail communications, German Army Group North was forced to use truck transport to move reinforcements to the crucial sectors of the front where combat raged. German occupation leader Ziemke discussed the intensity of partisan fighting in northwestern Russia, stating: "Meanwhile, the partisans had so thoroughly disrupted the railroads that the other two reserve divisions had to be routed to Pskov, 130 miles north of Nevel, and there loaded in trucks, not enough of which were available. On 9 October, Kuchler decided to wait until the reinforcements were assembled before trying again to close the gap."

According to German estimates, in August 1941, 10 percent of the Nazi rear area was full of Soviet partisans. By October 1942, this figure had risen to 75 percent, and by the autumn of the same year, fully 10 per cent of all German field divisions in Russia were engaged in fighting with partisans.

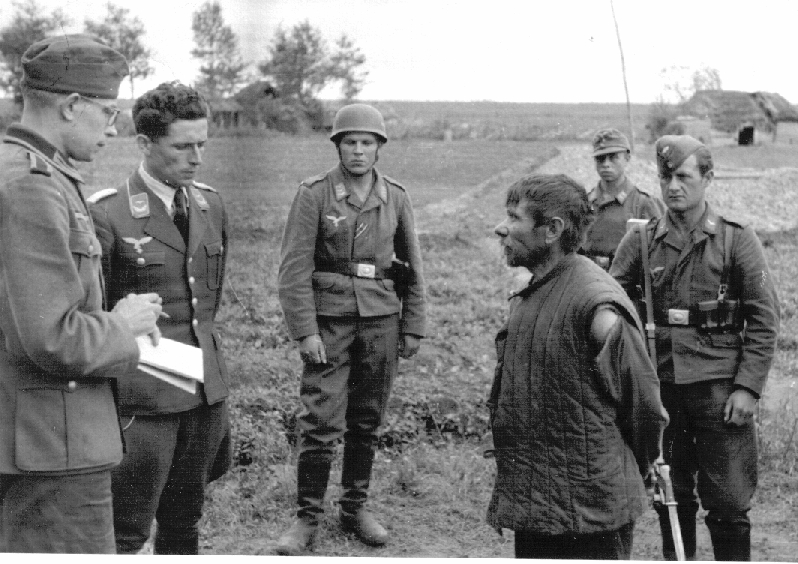
German propaganda photo: interrogation of a Soviet partisan by Wehrmacht Luftwaffe Fallschirmjäger paratroopers, Russia 1942

In 1943, after the Red Army started to liberate western Russia and northeastern Ukraine, many partisans, including units led by Fedorov, Medvedev, and Saburov, were ordered to re-locate their operations into central and western Ukraine still occupied by Nazis. Partisans of the Leningrad and Kalinin (Pskov and Novgorod) regions operated against German forces for as many as three years before liberation by the Red Army.

There was a large scale sign up by women to participate. S. V. Grishin led in Smolensk the partisan brigade "Thirteen" which had an all female reconnaissance including Evdokiya Karpechkina. Due to lack of respect by men towards women, a rejection was made by Nina when a platoon made out of men was proposed to be put under the leadership of Nina Zevrova in Leningrad.

=== Estonia, Latvia, and Lithuania ===
While Soviet sources claim that thousands of partisans were operating in the Baltic region, they only operated in the Latgale region of Latvia and the Vilnius district. Thus, Estonia remained partisan free throughout most of the war. By 1944, only 234 partisans were fighting in Estonia and none were native volunteers, all being either NKVD or Red Army personnel parachuted in from the Soviet-controlled territories. A very small pro-Soviet underground, however, did exist. In Latvia, the partisans were first under Russian and Belarusian command, and from January 1943, directly subordinated to the central Headquarters in Moscow, under the leadership of Arturs Sproģis.

Partisan groups in Latvia, Lithuania, and Estonia made a significant contribution to the Soviet victory. According to Alexander Chapenko, history professor at Murmansk State University, Latvia had the most number of partisan formations. There were large partisan units led by Vilis Samsons, which carried out large military activities. In Lithuania, there were two underground forces – these are quite large subdivisions – and by mid-1944, about 220 underground communist organizations were operating. By the end of the war, there were 2 partisan brigades and 11 detachments. Two brigades took part in the liberation of Vilnius and provided assistance to Soviet troops.

In 1941, the Soviet partisan movement in Lithuania began with the actions of a small number of Red Army soldiers left behind enemy lines, much like the beginning of partisan movements in Ukraine and Belarus. The movement grew throughout 1942, and in the summer of that year, the Lithuanian Soviet partisan movement began receiving material aid as well as specialists and instructors in guerrilla warfare from Soviet-held territory. On 26 November 1942, the Command of the Lithuanian Partisan Movement (Lietuvos partizaninio judėjimo štabas) was created in Moscow, headed by the First Secretary of the Lithuanian Communist Party Antanas Sniečkus, who fled to Moscow in the wake of the German invasion in 1941. Although the Soviet partisans in Lithuania were nominally under the control of the Command of the Lithuanian Partisan Movement, the guerrilla warfare specialists and instructors sent by it reported directly to the Central Command of the Partisan Movement. Modern Lithuanian historians estimate that about half of the Soviet partisans in Lithuania were escapees from POW and concentration camps, Soviet activists and Red Army soldiers left behind the quickly advancing front line, while the other half was made up of airdropped special operations experts. It is estimated that in total, about 5,000 people engaged in pro-Soviet underground activities in Lithuania during the war. In general, the role of Soviet dissident groups in Lithuania in Second World War was minimal.

=== Finland and Karelia ===
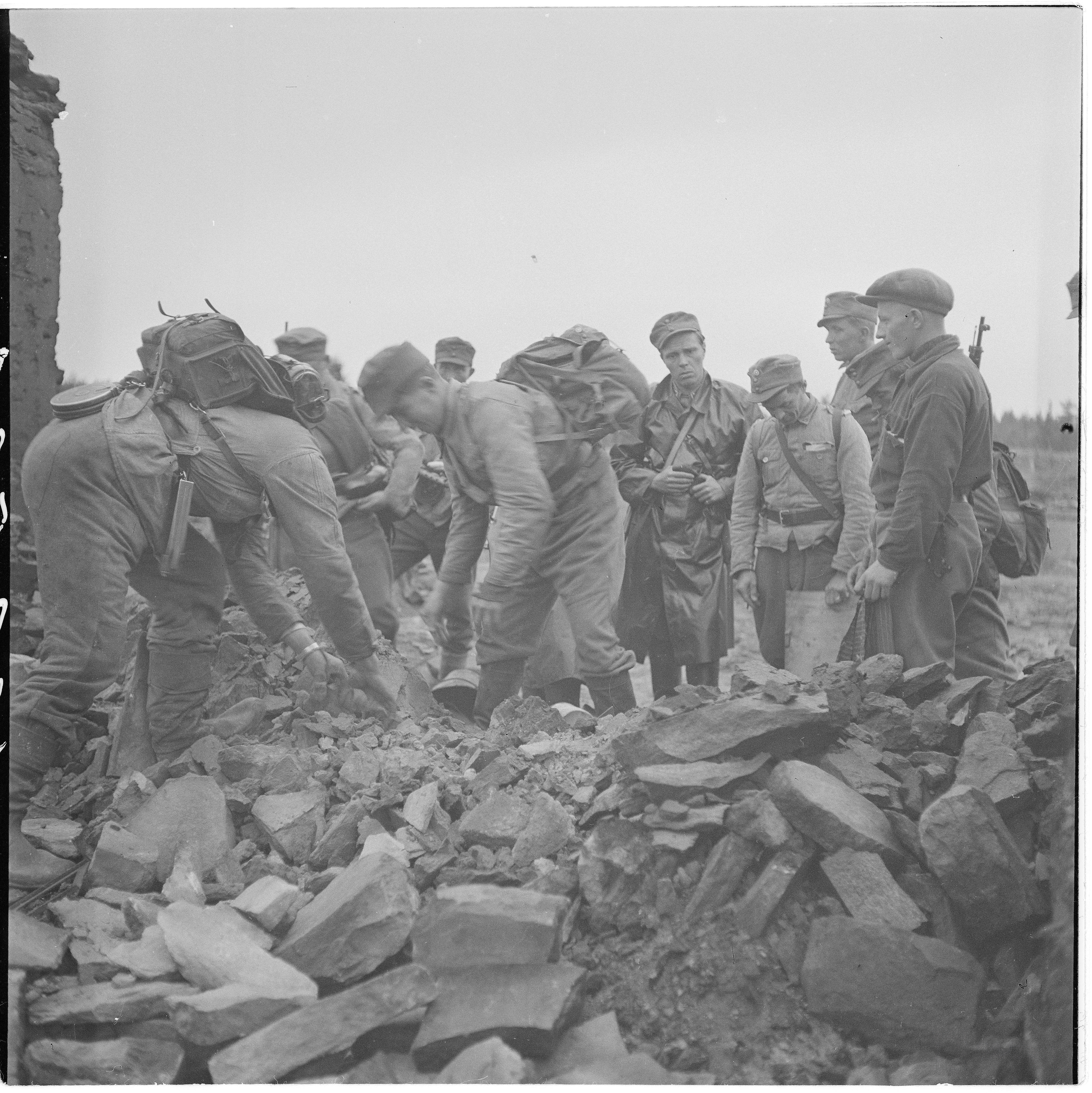
Village of Viianki after the Soviet partisan raid, July 7, 1943.

During the Finnish occupation of Eastern Karelia, many ethnic Russians and some Karelians supported the partisan attacks. Approximately 5,000 partisans altogether fought in the region, although the typical strength of the force was 1,500–2,300. Peculiarities of this front were that partisan units were not created inside occupied territory. Their personnel came from all over the Soviet Union and that they mainly operated from the Soviet side of the front line.

Partisans distributed propaganda newspapers, Pravda in the Finnish language and "Lenin's Banner" in the Russian language. One of the more notable leaders of the partisan movement in Finland and Karelia was the future leader of the USSR, Yuri Andropov.

In East Karelia, most partisans attacked Finnish military supply and communication targets, but inside Finland proper, and Finnish sources claim that almost two-thirds of the attacks targeted civilians, killing 200 and injuring 50, mostly women, children, and elderly. Finnish sources claim that on one occasion in the small village the partisans murdered all civilians, leaving no witnesses to the atrocities. According to Russian historians, Finnish historians, and especially the mass media have politicized the issue of relations between Soviet partisans and Finnish civilians. In particular, Finnish historians characterize actions of a sabotage group against a group of Finnish border guards in the village of Kuoska in eastern Lapland as an attack on civilians.

Russian views however differ, as according to Sergey Verigin, Director of the Institute of History in Petrozavodsk University, the allegation that partisans killed civilians in Finland is "an absolutely unreasonable point of view. It is contrary to international law and all documents and treaties concluded after the Second World War. The hype began during perestroika. There were publications about the death of peaceful Finnish civilians at the hands of partisans. The topic has been politicized. On Finnish territory, partisans entered villages searching for food. They had no goal of specifically destroying civilians. But it's clear that there were some conflicts. And the population of the border areas had weapons i.e. it had ceased to be peaceful."

Partisan operations against Finns were estimated as being highly ineffectual. The partisans did not have sufficient strength to attack military targets, and would often falsely report their raids to higher command, claiming attacks on German or Finnish military targets even if the victims were civilians. Already in the autumn of 1941, the report of Komissariat of Interior Affairs was highly critical, and it became only worse, as stated in the counter-intelligence agency's report of April 1944. The main explanations given for the operations' failures were the isolated headquarters at Belomorsk, which did not know what operative units were doing, personnel who had no local knowledge and were partly made up of criminals (10–20% of all personnel were conscripted from prisons) without knowledge of how to operate in harsh terrain and climate, efficient Finnish counter-partisan patrolling (more than two-thirds of the infiltrating small partisan groups were completely destroyed) and Finnish internment of the ethnic Russian civilian population in concentration camps from those regions with active partisan operations. Internees were released to secure areas, preventing partisans from receiving local supplies. In addition, many Soviet Karelians reported to the Finns the movements of the partisans and did not support the Soviet Partisans.

=== Moldova ===
Between 1941 and 1944 forty groups were active behind the Axis front line in the Moldavian Soviet Socialist Republic, acting against the Romanian troops which took over the territory following the Nazi invasion of the Soviet Union. The partisan detachments distributed propaganda and attacked local industrial and military facilities, neutralizing around 14,000 enemy soldiers and officers and capturing extensive military equipment. With a maximum strength of 3,900, its losses amounted to 600 captured and up to 850 executed.

=== Soviet-occupied Poland ===
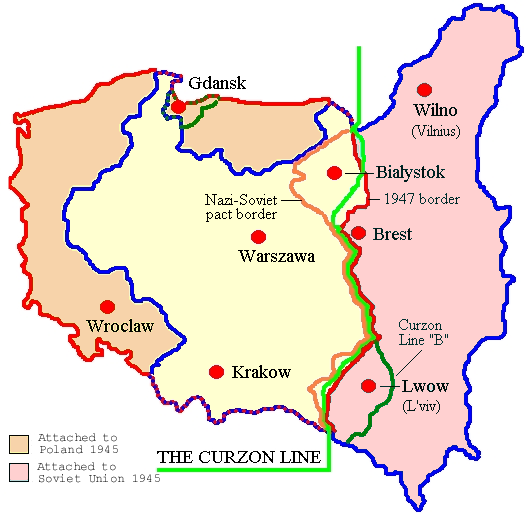
1939–1945 border changes. The orange line depicts the extent of areas occupied by Soviet Union in 1939–1941 per the secret protocol of the Molotov–Ribbentrop Pact

In the former eastern territories of the Second Polish Republic, attached to the Ukrainian and Belarusian Soviet Republics after the Soviet invasion of Poland, the organization and operation of Soviet partisans were similar to that in Ukrainian and Belarusian territories. However, there were notable differences in the interaction of partisans with Polish national forces and the local population. There were also Soviet-affiliated and controlled groups, namely Gwardia Ludowa, later transformed into Armia Ludowa, which while often described as parts of the Polish resistance, were de facto controlled by Soviets, and as such can also be seen as extensions of the Soviet partisans.

After an initial period of wary collaboration with the independent Polish resistance, the conflicts between Soviet-affiliated and independent groups intensified, especially as Poles were principally the victims of Soviet terror between 1939 and 1941, and Soviet diplomatic relations with the Polish exile government in London continued to worsen and were broken off completely by Soviet government in the aftermath of the discovery of the Katyn massacre in 1943. As a result, Soviet partisans started extensive operations against both the Polish underground and the civilian population of the areas seized by the Soviets in 1939. The campaign of terror resulted in reports to London of horrifying looting, rape and murder. This made many local AK commanders consider the Soviets as just another enemy and eventually on 22 June 1943, Soviets partisans were ordered by Moscow to take on the Polish units as well. In addition to engaging German military and police targets, according to Bogdan Musial Soviet partisans also targeted the poorly armed and trained Belarusian and Polish self-defense units (some of these units were formed with Nazi encouragement and were viewed as collaborationist). Additionally, Soviet partisans were instructed to opportunistically use the Nazis against Polish non-communist resistance by feeding the German forces information on Poles. The Soviet partisans were involved in several massacres of Polish civilians, including at Naliboki on 8 May 1943 and at Koniuchy on 29 January 1944. Soviet partisans and Red Army Officers have also murdered members of Polish anti-Nazi resistance after inviting them to "negotiations" in 1943, and also denounced them to the Germans, who then killed the Poles.

Soviet partisans attacked Polish partisans, villages, and small towns in order to weaken the Polish structures in the areas which Soviet Union claimed for itself. Frequent requisitions of food in local villages and brutal reprisal actions against villages considered disloyal to the Soviet Union sparked the creation of numerous self-defence units, often joining the ranks of the Armia Krajowa. Similar assaults on the Polish resistance organizations also took place in Ukraine. Communist propaganda called the Polish resistance the "bands of White Poles", or "the protégés of the Gestapo." On 23 June 1943, the Soviet leaders ordered the partisans to denounce Polish partisan to the Nazis. The Soviet units were authorized to "shoot the [Polish] leaders" and "discredit, disarm, and dissolve" their units. Under pretences of cooperation, two sizable Polish partisan units were led to their destruction (a common strategy involved inviting the Polish commanders to negotiations, arresting or murdering them and attacking the Polish partisans by surprise).

== Relations with local population ==
To survive, resistance fighters largely relied on the civilian population. This included access to food, clothing and other supplies. Soviet partisans requisitioned food, livestock and clothes from local peasants, and when peasants did not share them willingly, they often did it by force. The results of such requisitioning were made more severe by the fact that Axis occupation forces had been already carrying out their own requisitions. This led to conflicts between Soviet partisans and local populace in areas less friendly to the Soviet Union, mostly in territories of Poland annexed by the Soviet Union in 1939 and the Baltic states annexed in 1940.

Partisans are accused of provoking brutal countermeasures from the Nazi occupiers that targeted civilians. Trying to limit partisan activities, German command employed mass killings of hostages among the residents of areas supporting partisan forces. In the case of partisan attack or sabotage, a number of locals would be executed. Such hostage operations happened in the form of preliminary arrests, post-attack retaliation actions, and/or compulsory "watch-groups" deployed on vulnerable sites and killed if they did not avert the attack. In Belarus alone, according to historian Christian Gerlach, German anti-partisan actions killed an estimated 345,000 people, mostly civilians.

=== In annexed territories ===
Numerous accounts of Soviet partisan operations in former Polish territories discuss their strained relations with local peasants. Polish peasants often refused to voluntarily support the Soviet partisans, which in turn lead to the Soviets forcefully acquiring supplies.

Chodakiewicz reported that a high ranking Soviet commander said, "Most partisan units feed, clothe, and arm themselves at the expense of the local population and not by capturing booty in the struggle against fascism. That arouses in the people a feeling of hostility, and they say, 'The Germans take everything away and one must also give something to the partisans'."

Among the targets of Soviet partisans were not only Axis military and their collaboration units, but also civilians accused of being collaborators or sometimes even those who were considered not to support the partisans strongly enough. In some cases, Germans allowed peasants to form self-defense units against Soviet raids, which in extreme cases led to violent clashes between the Soviet partisans and local peasants, resulting in civilian casualties, as was the case with the Koniuchy and Naliboki massacres in Polish-Lithuanian borderland in 1943–1944.

=== In Soviet Union territories ===
In territories that were a part of the Soviet Union before the war, their relations with the locals were much better. There, Soviet partisans often had the support of civilians and the unity of partisans and the local population had a positive effect on partisan activities. Elderly men and women and children often put themselves in mortal danger. A number of Soviet sources extol the level of cooperation between the partisans and the populace, for example, a leader of the Minsk underground Communist Party committee reported: "The local people helped us in the search for weapons. From rivers, swamps, and forests, people located rifles, ammunition, shells, and all this was delivered to us." The local population provided food and clothing to partisans voluntarily. Local civilians organized into self-defense detachments, delivered food, collected weapons from past battles, and prepared lodging for partisans. Residents cared for sick and wounded fighters. Self-defense groups assisted partisans to secure areas and conduct reconnaissance. Communist Party leadership in partisan organizations was significant and had a positive influence. Commissars were responsible for ensuring discipline and supervised all partisan activities to ensure they followed guiding principles of the partisan movement. Political commissars insisted that partisan fighters enhance their ideological and political awareness and maintain close and friendly relations with the local population. In territories freed by the partisans, the partisans accumulated and trained reserves, provided care to the sick and wounded, built airfields to receive planes from the rest of the Soviet Union. Large numbers of Soviet citizens fleeing destruction from German-occupied areas were provided relief by partisans.

In Belarus, workers and employees of Minsk, Brest, Grodno, Borisov, and other cities that were occupied by Germany transferred weapons to partisan detachments that were sometimes stationed far away from large settlements. Weapons were bought, exchanged, or taken directly from garrisons, warehouses and then taken secretly to the woods. In 1942 and in the first half of 1943, residents of the Ushachsky district in Vitebsk region handed over 260 tons of bread to partisans. On the eve of the Soviet offensive into Belarus, partisan intelligence reported on German plans to deport a portion of the population to Ostrovets and to shoot the rest of the citizens. On 3 July 1944, the partisans seized the town and held it for several days until they were relieved by advancing Soviet forces. Belorussian partisans alone managed to rescue 15,000 Soviet citizens from German hands and moved another 80,000 inhabitants from German-occupied territory to the Soviet rear.

According to Alexander Statiev,"Despite the ruthless procurement policy sanctioned at the top level and numerous abuses by commanders that aggravated this policy, most requisitions in these regions still had a benign outcome: civilians perceived the loss of some of their assets to partisans as a fair price for the temporary absence of Germans and the eventual victory. However, most people in the borderlands, incorporated by the Soviet Union in 1939–1940, resented the Soviet regime and its representatives, the partisans."

At the same time, when pressed for supplies, partisans also engaged in significant amount of plunder:

[Soviet partisan] commanders frequently overstepped the blurred line between requisition and robbery. Balitskii described how the partisans from the unit commanded by Yakov Mel'nik 'ransacked Rudnitsa village like jackals and robbed almost all peasants' (Bazhan 2010, p. 452). Other units confiscated the entire potato crop in several villages having threatened their residents with execution (Bazhan 2010, p. 418); they beat peasants up with rifle rods to force them to surrender harnesses and clothes and smashed the stoves in peasant homes to extract steel chimneys (Bazhan 2010, pp. 424, 427). Balitskii called these gangs 'bastards...alienating peasants from the real partisans engaged in fight against the fascists' (Bazhan2010, p. 424). Ivan Syromolotnyi, inspector of the Central Committee of the Ukrainian Communist Party, reported that partisans from the formation commanded by Aleksandr Saburov 'resemble bandits. People flee from his unit to the forests as they flee from the Germans. Plunder is unlimited' (Gogun & Kentii 2006, p. 143). According to Dmitrii Medvedev, commander of Pobediteli unit, Saburov's partisans became so accustomed to plunder that their commanders could not restrain them any longer. When he demanded that Ivan Shitov, commander of one of Saburov's units, stop 'the banditry and robberies', 'the former commissar of Shitov's battalion asked me: "Do you want our partisans to kill us in the first action?"' (Gogun & Kentii 2006, p. 180). All these sweeping requisitions and plain plunder, sanctioned by field commanders, took place in villages considered generally loyal.

Particularly in Crimea, the Soviet partisans' relations with the local populace of Crimean Tatars was very bad. Having failed to properly provision the troops before the area was overrun by the Germans, partisans launched "in the words of the Crimean Provincial Party Committee, 'violent confiscations of food in Tatar villages without distinguishing friends from foes'". This resulted in violent conflict between mostly Slavic partisans and local Tatars, encouraged by the Germans who allowed Tatar villages to raise self-defence militia. Being unable to obtain supplies, the Soviet partisans suffered major casualties, and the partisan resistance in the Crimea nearly vanished by the summer of 1942.

== List of operations ==
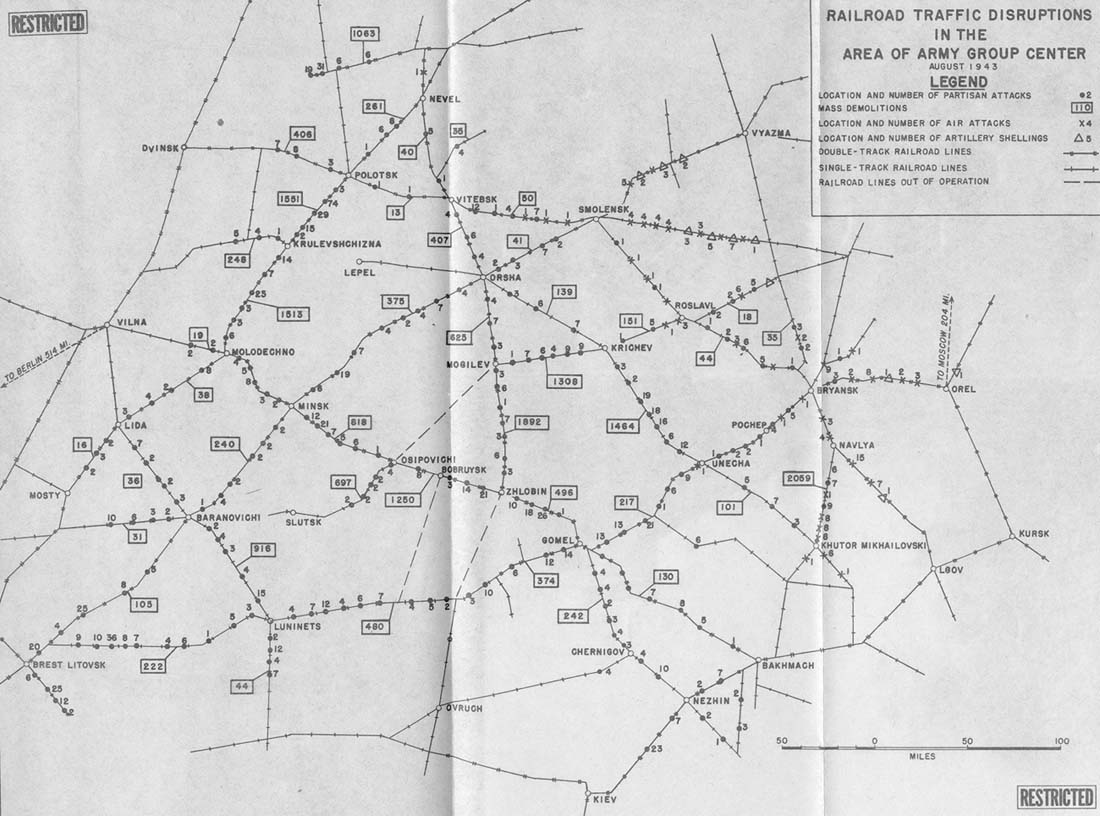
A map showing railroad traffic disruptions in the area of Army Group Center, August 1943.

- Vasily Korzh raid, Autumn 1941 – 23 March 1942. 1,000 km (620 mi) raid of a partisan formation in the Minsk and Pinsk Oblasts of Belarus.
- Battles of Spadshchansky Forest, 19 October – November 1941. Partisan battles against the Nazi punitive expeditions, with over 3,000 German troops and police against 73 Sumy partisans in November.
- Battle of Bryansk Forests, May 1942. Partisan battle against the Nazi punitive expedition that included five infantry divisions, military police, 120 tanks, and aviation.
- Raid of Sydir Kovpak, 26 October – 29 November 1942. Raid in the Bryansk Forests and eastern Ukraine.
- Battle of Bryansk forests, May – June 1943. Partisan battle in the Bryansk Forests with German punitive expeditions.
- Operation Rails War, 3 August – 15 September 1943. A major operation of partisan formations against the railroad communications intended to disrupt the German reinforcements and supplies for the Battle of Kursk and later the Battle of Smolensk. It involved concentrated actions by more than 100,000 partisan fighters from Belarus, the Leningrad Oblast, the Kalinin Oblast, the Smolensk Oblast, the Oryol Oblast, and Ukraine within an area 1,000 km (620 mi) along the front and 750 km (470 mi) wide. Reportedly, more than 230,000 rails were destroyed, along with many bridges, trains and other railroad infrastructure. The operation seriously incapacitated German logistics and was instrumental in the Soviet victory at Kursk.
- Operation Concert, 19 September – 1 November 1943. "Concerto" was a major operation of partisan formations against the railroad communications intended to disrupt the German reinforcements and supplies for the Battle of the Dnieper and on the direction of the Soviet offensive in the Smolensk and Gomel directions. Partisans from Belarus, Karelia, the Kalinin Oblast, Lithuania, Latvia, Estonia, and Crimea participated in the operations. The area of the operation was 900 km (560 mi) along the front (excluding Karelia and Crimea) and 400 km (250 mi) wide. Despite bad weather that only permitted the airlift of less than 50% of the planned supplies, the operation lead to a 35–40% decrease in the railroad capacity in the area of operations. This was critical for the success of Soviet military operations in the autumn of 1943. In Belarus alone, the partisans claimed the destruction of more than 90,000 rails along with 1,061 trains, 72 railroad bridges, and 58 Axis garrisons. According to the Soviet historiography, Axis losses totalled more than 53,000 soldiers.
- Battle of Polotsk-Leppel, April 1944. Major battle between Belarusian partisans and German punitive expeditions.
- Battle of Borisovsk-Begoml, 22 April – 15 May 1944. Major battle between Belarusian partisans and German punitive expeditions.
- Operation Bagration, 22 June – 19 August 1944. Belarusian partisans took major part in Operation Bagration. They were often considered the fifth front (along with the 1st Baltic Front, 1st Belorussian Front, 2nd Belorussian Front, and 3rd Belorussian Front). Upwards of 300,000 partisans took part in the operation.

== Intelligence activity ==
From the very beginning of its existence, the partisan intelligence had been aimed chiefly at serving the Red Army operational purposes. It had frequently been asked to provide detailed information on enemy's whereabouts, strengths, armaments, movements and intentions. Yet, the partisans' ability to meet the expectations of military consumers was limited. In 1941–1942, they relied chiefly on field intelligence – foot patrols, observation, and questioning of local population – and only from late 1942 onwards succeeded in developing human intelligence capabilities. Unfortunately, the majority of their agents and collaborators were illiterate farmers and laborers unprepared for intelligence work. Technological means of collection such as communications interceptors and night vision devices were used by the partisans only on rare occasions. Besides, the wide scale deployment and high efficiency of the German security services limited the partisans' gathering capabilities in the military field to the rural areas, almost completely preventing their access to the Wehrmacht's bases and decision making centers.

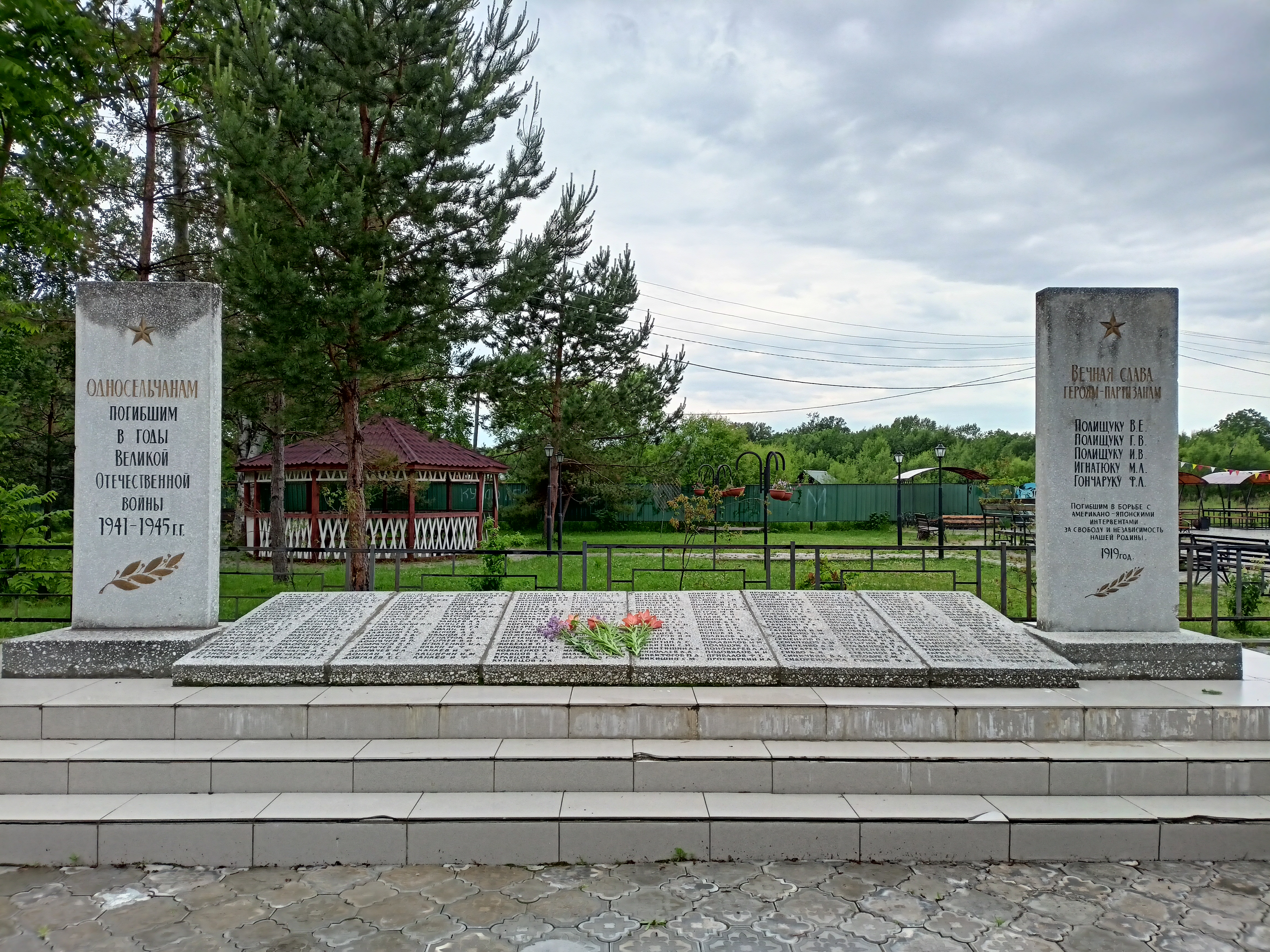
Memorial to Soviet partisans in Khabarovsk Krai, Russia

Partisan intelligence's contribution to the political leadership of the Soviet Union and its intelligence community appears to have been more significant, especially in collecting information on conditions in the occupied territories, as well as on the structure of the occupation administration, its everyday behavior, local collaborators and sympathizers. This contribution allowed the Soviet regime to maintain its authority and control behind the German lines and reinforced its anti-Nazi propaganda effort in the occupied territories and in the west. The Soviet intelligence and security services used the information obtained by the partisans for improving their operational capabilities in the German-controlled territories and preparing the measures for reoccupation of eastern Poland and the Baltic states.

== Psychological warfare ==
The partisan propaganda means had developed over the occupation period. In its early stage, the partisan messages were mainly short and unsophisticated and used simple spreading channels, such as verbal communication and leaflets. Consequently, some of the big-sized and mighty partisan detachments succeeded in establishing their own print houses that published periodic ‘partisan newspapers’ based on the propaganda broadcasts from Moscow and local reality.

The effect of the partisan psychological warfare is hard to evaluate. Nevertheless, it appears that at least a part of the defections from the Wehrmacht and other Axis troops, that occurred on the Eastern front in 1942–1944, might be attributed to the partisan propaganda effort, as well as the relatively high number of the local volunteers to the Soviet guerrilla detachments starting from the summer of 1943. Furthermore, in many occupied areas the very presence of anti-German irregulars emphasized the continued presence of ‘Kremlin's watchful eye’, unnerved occupying forces and their collaborators and thus undermined the enemy's attempt to ‘pacify’ the local populace.

== Foreign nationalities serving with the partisans and Soviet partisans abroad ==
A significant number of Soviet citizens were outside Soviet borders during the war and many took part in numerous partisan formations and saboteur groups in France, Poland, Yugoslavia, Bulgaria, Belgium, Czechoslovakia, and other countries. More than 40,000 Soviet citizens joined partisan formations in these countries. For example, about 25,000 Soviet partisans fought in Poland and Czechoslovakia. Some of these perished in the resistance and have become national heroes in the countries they fought in, including M. Huseynzade in Yugoslavia, F. Poletaev in Italy, and V. Porik in France. More than 12,000 Soviet partisans operated in Poland alone, the most notable of which were P. Vershigora's 1st Ukrainian Partisan division and other partisan brigades and units commanded by I. Banov, V. Karasev, G. Kovalev, S. Sankov, and several others. Many of these partisans, together with 600,000 Red Army soldiers, died on Polish soil.

== Ethnic minorities serving with the partisans ==
=== Jews and partisans ===
Able-bodied male Jews were usually welcomed by the partisans (sometimes only if they brought their own weapons). More than 10% of the Soviet partisan movement were Jews. However, Jewish women, children, and the elderly were usually not welcome. Often, however, separate Jewish groups, both guerrilla units and mixed family groups of refugees (like the Bielski partisans), were subordinated to the communist partisan leadership and considered as Soviet allies.

=== Soviet Ukrainian partisans ===
The Soviet Ukrainian partisans achieved some success only in Slovakia, a nominally independent country under German tutelage. The Slovak countryside and mountains became a ‘hotbed’ for the Soviet guerrillas in the second half of 1944. Dozens of the partisan detachments that came from Soviet Ukraine and formerly Soviet-occupied Poland conducted sabotage acts against German communication lines, harassed the local German community and finally took an active part in the Slovak National Uprising launched by the Slovak resistance movement on 29 August 1944. The insurgents established their headquarters in the central-Slovak town Banská Bystrica, conducted contacts with the Allied powers, managed to hold out for two months against the German and the Slovak collaborationist troops, and even dispatched sabotage and intelligence units to Hungary and Moravia.

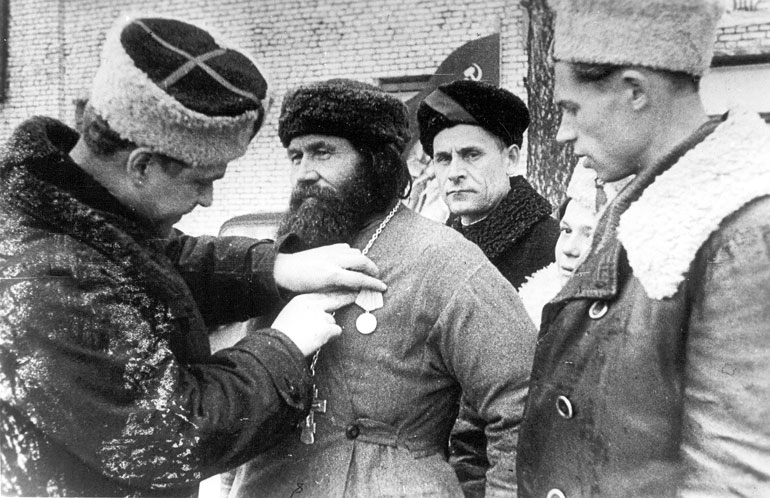
A village priest being awarded the Medal "To a Partisan of the Patriotic War" 2nd class in Ukraine

However, due to the Red Army's inability or possibly unwillingness to support the rebels, many of whom were loyal to the London-based Czechoslovak government-in-exile, the Slovak National Uprising was brutally suppressed in late October 1944. The attempt of the Soviet Ukrainian partisans to continue the guerrilla war in the Carpathian Mountains during the winter of 1944–1945 had little effect on the Germans but led to severe losses among the partisans. Most returned to the Soviet-controlled territory without being able to assist the Red Army war effort. Nonetheless, the remnants of the Soviet Ukrainian partisan networks remained active in Slovakia and Moravia, mostly in the intelligence field, until early May.

== Operations against independence movements ==
In addition to fighting the Nazis, Soviet partisans fought against organizations that sought to establish independent non-communist states of Poland, Lithuania, Latvia, Estonia, Belarus, and Ukraine. Most of the resistance groups in the Baltic States and Poland sought to re-establish independent states free of Soviet domination.

Soviet partisans are therefore a controversial issue in those countries. In Latvia, former Soviet partisan Vasiliy Kononov was prosecuted and convicted for war crimes against locals. The conviction was ultimately upheld by European Court of Human Rights.

=== Relations with Polish partisans ===
In the early years of the war, following German invasion of the Soviet Union, many Polish and Soviet partisans saw Germans as the common enemy, and hostility between the two groups was limited. However, by mid-1943, as the Soviets gained the upper hand and started to push German forces westwards, and following the breakdown of diplomatic relationship between Polish government in exile and the Soviet Union in the aftermath of the revelations about the Katyn massacre on 22 June 1943, Soviet partisans received orders to engage non-communist Polish partisans of Armia Krajowa, and the hostilities between the two groups escalated. On numerous occasions in the years 1943–1944, the Soviets would invite Polish partisans to talks, then disarm them and some times execute the Polish partisan leaders. Nevertheless, some Poles who had been taken by force to work as slave labourers in Nazi Germany – such as in the case of Stefan Kubiak – escaped their German captors and joined Soviet partisan units as an opportunity to fight back against their oppressors.

=== Relations with Ukrainian nationalists ===
The Ukrainian Insurgent Army (UPA) formed in 1942 as a military arm of the Organization of Ukrainian Nationalists engaged in armed conflicts with Soviet partisans and the Polish resistance. While the UPA initially attempted to find a common anti-Soviet ground with Nazi Germany against the USSR, it soon was driven underground as it became apparent that the Germans' intentions for Ukraine were to establish a German colony with a subjugated local population, not an independent country as the UPA hoped for. As such, the UPA was driven underground and fought both the Nazi occupiers and the Soviet forces (including partisans) at the same time.

Later, the UPA and Soviet partisan leaders tried to negotiate a temporary alliance, but Moscow's NKVD Headquarters began harshly suppressing such moves by its local commanders. With both sides becoming established enemies, the Ukrainian civil population was primarily concerned with their survival.

=== Relations with the locals in Baltic states ===
Soviet partisan relations with the population of the Baltic countries were complex. The Soviet government annexed these territories in August 1940 and faced increasing resistance after repressive actions against the Baltic populations. The German offensive in the Baltic was swift and effectively defeated the Soviet forces stationed there. But over time, the number of Soviet underground workers increased. Their ranks, as in the other occupied territories, grew at the expense of the NKVD sabotage groups that were being abandoned, escaped prisoners of war. The local population also became increasingly dissatisfied with Nazi Germany.

Soviet forces focused on communicating with the local population. In August 1941, regular radio programs began in Latvian from Moscow. The newspaper For Soviet Latvia began to be published.

According to the Daugavpils Regional Commissioner in his report of 20 May 1942:

“The activities of the partisans in the Latgale region are rampant. There are daily reports that clashes with guerrilla groups occur in different places, which are partially parachuted or crossed the border or consist of prisoners of war who escaped from camps and armed by local residents. The number of fleeing increases every day. The guerrillas do not seek more shelter from the population, but organize their bases in impassable forests and wetlands, from where they are attacking settlements."

In November and December 1943, punitive expeditions were organized against Oshkaln partisans, and police from Riga province were mobilized. Partisans maneuvred and retreated to the Zalveskie forests (40 km west of Jekabpils). Due to the support of the local population, the Oshkaln partisans withstood difficulties of the winter of 1943/44.

Latvian headquarters of the partisan movement reported that in the summer of 1944, partisans of eastern and central Latvia directly rescued more than 3,220 from being transferred to western Latvia, and also 278 Soviet soldiers were liberated from captivity, and they immediately joined partisan detachments. In the woodlands in the northeast of Latvia, about 1,500 families of civilians were hiding under the direct protection of the detachments of the 1st Partisan brigade.

Their involvement in actions that affected the civilian population (for example, the killing of the Polish civilians in Kaniūkai and the destruction of the village of Bakaloriškės). The anti-Soviet resistance movements in the Baltic states, known as the Latvian or Lithuanian partisans, (established before the Soviet re-occupation in 1944), and local self-defence units often came into conflict with Soviet partisan groups. In Estonia and Latvia, almost all the Soviet partisan units, dropped by air, were either destroyed by the German forces or the local self-defense units.

In eastern and south-eastern Lithuania, Soviet partisans constantly clashed with Polish Armia Krajowa (Home Army) partisans; AK did not recognise any territorial changes after 1939 and considered this region as a legal part of Poland, while the Soviets planned to annex it into the Soviet Union after the war. Only in April 1944 did Polish and Soviet partisans start coordinating their actions against the Germans.

Some historians assert that the Soviet reactions to returning partisans were not better than for Soviet POWs. However, most of the partisans were included in Soviet regular forces. A lot of former POWs avoided repressions because of joining the partisan units after the escape. In 1955, a pardon was given to all returned prisoners of war and Nazi collaborators.

== Historical assessment ==
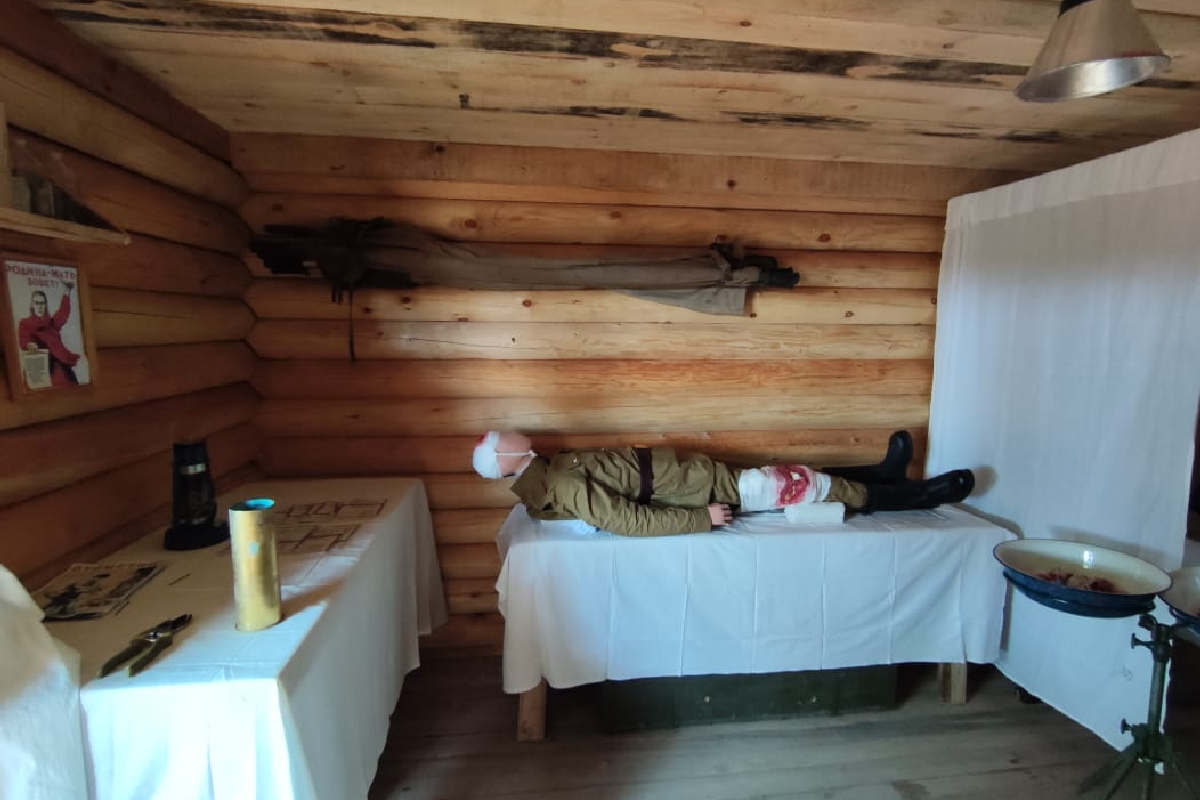
Soviet partisan village reconstruction in Rostov Oblast, Russia

With the German supply lines already over-extended, the partisan operations in the rear of the front lines were able to severely disrupt the flow of supplies to the army that acted deep into Soviet territory. In the second half of the war, major partisan operations were coordinated with Soviet offensives. Upon liberation of parts of the Soviet territory, the corresponding partisan detachments usually joined the regular Army. According to Soviet sources, the partisans were a vital force of the war. From 90,000 men and women by the end of 1941 (including underground) they grew to 220,000 in 1942, and to more than 550,000 in 1943.

The Soviet partisan activity was a strategic factor in the defeat of the German forces on the Soviet-German front. During the summer and autumn of 1942, when partisan warfare was not at its peak, the German Army devoted about 10 percent of its overall strength in fighting partisans, including 15 regular and security divisions and 144 security and police battalions. At the same time, the total strength of German and Italian forces in North Africa was 12 divisions. The partisans made significant contributions to the war effort by interrupting German plans to exploit Soviet territories economically. German forces obtained only one-seventh of what they looted from other European countries. While about $1 billion worth of food and other products were expropriated from Soviet territories by the Germans, more than $26 billion worth of goods and services were extracted from other European countries.

The partisans rendered substantial help to Soviet Army forces operating at the front by conducting damaging strikes against the German rear area communication network. Partisan activities combined with the Soviet Army's increasing offensive success helped to inspire the local population in occupied territories to join or support the struggle against the German occupation. According to historian Leonid Grenkevich, This partisan warfare on so vast a scale was unprecedented in Russian history. In the end, it was a genuine people's war. In general, the populace supported the partisan fighters by providing them not only moral support, and care and attention, but also food and masses of intelligence information.

According to historian Geoffrey Hosking, "All in all, the Soviet peoples displayed between 1941 and 1945 endurance, resourcefulness and determination which may be well beyond the capacities of economically more advanced nations. They won the war partly because of, partly in spite of, their leaders . . . The war showed the Soviet system at its best and at its worst."

Historian Matthew Cooper argued that, "The guerrilla was not simply a man fighting for his country; he was a political being struggling for a powerful and pervasive cause, against his own race as well as against the enemy. Militarily, he was to assist the progress of the Red Army by creating unbearable conditions in the enemy's rear; politically he was to be the champion of the class struggle in the furtherance of the Communist millennium. The Soviet partisans were representatives of the Soviet regime and evidence that neither it nor ideology was defeated."

The partisan movement succeeded in accomplishing its ideological tasks. US Air Force historians N. F. Parrish, L. B. Atkinson, and A. F. Simpson remarked, "Aside from direct or indirect damage to the German war machine, the Moscow-controlled partisan movement was the sole effective means by which the Soviet government could maintain a measure of control of, and extract varying degrees of loyalty from, the Soviet populations behind the German lines." The historian J. Armstrong also highly praised Soviet partisans ’efforts in this field, stating, "The great accomplishment of the partisans in the psychological field was their major contribution in turning the population of the occupied territories against the Germans."

Polish historian Marek Jan Chodakiewicz: alleges that the "Soviet-allied guerrillas routinely engaged in plundering peasants. He argues that they "lacked popular support" and claims that such allegations have been "eliminated from the standard Soviet narrative about them". The book Soviet partisans in 1941–1944 by Polish author Bogdan Musial was criticized by Belarusian media for denigrating the partisan movement.

== Partisan commemoration and legacy ==
=== Commemorative holidays ===
Partisans and Underground Fighters Day (Russian: День партизан и подпольщиков) is a holiday in Russia, celebrated on 29 June since 2010, celebrating the veterans of Partisan units throughout the USSR. It was established by the State Duma in March 2009 at the initiative of the Bryansk Regional Duma. On 11 April 2009, President Dmitry Medvedev made the act into law. It officially marks the anniversary 1941 directive of the Council of People's Commissars signed on this date declaring the intention to create partisan detachments.

The Day of Partisan Glory (Ukrainian: День партизанської слави) is celebrated in Ukraine on 22 September, first appearing on the Ukrainian calendar in October 2001 after an order came from President Leonid Kuchma. In 2011, the main celebrations dedicated to the Day of Partisan Glory and the 70th anniversary of the partisan movement were held in the city of Putivl in the Sumy Oblast of Ukraine.

=== Partisan honours ===
The Medal "To a Partisan of the Patriotic War" was a Soviet award with two classes on introduced on 2 February 1943 for partisans who demonstrate exemplary performance in war.

=== Parades ===
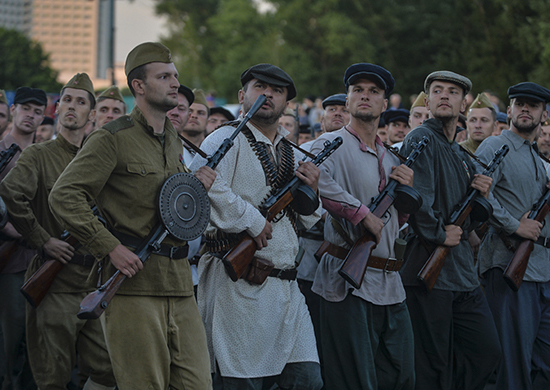
Soldiers depicting Belorussian partisans during a parade in Minsk on the 75th anniversary of the Liberation of Belarus in 2019.

Today, reenactments of the famous Partisans Parade are currently held every year by youth unions, university students and reenactment groups. Every five years, reenactors from the Armed Forces of Belarus take part in the Minsk Independence Day Parade as part of its historical part, dressed in the uniforms of Partisan formations and marching under with weapons from that era. Both the uniforms and the weapons are provided by the Belarusfilm studio. This was done at the 2014 and 2019 jubilee parade editions was done for the first time in 2020 for the Victory Day Parade. During the 2020 Moscow Victory Day Parade, the banners of the Zheleznyak Partisan Detachment and three Red Army units who participated in the Minsk Offensive were carried by personnel of the Honor Guard Company of the Armed Forces of Belarus on Red Square.

== See also ==
- Bandenbekämpfung
- Come and See
- Leśni
- People's war
- Resistance during World War II
- Soviet partisan united formation
  - Partisan brigade / partisan regiment
    - Partisan detachment
      - Partisan group
- Young Guard (Soviet resistance)
- Chinese resistance
- Yugoslav Partisans
  - Croatian Partisans
  - Macedonian Partisans
  - Slovene Partisans
- Slovak partisans
- Italian Partisans
- Greek Resistance
- Yuke-Tepe (1025)
