= Vladimir Gil =

Soviet officer and Nazi collaborator

Vladimir Vladimirovich Gil
- Born: 11 June 1906; Vileyka, Vilna Governorate, Russian Empire
- Died: 14 May 1944 (aged 37); Nakol, Byelorussian SSR
- Other names: I.G. Rodionov, Radjanoff
- Military career
- Allegiance: Soviet Union (1926–1941; 1943–1944); Germany (1941–1943)
- Branch: Red Army, Waffen-SS
- Service years: 1926–1944
- Rank: Polkovnik (colonel)

Vladimir Vladimirovich Gil (Russian: Владимир Владимирович Гиль; born 11 June 1906, Vileyka – died 14 May 1944, Nakol), also known by the pseudonyms I.G. Rodionov or Radionov (German: Radjanoff), was a colonel of the Red Army and the founder and leader of the German-backed Union of Russian Nationalists and the 1st Russian Waffen-SS "Druzhina". Gil and his unit later went over to the Soviet partisans, and he died in combat with the Wehrmacht.

== Early life ==
According to his file in the Central Archives of the Russian Ministry of Defence (TsAMO), Vladimir Gil was born 11 June 1906 in the town of Vileyka, in the Vilna Governorate of the Russian Empire. Gil's German prisoner of war documentation places his birth on the same date but a year earlier and in Chaadaevka, a settlement in Penza Oblast, Russia. During World War I, Gil's family moved to Babruysk and then to Daraganovo, near Mogilev. He joined the Komsomol in 1921 and graduated from nine classes at the Daragan-Slutskaya rail station, where he would work.

== Service in the Red Army ==
Gil joined the Red Army in 1926 and enrolled as a cadet on 15 October 1926 at the Borisoglebsko-Leningrad cavalry school. He was appointed a platoon commander in the 32nd Beloglinsky cavalry regiment on 1 September 1929 by order of the Revolutionary Military Council. He joined the Communist Party in 1931 with the ID number 0268567. On 19 September 1937, Gil was ordered to the Mikhail Frunze Military Academy, from which he graduated with honors in 1940.

In 1938, the Ministry of Defense promoted Gil to captain, major the next year, and then finally lieutenant colonel on 28 February 1940. On 19 May 1940, Gil was appointed the head of fifth headquarters unit of the 12th Cavalry Division and then as head of the 8th Mechanized Brigade on 28 November. On 5 March 1941, he was named chief of the 12th Mechanized Corps's operations department. Gil was again reassigned on 22 March 1941, this time as chief of staff for the 229th Rifle Division, under the 69th Rifle Corps in the 20th Army.

== Capture and defection to Nazi Germany ==
The 229th Rifle Division, at the time assigned to the Stavka reserve, was stationed on the Dnieper River in June 1941. It was surrounded near Talachyn, and Gil was captured 16 July 1941 near Bogushevsk and sent to Oflag 68. Gil later alleged that he had been wounded when he was captured, but his German documentation states that he was healthy when he was captured. He became the commandant of the Russian prisoners at the camp, where inmates lived in very poor conditions and suffered a typhus outbreak. By April 1942, only 2,000 of the original 60,000 inmates at the camp remained.

In autumn 1941, Gil initiated the creation of the anti-Bolshevik "Russian National People's Party", to be supervised by SS-Sturmbannführer Hans Shindowski, head of the local Sicherheitsdienst (SD) office. Its members were 25 former Red Army officers who had previously been selected by the SD for sabotage operations. A group from the party were sent to a training camp near Breslau and a month-long study inside Germany at the beginning of 1942. On 20 April 1942, the party reformed as the Union of Russian Nationalists (BSRN), still under Gil's leadership.

On 1 May 1942, 100 Russian prisoners of war (90 officers and 10 enlisted men) joined the BSRN. They were released from prison and dressed in Czech uniforms. Former Red Army officers were reduced in rank to basic infantry platoon members. Accompanied by SD officers, they were moved to Parczew and Lublin for training. After three weeks, the unit received the name "Druzhina" and was assigned to hunting Jews and Polish GL partisans in the same area. By the end of summer 1942, the Druzhina had become a brigade-strength unit. Gil at this time took the pseudonym Radionov, the surname of his mother's mother.

Late in August 1942 the Druzhina Brigade was sent to Smolensk to guard a former city prison. The next month, they arrived at Bykhaw, near Mogilev, and participated in anti-partisan activities throughout the area. 150 German and Byelorussian policemen were assigned to the unit while it was in Mogilev. Erich von dem Bach-Zelewski praised the unit's actions in Mogilev his diaries. The effectiveness of the Druzhina Brigade has been questioned by historians since the war.

== Return to the Red Army ==
In the summer of 1943, the Druzhina Brigade redeployed to Dokshytsy to fight the Zheleznyak guerrillas, led by Ivan Filippovich Titkov. In early July, Titkov opened dialogue with Gil and then convinced him to defect back to the Soviet Union. After a week of correspondence, Gil secured guarantees from Titkov and then approached his brigade commanders about defecting. The Druzhina Brigade defected on 16 August 1943 by Gil's order and popular sentiment within the unit. He placed its German staff and White Russian members under arrest. Most of the Germans were hanged outright and the rest were taken by the guerrillas to be interrogated by the NKVD. One of the men arrested was former Major General Pavel Vasilyevich Bogdanov, later executed in Moscow with the Whites.

In its first action as a partisan unit, Gil's brigade attacked the German garrisons at Dokshytsy and nearby Krulevshchyna railway station. The Germans counterattacked with tanks and air support, nearly surrounding the unit.

On 20 August, the Central Headquarters of the Partisan Movement sent a working group by air to integrate the former Druzhina Brigade. Two days later, Gil met with Ivan Petrovich Genenko and Roman Naumovich Machulsky, members of the Communist Party of Byelorussia. The 1st Anti-Fascist Partisan Brigade was officially formed on 26 August and its members swore allegiance to the Soviet Union. Gil was awarded the Order of the Red Star on 16 September 1943 for the defection of his unit and its activities as a partisan unit.

== Legacy ==
In the years after World War II, Gil became the subject of many legends that his son, Vadim, has repeatedly denied. Rumors have persisted such as that Gil was a Soviet agent covertly inserted into German-occupied Soviet territory and were noted by Soviet historian Mikhail Tokarev. Tokarev discovered that the NKGB had quickly infiltrated the 1st Russian Waffen-SS and that Gil's first lieutenant was an informer.
