= Zaliznyak =

Zaliznyak or Zalizniak is a Ukrainian-language surname. Notable people with the surname include:

- Andrey Zaliznyak (1935–2017), Russian linguist
- Anna Zaliznyak, Russian linguist
- Leonid Zaliznyak, Ukrainian archeologist with specialization in the Mesolithic
- Maksym Zalizniak, 18th-century cossack from Zaporizhzhia
- Olena Zalizniak, Ukrainian-Canadian educator

== See also ==
- Zheleznyak, Russian version of the surname
