= Operation Concert =

- Part of the Rail War and the Eastern Front of World War II
Date	19 September – late October 1943
Location	Soviet Union (present day Belarus, Baltic states, and Karelia), Crimea, Leningrad and Tver oblasts
Result	Soviet victory

Belligerents
Soviet Union	Germany

Commanders and leaders
Panteleimon Ponomarenko	Unknown

Casualties and losses
Unknown	150,000 rails

Operation Concert was a Soviet military operation during World War II, conducted as part of the Rail War sabotage campaign. It was one of the largest operations of World War II in its effects on the incapacitation of railroad communications in the logistics of the enemy rear. The operation was conducted through a plan developed by and under the management of the Central Headquarters of the Partisan Movement at the Stavka VGC (Chief Military Committee), and was coordinated with the forthcoming offensive of the Soviet troops in the Smolensk and Gomel directions and intended crossing of the Dnieper as part of the Summer–Autumn Campaign of 1943 (1 July – 31 December). The operation included participation of 193 partisan detachments and groups totalling more than 210,000 men, women, and children.
