= Maria Fedecka =

Maria Aniela Fedecka (1904, Moscow – 21 December 1977, Warsaw) was a Polish social worker, member of Workers' Defence Committee. During World War II she was an activist in the Polish Underground and Polish anti-Holocaust resistance in Wilno (now Vilnius, Lithuania). During German occupation she helped save many Jewish children as well as the poverty-stricken peasants of Lebioda, her husband's hometown situated near Lida (now in Belarus). In 1987, Maria Fedecka was honoured by Yad Vashem as Righteous among the Nations for the help she had brought to Jewish children and their families.

After the war, in 1945, Fedecka took part in the "repatriation action" (the return to Poland of Poles who did not want to remain in the territories annexed by the Soviet Union). She also came to the aid of those young people who were threatened with prison and deportations to "gulags" in the USSR.

In PRL she lived mainly in Sopot (near Gdańsk in Poland). In 1947 she took the initiative of creating, with Zdzisław Grabski and Michał Pankiewicz, the League for the Struggle Against Racism quickly dismantled by authorities for political reasons. The League was composed of a small number of Polish intellectuals, aware of the moral threat for the country's renewal in the aftermath of Kielce and other antisemitic incidents. In the 1970s Fedecka was active in the anti-communist opposition in People's Republic of Poland.

== Bibliography ==
- Jędrychowska Anna – Zygzakiem i po prostu, (In Zigzag and Straight Ahead), Czytelnik,1965, p. 320–321 and 338–339.
- Kac Daniel – Wilno Jerozolimą było – Rzecz o Abrahamie Sutzkeverze (When Wilno was Jerusalem – in praise of Abraham Sutskever) Fundacja Pogranicze,16-500-Sejny 2003, ISBN 83-86872-51-9, p. 98–99 and 144–145.
- Wawer Pola – Poza gettem i obozem, (Outside the Ghetto and the Camp). Wydawnictwo Myśl, Warszawa 1993, ISBN 83-85233-25-3, p. 96–97.
- Wroński Stanislaw & Zwolakowa Maria, Polacy i Zydzi, 1939–1945 (Poles and Jews, 1939–1945). Ksiązka i Wiedza, Warszawa 1971, p. 320.
- The Encyclopedia of the Righteous Among the Nations: Rescuers of Jews during the Holocaust, Poland. Volume editors: Sara Bender and Shmuel Krakowski. Yad Vashem, Jerusalem 2004, p. 212.

== External sources ==
- Website devoted to life of Maria Fedecka (pl), (de), (en)
- Maria Fedecka at Yad Vashem website
