= Destruction of the German garrison in Lenin =

1942 partisan uprising in German-occupied Belarus

The Lenin Garrison was destroyed on 12 September 1942 during a partisan uprising against the Nazis.

== Background ==
After the liquidation of the Lenin ghetto in the Pinsk region (now in Belarus) and the murder of its inhabitants on 14 August 1942, about 30 Jews remained alive in Lenin, as they continued to work directly for the Germans as tailors, shoemakers, builders, and photographers. At this time Lubov Rabinovich was ordered to train a group of Belarusian apprentices to take over his trade within one month.

== Attack and destruction ==
A German garrison of 100 people and 30 local policemen was based in Lenin to protect the town. The Soviet Kalinin partisan unit planned an attack on the garrison, assisted by two neighboring units (in total about 150 people). The Jewish fighter Boris Ginsburg was the liaison between the partisan units. On 12 September 1942, the German garrison was suddenly attacked and the partisans inflicted heavy losses, apparently killing 3 German officers (including commandant Grossman), 14 soldiers and 13 policemen. The ghetto quarter was burned down. The remaining Jews fled to the woods with the partisans. Among them were the shoemaker "Leizer der Shuster" and his wife and daughter; the tailor Mordechai Kravetz; Fanya Lazebnik (Faye Schulman); the Slutzky family; and the Rabinovich family. In the Kotovsky unit within the Pinsk Soviet partisan formations, some of the escapees worked as tailors. Fanya Lazebnik joined the Molotov partisan unit and after recovering her camera during a second raid on Lenin also documented her life in the partisans. Fanya Lazebnik migrated to Canada after the war and also published a memoir of her experiences.

== Notes ==
This article incorporates text from the United States Holocaust Memorial Museum, and has been released under the GFDL.
