= Zheleznyak =

Zheleznyak (Russian: Железняк, Ukrainian: Железняк) is a gender-neutral Slavic surname. Notable people with the surname include:

- Sergei Zheleznyak (born 1970), Russian Member of Parliament
- Yakiv Zheleznyak (born 1941), Soviet sport shooter

== See also ==
- Zaliznyak, Ukrainian version of the surname
