= Partisan brigade =

The partisan brigade was the main organisational form of the Soviet partisan units during World War II. Partisan brigades were active from shortly after Operation Barbarossa in June 1941 through the end of the war in 1945.

On the BSSR territory, the first brigade-like unit («Pavlovskiy harrison») was created in January 1942 (Aktsyabrski dist. of Palesye province). The most notable Czechoslovak partisan brigade was the Jan Žižka partisan brigade, formed from a core of Soviet-trained paratroopers dropped into Slovakia in August 1944. After its operational area was liberated in April 1945, the Žižka partisans were employed in tracking down German soldiers and was not disbanded until 26 May, almost three weeks after the German surrender.

The brigades comprised from several hundred to several thousand fighting persons in 3—7 detachments (rarely called battalions).

The emphasis on the brigades was put in order to enhance the offensive capabilities of the partisan units, to facilitate their cooperation, mutual coordination of activities, more effective radio communications and logistical support.

== Sources ==
- А.Л. Манаенкаў. Партызанская брыгада ў Вялікую Айчынную вайну // Беларуская энцыклапедыя: У 18 т. Т. 12. — Мінск: БелЭн, 2001. — 560 с. p. 114. ISBN 985-11-0198-2 (т.12). The source references: Беларусь у Вялікай Айчыннай вайне 1941—1945: Энцыкл. Мн., 1990. С. 398—452.
- Hrošová, Marie (2012), Na každém kroku boj (1st ed.), Nové Město u Chlumce nad Cidlinou: Český svaz bojovníků za svobodu, ISBN 978-80-260-2483-5
