= Soviet partisan detachment =

Soviet partisan detachment (1941—1944) (Russian: партизанский отряд; Belarusian: партызанскі атрад), was the main organisational form of the Soviet partisan units.

Numerical and structural complement of the partisan detachment varied, with usual number of about 100 to several hundred personnel, organised in the 3—4 companies, 3 platoons each, 3 sections each. Detachment was commanded by commander and commissary, who were aided by staff head and staff, and by deputies on recon, diversions and logistics with their respective sub-units. Bigger detachments had heavy weapons sub-units.

Each detachment maintained primary structures of the Communist Party and Komsomol.

From 9 September 1942 the Belarusian Headquarters of the Partisan Movement classified detachments by their numerical complement: 100–150, 151–350, 351 and more personnel.

By their objectives, detachments could be: common (unitary), diversionist-recon, cavalry, artillery, staff, reserve, local defense, marching.

On the BSSR territory (as in the 1941 borders), 1255 distinguishable detachments had operated in 1941–1944, majority of them in the structures of the partisan brigades, but 203 separately.

The bigger detachment in certain conditions could be expanded into a partisan brigade, or into a partisan regiment, such as some of the 800+ personnel detachments in the Mahilyow Province since August 1943.

== Sources ==
- А.Л. Манаенкаў. Партызанскі атрад у Вялікую Айчынную вайну // Беларуская энцыклапедыя: У 18 т. Т. 12. — Мінск: БелЭн, 2001. — 560 с. p. 124. ISBN 985-11-0198-2 (т.12). The source references: Беларусь у Вялікай Айчыннай вайне 1941—1945: Энцыкл. Мн., 1990. С. 456–474. Партизанские формирования Белоруссии в годы Великой Отечественной войны (июль 1941—июль 1944). — Мн., 1983.
- General of Army Prof. Kozlov M.M. (ed.), Great Patriotic War 1941-1945 encyclopaedia (Velikaya Ottechestvennaya Voina 1941-1945 entsiklopedia), Moscow, Soviet Encyclopaedia (Pub.), 1985
