= Central Headquarters of the Partisan Movement =

WWII Soviet military control organ

The badge of the Red Army also served as the emblem for the CHPM

The Central Headquarters of the Partisan Movement (Russian: Центральный штаб партизанского движения (ЦШПД), romanized: Tsentral'nyj shtab partizanskovo dvizheniya (TsShPD)) was the central organ of military control of the Soviet partisans, resistance movements who fought against German occupation in World War II. Located at the Headquarters of the Headquarters of the Supreme High Command, the GKO created it in May 1942 in order to unite the leadership of the Soviet partisan forces behind enemy lines. The State Defense Committee disbanded it in January 1944 due to most partisan detachments operating in Ukraine and Belarus, which already had their own headquarters for the partisan movement.

== Objectives ==
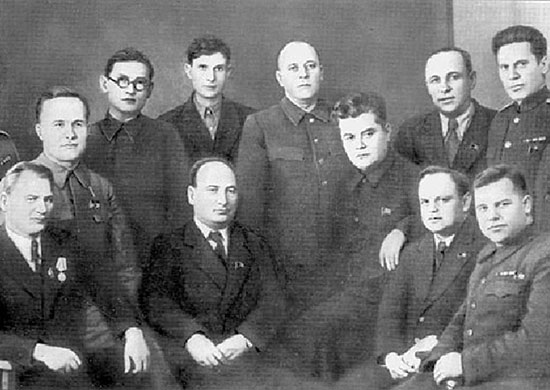
Leaders of the partisan movement of republics, territories, regions in the occupied territory of the Soviet Union. From left to right: sitting - Popov, Zhavoronkov, Ponomarenko, Boytsov, Chernousov, Matveev; stand - Sprogis, Bulatov, Suslov, Seleznyov, Sologor, Vershinin, Snechkus.

The original order to establish the TsShPD, signed on 30 May 1942, stated that the partisan movement's main task was to disorganize and disrupt the rear of the enemy by:

1. Destroying enemy communication lines (collapsing bridges, destroying railways, arranging train wrecks, attacking enemy vehicles and horse-drawn vehicles)
2. Destroying enemy means of communication (telephones, telegraphs, radio stations)
3. Destroying warehouses / supply dumps (carrying ammunition, equipment, fuel, food)
4. Destruction of material assets at enemy airfields
5. Keeping the Red Army units informed on the location, strength, and movements of enemy troops

On 5 September 1942, the order "On the tasks of the partisan movement" (О задачах партизанского движения) was signed by the People's Commissariat of Defense. It played a significant role in shaping the partisan movement in its later stages, when it was much more militarily effective. It ordered:

1. In order to disrupt the movement on railways and disrupt regular traffic behind enemy lines, arrange railway accidents by all means: undermine railway bridges, blow up or burn station facilities, and blow up, burn and shoot locomotives, wagons, and tanks at stations and siding. In case of railroad wreck, destroy manpower, equipment, fuel, ammunition and other cargo, as well as surviving steam locomotives and wagons. On highways and dirt roads, undermine and burn bridges and viaducts; destroy ghats and other man-made structures. Destroy transports delivering ammunition and fuel. Steal any horses. If it is impossible to use weapons, transports or cargoes, render them unusable by all possible means.

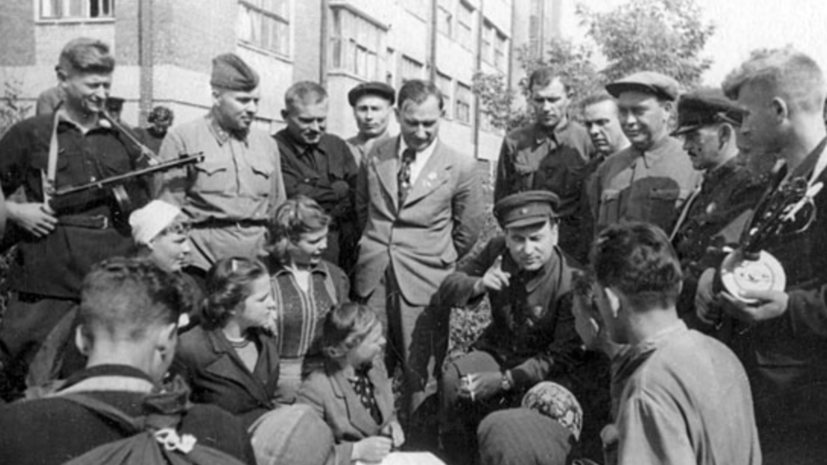
Head of the Central Headquarters Panteleimon Ponomarenko with Belarusian partisans. Moscow, September 17, 1942.

1. Whenever possible, destroy military garrisons, headquarters and institutions, troops, and separately follow officers and soldiers guarding transports and warehouses.
2. Destroy warehouses and bases of weapons, ammunition, fuel, food and other property, garages and repair shops.
3. Destroy communication lines on railways, highways and dirt roads, destroy communication equipment, cut and take away wires, cut and burn telegraph poles, and kill radio stations and their staff.
4. Attack airfields and destroy aircraft, hangars, bombs and fuel depots, as well as the flight personnel and guard airfields.
5. Destroy every kind of economic commands, enemy foragers, and commands and agents for the seizure of grain. attack the wagons and warehouses containing bread; if possible, distribute bread to the population, and if this cannot be done, completely destroy it.
6. Partisans have not yet reached the cities. Partisan detachments, individual organizations, and saboteurs must penetrate into all cities, large and small, and widely deploy intelligence and sabotage work there. Destroy and burn communication centers, power plants, boiler plants, water supply, warehouses, fuel tanks and other objects of military or economic importance.
7. Ruthlessly kill or capture fascist political figures, generals, significant bureaucrats, and other traitors to the Motherland who are in the service of the enemy. Constantly monitor the generals and major officials. Find out where and on what path they go, with whom they spend time with, their behavior, and who protects them and how.
8. Conduct reconnaissance and intelligence work for the Red Army:
  - Carefully select people capable of conducting covert reconnaissance work and put them into service in local administrations and institutions created by the Germans, in factories, depots, stations, marinas, telegraphs, airfields, bases and warehouses, in the protection of German officials, in the Gestapo and its schools, as well as all other institutions and bodies serving the army or local administration of the German authorities;
  - Constantly keep track of the location and movement of enemy forces and supplies by rail and road; find out the number, type of troops and numbering of units, the number and type of military equipment, direction of movement and time of movement; establish the order and strength of protection of military echelons and transports;
  - Establish the precise locations of enemy troops and headquarters, their name and numbering, and institutions and bodies of the occupying authorities;
  - Make observations of enemy airfields: establish their location, number and types of aircraft permanently or temporarily based on a given airfield, airfield equipment, auxiliary and special vehicles, fuel and oil reserves, as well as the protection of airfields on the ground and from the air;
  - Perform reconnaissance work on towns and major population centres with the aim of finding the number, name, type, and commander of troops in their garrisons and anti-aircraft defences, as well as gathering intelligence on any military factories or workshops;
  - Find where and what sort of defensive lines have already been constructed, their composition in an engineering sense, weapons, communications, and whether they are garrisoned or not;
  - Monitor and accurately record the results of bombing by the Soviet air forces;
  - Take all opportunities to steal orders, reports, operational maps, and other enemy documents.
9. Along with work in warfare, conduct political work amongst the population: clarify the truth about the Soviet Union, the merciless struggle of the Red Army and the entire Soviet people against the fascist invaders, and about the inevitable death of bloodthirsty invaders. Expose the false German propaganda and describe the facts, instilling hatred and bitterness towards the German invaders. Organize the publication of newspapers, leaflets and other printed materials in the occupied territory.

== Structure ==
- The reconnaissance department was responsible for establishing new military formations arriving at the front, troop groupings and regroupings, monitoring enemy communications which included discovering where they prepared their defensive lines, deploying and relocating airfields and depots, monitoring the Nazis' readiness for a chemical war, the combat effectiveness of field and security units of the enemy, and the political and economic situation in the occupied territory of the USSR.
- The operational department was responsible for supervising the combat activities of partisan formations, both through the relevant headquarters of the partisan movement, and directly. It was engaged in the creation of raid partisan formations and detachments, the sending of organizational and sabotage groups and the reorganization of partisan formations, determined new areas of activity for them and assigned them combat missions, and was also responsible for monitoring the execution of orders of the head of the Central Command and Control Department. The chief is Colonel I.I. Naumov. The deputy chief is Lieutenant Colonel V.P. Shestakov and Major Ivolgin The operational department included three areas:
  1. Karelo-Finnish, Latvian, Lithuanian, and Estonian SSRs, along with the Leningrad region. The head of the direction was Captain Kolmykov.
  2. Byelorussian SSR. The head of the department was Major Kryukov.
  3. Kalinin, Smolensk and Oryol regions, along with the Crimean ASSR. The head of the department was Major Rumyantsev.
- The department also created:
  - A group on the application and implementation of guerrilla warfare methods and modern diversionary means
  - A group that was responsible for accounting
  - A topographic map warehouse
  - Department of sabotage tactics and technology (May 11, 1942)
- The operations department developed specialized operations for the partisans to carry out. For example: Operation Rail War, Operation Concert, Operation Winter Concert, Operation Desert, etc.
- Representations of the TsShPD at the military councils of fronts (since September 6, 1942). Due to the fact that the front lines did not coincide with the borders of the republics and regions, it was decided to have representative offices of the Central Command and Control Department under the Military Councils of the Fronts, whose leaders were part of them
- Political Administration of the TsShPD (since September 28, 1942)

== Structures subordinate to the TsShPD ==
There were a number of structures initially subordinate to the TsShPD: (Note: Dates of creation and disbandment are not included in this citation, those still need a reliable source.)

- The Ukrainian headquarters of the partisan movement (May 30, 1942. Operated until 1943)
- Bryansk headquarters of the partisan movement; (April 23, 1942. May 13, 1943 disbanded)
- The western headquarters of the partisan movement
- Kalinin headquarters of the partisan movement
- Leningrad headquarters of the partisan movement
- Karelian-Finnish headquarters of the partisan movement

On September 28, 1942, a number of republican, regional and front headquarters of the partisan movement were created:

- Ukrainian headquarters of the partisan movement (leader Timofei Strokach);
- Belarusian headquarters of the partisan movement (Belorussian). (Head Kalinin, Peter Zakharovich);
- Lithuanian headquarters of the partisan movement (leader Antanas Sniečkus);
- Latvian headquarters of the partisan movement (leader Arturs Sproģis);
- Estonian partisan movement headquarters;
- Karelian-Finnish headquarters of the partisan movement (leader S. Ya. Vershinin);
- Leningrad headquarters of the partisan movement;
- Oryol headquarters of the partisan movement;
- Smolensk headquarters of the partisan movement;
- Stavropol headquarters of the partisan movement;
- Crimean headquarters of the partisan movement;
- Astrakhan headquarters of the partisan movement;
- The Polish headquarters of the partisan movement (leader Sergey Pritytsky)

== TsShPD Archive ==
The archive of the Central headquarters of the partisan movement is stored in the funds of the Russian State Archive of Socio-Political History: Moscow, Bolshaya Dmitrovka Street, Building No. 15.

== Notes ==
1. Dates of creation and disbandment are not included in this citation, those still need a reliable source.
