= Frank Blaichman =

Polish resistance fighter

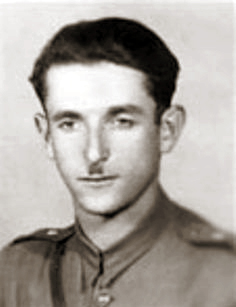
- Frank Blaichman in 1945.
- Born: Franek Blajchman; 11 December 1922; Kamionka, Poland
- Died: 27 December 2018 (aged 96); Manhattan, New York City, U.S.
- Other names: Ephraim Blaichman, Frank Bleichman
- Known for: Jewish partisan, Head of the Prison and Camps Department at the Security Office in Kielce, memoir author

Frank Blaichman (11 December 1922 – 27 December 2018), also known as Ephraim Blaichman, occasionally spelled Frank Bleichman, and in Polish Franek or Franciszek Blajchman, was a Polish-Jewish leader of a communist armed organization during World War II and a Holocaust survivor. In post-war communist Poland, Blaichman was the head of the Prison and Camps Department at the Security Office in Kielce.

Blaichman’s portrayal of his activities in communist resistance and security have been questioned and have given rise to several controversies in Poland.

== The Holocaust ==
Frank Blaichman was born in Kamionka, Poland, in December 1922. His grandmother owned a grocery store and his father was a grain merchant. He was 16 years old at the time of the German invasion of Poland in September 1939.

Although German officials issued decrees that limited Jewish travel outside of Kamionka and required Jews to identify themselves by wearing armbands, Blaichman took a number of risks in order to help his parents and six brothers and sisters. He rode his bicycle from the neighboring farms and villages to Lubartów (six miles east) and Lublin (12 miles south) where he bought and sold goods such as honey, chickens, butters, grains, meat, tobacco, yarns, and sugar. Blaichman was able to travel among the population without being recognized as a Jew (he refused to wear the Star of David armband and traveled without the necessary permits). He was assigned to work two days a week on a nearby estate with crops, but instead he paid someone to fill his place and continued to engage in underground trading.

In October 1942, the Kamionka Jewish council (Judenrat) informed the Jewish residents that they would be resettled in the Lubartów Ghetto. Blaichman slipped out of Kamionka and went to a gentile farmer in the village of Kierzkówka who offered him assistance (the family of Aleksander and Stanisława Głos, which would later be listed among the Polish Righteous Among the Nations). He later learned that the Jews of Kamionka had not been relocated to the Lubartów Ghetto but rather were deported on trains to an unknown destination. Blaichman heard that a group of Jews were hiding in the forest, so after two days with the farmer, he made his way to the forest and found more than one hundred Jews living in an encampment of small bunkers in the forest. He realized that the group was in constant danger. Blaichman encouraged the group to form a defense unit to guard the camp even though they had no firearms. In December 1942 the group managed to acquire firearms from a local Polish farmer. (However, according to another biography, it was only in summer of 1943 that Blaichman left the Głos family and joined the resistance). In late January Blaichman and some of his fellow Jewish partisans received shelter from Polish farmer Bolesław Dąbrowski; however the Germans raided their shelter and many Jews were killed, along with Dąbrowski who was executed by Germans shortly afterward. Five decades later, in 1994, the Yad Vashem Institute posthumously awarded Bolesław Dąbrowski the title of Righteous Among the Nations.

Over time, Blaichman's unit increased in size. They were joined by refugees from Markuszow and expanded to sixty fighters. In the spring of 1943, Blaichman encountered Samuel Gruber. Gruber's group consisted of men who had fought in the Polish Army and knew how to use explosives and mines. The two groups joined together and became a more effective fighting force. By September 1943, the communist People's Army realized that the Blaichman and Gruber groups could be a dependable ally in the fight against the Germans and provided them with supplies that had been parachuted in by the Soviet air force. Now equipped with hand grenades, explosives, land mines, machine guns, and ammunition, the group could be even more successful in fighting the Germans.

In 1944, Blaichman's group received an order from the People's Army to move east and join forces with another Jewish partisan unit in the Parczew area commanded by Yechiel Grynszpan. Gruber was appointed deputy commander and Blaichman, at the age of 21, became the unit's youngest platoon commander. In July 1944, the Soviet Red Army advanced from the east and entered the Parczew forest. Also that month, Lublin was taken from the Germans by the Soviets, and Blaichman's partisan group entered the city.

Near the end of the war and immediately afterward (April to 19 July 1945) he has worked for the Polish communist secret police (Office of Public Security), as the temporary head of the Department of Prisons and Camps (Wydział Więzień i Obozów) in the Kielce's Voivode Office of Public Security (Wojewódzki Urząd Bezpieczeństwa Państwowego, WUBP).

After the war, Blaichman married Cesia Pomeranc, who had also lived in the Parczew area, and six years later they settled in the United States; Blaichman found work as a builder in New York.

Blaichman published a memoir in November 2009, Rather Die Fighting: A Memoir of World War II. In August 2010, a Polish translation, Wolę zginąć walcząc. Wspomnienia z II wojny światowej, was released in Poland. The book has been described as controversial in Poland, where it has led to a number of controversies.

He died in Manhattan on 27 December 2018, aged 96.

== Controversy ==
Following the publication of his memoir in Poland, some parts of his account, particularly related to his and his unit interactions with the Home Army, have proven to be controversial. Stanisław Aronson, a former Polish-Jewish officer of the AK, called the charges made in the book against the Home Army "absurd", a view which has been endorsed by historians Jan Żaryn and Waldemar Paruch. In turn, Blaichman portrayal of his activities in communist resistance has been questioned, and it has been alleged that he was a member of a criminal gang associated with communist Gwardia Ludowa which focused on forcefully obtaining provisions from the local populace and clashed with the Polish resistance. Perhaps most controversially, Blaichman also mentions that at one point he shot dead two AK soldiers, which has led to demands for this case to be investigated by the authorities. The spokesman for the Polish Institute of National Remembrance has declared that Blaichman's book will be investigated to determine whether he is guilty of communist crimes. The case was described as still open as of February 2019.

In 2019 the US Secretary of State, Mike Pompeo, praised Blaichman in his speech in Poland as an exemplary "Polish survivor who settled in the USA and achieved an American dream", which was described by Polish press as a political blunder, given Blaichman's controversial association with the communist security apparatus.

== See also ==
- Parczew partisans
