= Amelin =

Amelin may refer to the following places in Poland and Russia:

- Amelin, Łódź Voivodeship (central Poland)
- Amelin, Lubartów County in Lublin Voivodeship (eastern Poland)
- Amelin, Parczew County in Lublin Voivodeship (eastern Poland)
- Amelin, Masovian Voivodeship (eastern-central Poland)
- Amelin, Kursk Oblast (western Russia)

It may also refer to:

- Amelin (surname)
