= Cesana =

Cesana may refer to:

- Cesana Brianza, municipality in the Province of Lecco, Lombardy, Italy
- Cesana Torinese, municipality in the Metropolitan City of Turin, Piedmont, Italy
- Cesana Pariol, venue for bobsleigh, luge and skeleton during the 2006 Winter Olympics in Turin, Italy
- Cesana San Sicario, venue for biathlon during the 2006 Winter Olympics in Turin, Italy

== People ==
- Franco Cesana (1931–1944), Italian Jew, youngest partisan to die in the Italian Resistance
- Renzo Cesana (1907–1970), Italian actor, writer, composer and songwriter
- Silvia Cesana (born 1999), know professionally as Sissi, Italian singer-songwriter

== See also ==
- Cesano
- Cesena
