= Lubartów Ghetto =

Nazi ghetto in occupied Poland

The Lubartów Ghetto
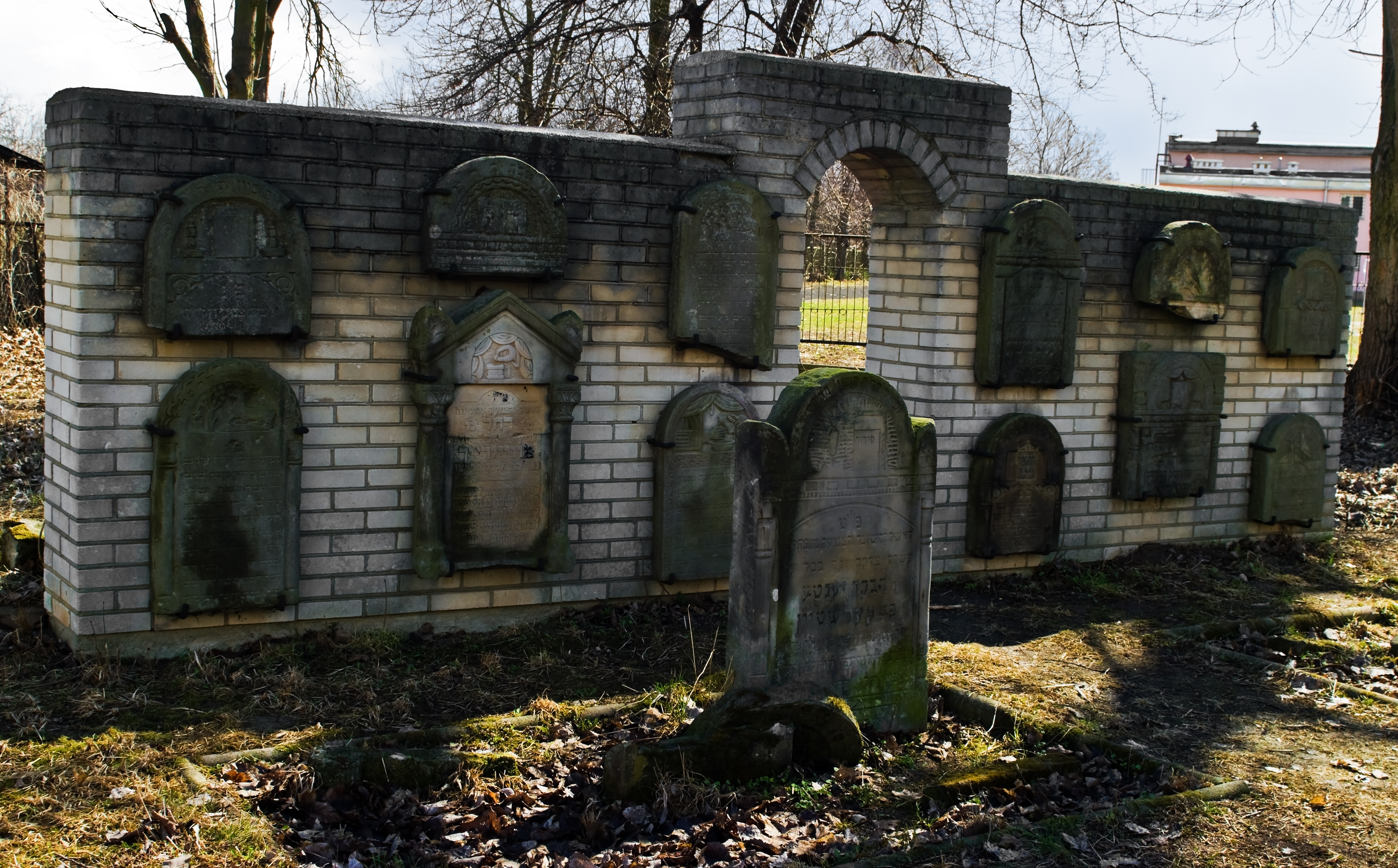
- Jewish cemetery in Lubartów

- Lubartów location west of Majdanek during the Holocaust in Poland

- Location of Lubartów in Poland today
- Location: Lubartów, German-occupied Poland; 51.28°N 22.36°E
- Incident type: Imprisonment, forced labor, starvation, transit to extermination camps
- Organizations: Schutzstaffel (SS)
- Camp: Auschwitz
- Victims: 4,500 Polish Jews

Lubartów Ghetto was established by Nazi Germany in occupied Poland during World War II, and existed officially from 1941 until October 1942. The Polish Jews of the town of Lubartów were confined there initially. The ghetto inmates also included Jews deported from other cities in the vicinity including Lublin and Ciechanów and the rest of German-occupied Europe for the total of 3,500 Jews in its initial stages including 2,000 Jews from Slovakia. In May 1942 additional transport from Slovakia with 2,421 Jews arrived.

The Lubartów Ghetto was one of hundreds of such ghettos established in the course of the Holocaust in occupied Poland. The maximum number of prisoners at any one time was 4,500 according to Virtual Shtetl. The ghetto was dissolved when all its prisoners – men, women, and children – were sent to the Belzec extermination camp among other secretive killing centres established by the SS, to be murdered under the guise of "resettlement".

== Background ==
The first mention of the Jewish community in Lubartów comes from 1592. By 1676 there were 80 Jews in the town, operating 15 breweries. The Beth din rabbinical court was also established. In the 17th and 18th centuries the Jews received numerous privileges consecutively from Michał Korybut Wiśniowiecki (in 1678), Józef Lubomirski (in 1688) and Janusz Aleksander Sanguszko family (in 1780, and 1796). There were three synagogues and two Jewish cemeteries, one of which had not been used since the 19th century. In the interwar period the town's population was 53.6 percent Jewish according to the national census with 3,269 Jews living there in 1921. By the time of the invasion of Poland in 1939 that number has already gone down to 42 percent due to migration flows.

The German army entered the town on 19 September 1939, early on in the attack against Poland. On the morning of 12 October 1939, the German army ordered all of the Jews to go to the market square where they were surrounded by machine guns. This allowed for the German army to ransack and rob Jewish-owned homes and businesses. This lasted all day.

== Deportation and execution ==
The deportation of Jews to the nearby towns of Firlej, Ostrów Lubelski, and Kamionka, started at the beginning of November 1939. All of the Jews were told to leave. There were, though, a few who stayed to work for the German Army. They were exiled from Lubartów until September 1940.

A Judenrat (German: for Jewish council) was set up in late 1939 for those Jews who remained. The first President, Jakub Modko Lichtenfel, did not stay at his post for long, and was soon replaced by Dawid Perec. The last Judenrat of Lubartów consisted of five members: Moshe Joel Edelman (President), Shlomo Ber Ciesler (Vice President), Izrael Ratensilber, Menashe Kosman, and Jechiel Weinberg.

The ghetto area around the two marketplaces of Lubartów were still in existence when the Jews returned from slave labour projects. A communal kitchen was organised for the now poverty-stricken Jews. Deportations were also conducted into the Lubartów Ghetto. An example of this is the transport of 1,000 Jews from Ciechanów. In addition, by May 1942, some 2,421 Slovak Jews had been deported to Lubartów.

The first deportation to a death camp aboard Holocaust trains took place on 9 April 1942, the last day of Passover. On the first day, 800 Jews who did not have work cards were ordered to go to the railway station, from which they were taken to Belzec extermination camp. The last one of the train deportations to Belzec was on 11 October 1942, with 3,000 Jews sent off to be murdered. Some of these deportees were sent to Majdanek, with the others going to the death camp in Treblinka. Jews that were found to be hiding were shot. In total, the number of Jews found after last deportation numbered 300. After a while, the Jews that were found were instead deported to the Piaski ghetto.

The members of the Judenrat, and their families, were deported to Łęczna. They were shot in November 1942, while Jews who worked for the German gendarmerie were shot on 29 January 1943. After the last deportations, the synagogues and cemeteries were destroyed. The gravestones were used in a pavement at a Wehrmacht base. Lubartów was declared Judenfrei by the Nazis in February 1943.

=== Escape, rescue and resistance efforts ===
Only forty Jews had survived the liquidation of the Lubartów Ghetto. Some of them were rescued by the Poles, others hid in the forests. Josek Honiksblum and his wife Bluma survived hidden by the Czekański family in their home at Lipowa 3 Street. Dora Wajnbert with her sister Noma and her one-and-a-half-year old baby were rescued by Jan Sienkiewicz living at Legionów 55 Street. Among the Jews who escaped the mass murder thanks to their Christian neighbours were Berek Tunkielszwarc, Doba Apfeld, Szloma and Dawid Cyngiel, Izaak Pud, Josek Wajnberg with daughter Frajdla, Owadia Tołbiasz, Gerszon Kopfe with wife Rachela and daughter Sura Kopfe, as well as Chana Goldsztein and his wife Bluma. All stayed in Lubartów. Others survived by hiding with the Poles in villages surrounding the town, including Berek Tunkielszwarc, Doba Apfeld, Szloma and Dawid Cyngiel, Izaak Pud, Josek Wajnberg with daughter Frajdla, Owadia Tołbiasz, and Chana Goldsztein.

Frank Bleichman, whose family lived in a nearby village and was eventually deported to the Lubartów Ghetto, avoided their fate, and received aid from the Aleksander and Stanisława Głos, as well as from Bolesław Dąbrowski and his family, all later recognized as Polish Righteous. Dąbrowski was executed by the Germans for the crime of helping the Jews. Bleichman went on to become an active member of the Jewish resistance operating in the Lubartów area.

Not all rescue attempts were equally successful. The Polish farming family of Jan Galat and his wife Marianna, who sheltered the two members of the Rozgold family, were caught by Orpo on 20 November 1942. The Germans murdered the Jews on the spot, and Jan Galat was taken to Lubartów where shortly afterward he was publicly hanged for helping Jews.

== See also ==
- List of Jewish ghettos in German-occupied Poland
