= Starościn =

Starościn may refer to the following places:

- Starościn, Lublin Voivodeship (east Poland)
- Starościn, Lubusz Voivodeship (west Poland)
- Starościn, Opole Voivodeship (south-west Poland)
