= Borek, Gmina Kamionka =

Borek
- Village
- Location within Poland
- Coordinates: 51°25′17.22″N 22°34′53.49″E
- Country: Poland
- Voivodeship: Lublin
- County: Lubartów

Borek [ˈbɔrɛk] is a small village in Gmina Kamionka (Kamionka Commune), Lubartów County in Poland in Lublin Voivodeship. A small group of farmsteads 2 km (1 mi) southwest of Kamionka, on the north side of the country road to Samoklęski. The farmsteads are next to the edge of a small wood.
