= Gmina Kamionka =

Gmina Kamionka Kamionka Commune
- Gmina
- Flag Coat of arms

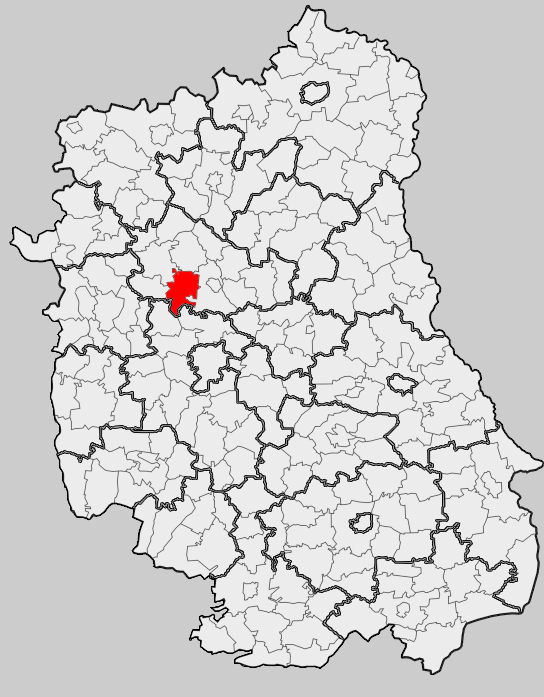
- Location within the county and voivodeship
- Coordinates (Kamionka): 51°28′18″N 22°27′46″E
- Country: Poland
- Voivodeship: Lublin
- County: Lubartów
- Seat: Kamionka

Area
  - Total: 111.85 km^{2} (43.19 sq mi)

Population (2015)
  - Total: 6,448
  - Density: 57.65/km^{2} (149.3/sq mi)
- Website: http://www.kamionka.lubelskie.pl

Gmina Kamionka is a rural gmina (administrative district) in Lubartów County, Lublin Voivodeship, in eastern Poland. Its seat is the village of Kamionka, which lies approximately 10 kilometres (6 mi) west of Lubartów and 26 km (16 mi) north of the regional capital Lublin. It lies on the generally flat Lubartów plain.

The gmina covers an area of 111.85 square kilometres (43.2 sq mi), and as of 2006 its total population is 6,433 (6,448 in 2015).

== Neighbouring gminas ==
Gmina Kamionka is bordered by the gminas of Abramów, Firlej, Garbów, Lubartów, Michów and Niemce.

== Villages ==
The gmina contains the following villages having the status of sołectwo: Amelin, Biadaczka, Bratnik, Ciemno, Dąbrówka, Kamionka (sołectwos: Kamionka I, Kamionka II and Kamionka III), Kozłówka, Kierzkówka, Kierzkówka-Kolonia, Samoklęski, Samoklęski-Kolonia, Siedliska, Rudka Gołębska, Starościn, Stanisławów Duży, Syry, Wólka Krasienińska and Zofian.

== Places of interest ==
Andrzejówka A few houses on a track and some outlying farmsteads in an area of flat arable land. There is a small wood to the immediate west. Siedliska is about 1 km to the west.

Biadaczka A scattering of farmsteads almost enclosed by the arms of a small wood. On the other side of the wood, to the north, is a large lake. Staroscin is about 2 km to the south/southwest. Biadaczka Kol. A scattering of farmsteads on a rabble land to the east of the wetlands of a small stream. Staroscin is about 1.5 km to the southwest.

Blisze A small group of farmsteads immediately to the north of the palace of Kozłówka, in open, flat arable land. A small wood separates it from the palace. Most buildings are in the traditional wooden style, with one or 2 brick, post WW2, buildings. This place is not separately sign-posted, but comes under Siedliska.

Borek A small group of farmsteads 2 km southwest of Kamionka, on the north side of the country road to Samokleski. The farmsteads are builtup against the edge of a small wood.

Bratnik A scattered group of farmsteads across an area of arable land, about 2 km southwest of Kozłówka.

Brzozowiec A group of farmsteads lying south of the country road between Kozłówka and Nowodwor, 1 km to the east of Kozłówka.

Dąbrówka A group of houses and some outlying farmsteads in the confluence of the valleys of the Minina and Ciemiega rivers, surrounded on most sides by the mixed forest of Kozlowiecki park Krayobrazowy.

Dębczyna Houses and farmsteads along a track parallel to highway 809, just over 1 km to the west of Samokleski. Between these two settlements is an area of meadows with several north flowing streams cutting through it. To the west is part of a small forest.

Dębowiec A group of farmsteads lying between 2 arms of a forest, some 2 km south of Kozłówka. Sachalin is to the immediate northwest.

Grabów-Las A few farmsteads scattered over an open area in a shallow valley, surrounded by woodlands.

Kamionka A village which used to be a town and still retains the grid layout of streets, which makes it different from most local villages which are usually of a ribbon development along one road. The first mention comes in 1450, and it received its town rights in the late 15th century – which it held until 1863. in 1531 the current parish church was built, replacing an earlier wooden church: from 1459. The wooden church had been a Protestant church for a while after 1570. In the 18th century the village was famous for linen, but it had a poor location for trading. To the north of the village is a large wood of coniferous trees. There is also a small settlement consisting of 2 farmsteads at the edge of a large wood, 2 km to the north, with the same name.

Kamionka II A small scattering of farmsteads in an area of relatively flat, open arable land, bounded in the north by a small wood. A stream runs across the settlement area form southeast to northwest.

Kierzkówka A group of houses at a junction and many small farmsteads scattered along a track to the northwest. To the east of the village is the river Minina, and to the north and west are some small woods. the Minina flows through an area of meadows, but the rest of the area is arable.

Kierzkówka-Kolonia A group of houses and outlying farmsteads about 1 km to the south of Kierzkowka

Koszary A few farmsteads lying across the arable land between Staroscin and Zofian.

Kozłówka A village with one of the most beautiful magnates residences in Poland. This residence of the Zamoyski family is a Baroque/Classical palace dates from the first half of the 18th century and extended in the 19th century. Unusual in Poland as most of the original furnishings and paintings remain. The palace and the park is now a museum of the Zamoyski family, but the museum also has one part dedicated to now unwanted communist sculptors and other art. The village itself is to the southeast of the palace and, whilst there are some houses alongside the road, this is an area of many farmsteads scattered over the gently undulating countryside. Between the palace and the main part of the village is a westerly flowing stream called the Parysowka. The south side of the settled area is bounded by a large forest, most of which is a national park "Kozłowiecki Park Krajobrazowy".

Kruk A few houses on a small track between Starościn and Wola Przybysławska. There is a small coniferous forest to the south and west and arable land to the north. The Church: and school of Staroscin lies just over 1 km to the east.

Krzywy Dąb A few farmsteads on either side of the country road from Kamionka to Kierrzkowka and Ciemno. There are woods to the east and west, and Kamionka lies 2 km to the southeast. Laski A couple of farmsteads in some clear arable land between 2 woods. Kamionka lies 3 km to the southwest, on the other side of the larger of the 2 woods.

Lubartowska A group of farmsteads surrounding a Church: to the north of a country road, 1 km east of Kozłówka. The country is arable and quite flat. There is the small river, Parysowka, just to the north.

Lucjanów A few farmsteads on the country road heading northeast out of Samokleski, just over a bridge from this village. To the south are lakes and to the north is a small wood.

Olszowiec A small group of farmsteads, with wetlands on the eastern and western sides of the settled area. To the south is a small wood, and the Minina flows through the wetlands to the east. The village of Kierzkowka is about 3 km to the southeast.

Padoły A small group of farmsteads on either side of a lane in open arable land, with a small wood to the north. Siedliska lies 1.5 km to the south.

Polny Młyn Half a dozen farmsteads on a short stretch of country road between 2 bridges, on the triangle of land formed by the confluence of the Minina and Parysowka rivers. The land is meadows and there is a wood to the south. Just across the Minina, to the west, is Kierzkowka. From the name, it is probable that there was once a mill here.

Przydawki A small group of houses and a few outlying farmsteads around a short track on the immediate northwest of Syry. At the western edge of this settlement is a forest. It lies in an area of meadows drained by several streams.

Rudka Gołębska A gathering of farmsteads on either side of highway 809, just north of the 2 bridges which take it over the Minina river and one of its tributaries. This settlement is about 3 km north of Samokleski.

Sachalin A small group of farmsteads at the north edge of a large forest, in an area of arable land. 2 km to the north is Kozłówka.

Samoklęski (or Sowoklęski) A ribbon development village on the north-south highway 809, with some development at the southern end where the road crosses the Minina river at the northern end of a large lake. To the west of the village is an area of wet meadows, whilst to the east is a small wood. The village was created in 1533. The then owner, Jozef Weysenhoff, lost the property at cards in 1891. There is a classical style manor house from the first half of the 19th century, the park of which contains many ponds within its 2 square kilometres.

Samoklęski II A small group of farmsteads on the eastern bank of a large lake, just north of where the Minina drains into it. To the east is a large forest - "Kozłowiecki Park Krajobrazowy". On the opposite bank of this lake, to the northwest, is Samokleski.

Siedliska A scattering of farmsteads along a couple of tracks in this almost flat arable country. There are small woods to the east and west, and a small stream to the north.

Starościn A village on highway 809 and some smaller roads, on either side of a stream. The school and the Church: are some distance away from the main road, under the eaves of a small wood. Church: Parafia rzymskokatolicka Matki Bożej (Bozej) Anielskiej, Staroscin, pow. Lubartow, woj. Lubelskie. This is the parish Church: of the Staroscin parafia, Michow dekanat.

Syry A ribbon development of houses with a group of farmsteads off to the southeast. To the west and south is a forest, and to the north is an area of partly wet meadows with several streams flowing through it. Church: Rzymskokatolicka. Part of Kamionka parafia, Michow dekanat.

Wólka Krasienińska A small village on the south side of the shallow Minina river valley. To the south is slightly undulating open arable land, while to the north is a small area of meadow, then the river, more meadows and then a large forest.

Zaolszynie A small group of farmsteads in open arable land less than 1 km to the northeast of Padoly.

Zofian A ribbon development village in arable land just to the south of Staroscin, with small woods to the west and a small, north flowing, stream on the eastern side of the village.
