= Kozłówka Palace =

Palace in Poland

Coordinates: 51°27′34.59″N 22°29′21.92″E

Zamoyski Palace
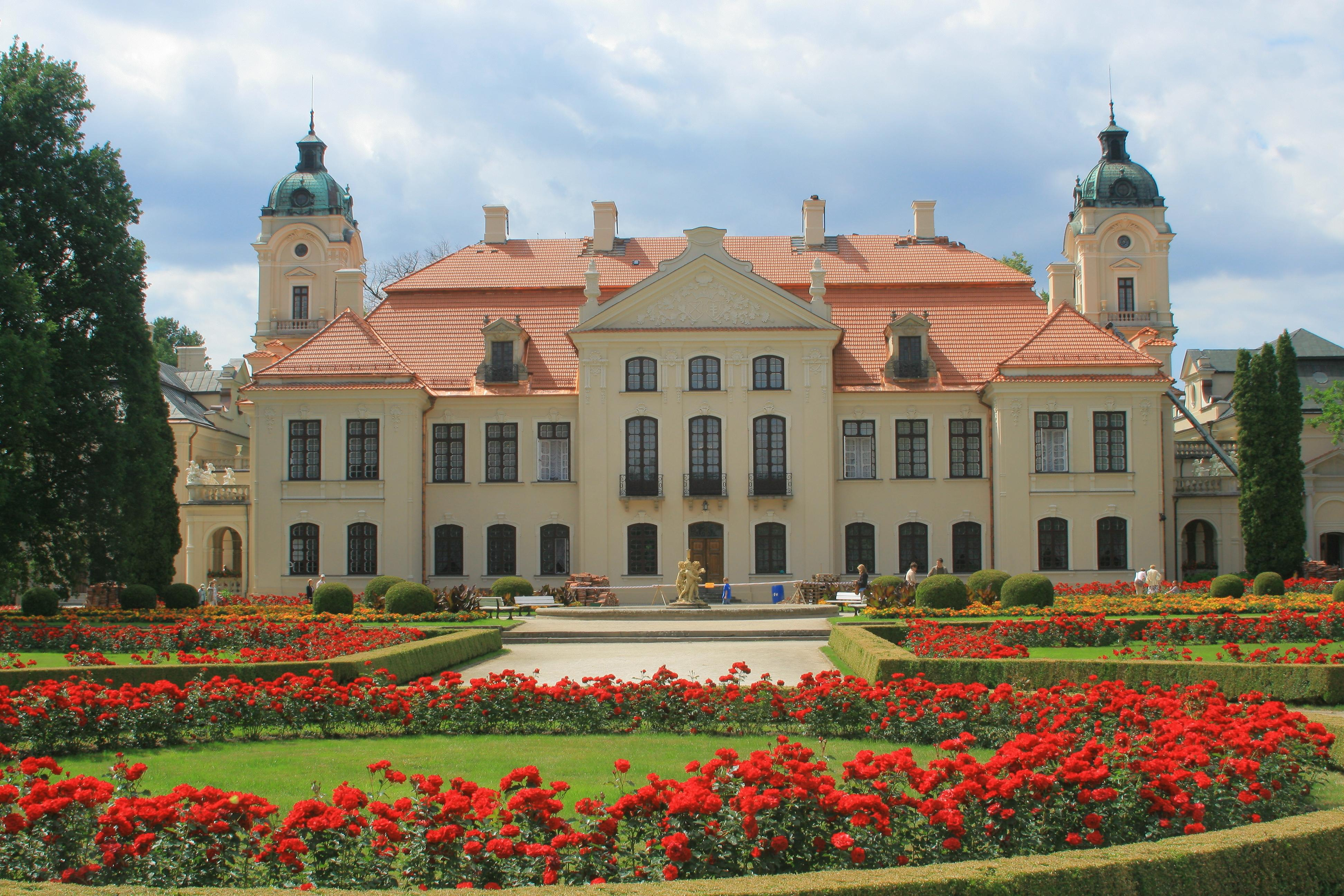
- View from the garden.
- Interactive map of the Zamoyski Palace area

General information
- Architectural style: Rococo and neoclassical
- Location: Kozłówka, Poland
- Construction started: 1735
- Completed: 1742

Design and construction
- Architect: Józef Fontana

Historic Monument of Poland
- Designated: 2007-04-25
- Reference no.: Dz. U. z 2007 r. Nr 86, poz. 573

Kozłówka Palace (pronounced: [kɔzˈwufka], Polish: Pałac w Kozłówce) is a large rococo and neoclassical palace complex of the Zamoyski family in Kozłówka, Lubartów County, Lublin Voivodeship in eastern Poland.

The palace was built between 1735 and 1742 and is one of Poland's official national Historic Monuments (Pomnik historii), as designated May 16, 2007, and tracked by the National Heritage Board of Poland. It currently houses the Zamoyski Family Museum in Kozłówka. The Kozłówka Landscape Park lies south of the palace complex.

== History ==
The original palace was built in the first half of 18th century for Michał Bieliński, voivode of Chełmno; its architect was Jozef II Fontana. It represents the characteristic type of baroque suburban residence built entre cour et jardin (between the entrance court and the garden). Its architecture is original - a merger of European art with old Polish building traditions. In 1799, the Palace was acquired by the aristocratic Zamoyski family. It belonged to the family up until 1944. The palace experienced a period of great prosperity during the times of Count Konstanty Zamoyski who remodelled the palace in order to turn it into one of the most monumental and representative magnate residences in Poland.

Between 1879 and 1907, the palace was rebuilt in Neo-Baroque style, the chapel was modified (modelled on the chapel at Versailles Palace); a theatre, a second outbuilding and an entrance gate were also added. The palace also features a unique sewers system from the turn of the 19th and 20th centuries, which made it possible for the owners of the property to have access to some of the earliest modern bathrooms in Europe.

In 1903, the Kozłówka entail was established by Tsar Nicholas II of Russia, which meant that the property belonging to the Zamoyski family could not be sold or divided and automatically passed by law to the eldest heir.

In 1928, the chairman of the Polish Gymnastics Society Sokół, Count Adam Michał Zamoyski, organized a training camp in the palace gardens for the Polish national gymnastics team in preparation for the 1928 Summer Olympics in Amsterdam.

From November 1944, when the last owners Count Aleksander Zamoyski and his wife Countess Jadwiga Zamoyska were forced to flee their palace, it became the property of the Communist regime, whose grip on Poland ended in 1989. It currently hosts the Zamoyski family museum.

The interiors of the palace were preserved despite the ravages of the German Nazi and Soviet Regimes from 1939 to 1989. The original opulent design and most of museum quality art from the Zamoyski family collections remain.

The surroundings of the palace also include a historic chapel, French Baroque garden, stables and a carriage house. The palace grounds also feature the Gallery of Socrealism, the largest collection of communist art in Poland featuring over 1,600 sculptures, paintings, drawings and posters.

== In popular culture ==
The palace served as a setting to a number of films and TV series including Janusz Morgenstern's 1967 series More Than Life at Stake, Konrad Nałęcki and Andrzej Czekalski's Four Tank-Men and a Dog (1966–1970), Janusz Majewski's 1970 horror film Lokis, Jerzy Antczak's 2002 biographical film Chopin: Desire for Love and John Daly's 2004 war drama The Aryan Couple.

== Gallery ==
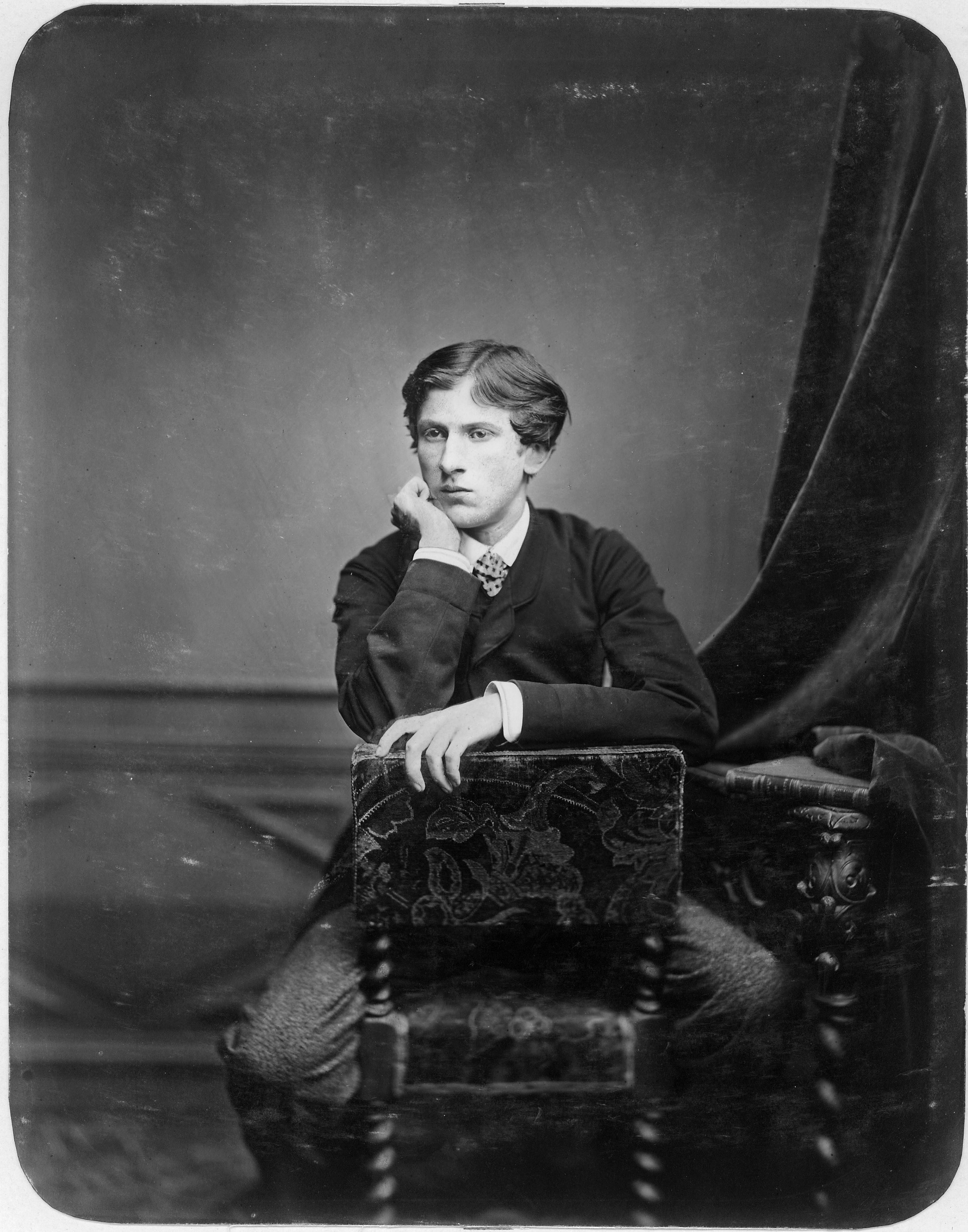
Konstanty Zamoyski (ca. 1864), the owner of the palace

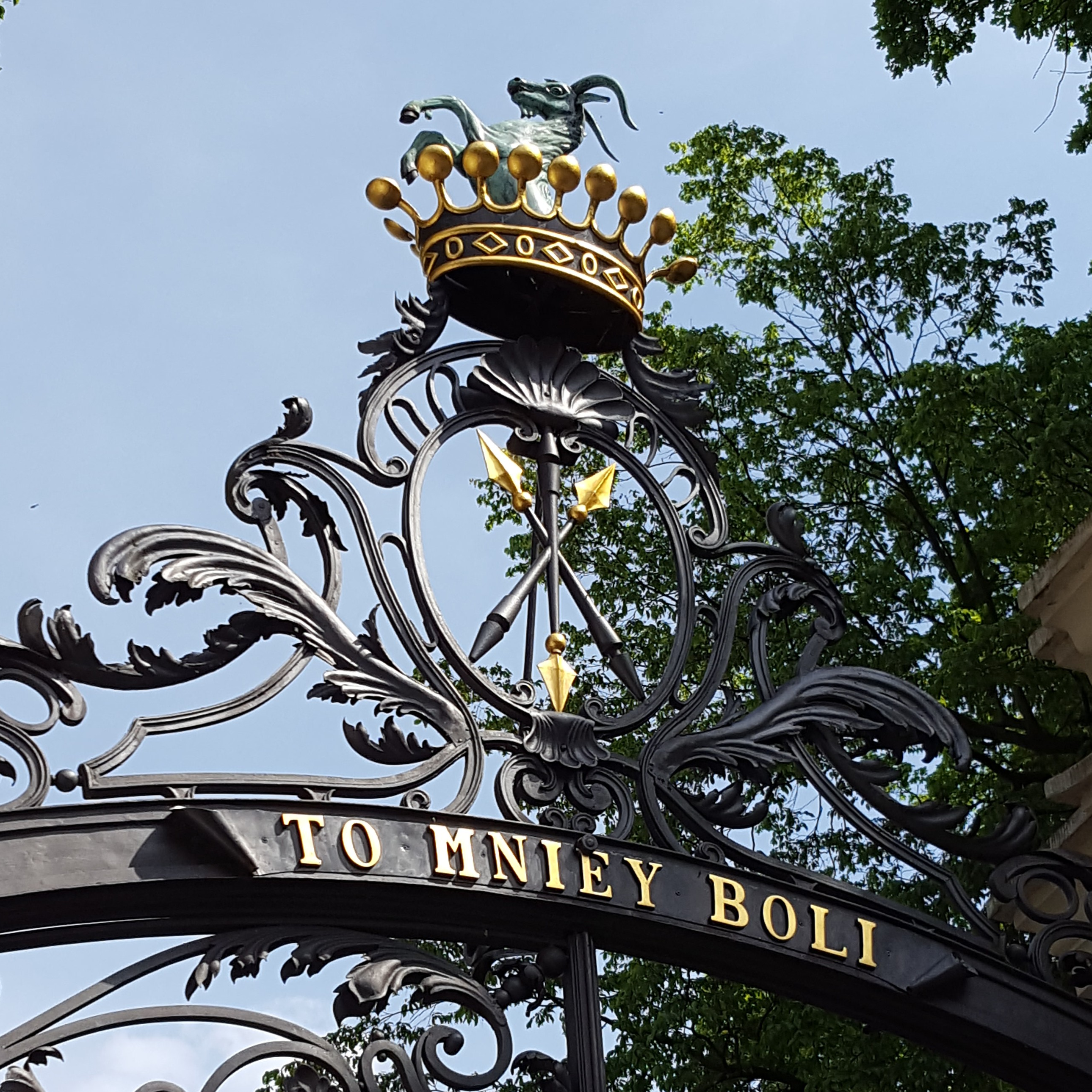
Main gate with the coat of arms of the Zamoyski family and motto "To mniej boli" (It Pains Less)

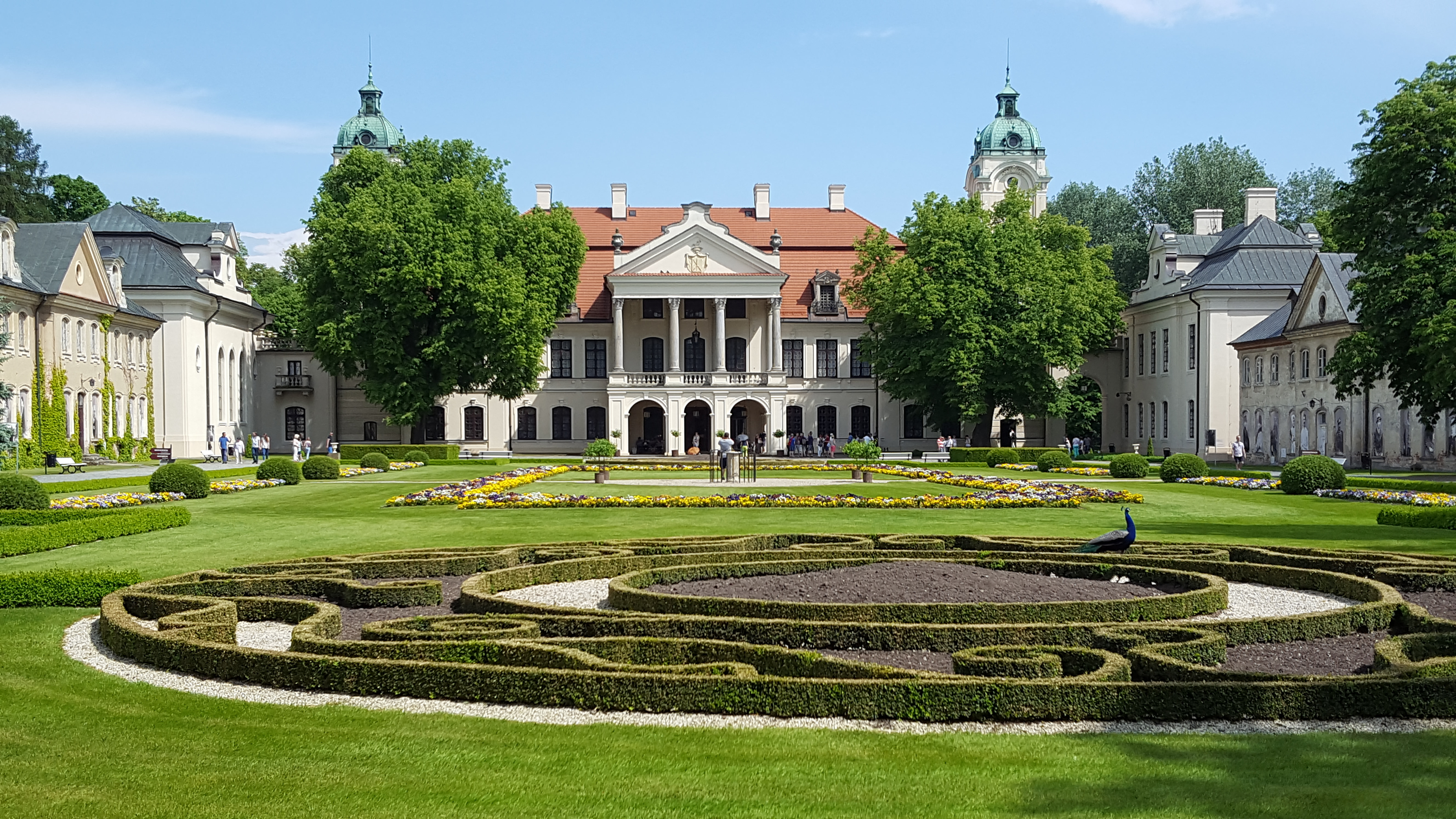
Kozłówka Palace - front

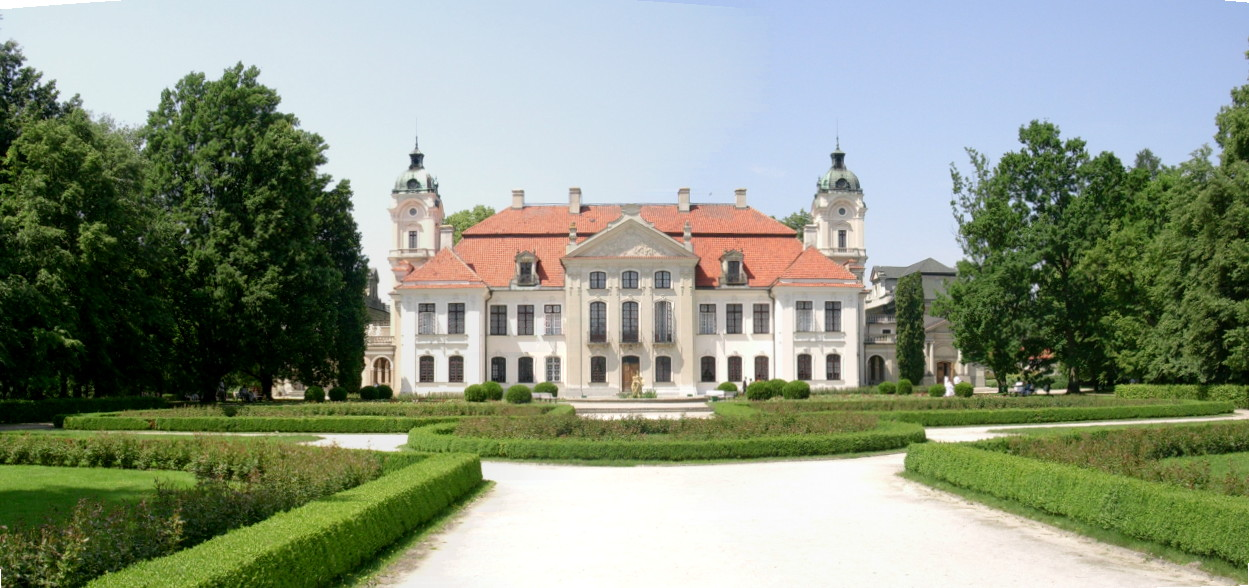
Garden façade

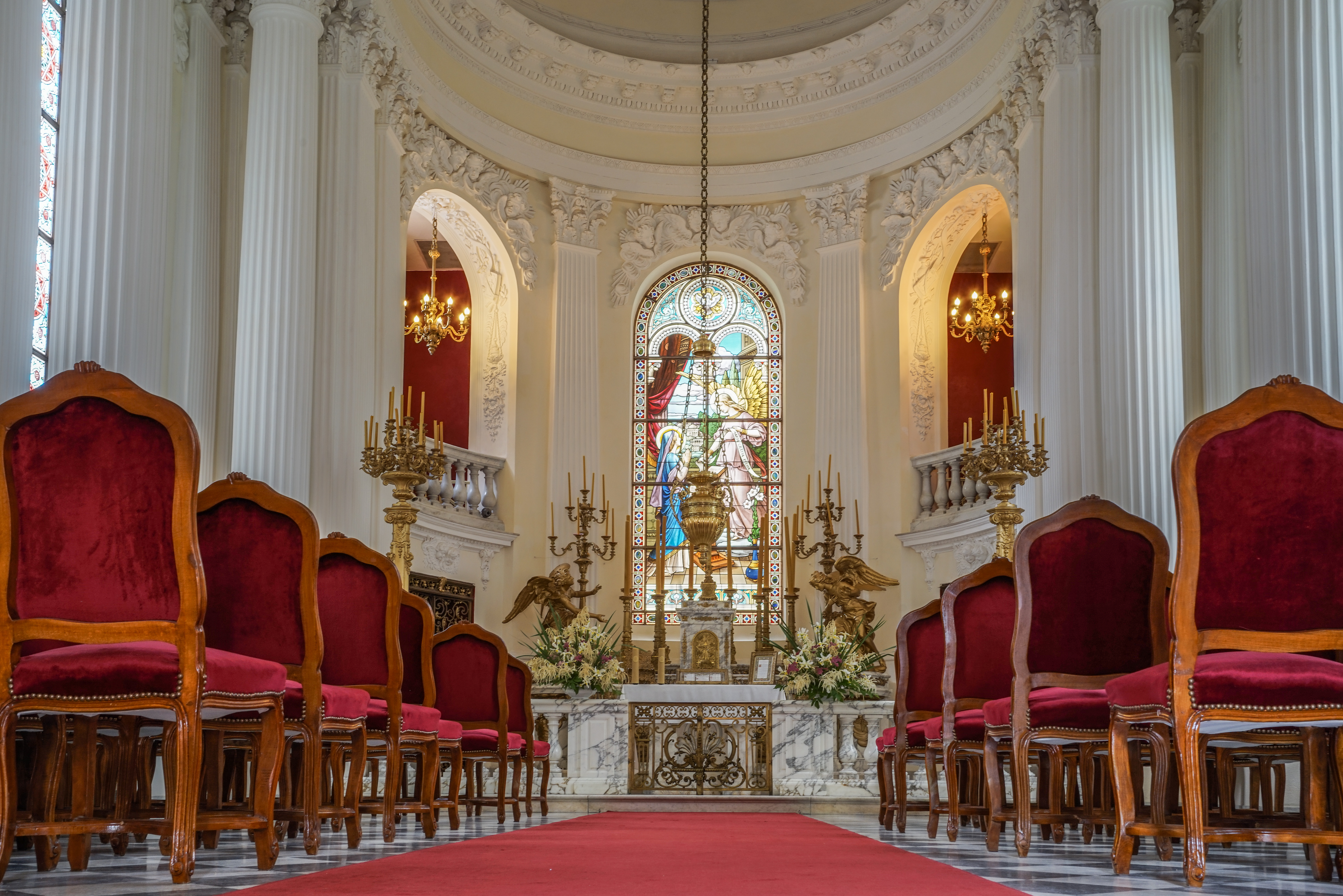
Palace chapel

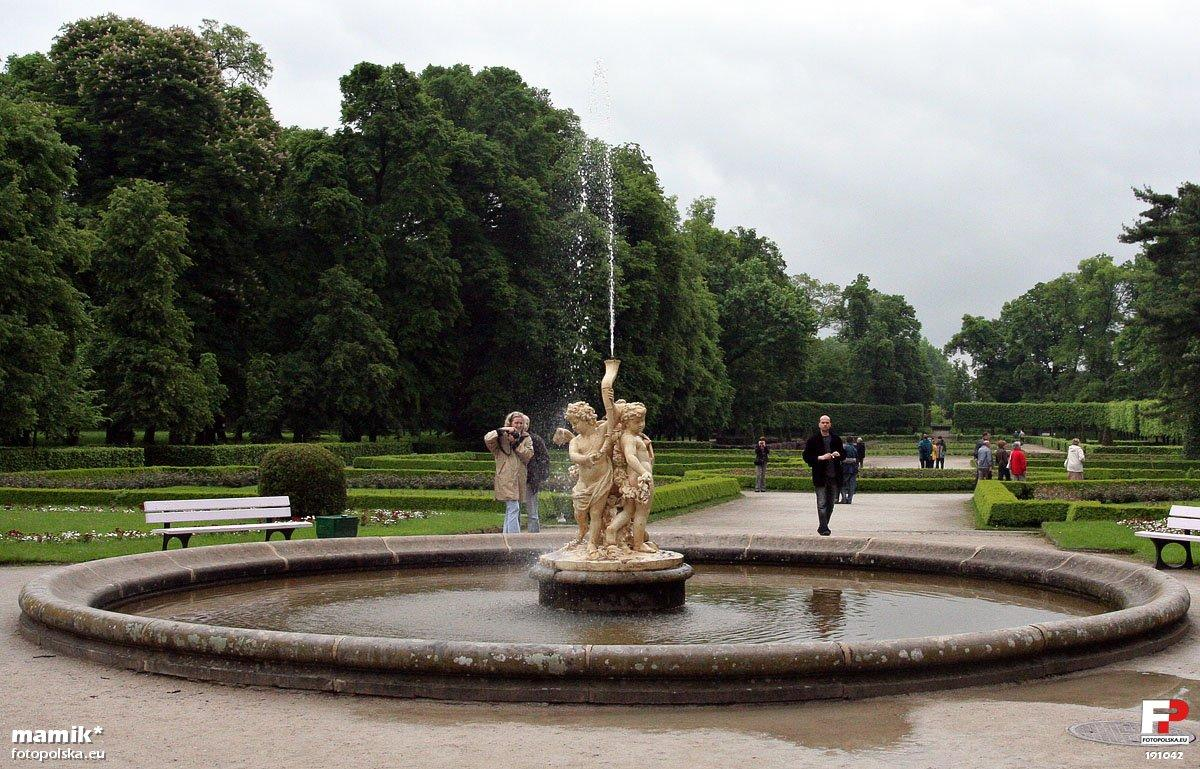
Fountain

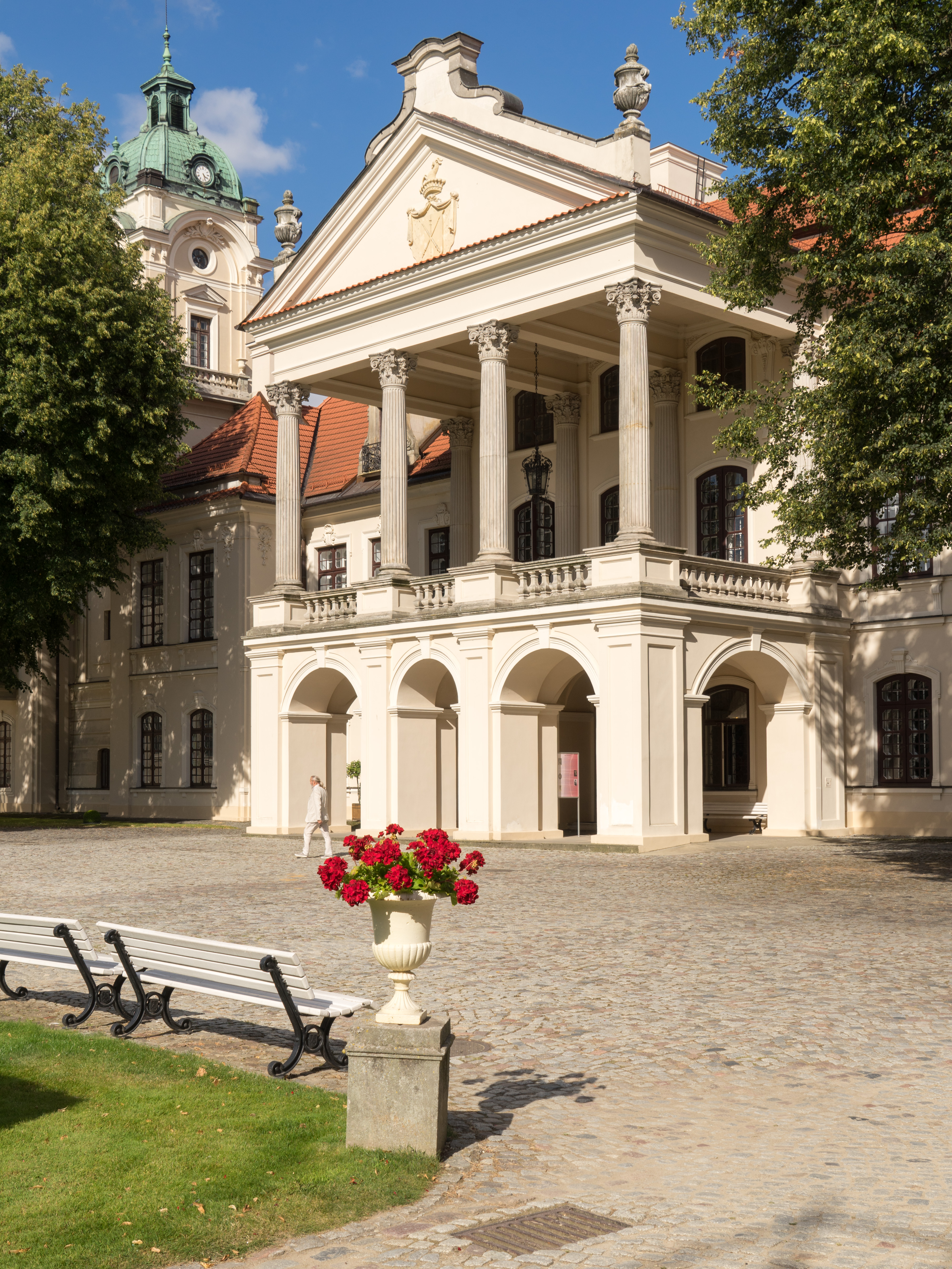
Terrace

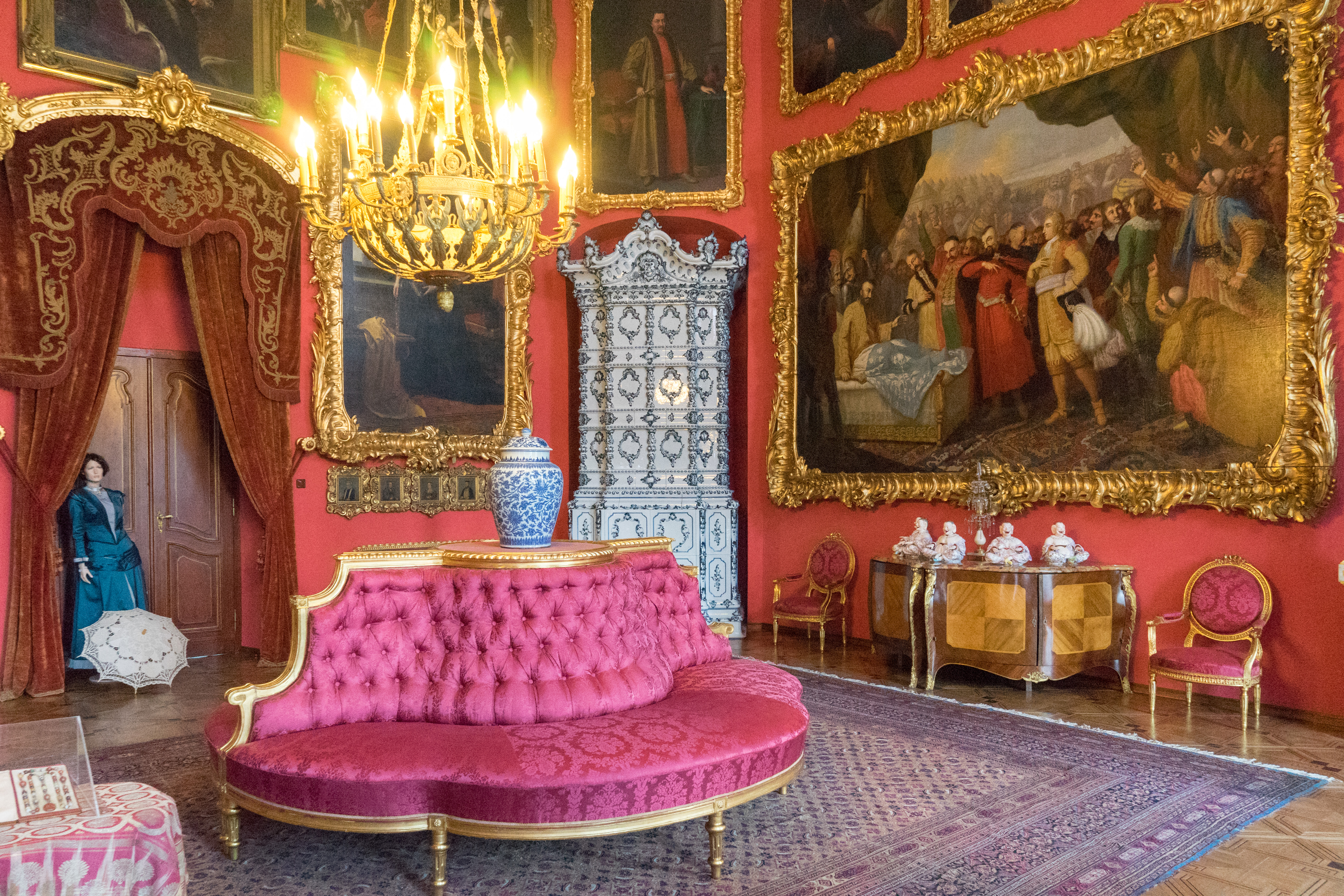
Red living room

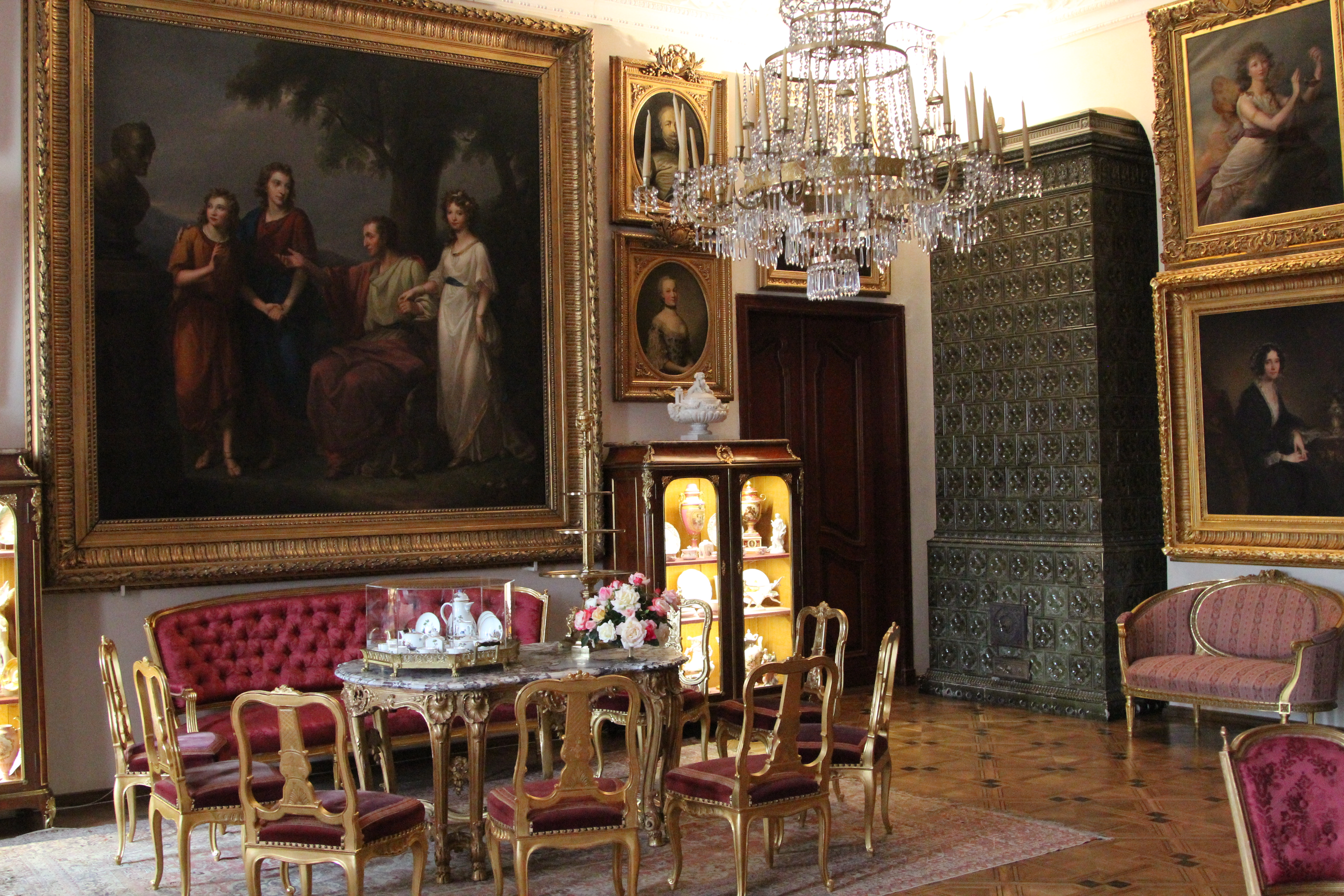
White living room

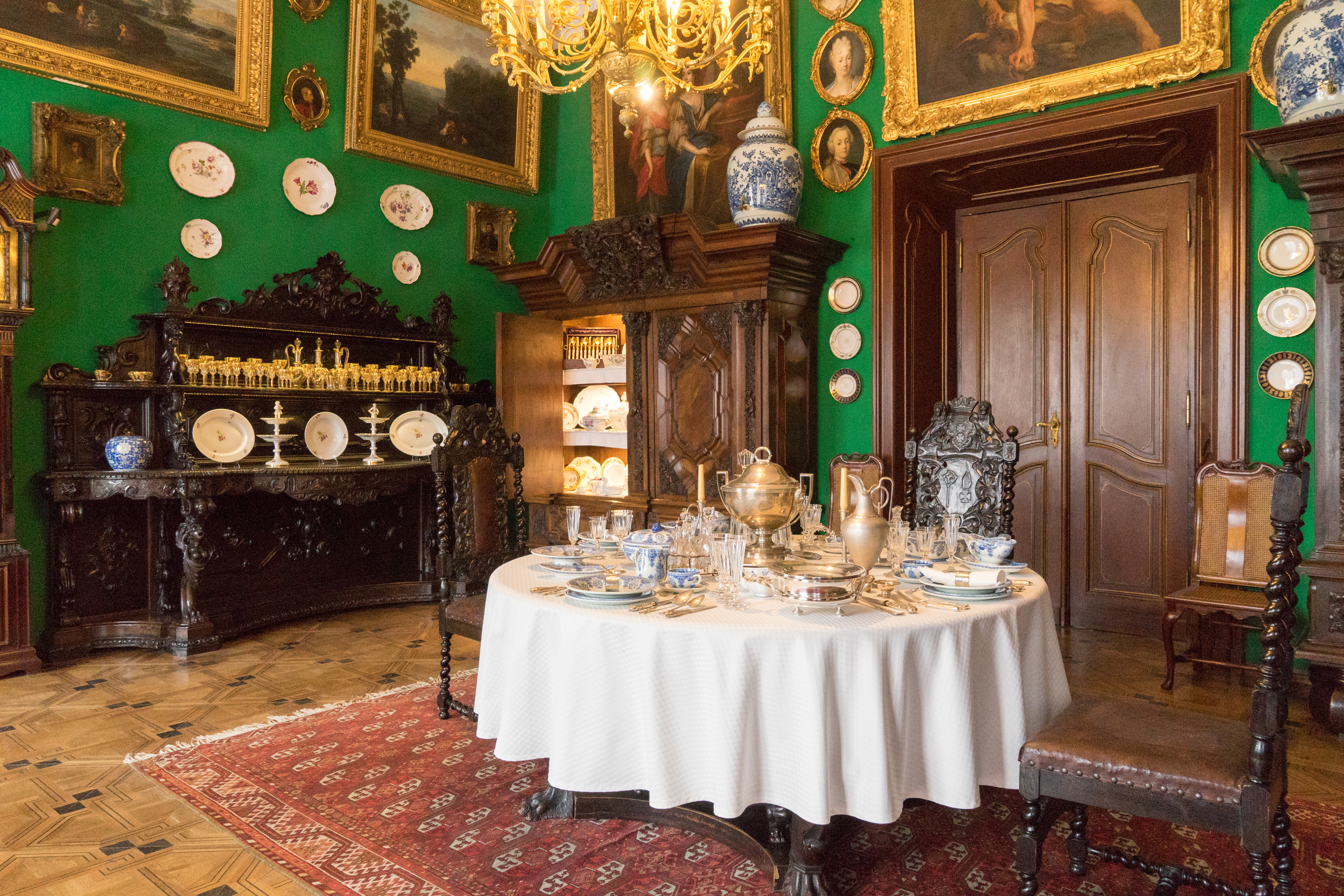
Dining room

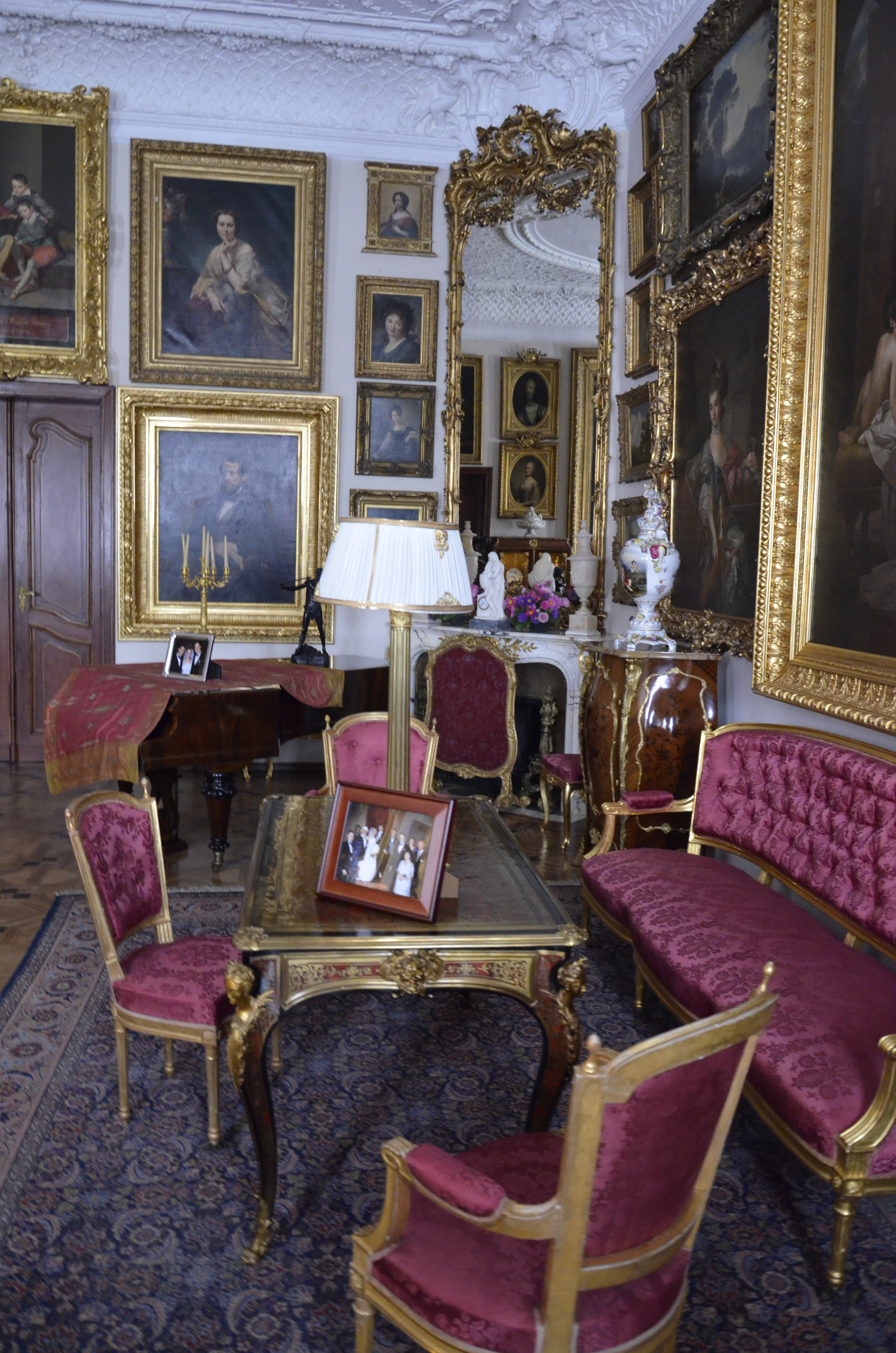
Collection of art in the palace

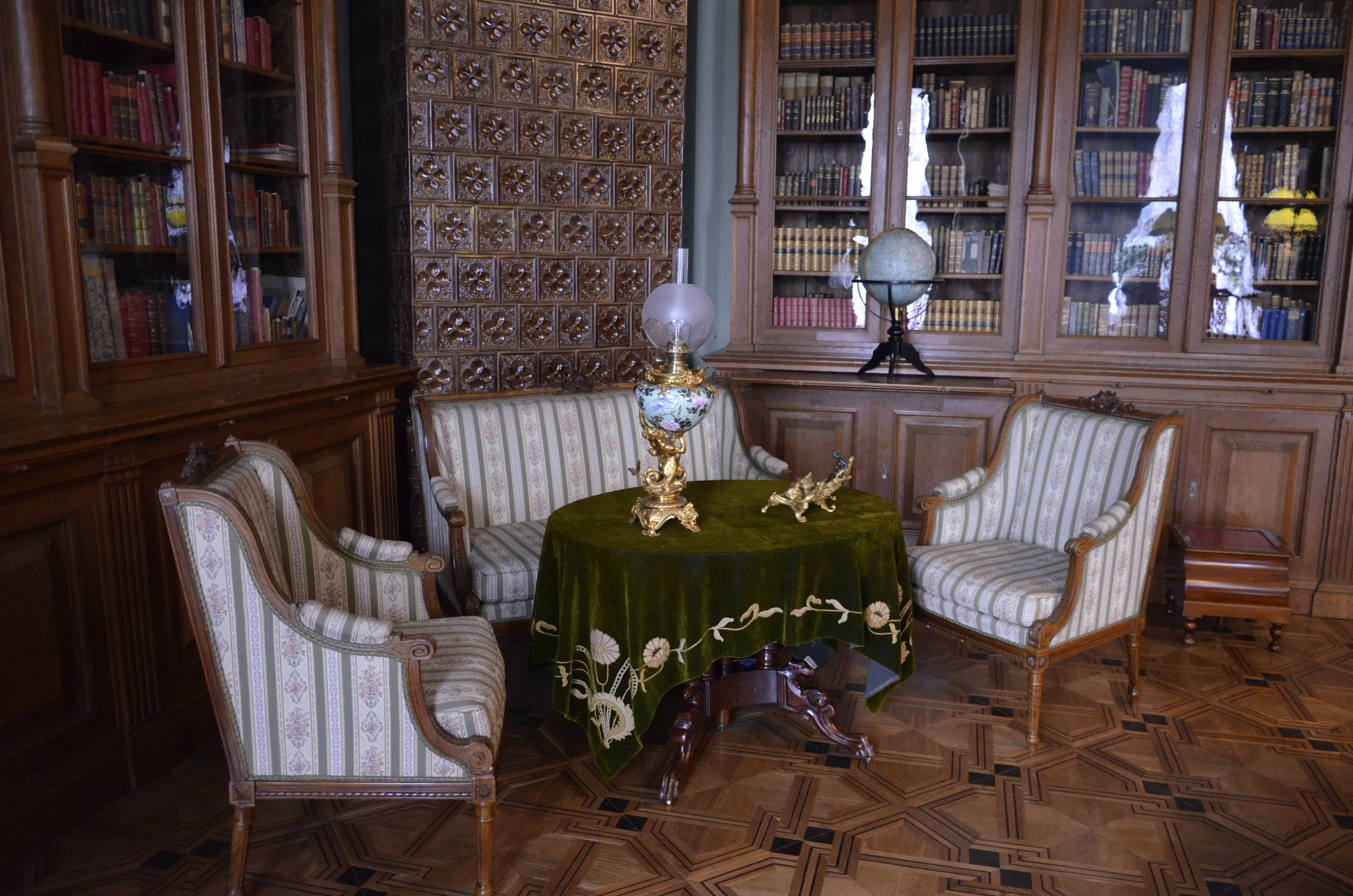
Library

== See also ==
- List of Baroque residences
- List of palaces in Poland
- Neoclassical architecture in Poland
- Architecture of Poland
