= Jewish resistance in German-occupied Europe =

Jewish resistance
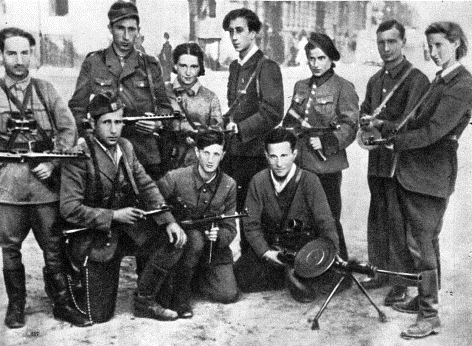
- Members of the United Partisan Organization, active in the Vilna Ghetto during World War II

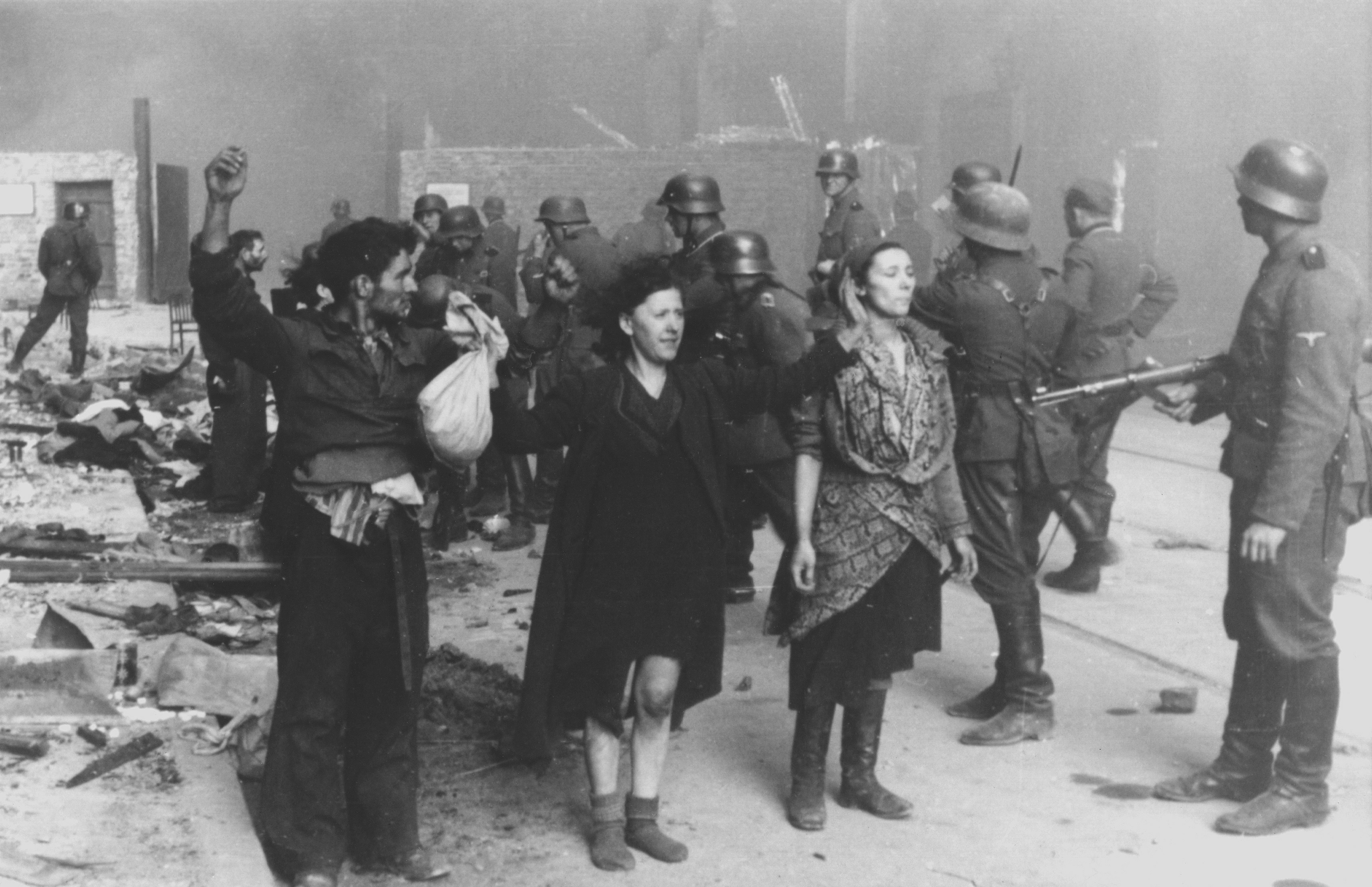
- The Warsaw Ghetto Uprising launched as the final act of defiance against the Holocaust in occupied Poland

Jewish resistance under the Nazi rule
- Organizations: AK; AOB; Bund; FPO; GL; PKB; ŻOB; ŻZW
- Uprisings: Ghetto uprisings; Białystok; Częstochowa; Sobibór; Treblinka; Warsaw

Jewish resistance in German-occupied Europe during World II took many forms, ranging from underground political activities and smuggling networks to armed uprisings in ghettos and camps. Historian Yehuda Bauer has described resistance broadly, including not only armed struggle but also efforts such as maintaining cultural life, documenting Nazi crimes, and helping others survive during the Holocaust.

Due to the overwhelming military power of Nazi Germany and its allies, the system of ghettoization, and the hostility or indifference of various segments of the civilian population, most Jews had limited opportunities for effective military resistance against the Final Solution. Nevertheless, there were numerous instances of resistance, including more than a hundred documented armed uprisings.

== Concepts and definitions ==
The historian Julian T. Jackson argued that Jewish resistance during the German occupation of France took three forms: "first, individual French Jews in the general Resistance; secondly, specifically Jewish organizations in the general Resistance; thirdly, Resistance organizations (not necessarily comprising Jews alone) with specifically Jewish objectives."

In his book The Holocaust: The Jewish Tragedy, Martin Gilbert defines Jewish resistance more broadly. He recounts widespread individual resistance in many forms, emphasizing that Jews fought their oppressors with whatever means were available. Gilbert also highlights the significance of passive resistance, arguing that enduring suffering and even death with dignity was a form of defiance. He writes, "Simply to survive was a victory of the human spirit."

Nechama Tec contends that any act of defiance against the restrictive and dehumanizing conditions imposed on Jews in Europe should be considered spiritual resistance. She asserts that actions such as ghetto leaders scavenging for food and medicine or the preservation of Jewish art and culture through institutions like the Jewish Cultural Association constituted passive resistance. These efforts, Tec argues, countered the Nazi aim to erase Jewish identity and culture. Similarly, Richard Middleton-Kaplan identifies spiritual resistance within concentration camps, including inmates saying prayers for Shabbat, mourning the dead, and making efforts to care for themselves and others.

Bauer similarly argues that resistance encompassed any action that upheld Jewish dignity, not only armed oppositionBauer introduced the concept of "amidah" (Hebrew for "standing up against"), which defines any effort to resist the destruction of Jewish life as an act of defiance.

Bauer also challenges the widely held belief that most Jews went to their deaths passively—"like sheep to the slaughter". He argues that, given the extreme conditions in which Jews in Eastern Europe lived, the surprising reality is not how little resistance occurred, but how much actually took place. Middleton-Kaplan examines the phrase "sheep to the slaughter" in both Jewish and Christian traditions, suggesting that in Jewish scripture, it can symbolize facing existential threats with faith and courage.

In The Myth of Jewish Passivity, Middleton-Kaplan cites Jewish resistance leader Abba Kovner, who famously used the "sheep to the slaughter" phrase in 1941 as a call to action. Kovner repurposed the phrase's original connotation, directing it toward an unresponsive or absent God. Historians such as Patrick Henry argue that the "sheep to the slaughter" narrative persists partly because forms of Jewish resistance beyond armed revolt are often overlooked.

The sociologist Rachel Einwohner argues that Jewish resistance during the Holocaust was constrained by what she termed "cultured" and "structured" ignorance. According to her, the Nazis imposed structured ignorance through misinformation, fear, and dehumanizing isolation in camps and ghettos, while cultured ignorance arose in Jewish communities through kinship values, hope, and reluctance to put fellow detainees in danger. Einwohner contends that organized resistance efforts were more likely to emerge when both forms of ignorance were overcome.

== Types of resistance ==
=== Ghettos across German-occupied Poland ===
In 1940, the Warsaw Ghetto was cut off from access to Polish underground newspapers, and the only newspaper allowed inside the ghetto was the General Government propaganda organization Gazeta Żydowska. As a result, between May 1940 and October 1941, Jews in the ghetto published their own underground newspapers, offering hopeful news about the war and the future. The most prominent of these were published by the Jewish Socialist Party and the Zionist Labor Movement, which formed an alliance. However, these groups had no access to weapons. While these newspapers lamented the destruction caused by the war, they largely did not encourage armed resistance.

Jewish resistance in Eastern and Western Europe took different forms. In Eastern Europe, Jews primarily engaged in unarmed resistance, such as smuggling food, forging documents, or leading escape efforts to forests, as seen in the Sobibór and Treblinka death camps. In contrast, armed resistance was more common in Western Europe.

Between April and May 1943, the Jews of the Warsaw Ghetto launched an armed uprising against the Nazis after it became clear that the remaining inhabitants were being deported to the Treblinka extermination camp. Fighters from the Jewish Combat Organization and the Jewish Military Union resisted with limited weapons, including small arms and Molotov cocktails. The Polish Underground State also provided external support by attacking German forces from outside the ghetto. Despite fierce resistance, the vastly superior German forces eventually suppressed the uprising, killing 13,000 Jews and deporting 56,885 to concentration and extermination camps. The Germans reported 18 dead and 85 wounded, though resistance leader Marek Edelman estimated German casualties to be closer to 300.

Despite these challenges, many other ghetto uprisings took place, though most were ultimately unsuccessful. Major uprisings occurred in ghettos such as Białystok and Częstochowa. In total, uprisings were documented in five major cities and 45 provincial towns.

=== Concentration camps ===
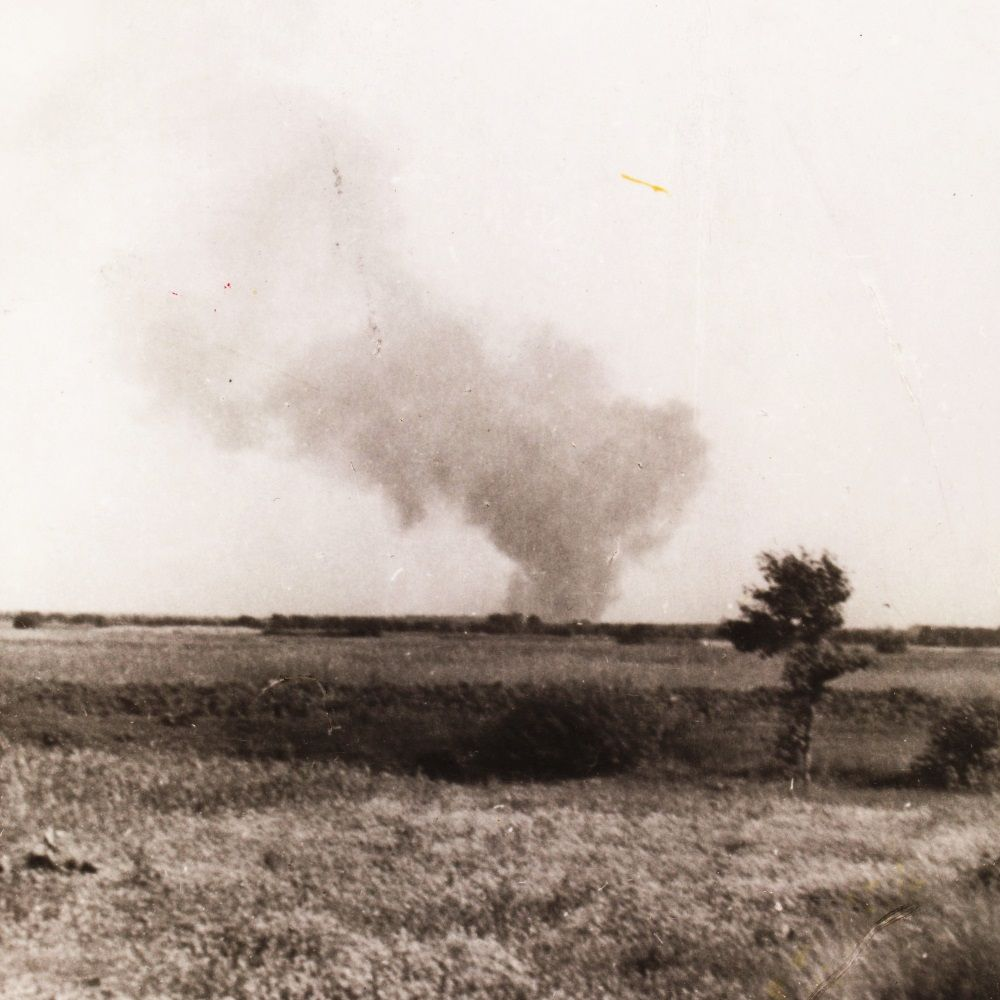
Smoke rising from Treblinka extermination camp during the prisoner uprising of August 1943

Major resistance efforts took place in three extermination camps:

- Treblinka Uprising (August 1943): Prisoners at the Treblinka extermination camp managed to obtain weapons after two young men used forged keys to access the armory. The weapons were secretly distributed in garbage bins. However, before the plan was fully executed, a Nazi guard discovered contraband money on a prisoner. Fearing he would be tortured and reveal the plot, the organizers decided to launch the revolt prematurely. The uprising began with the detonation of a single grenade—the agreed-upon signal. Prisoners then attacked Nazi guards with firearms and explosives, killing several German and Ukrainian personnel. They set fire to fuel tanks, barracks, and warehouses, disabled military vehicles, and threw grenades at the SS headquarters. The guards retaliated with machine-gun fire, killing approximately 1,500 inmates. Despite the chaos, around 70 prisoners managed to escape, some engaging in firefights with pursuing guards. The uprising disrupted gassing operations at the camp for a month.
- Sobibór Uprising (October 1943): Led by Polish-Jewish prisoner Leon Felhendler and Soviet-Jewish POW Alexander Pechersky, inmates at the Sobibór extermination camp covertly assassinated 12 German SS officers, including the deputy commander, along with several Ukrainian guards. The original plan was to eliminate all SS personnel and walk out of the camp through the main gate. However, the discovery of one of the killings forced the inmates to act sooner than planned. Under heavy gunfire, approximately 300 of the 600 prisoners in the camp attempted to escape. Many were killed in surrounding minefields or recaptured, but around 50–70 inmates successfully evaded capture. The uprising led the Nazis to shut down Sobibór entirely.
- Auschwitz Uprising (October 7, 1944): The Jewish Sonderkommando—prisoners forced to work in the gas chambers and crematoria—staged an uprising at Auschwitz-Birkenau. Female inmates had secretly smuggled in explosives from a weapons factory, which were used to partially destroy Crematorium IV. Members of the Kommando unit overpowered their guards and attempted a mass breakout. Three SS guards were killed, including an Oberkapo who was thrown alive into a cremation oven. However, the escape attempt was crushed by heavy gunfire, and almost all of the 250 escapees were killed. There were also broader plans for a general uprising at Auschwitz, which would have been coordinated with an Allied airstrike and a Polish resistance attack from outside the camp, though this never materialized.

In addition to these major uprisings, revolts also took place in at least 18 forced labor camps.

=== Partisan groups ===
Jewish partisan groups operated in many countries, particularly in Poland. Many Jews also joined existing partisan movements. The most notable Jewish partisan groups included the Bielski partisans, who were portrayed in the film Defiance, and the Parczew partisans, who operated in the forests near Lublin. Hundreds of Jews escaped from ghettos and joined partisan resistance groups. Small Jewish partisan units, such as those formed by residents of the Kovno Ghetto, acquired weapons and established contact with Soviet partisan groups, while others fled to join units like the Bielski partisans, which sheltered hundreds of Jews in forest encampments.

Some Jews liberated from the Gęsiówka concentration camp later participated in the 1944 Warsaw Uprising. In France, up to 20% of the French Resistance was Jewish, despite Jews making up only about 1% of the French population. A notable Jewish resistance unit in France was the Armée Juive.

Approximately 10% of Soviet partisans were Jewish. Thousands of Jews also joined the Yugoslav Partisans. One Yugoslav partisan unit, the Rab battalion, was composed entirely of Jews who had been liberated from the Rab concentration camp.

== Jewish resistance in German-occupied Europe by country ==
=== Belgium ===
Resistance to the persecution of Jews in Belgium intensified between August and September 1942, following the introduction of legislation mandating the wearing of yellow badges and the commencement of deportations. When deportations began, Jewish partisans destroyed records of Jews compiled by the AJB (Association des Juifs en Belgique).

The first organization specifically dedicated to hiding Jews, the Comité de Défense des Juifs (CDJ-JVD), was established in the summer of 1942. This left-wing organization is estimated to have saved up to 4,000 children and 10,000 adults by securing safe hiding places for them. The CDJ also published two underground newspapers in Yiddish: Unzer Wort ("Our Word"), which had a Labour-Zionist stance, and Unzer Kamf ("Our Fight"), which had a Communist perspective.

The CDJ was just one of many organized resistance groups that aided Jews in hiding. Other groups and individual resistance members were responsible for securing hiding places, providing food, and forging identity documents. Many Jews who had gone into hiding later joined organized resistance movements. Left-wing groups, such as the Front de l'Indépendance (FI-OF), were particularly popular among Belgian Jews. The Communist-affiliated Partisans Armés (PA) had a significant Jewish section in Brussels.

The Belgian resistance carried out the assassination of Robert Holzinger, the head of the deportation program, in 1942. Holzinger, an Austrian Jew who collaborated with the Germans, had been appointed by the occupiers to oversee deportations. Following his assassination, the leadership of the AJB was reorganized. Five Jewish leaders, including the head of the AJB, were arrested and interned in Breendonk but were later released after public outcry. However, a sixth leader was deported directly to Auschwitz.

The Belgian resistance was notably well-informed about the fate of deported Jews. In August 1942—just two months after deportations began—an underground newspaper, De Vrijschutter, reported: "They [the deported Jews] are being killed in groups by gas, and others are killed by salvos of machinegun fire."

In early 1943, the Front de l'Indépendance sent Victor Martin, an economist at the Catholic University of Louvain, to gather intelligence on the fate of deported Belgian Jews. Using the cover of his research position at the University of Cologne, Martin traveled to Auschwitz and witnessed the crematoria. He was later arrested by the Germans but managed to escape and reported his findings to the CDJ in May 1943.

=== France ===
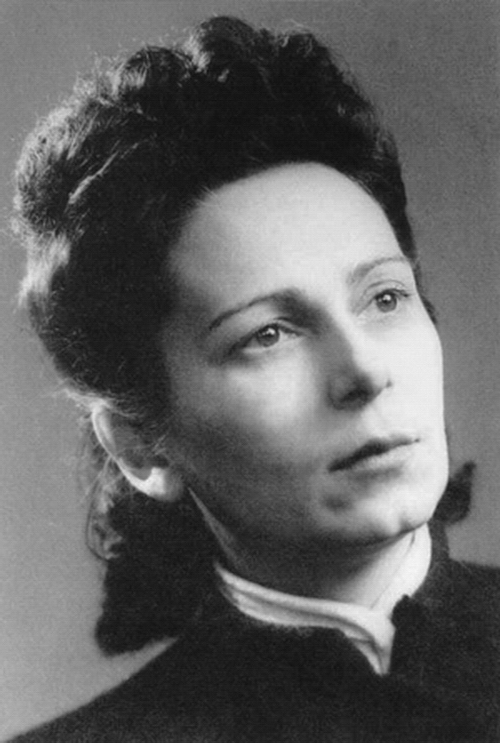
Ariadna Scriabina, co-founder of the Armée Juive

Although Jews made up only about 1% of the French population, they accounted for approximately 15–20% of the French Resistance. Many Jewish resistance members were refugees from Germany, Poland, and other Central European countries.

While the majority of French and foreign Jews involved in the French Resistance joined general Resistance movements, some also established their own armed resistance organization: the Armée Juive ("Jewish Army"), a Zionist group that grew to approximately 2,000 fighters at its peak. Operating throughout France, the Armée Juive smuggled hundreds of Jews to Spain and Switzerland, carried out attacks against German occupation forces, and targeted Nazi informants and Gestapo agents. The group actively participated in the general French uprising of August 1944, fighting in Paris, Lyon, and Toulouse.

=== Germany ===
Jewish resistance within Germany included sabotage, intelligence-gathering for Allied forces, distributing anti-Nazi propaganda, and helping Jews emigrate. Jewish participation in the German resistance was largely confined to the underground activities of left-wing Zionist groups such as Werkleute, Hashomer Hatzair, and Habonim, as well as the German Social Democrats, Communists, and independent left-wing groups such as New Beginning. While much of the non-left-wing and non-Jewish opposition to Hitler in Germany (e.g., conservative and religious forces) opposed Nazi plans for the extermination of European Jewry, these groups often still harbored anti-Jewish sentiments themselves.

One notable case involved the arrest and execution of Helmut Hirsch, a Jewish architectural student from Stuttgart, in connection with a plot to bomb the Nazi Party headquarters in Nuremberg. Hirsch became involved with the Black Front, a breakaway faction from the Nazi Party led by Otto Strasser. After being captured by the Gestapo in December 1936, Hirsch confessed to planning to murder Julius Streicher, a leading Nazi official and editor of the virulently anti-Semitic newspaper Der Stürmer, on behalf of Strasser and the Black Front. Hirsch was sentenced to death on March 8, 1937, and executed by guillotine on June 4.

Perhaps the most significant Jewish resistance group within Germany, for which records survive, was the Berlin-based Baum Group (Baum-Gruppe), active from 1937 to 1942. Largely composed of young Jewish men and women, the group disseminated anti-Nazi leaflets and organized semi-public demonstrations. Its most notable action was the bombing of an anti-Soviet exhibit organized by Joseph Goebbels in Berlin's Lustgarten. The bombing led to mass arrests, executions, and reprisals against German Jews. The reprisals it provoked sparked debates within opposition circles, similar to those in other resistance movements—whether to take action and risk murderous reprisals or remain non-confrontational in hopes of maximizing survival.

=== Netherlands ===
In the Netherlands, the only pre-war group that immediately began resistance against the German occupation was the Communist Party. During the first two years of the war, it was by far the largest resistance organization, much larger than all other organizations combined. A major act of resistance was the organization of the February strike in 1941, in protest against anti-Jewish measures. Many Jews participated in this resistance. About 1,000 Dutch Jews took part in resisting the Germans, and of those, 500 perished in the process. In 1988, a monument to their memory was unveiled by the then mayor of Amsterdam, Ed van Thijn.

Among the first Jewish resisters was German fugitive Ernst Cahn, owner of an ice cream parlor. Together with his partner, Kohn, he had an ammonia gas cylinder installed in the parlor to defend against attacks from the militant arm of the fascist NSB, the so-called "Weerafdeling" (WA). One day in February 1941, the German police forced their way into the parlor and were gassed. Cahn was eventually captured and, on March 3, 1941, became the first civilian to be executed by a Nazi firing squad in the Netherlands.

Benny Bluhm, a boxer, organized Jewish fighting groups composed of members from his boxing school to resist attacks. One of these brawls led to the death of a WA member, H. Koot, which prompted the Germans to order the first Dutch razzia (police raid) of Jews as a reprisal. This, in turn, led to the February Strike. Bluhm's group was the only Jewish group actively resisting the Germans in the Netherlands and the first group of resistance fighters in the country. Bluhm survived the war and later advocated for a monument for Jewish resisters, which was unveiled two years after his death in 1986.

Numerous Jews also participated in resisting the Germans. Walter Süskind, the Jewish director of the assembly center in the "Hollandsche Schouwburg" (a former theater), played a key role in smuggling children out of the center. He was aided by his assistant Jacques van de Kar and the director of the nearby crèche, Mrs. Pimentel.

Within the underground Communist Party, a militant group called the Nederlandse Volksmilitie (NVM, Dutch People's Militia) was formed. The leader, Sally (Samuel) Dormits, had military experience from guerrilla warfare in Brazil and participation in the Spanish Civil War. This organization was formed in The Hague but was primarily based in Rotterdam. It consisted of about 200 mainly Jewish participants. They carried out several bomb attacks on German troop trains and arson attacks on cinemas, which were restricted for Jews. Dormits was caught after stealing a handbag from a woman to obtain an identification card for his Jewish girlfriend, who also participated in the resistance. Dormits committed suicide in a police station by shooting himself in the head. A shop's cash ticket led the police to discover Dormits's hiding place, where they found bombs, arson materials, illegal documents, reports on resistance actions, and a list of participants. The Gestapo was immediately notified, and that day, 200 people were arrested, followed by many more individuals connected to the group in Rotterdam, The Hague, and Amsterdam. Dutch police participated in torturing the Jewish communists. After a trial, more than 20 were executed by firing squad; most of the others died in concentration camps or were gassed in Auschwitz. Only a few survived.

== Jewish service in Allied militaries ==
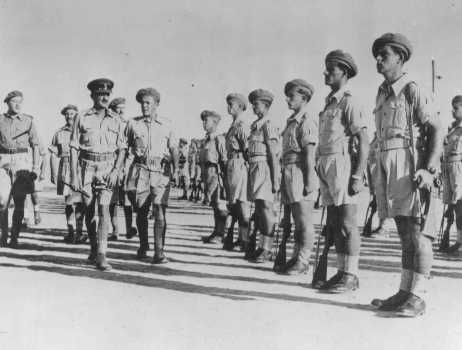
Soldiers of the Jewish Brigade being inspected by the brigade's commander in October 1944

Approximately 1.5 million Jews served in the regular Allied militaries during World War II, though some served in the Pacific Theater of the war instead of seeing action against the Germans. About 550,000 Jews served in the United States Armed Forces and 500,000 in the Red Army. Another 100,000 served in the Polish Army during the German invasion. After the fall of Poland, many served in the Polish forces in exile. Jews served in the Polish Armed Forces in the West. In one instance, about 4,000 Jews joined Anders' Army. When it stopped in Mandatory Palestine, about 3,000 deserted to remain in Palestine, with the remaining 1,000 remaining with Anders' Army to fight in the Italian campaign. Other Jews served in the Polish Armed Forces in the East, with the 1st Tadeusz Kościuszko Infantry Division in particular having many Jewish soldiers, comprising perhaps 20% of the force in early 1944. In total, about 200,000 Jews served in various Polish formations during the war. About 65,000 British Jews and Jewish refugees who had settled in Britain and 30,000 Jews from Mandatory Palestine served in the British Armed Forces during the war. At least 60,000 Jews were serving in the French Armed Forces in January 1940, including 30,000 French Jews and another 30,000 foreign Jews serving in the Foreign Legion and other units. Jewish soldiers fought in the Battle of France, and after the German occupation many Jews fought with the Free French Forces, with researchers estimating that up to one-tenth of Free French soldiers may have been Jewish. Around 17,000 Jews served in the Canadian Armed Forces during the war. A total of 12,898 Jews served in the Greek Armed Forces. Some 10,000 South African Jews served in the Union Defence Force. Another 3,870 Jews served in the Australian Armed Forces. In addition, an estimated 3,000 Jews served in the British Indian Army.

Some Red Army units were largely Jewish. The 16th Rifle Division, which was officially a Lithuanian unit, is estimated by various sources to have been 50%, to 80% or even 85% Jewish. Initially, about 45% to 50% of the division was Jewish, with the Jews making up the absolute majority in the infantry regiments. By the time the division reached Lithuania, it was only about 20% Jewish. The 201st Rifle Division was estimated at being 17% Jewish.

The British Army trained 37 Jewish volunteers from Mandatory Palestine to parachute into Europe in an attempt to organize resistance. The most famous member of this group was Hannah Szenes. She was parachuted into Yugoslavia to assist in the rescue of Hungarian Jews who were about to be deported to the German death camp at Auschwitz. Szenes was arrested at the Hungarian border, then imprisoned and tortured, but she refused to reveal details of her mission. She was eventually tried and executed by firing squad. She is regarded as a national heroine in Israel.

No. 51 Commando, a British Army commando unit composed of Jewish and Arab volunteers from Palestine, fought in the East African campaign.

In 1941, the Haganah, the main Jewish militia in Mandatory Palestine, formed the Palmach, an elite strike force, in order to defend against a possible German invasion. It cooperated with the British and received sabotage training from them. After a failed sabotage mission (Operation Boatswain), it fought alongside British Commonwealth forces in the Syria-Lebanon campaign.

In July 1944, the Jewish Brigade, a brigade group of the British Army for Jews from Palestine, was established. It consisted of about 5,000 Jewish volunteers primarily from Palestine as well as British Jewish and non-Jewish soldiers in certain roles. It was led primarily by British-Jewish officers. The brigade was organized into three infantry regiments, an artillery regiment, and supporting units. It was attached to the British Eighth Army in Italy from November 1944 and went into action in March 1945. The brigade took part in the Spring 1945 offensive in Italy. After the end of the war in Europe, the Jewish Brigade was moved to Belgium and the Netherlands in July 1945. As well as participating in combat operations against German forces, members of the brigade assisted and protected Holocaust survivors and clandestinely hunted and killed Nazi war criminals following the end of the war in Europe.

The Special Interrogation Group was a British Army commando unit comprising German-speaking Jewish volunteers from Palestine. It carried out commando and sabotage raids behind Axis lines during the Western Desert Campaign and gathered military intelligence by stopping and questioning German transports while dressed as German military police. They also assisted other British forces. Following the disastrous failure of Operation Agreement, a series of ground and amphibious operations carried out by British, Rhodesian, and New Zealand forces on German and Italian-held Tobruk in September 1942, the survivors were transferred to the Royal Pioneer Corps.

== Notable Jewish resistance fighters ==
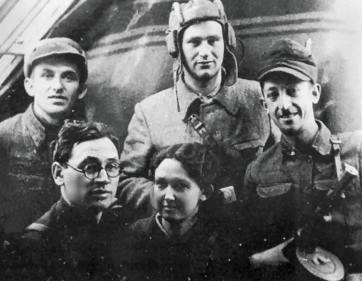
A Jewish partisan group of the brigade named after Valery Chkalov. Belorussia, 1943

- Mordechaj Anielewicz, leader of the Jewish Combat Organization during the Warsaw Ghetto Uprising, killed in action in 1943
- Paweł Frenkiel, a Polish Jewish youth leader in Warsaw and a senior commander of the Jewish Military Union, killed in action defending the JMU headquarters
- Yitzhak Arad, a former Soviet partisan
- Herbert Baum, a Jewish member of the German resistance against National Socialism, tortured to death by the Gestapo
- Bielski partisans, an organization of Jewish partisans who rescued Jews from extermination in western Belarus
- Frank Blaichman, a Holocaust survivor who was a Polish-Jewish leader of Jewish resistance
- Thomas Blatt, a survivor from the uprising and escape from the Sobibór extermination camp in October 1943
- Masha Bruskina, a 17-year-old Jewish member of the Minsk Resistance, executed by the Nazis
- Eugenio Calò, an Italian partisan, executed by the Nazis
- Franco Cesana, an Italian Jew who joined a partisan group, killed by the Nazis at age 13
- Icchak Cukierman, one of the leaders of the Warsaw Ghetto Uprising 1943 and fighter in the 1944 Warsaw Uprising
- Szymon Datner helped smuggle several people out of Białystok Ghetto in 1943
- Marek Edelman, a leader of the Warsaw Ghetto Uprising
- Mordechai Schlein, a 12-year old partisan and violinist who blew a restaurant with many German officers, died at 14 in a German bombardment.
- Selma Engel-Wijnberg, the only known Dutch prisoner of Sobibór extermination camp who escaped and survived
- Leon Feldhendler, a Polish-Jewish resistance fighter who organized the 1943 prisoner uprising at the Sobibór extermination camp
- Dov Freiberg, a participant in the Sobibór uprising who joined Joseph Serchuk's partisan unit
- Munyo Gruber, a member of the Parczew partisans who fought the Germans while attempting to save as many Jewish lives as possible
- Abba Kovner, a member of the United Partisan Organization, one of the first armed underground organizations in the Jewish ghettos under Nazi occupation
- Zivia Lubetkin, one of the leaders of the Jewish underground in Nazi-occupied Warsaw and the only woman on the High Command of the resistance group Żydowska Organizacja Bojowa
- Dov Lopatyn, leader of one of the first ghetto uprisings of the war and member of a partisan unit, killed in action
- Vladka Meed, a member of Jewish resistance in Poland who smuggled dynamite into the Warsaw Ghetto and also helped children escape out of the ghetto
- Parczew partisans, fighters in irregular military groups participating in the Jewish resistance movement
- Alexander Pechersky, one of the organizers, and the leader of the most successful uprising and mass-escape of Jews from a Nazi extermination camp during World War II; which occurred at the Sobibor extermination camp in 1943
- Frumka Płotnicka, leader of the Sosnowiec and Będzin Ghetto uprisings.
- Moše Pijade, one of the leaders of the uprising in Montenegro against the Italian occupation forces in Axis-occupied Yugoslavia
- Haviva Reik, one of 32 or 33 Palestinian Jewish parachutists sent by the Jewish Agency and Britain's Special Operations Executive (SOE) on military missions in Nazi-occupied Europe; she was captured and executed
- Joseph Serchuk, commander of the Jewish partisan unit in the Lublin area in Poland
- Hannah Szenes, one of 37 Jews from Mandatory Palestine parachuted by the British Army into Yugoslavia, she was captured, tortured, and executed by the Nazis
- Charles Thau, a Polish Jew resistance fighter for 19 months in Carpathian Forest, conscripted by Red Army combatants and appears in iconic WW 2 photo of Red Army meeting US forces at Elbe Day in 1945.
- Lelio Vittorio Valobra, leader of DELASEM, which helped Jewish refugees to escape the Holocaust
- Dawid Wdowiński, founder of the ŻZW group in the Warsaw Ghetto who served as its political leader
- Yitzhak Wittenberg, a Jewish resistance fighter in Vilnius; after he was captured by the Gestapo, he committed suicide in his jail cell
- Shalom Yoran, a Jewish resistance fighter who fought back the Germans and their collaborators
- Simcha Zorin, a Jewish Soviet partisan commander in Minsk of a group that consisted of 800 Jewish fighters

== Aftermath ==
=== The Nokmim ===
In the aftermath of World War II, Holocaust survivors, many of them former members of Jewish resistance groups, banded together to form a group known as Nokmim (Hebrew for "avengers"). They tracked down and executed former Nazis who had been involved in the Holocaust. The number of Nazis killed by the Nokmim remains unknown, and their efforts are believed to have continued into the 1950s. The targets were often kidnapped and killed by hanging or strangulation; others were murdered in hit-and-run attacks. A former high-ranking Gestapo officer died after kerosene was injected into his bloodstream while he was in the hospital awaiting an operation. Some of the most successful Nokmim may have been veterans of the Jewish Brigade, who had access to military intelligence, transportation, and the ability to freely travel across Europe.

The Nokmim also traveled to locations such as Latin America, Canada, and Spain to track down and kill Nazis who had settled there. In one instance, they are believed to have confronted Aleksander Laak, who was responsible for the deaths of 8,500 Jews at Jägala concentration camp, at his suburban home in Winnipeg. After informing him of their intent to kill him, they allowed him to commit suicide.

In 1946, the Nokmim carried out a mass poisoning attack against former SS members imprisoned at Stalag 13, lacing their bread rations with arsenic at the bakery that supplied it. Approximately 1,200 prisoners fell ill, but no deaths were reported. The U.S. Army mustered its medical resources to treat the poisoned prisoners. Responses among the Nokmim ranged from viewing this mass assassination attempt as a failure to claiming that the Allies covered up the fact that there had been deaths.

== See also ==
- Armenian resistance during the Armenian Genocide
- Righteous Among the Nations
- Jewish Resistance Against the Nazis (book)
- Anti-fascism
- Defiance (2008 film)
- Uprising (2001 film)
- Like sheep to the slaughter
- Jewish military personnel of World War II
- Resistance during World War II
