= Stanisławów Duży =

- Village
- Location within Poland
- Coordinates: 51°28′N 22°23′E
- Country: Poland
- Voivodeship: Lublin
- County: Lubartów
- Gmina: Kamionka

Stanisławów Duży [staniˈswavuf ˈduʐɨ] is a village in the administrative district of Gmina Kamionka, within Lubartów County, Lublin Voivodeship, in eastern Poland.
