= Ciemno, Lublin Voivodeship =

Ciemno
- Village
- Location within Poland
- Coordinates: 51°30′N 22°27′E
- Country: Poland
- Voivodeship: Lublin
- County: Lubartów
- Gmina: Kamionka

Ciemno [ˈt͡ɕɛmnɔ] is a village in the administrative district of Gmina Kamionka, within Lubartów County, Lublin Voivodeship, in eastern Poland.
