= Jewish military personnel of World War II =

During World War II, Jews have served in militaries of numerous nations, including on both Allied and Axis side.

== Allied side ==
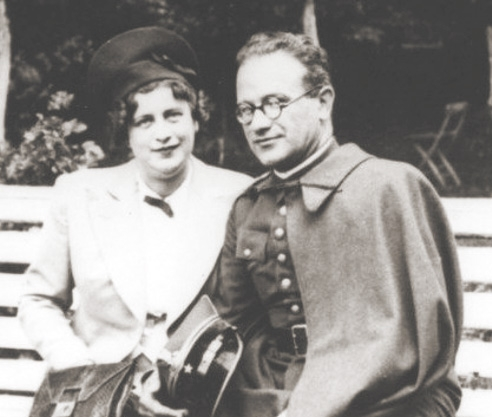
Baruch Steinberg, Chief Rabbi of the Polish Army in the Second Polish Republic

Approximately 1.5 million Jews fought in the regular Allied armies. Out of that number, approximately:

- 550,000 Jews served in the US Army
- 500,000 Jews served in the Soviet Red Army
- 200,000 Jews served in various Polish formations
- 30,000 Jews served in the British Army (including in formations like the Jewish Brigade)
- 10,000-15,000 Jews served in the French Army

== Axis side ==
150,000 people of Jewish ancestry (Mischlinge) served in the Nazi Germany Wehrmacht and related forces.

== See also ==
- Jewish military history
- Jewish resistance in World War II
