= Jewish Resistance Against the Nazis (book) =

- Author: Patrick Henry
- Publisher: Catholic University of America Press
- Publication date: 2014

Jewish Resistance Against the Nazis (2014) is a collection of essays edited by Patrick Henry and published by Catholic University of America Press. Discussing Jewish resistance in German-occupied Europe, the book argues that Jews resisted Nazi rule in a variety of ways. Contributors include Yehuda Bauer and Nechama Tec. It received positive reviews.
