= Kozłówka Landscape Park =

Protected area in Poland

Coordinates: 51.40841°N 22.56832°E

- Kozłowiecki Park Krajobrazowy
- IUCN category V (protected landscape/seascape)
- Interactive map of Kozłówka Landscape Park
- Location: Lublin Voivodeship
- Area: 40.18 km^{2} (15.51 sq mi)
- Established: 1990

Kozłówka Landscape Park (Kozłowiecki Park Krajobrazowy) is a protected area (Landscape Park) situated in south-eastern Poland, in Lubartów County, Lublin Voivodeship.

It covers an area of 40.18 square kilometres (15.51 sq mi), of which about 90% is covered by the Kozłówka (Kozłowiecki) forest. The park's highest altitude is 200 metres (660 ft). It takes its name from the village of Kozłówka.

== See also ==
- List of landscape parks of Poland
- Kozie Góry
- Kozłówka, Lublin Voivodeship
