= Kozłowiecki forest =

Forest in Lubartów County, Poland

Kozłowiecki forest Polish: Lasy Kozłowieckie
- Location within Poland
- Interactive map of Kozłowiecki forest

Geography
- Location: Lubartów County, Lublin Voivodeship, Poland
- Coordinates: 51°24′N 22°32′E

Kozłowiecki forest is a forest located in the Lubartów County, Lublin Voivodeship in Poland, south of the town of Lubartów. It forms part of the Kozłowiecki Landscape Park.
