= Wólka Krasienińska =

- Village
- Location within Poland
- Coordinates: 51°25′N 22°29′E
- Country: Poland
- Voivodeship: Lublin
- County: Lubartów
- Gmina: Kamionka

Wólka Krasienińska (Polish pronunciation: [ˈvulka kraɕɛˈɲij̃ska]) is a village in the administrative district of Gmina Kamionka, within Lubartów County, Lublin Voivodeship, in eastern Poland.
