= Samoklęski-Kolonia =

- Village
- Location within Poland
- Coordinates: 51°27′28″N 22°25′16″E
- Country: Poland
- Voivodeship: Lublin
- County: Lubartów
- Gmina: Kamionka

Samoklęski-Kolonia [samɔˈklɛ̃ski kɔˈlɔɲa] is a village in the administrative district of Gmina Kamionka, within Lubartów County, Lublin Voivodeship, in eastern Poland.
