= Bronze Medal of Military Valor =

Bronze Medal of Military Valor Medaglia di bronzo al valor militare
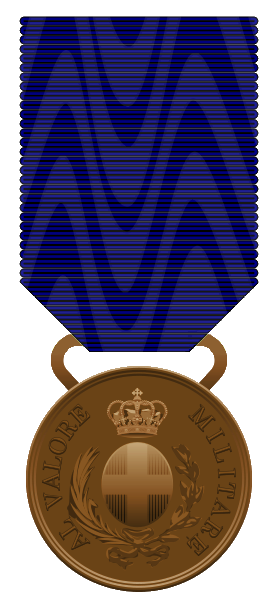
- Bronze Medal of Military Valor (Royal version & Republican version)
- Type: Military decoration
- Awarded for: Deeds of outstanding gallantry in war
- Country: Italy
- Eligibility: Junior officers and soldiers
- Established: 26 March 1833
- Ribbon bar of the medal

Precedence
- Next (higher): Silver Medal of Military Valor
- Next (lower): Bronze Medal of Army Valor

The Bronze Medal of Military Valor (Italian: Medaglia di bronzo al valor militare) is an Italian medal for gallantry.

It was established by Charles Albert of Sardinia on 26 March 1833, along with the higher ranking Gold Medal of Military Valor and Silver Medal of Military Valor, which were established by King Victor Amadeus III on 21 May 1793.

These medals, as well as the "Croce di Guerra al Valor Militare" (War Cross of Military Valor - which can only be awarded in time of war) are established by the Royal Decree of 4 November 1932, in which their purpose is defined as "To distinguish and publicly honor the authors of heroic military acts, even ones performed in time of peace, provided that the exploit is closely connected with the purposes for which the Armed Forces are constituted, whatever may be the condition or quality of the author."

During the First World War, the medal was given out some 60,244 times for individual acts of heroism (compared to 38,614 Silver medals and 368 Gold Medals).

== Notable recipients ==
- Ernesto Burzagli
- William W. Eagles
- Maurizio Giglio
- Hans-Werner Kraus
- Arthur Scott
- Pedro del Valle
- Sebastiano Visconti Prasca (twice)
- Franco Cesana
- Gabriele D'Annunzio
- Antonio Cieri
- Emilio Lussu (twice)

== See also ==
- Medal of Military Valor
- Gold Medal of Military Valor
- Silver Medal of Military Valor
- List of military decorations
- Italian medals 1860-today (Italian Wikipedia)
