= Bratnik =

- Village
- Location within Poland
- Coordinates: 51°26′22″N 22°28′11″E
- Country: Poland
- Voivodeship: Lublin
- County: Lubartów
- Gmina: Kamionka
- Population: 99

Bratnik [ˈbratnik] is a village in the administrative district of Gmina Kamionka, within Lubartów County, Lublin Voivodeship, in eastern Poland.
