= Kierzkówka-Kolonia =

- Village
- Location within Poland
- Coordinates: 51°28′53″N 22°25′33″E
- Country: Poland
- Voivodeship: Lublin
- County: Lubartów
- Gmina: Kamionka
- Population: 130

Kierzkówka-Kolonia [kʲɛʂˈkufka kɔˈlɔɲa] is a village in the administrative district of Gmina Kamionka, within Lubartów County, Lublin Voivodeship, in eastern Poland.
