= Rudka Gołębska =

- Village
- Location within Poland
- Coordinates: 51°28′N 22°25′E
- Country: Poland
- Voivodeship: Lublin
- County: Lubartów
- Gmina: Kamionka

Rudka Gołębska [ˈrutka ɡɔˈwɛmpska] is a village in the administrative district of Gmina Kamionka, within Lubartów County, Lublin Voivodeship, in eastern Poland.
