= Syry =

- Village
- Location within Poland
- Coordinates: 51°26′N 22°24′E
- Country: Poland
- Voivodeship: Lublin
- County: Lubartów
- Gmina: Kamionka
- Elevation: 168 m (551 ft)
- Population: 14,039
- Area code: (+48) 81
- Vehicle registration: LLB

Syry [ˈsɨrɨ] is a village in the administrative district of Gmina Kamionka, within Lubartów County, Lublin Voivodeship, in eastern Poland.
