= Samoklęski, Lublin Voivodeship =

Samoklęski
- Village
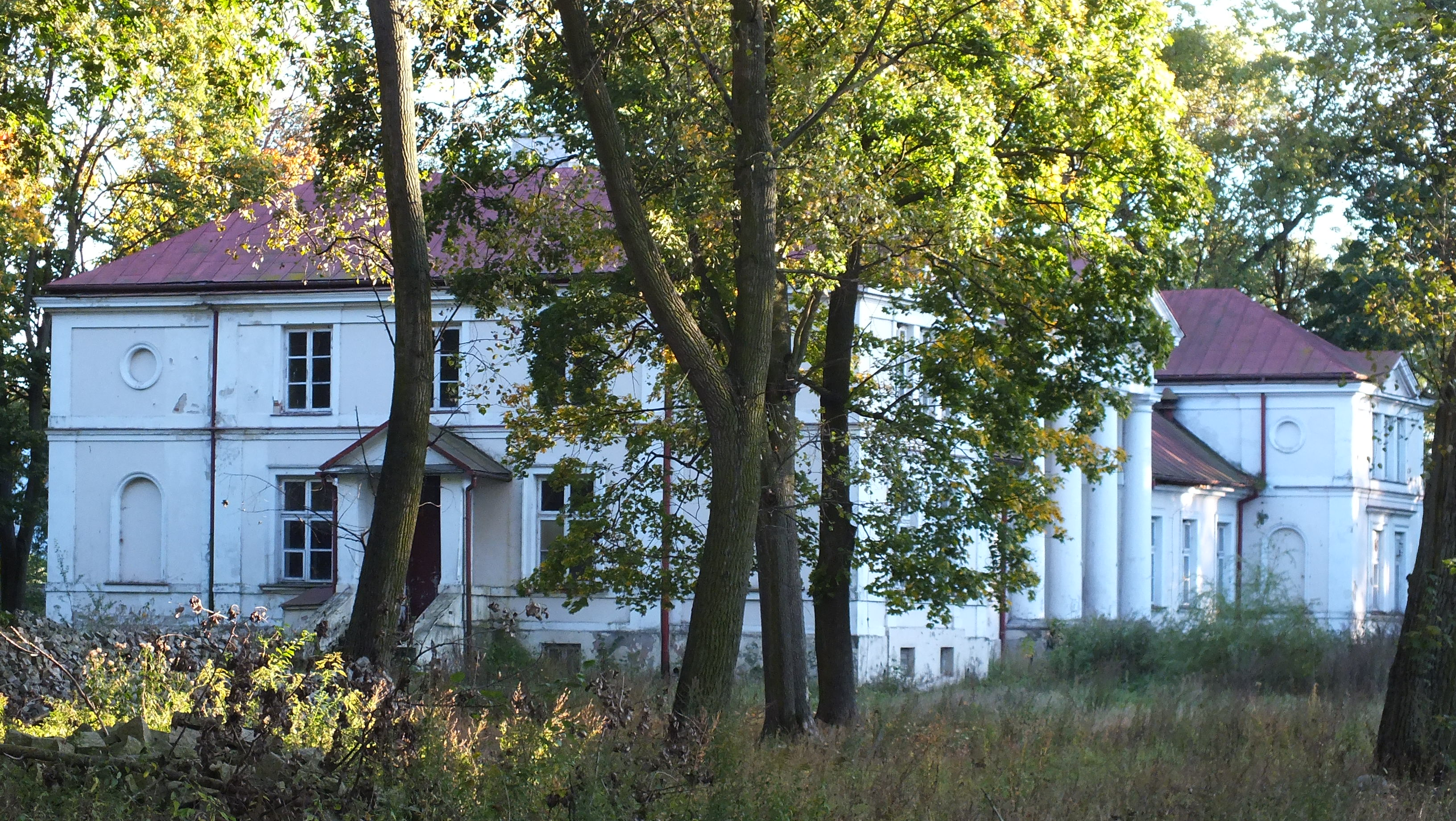
- Samoklęski Palace

- Location within Poland
- Coordinates: 51°27′N 22°26′E
- Country: Poland
- Voivodeship: Lublin
- County: Lubartów
- Gmina: Kamionka
- Vehicle registration: LLB

Samoklęski [samɔˈklɛ̃ski] is a village in the administrative district of Gmina Kamionka, within Lubartów County, Lublin Voivodeship, in eastern Poland.

== History ==
Samoklęski was a private village of Polish nobility, including the Ożarowski, Tęczyński, Opaliński, Lubomirski, Sieniawski and Czartoryski families, administratively located in the Lublin Voivodeship in the Lesser Poland Province. Noblewoman Izabela Czartoryska founded a park in Samoklęski. In 1824, the estate was bought by Polish general Jan Weyssenhoff. In 1827, Samoklęski had a population of 331.

Following the joint German-Soviet invasion of Poland, which started World War II in September 1939, the village was occupied by Germany until 1944. In January 1943, the Germans perpetrated a massacre of 27 Jews and local Pole Bolesław Dąbrowski, who was accused of rescuing Jews from the Holocaust.
