= Starościn, Lublin Voivodeship =

Starościn
- Village
- Location within Poland
- Coordinates: 51°24′3″N 22°25′0″E
- Country: Poland
- Voivodeship: Lublin
- County: Lubartów
- Gmina: Kamionka
- Time zone: UTC+1 (CET)
  - Summer (DST): UTC+2 (CEST)

Starościn [staˈrɔɕt͡ɕin] is a village in the administrative district of Gmina Kamionka, within Lubartów County, Lublin Voivodeship, in eastern Poland.

== History ==
Six Polish citizens were murdered by Nazi Germany in the village during World War II.
