= Kozie Góry Nature Reserve =

Nature reserve in Poland

Coordinates: 51.4°N 22.5833°E

Kozie Góry is nature reserve in Lubartów County, Lublin Voivodeship in Poland.
