= Kierzkówka =

- Village
- Location within Poland
- Coordinates: 51°29′35″N 22°25′48″E
- Country: Poland
- Voivodeship: Lublin
- County: Lubartów
- Gmina: Kamionka

Kierzkówka [kʲɛʂˈkufka] is a village in the administrative district of Gmina Kamionka, within Lubartów County, Lublin Voivodeship, in eastern Poland.
