= Amelin, Lubartów County =

Amelin
- Village
- Location within Poland
- Coordinates: 51°26′N 22°22′E
- Country: Poland
- Voivodeship: Lublin
- County: Lubartów
- Gmina: Kamionka

Amelin [aˈmɛlin] is a village in the administrative district of Gmina Kamionka, within Lubartów County, Lublin Voivodeship, in eastern Poland.
