= Cesano =

Cesano may refer to:

- Cesano Boscone, a comune (municipality) in the province of Milan, northern Italy
- Cesano Maderno, a comune in the province of Milan, northern Italy
- Cesano (RM), a frazione of the comune of Rome, Italy
- Cesano, a frazione of the comune of Senigallia, Marche, Italy
- Cesano (river), in the Italian Marche
