= Kozłówka, Lublin Voivodeship =

Kozłówka
- Village
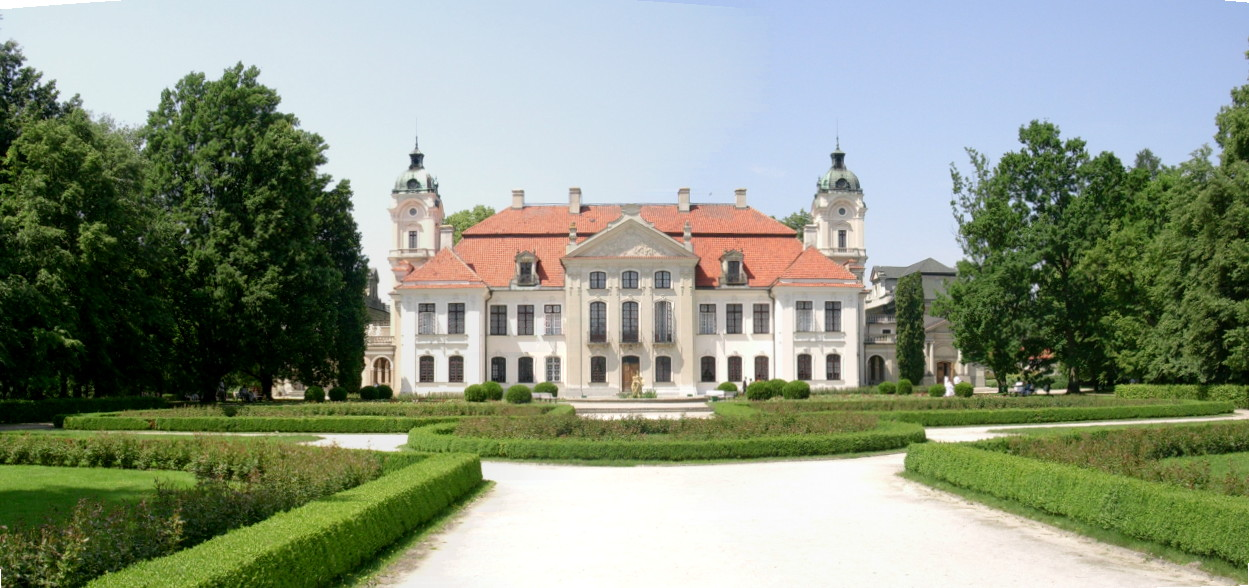
- Kozłówka Palace

- Location within Poland
- Coordinates: 51°26′58″N 22°29′45″E
- Country: Poland
- Voivodeship: Lublin
- County: Lubartów
- Gmina: Kamionka

Population
  - Total: 820
- Website: http://kozlowka.fm.interia.pl/

Kozłówka [kɔˈzwufka] is a village in the administrative district of Gmina Kamionka, within Lubartów County, Lublin Voivodeship, in eastern Poland.

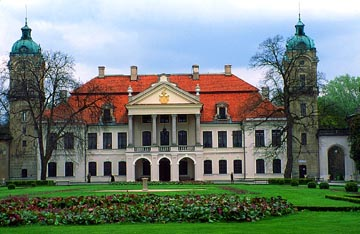

In Kozłówka is located a Baroque/Classical palace, and the park is now a museum of the Zamoyski family. The museum also has one part dedicated to now unwanted communist sculpture and other art.
