= Mieczyslaw Gruber =

Polish-American soldier and prisoner of war

Miecyslaw Gruber
- Born: January 3, 1913; Podhajce Poland
- Died: June 17, 2006 (aged 93); New York, New York
- Citizenship: Polish, later American

Samuel Gruber aka Mieczyslaw Gruber (January 3, 1913 – June 17, 2006) was born in Podhajce, Poland (now Pidhaitsi, Ukraine). As a youth, Gruber belonged to the Zionist organizations Hashomer Hatzair and HeHalutz. When he was 14, Gruber went to Lwów, Poland (now Lviv, Ukraine) to attend high school. After graduation, Gruber remained in Lwów for about two years. He then returned to Podhajce where he worked as a bookkeeper for a company that manufactured farm equipment and bicycles.

Gruber was drafted to the Polish Army when he was 18 or 19. He served for a year and a half in Tarnopol, Ukraine. Two or three weeks before the war broke out in 1939, Samuel was called into the reserves. While training in Nowy Sącz, Poland, Gruber's unit was unaware that the German forces had penetrated deep into Poland. The Germans surrounded Samuel's unit and fighting broke out. Samuel was shot in the arm and taken as a prisoner of war.

After a month in the hospital, Gruber and the other prisoners were transported to Stalag 13, a camp in Langwasser, Germany, near Nuremberg. On the second day, Jews were ordered to present themselves. Gruber hesitated, but two of his Polish "friends" shoved him forwards saying, "Here is a Jew." The prisoners were transported from Nuremberg to Ludwigsburg and then to Münsingen, Germany. Because of his injured arm, Gruber was assigned to work in the kitchen. Gruber spoke fluent German, so he also helped out in the German offices.

In 1941, Gruber and the other prisoners were transported to Gleiwitz (Gliwice), Poland and then to Lipowa 7 camp, Lublin, Poland. There, Gruber was forced to help build the Majdanek camp. Later that year, Soviet prisoners of war became the first inmates. Gruber recalled that the Soviets were treated horribly. A typhus epidemic broke out and Gruber, along with 400 others, was quarantined in a synagogue. A doctor with whom Gruber was acquainted gave him a shot that saved his life. Three hundred people died during the typhus outbreak.

Gruber was assigned to work in an office of a hospital that distributed uniforms, rifles and pistols to German soldiers coming from the front. He was able to steal weapons, which were eventually sold to partisans. A Polish man advised Gruber to escape, saying that eventually everyone in the camps would be killed. On October 28, 1942, Gruber walked through Lublin to the forest, on the outskirts of town. Two partisans met Gruber and 22 other people, whom he had convinced to leave with him. Gruber was the leader of his partisan group. He changed his first name to Mietek, a typical Polish name, so that the Polish farmers would not know that he was Jewish.

His group eventually joined the Parczew partisans and fought the Germans while attempting to save as many Jewish lives as possible. Gruber was liberated when the Soviets captured Lublin in 1944. He married in 1945. In 1946, Gruber left Poland. He was made head of a displaced persons camp for children at Prien am Chiemsee, Germany in 1947. Gruber immigrated to the United States in 1949.

== Notes ==
This article incorporates text from the United States Holocaust Memorial Museum, and has been released under the GFDL.
