= Franco Cesana =

Italian partisan (1931–1944)

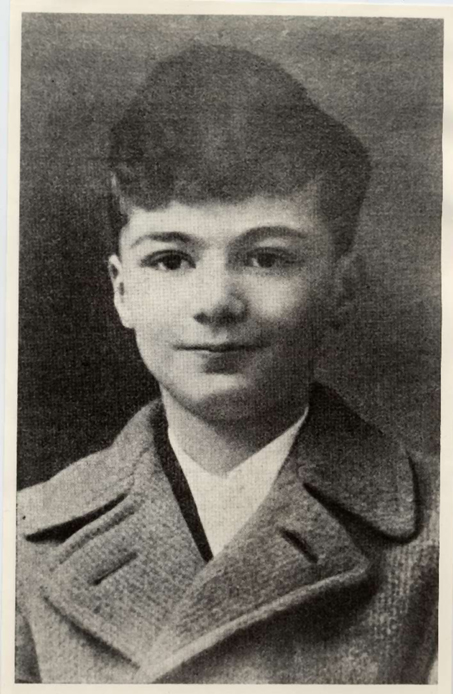

Franco Cesana (20 September 1931 – 14 September 1944) was an Italian Jew, born in the northern city of Bologna. He is said to have been youngest partisan to die in the Italian Resistance.

His father was Felice, and his mother was Ada Basevi. Franco had two brothers: Ermanno, born in 1918, and Lelio, born in 1920. The family moved to Roma, then to Bologna. In 1938 Mussolini's "racial laws" were introduced and Franco was expelled from public school, and had to go instead to a "Jewish school" jury-rigged in a local synagogue. He did not understand why he had to leave his friends just because he was Jewish. His father died in 1939 and he moved in with relatives.

Soon after Mussolini was overthrown, the Nazis invaded Italy, and Italian Jews had to go into hiding or be sent to the concentration camps. The Cesana family hid in the Apennine Mountains, next to Modena. Franco's family had to move from hut to hut in the mountains in order to evade the German soldiers and stayed for a long time with the Manelli family in Varana. Franco, who was twelve at the time, joined one of the Justice and Liberty partisan group with his brother Lelio. Their group was brigata Scarabelli. Not much later, on 14 September 1944, he was shot by Germans on a scouting mission in the mountains, next to Gombola, and his body was returned to his mother on his thirteenth birthday. He received the Bronze Medal of Military Valor in memory.

== See also ==
- Museum of Italian Judaism and the Shoah
