= Kamionka, Lubartów County =

Kamionka
- Town
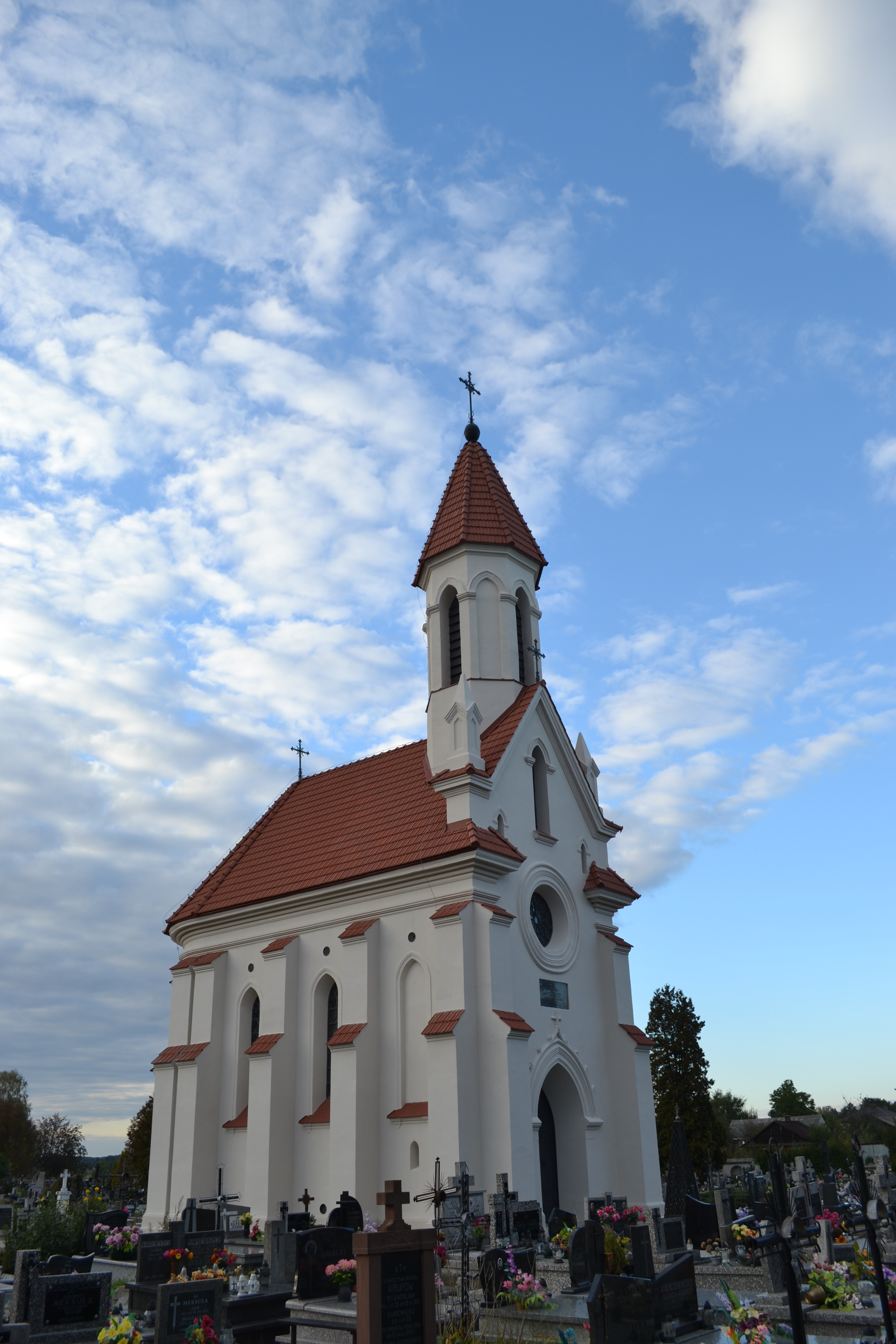
- Cemetery chapel of the Zamoyski family at the parish cemetery

- Flag Coat of arms

- Location within Poland
- Coordinates: 51°28′18″N 22°27′46″E
- Country: Poland
- Voivodeship: Lublin
- County: Lubartów
- Gmina: Kamionka

Population
  - Total: 1,800
- Time zone: UTC+1 (CET)
  - Summer (DST): UTC+2 (CEST)
- Vehicle registration: LLB
- Primary airport: Lublin Airport

Kamionka [kaˈmjɔnka] is a town in Lubartów County, Lublin Voivodeship, in eastern Poland. It is the seat of the gmina (administrative district) called Gmina Kamionka. The town has a population of 1,800.

== History ==
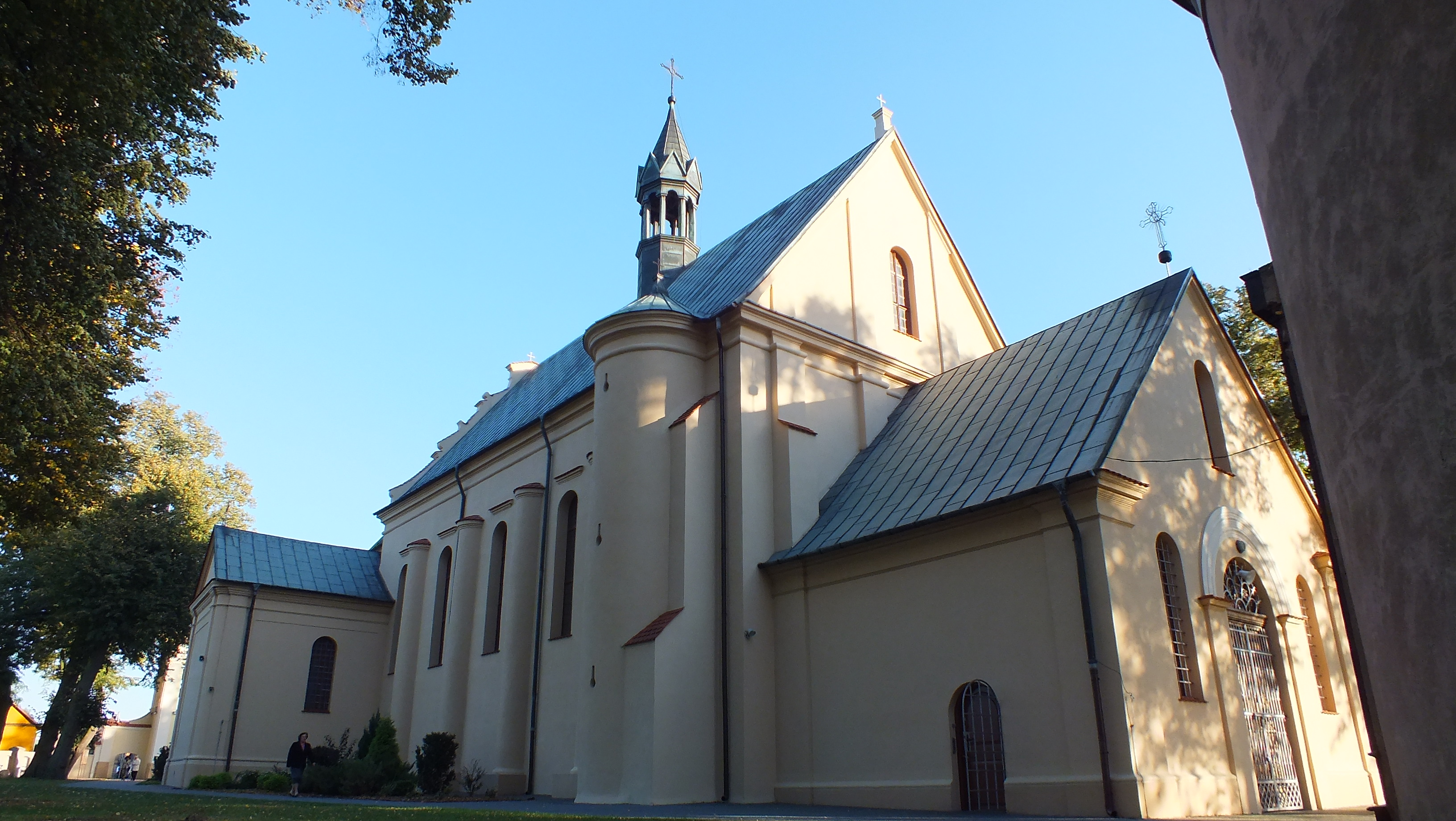
Saints Peter and Paul church

The first mention of the settlement came in 1450, and it received its town rights in the late 15th century - which it held until 1863. In 1531 the current parish church: was built, replacing an earlier wooden church: from 1459. The wooden church had been a Protestant church: for a while after 1570. In the 18th century the village was famous for linen, but it had a poor location for trading. To the north of the village is a large wood of coniferous trees. There is also a small settlement consisting of two farmsteads at the edge of a large wood, 2 km (1 mi) to the north, with the same name.

During the German occupation of Poland (World War II), local Poles, including the wójt (head of the local administration) and the parish priest, were among the victims of massacres of Poles committed by the Germans on December 23, 1939, in nearby Lubartów and on January 6, 1940, in Lemszczyzna (present-day district of Lublin).

== Cuisine ==
Among the protected traditional local foods, as designated by the Ministry of Agriculture and Rural Development of Poland, is buckwheat honey, typical to the Lublin Region including Kamionka. Rich in magnesium, iron, vitamin C and protein, it is used to treat a wide range of diseases.
