= Achilles Puchała =

Polish Roman Catholic Franciscan friar and martyr

Blessed Achilles Puchała OFM Conv.
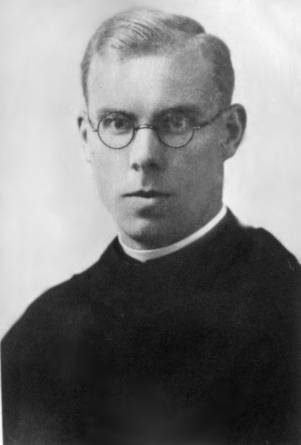
- Puchała circa 1938

Martyr
- Born: Józef Achilles Puchała; 18 March 1911; Kosina, Poland
- Died: 19 July 1943 (aged 32); Borowikowszczyzna
- Venerated in: Roman Catholic Church
- Beatified: 13 June 1999, Warsaw, Poland by Pope John Paul II
- Feast: 12 June

Józef Achilles Puchała, OFM Conv. (18 March 1911 – 19 July 1943) was a Polish Conventual Franciscan friar from the Iwieniec (Ivyanets) friary who was tortured and killed by the Nazis during World War II and beatified by Pope John Paul II on 13 June 1999.

== Biography ==
Puchała was born on 18 March 1911 to Franciszek and Zofia Puchała (née Olbrycht), and was baptized the same day. He entered the Conventual Franciscan seminary in Lviv in 1924, at the age of 13; there, he received the religious name Achilles. He professed simple vows in 1928 and professed solemn vows on 22 May 1932, after which he continued his studies in Kraków. He was ordained a priest on 5 July 1932, and continued his studies for a year after his ordination.

Puchała first worked at Franciscan convents located in Grodno and Ivyanyets. In late 1939, he assumed the position of parish priest of the Church of St. George in Pershai (modern-day Belarus) after it had been abandoned during the invasion of Poland. He was stated to have helped various families materially.

In July and August 1943, the Nazis launched Operation Hermann as retaliation for an earlier attack by Polish partisans near Ivyanyets. When SS units appeared in Pershai on 19 June 1943, Puchała hid alongside Hermann Stępień (who was also assigned to the Church of St. George), though he was convinced to join the 200–300 villagers that were rounded up. They were then driven at bayonet point to Borowikowszczyzna, where Puchała and Stępień were tortured and killed at a nearby barn, which was then set ablaze.

== Veneration ==
Puchała was beatified on 13 June 1999 by Pope John Paul II alongside the 108 Martyrs of World War II.
