= Ivyanyets rural council =

Ivyanyets rural council (Belarusian: Івянецкі сельсавет; Russian: Ивенецкий сельсовет) is a lower-level subdivision (selsoviet) of Valozhyn district, Minsk region, Belarus. Its administrative center is Ivyanyets.
