= Pharisees =

Jewish social movement and school of thought

Pharisees פרושים
- Historical leaders: Simeon ben Shetach; Salome Alexandra; Hyrcanus II
- Founded: 167 BC
- Dissolved: 73 AD
- Headquarters: Jerusalem
- Ideology: Theocracy; Oral Torah; Populism
- Religion: Rabbinic Judaism

The Pharisees (/ˈfærəsiːz/; Hebrew: פְּרוּשִׁים, romanized: Pərūšīm, lit. 'separated ones') were a Jewish social movement and school of thought in the Levant during the time of Second Temple Judaism. Following the destruction of the Second Temple in 70 AD, Pharisaic beliefs became the foundational, liturgical, and ritualistic basis for Rabbinic Judaism. Although the group no longer exists, their traditions are of great importance for the manifold Jewish religious movements.

Conflicts between Pharisees and Sadducees took place in the context of much broader and longstanding social and religious conflicts amongst Jews (exacerbated by the Roman conquest). One conflict was cultural, between those who favored Hellenization (the Sadducees) and those who resisted it (the Pharisees). Another was juridical-religious, between those who emphasized the importance of the Temple with its rites and services (Sadducees), and those who emphasized the importance of other Mosaic Laws (Pharisees). A specifically religious point of conflict involved different interpretations of the Torah and how to apply it to Jewish life: Sadducees recognized only the Written Torah (תּוֹרָה שֶׁבִּכְתָב, Tōrā šebbīḵṯāv, '"Written Law"'), rejecting Prophets, Writings, and doctrines such as the Oral Torah and the resurrection of the dead.

The contemporary Jewish historian Josephus, believed by many historians to have been a Pharisee, estimated there were around 6,000 adherents to the Pharisee movement before the fall of the Second Temple. He said that Pharisee influence over the common people was so great that anything they said against the king or the high priest was believed, apparently in contrast to the more elite Sadducees, who were the upper class. Pharisees claimed Mosaic authority for their interpretation of Jewish religious law, while Sadducees represented the authority of the priestly privileges and prerogatives established since the days of Solomon, when Zadok, their ancestor, officiated as high priest.

== Etymology ==
"Pharisee" is derived from Ancient Greek Pharisaios (Φαρισαῖος), from Aramaic Pərīšā (פְּרִישָׁא), plural Pərīšayyā (פְּרִישַׁיָּא), meaning "set apart, separated", related to Hebrew Pārūš (פָּרוּשׁ), plural Pərūšīm (פְּרוּשִׁים), the Qal passive participle of the verb pāraš (פָּרַשׁ). It may refer to their separation from Gentiles, sources of ritual impurity, or from irreligious Jews.Alternatively, it may have a particular political meaning as "separatists", due to their division from the Sadducee elite: Yitzhak Isaac Halevi characterizes the Sadducees and Pharisees as political rather than religious sects. Scholar Thomas Walter Manson and Talmud expert Louis Finkelstein suggest that "Pharisee" derives from the Aramaic words pārsāh or parsāh, meaning "Persian" or "Persianizer", based on the demonym pārsi, meaning 'Persian' in the Persian language, and further akin to Pārsa and Fārs. Harvard University scholar Shaye J. D. Cohen denies this, stating: "Practically all scholars now agree that the name "Pharisee" derives from the Hebrew and Aramaic parush or persushi."

== Early sources ==
The first historical mention of the Pharisees and their beliefs comes in the four gospels and the Acts of the Apostles, in which both their meticulous adherence to their interpretation of the Torah as well as their eschatological views are described. A later historical mention of the Pharisees comes from the Jewish-Roman historian Josephus in a description of the "four schools of thought", or "four sects", into which he divides the Jews in the 1st century AD. (The other schools were the Essenes, who were generally apolitical, and may have emerged as a sect of dissident priests who rejected either the Seleucid-appointed or the Hasmonean high priests as illegitimate; the Sadducees, who were the main antagonists of the Pharisees; and the Zealots.) Other sects may have emerged at this time, such as the early Christians in Jerusalem and the Therapeutae in Egypt. However, their status as Jews is unclear.

The Books of the Maccabees—two deuterocanonical books in the Bible—focus on the Maccabean Revolt against the Seleucids under King Antiochus IV Epiphanes, and concludes with the defeat of General Nicanor in 161 BC by Judas Maccabeus, the hero of the work. It includes several theological points: prayer for the dead, the last judgment, intercession of saints, and martyrology. The New Testament apocrypha, known as the Gospel of Peter, also alludes to the Pharisees.

Judah ha-Nasi redacted the Mishnah, an authoritative codification of Pharisaic interpretations, around 200 AD. Most of the authorities quoted in the Mishnah lived after the destruction of the Temple in 70 AD; consequently, it marked the beginning of the transition from Pharisaic to Rabbinic Judaism. The Mishnah was important because it compiled the oral interpretations and traditions of the Pharisees (and later the rabbis) into a single authoritative text, thus allowing oral tradition in Judaism to survive the destruction of the Second Temple. However, none of the rabbinic sources include identifiable eyewitness accounts of the Pharisees and their teachings.

== History ==
=== From c. 600 BC – c. 160 BC ===
The deportation and exile of an unknown number of Jews of the Kingdom of Judah to Babylon by Nebuchadnezzar II—starting with the first deportation in 597 BC, and continuing after the fall of Jerusalem and destruction of the Temple in 587 BC—resulted in dramatic changes to Jewish culture and religion. During the 70-year exile in Babylon, Jewish houses of assembly (known in Hebrew as a beit knesset, or in Greek as a synagogue) and houses of prayer (Hebrew Beit Tefilah; Greek προσευχαί, proseuchai) were the primary meeting places for prayer, and the house of study (beit midrash) was the counterpart for the synagogue.

In 539 BC, the Persians conquered Babylon, and in 537 BC, Cyrus the Great allowed Jews to return to Judea and rebuild the Temple. He did not, however, allow the restoration of the Judean monarchy, which left the Judean priests as the dominant authority. Without the constraining power of the monarchy, the authority of the Temple in civic life was amplified. It was around this time that the Sadducee party emerged as the party of priests and allied elites. However, the Second Temple, which was completed in 515 BC, had been constructed under the auspices of a foreign power, and there were lingering questions about its legitimacy. This provided the condition for the development of various sects or "schools of thought", each of which claimed exclusive authority to represent "Judaism", and which typically shunned social intercourse, especially marriage, with members of other sects.

The Temple was no longer the only institution for Jewish religious life. After the building of the Second Temple in the time of Ezra, the houses of study and worship remained important secondary institutions in Jewish life. Outside Judea, the synagogue was often called a house of prayer. While most Jews could not regularly attend the Temple service, they could meet at the synagogue for morning, afternoon, and evening prayers. On Mondays, Thursdays, and Shabbat, a weekly Torah portion was read publicly in the synagogues, following the tradition of public Torah readings instituted by Ezra. Although priests controlled the rituals of the Temple, the scribes and sages, later called rabbis (Hebrew for "Teacher/master"), dominated the study of the Torah. These men maintained an oral tradition that they believed had originated at Mount Sinai alongside the Torah of Moses; a God-given interpretation of the Torah.

The Hellenistic period of Jewish history began when Alexander the Great conquered Persia in 332 BC. The rift between the priests and the sages developed during this time, when Jews faced new political and cultural struggles. This created a sort of schism in the Jewish community. After Alexander's death in 323 BC, Judea was ruled by the Egyptian-Hellenic Ptolemies until 198 BC, when the Syrian-Hellenic Seleucid Empire, under Antiochus III, seized control. In 167 BC, the Seleucid King Antiochus IV invaded Judea, entered the Temple, and stripped it of money and ceremonial objects. He imposed a program of forced Hellenization, requiring Jews to abandon their own laws and customs, thus precipitating the Maccabean Revolt. Jerusalem was liberated in 165 BC, and the Temple was restored. In 141 BC, an assembly of priests and others affirmed Simon Maccabeus as high priest and leader, in effect establishing the Hasmonean dynasty.

=== Emergence of the Pharisees ===
John Hyrcanus from Guillaume Rouillé's Promptuarium Iconum Insigniorum (1553)

After defeating the Seleucid forces, Judas Maccabaeus's nephew, John Hyrcanus, established a new monarchy in the form of the priestly Hasmonean dynasty in 152 BC, thus establishing priests as both political and religious authorities. Although the Hasmoneans were considered heroes for resisting the Seleucids, their reign lacked the legitimacy conferred by descent from the Davidic dynasty of the First Temple era.

The Pharisees emerged largely out of the group of scribes and sages.. The Pharisees, among other Jewish sects, were active from the middle of the 2nd century BC until the destruction of the Temple in 70 AD. Josephus first mentions them in connection with Jonathan Apphus, the successor of Judas Maccabeus. One of the factors that distinguished the Pharisees from other groups prior to the destruction of the Temple was their belief that all Jews had to observe the purity laws (which applied to the Temple service) outside the Temple. The major difference, however, was the continued adherence of the Pharisees to the laws and traditions of the Jewish people in the face of assimilation. As Josephus notes, the Pharisees were considered the most expert and accurate expositors of Jewish law.

Josephus indicates that the Pharisees received the backing and good-will of the common people, apparently in contrast to the more elite Sadducees associated with the ruling classes. In general, whereas the Sadducees were aristocratic monarchists, the Pharisees were eclectic, popular, and more democratic. The Pharisaic position is exemplified by the assertion that "A learned mamzer takes precedence over an ignorant High Priest." (A mamzer—literally "bastard", according to the Pharisaic definition—is an outcast child born of a forbidden relationship, such as adultery or incest, in which marriage of the parents could not lawfully occur. The word is often but incorrectly translated as "illegitimate".)

Sadducees rejected the Pharisaic tenet of an Oral Torah, creating two Jewish understandings of the Torah. An example of this differing approach is the interpretation of "an eye in place of an eye". The Pharisaic understanding was that the value of an eye was to be paid by the perpetrator. In the Sadducees' view, the words were given a more literal interpretation, in which the offender's eye would be removed.

The sages of the Talmud saw a direct link between themselves and the Pharisees, and historians generally consider Pharisaic Judaism to be the progenitor of Rabbinic Judaism, that is normative, mainstream Judaism after the destruction of the Second Temple. All mainstream forms of Judaism today consider themselves heirs of Rabbinic Judaism and, ultimately, the Pharisees.

=== Hasmonean period ===
Although the Pharisees did not support the wars of expansion of the Hasmoneans and the forced conversions of the Idumeans, the political rift between them became wider when a Pharisee named Eleazar insulted the Hasmonean ethnarch John Hyrcanus at his own table, suggesting that he should abandon his role as High Priest due to a rumour (probably untrue) that he had been conceived while his mother was a prisoner of war. In response, he distanced himself from the Pharisees.

After the death of John Hyrcanus, his younger son, Alexander Jannaeus, made himself king, and openly sided with the Sadducees by adopting their rites in the Temple. His actions caused a riot in the Temple, and led to a brief civil war that ended with a bloody repression of the Pharisees. However, on his deathbed, Jannaeus advised his widow, Salome Alexandra, to seek reconciliation with the Pharisees. Her brother was Shimon ben Shetach, a leading Pharisee. Josephus attests that Salome was favorably inclined toward the Pharisees, and their political influence grew tremendously under her reign, especially in the Sanhedrin or Jewish Council, which they came to dominate.

Following Salome's death, her elder son, Hyrcanus II, was generally supported by the Pharisees. Her younger son, Aristobulus II, was in conflict with Hyrcanus and tried to seize power. The Pharisees seemed to be in a vulnerable position at this time. The conflict between the two sons culminated in a civil war that ended when the Roman general Pompey intervened and captured Jerusalem in 63 BC. Josephus' account may overstate the role of the Pharisees. He reports elsewhere that the Pharisees did not grow to power until the reign of Salome. As Josephus was a Pharisee, his account may represent a historical creation meant to elevate the status of the Pharisees during the height of the Hasmonean dynasty.

Later texts, like the Mishnah and the Talmud, record a host of rulings by rabbis, some of whom are believed to be from among the Pharisees, concerning sacrifices and other ritual practices in the Temple, torts, criminal law, and governance. In their day, the influence of the Pharisees over the lives of the common people was strong, and their rulings on Jewish law were deemed authoritative by many.

=== Roman period ===
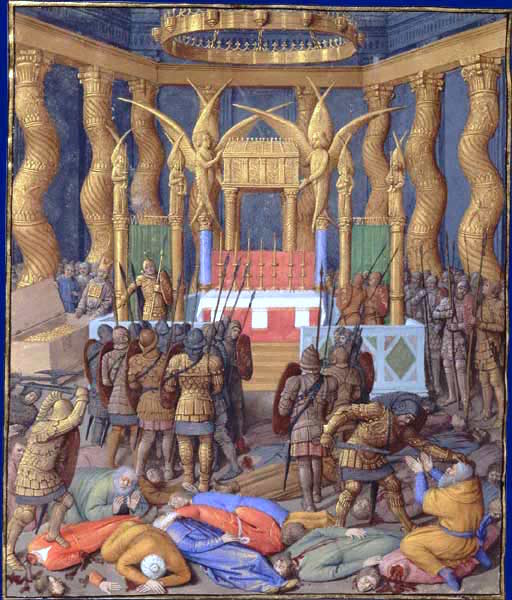
Pompey in the Temple of Jerusalem, by Jean Fouquet

According to Josephus, the Pharisees appeared before Pompey, asking him to interfere and restore the old priesthood, while abolishing the royalty of the Hasmoneans altogether. The Pharisees also opened Jerusalem's gates to the Romans, and actively supported them against the Sadducean faction. When the Romans finally broke the entrance to Jerusalem's Temple, the Pharisees killed the priests who were officiating the Temple services on Sabbath. They regarded Pompey's defilement of the Temple in Jerusalem as a divine punishment of Sadducean misrule. Pompey ended the monarchy in 63 BC, and named Hyrcanus II high priest and ethnarch (a lesser title than "king"). Six years later, Hyrcanus was deprived of the remainder of political authority, and ultimate jurisdiction was given to the proconsul of Syria, who ruled through Hyrcanus's Idumaean associate, Antipater, and later, Antipater's two sons, Phasael (military governor of Judea) and Herod (military governor of Galilee). In 40 BC, Aristobulus's son, Antigonus, overthrew Hyrcanus, and named himself king and high priest, whereafter Herod fled to Rome.

In Rome, Herod sought the support of Mark Antony and Octavian, and secured recognition by the Roman Senate as king, confirming the termination of the Hasmonean dynasty. According to Josephus, Sadducean opposition to Herod led him to treat the Pharisees favorably. Herod was an unpopular ruler, perceived as a Roman puppet. Despite his restoration and expansion of the Second Temple, Herod's notorious treatment of his own family and of the last Hasmonaeans further eroded his popularity. According to Josephus, the Pharisees ultimately opposed him, and thus fell victims (4 BC) to his bloodthirstiness. The family of Boethus, whom Herod had raised to the high-priesthood, revived the spirit of the Sadducees, and thenceforth the Pharisees again had them as antagonists.

While it stood, the Second Temple remained the center of Jewish ritual life. Jews were required to travel to Jerusalem and offer sacrifices at the Temple three times per year: Pesach (Passover), Shavuot (the Feast of Weeks), and Sukkot (the Feast of Tabernacles). The Pharisees, like the Sadducees, were politically quiescent, and studied, taught, and worshiped in their own way. At this time, serious theological differences emerged between the Sadducees and Pharisees. The notion that the sacred could exist outside the Temple, a view central to the Essenes, was shared and elevated by the Pharisees.

=== From Pharisees to rabbis ===
Following the Jewish–Roman wars, revolutionaries like the Zealots had been crushed by the Romans, and had little credibility (the last Zealots died at Masada in 73 AD). Similarly, the Sadducees, whose teachings were closely connected to the Temple, disappeared with the destruction of the Second Temple in 70 AD. The Essenes also disappeared, perhaps because their teachings so diverged from the concerns of the times, or perhaps because they were sacked by the Romans at Qumran. Of all the major Second Temple sects, only the Pharisees remained. Their vision of Jewish law as a means by which ordinary people could engage with the sacred in their daily lives was a position meaningful to the majority of Jews. Such teachings extended beyond ritual practices. According to the classic midrash in Avot D'Rabbi Nathan (4:5):

The Temple is destroyed. We never witnessed its glory. But Rabbi Joshua did. And when he looked at the Temple ruins one day, he burst into tears. "Alas for us! The place which atoned for the sins of all the people Israel lies in ruins!" Then Rabbi Yohannan ben Zakkai spoke to him these words of comfort: "Be not grieved, my son. There is another way of gaining ritual atonement, even though the Temple is destroyed. We must now gain ritual atonement through deeds of loving-kindness."

Following the destruction of the Temple, Rome governed Judea through a procurator at Caesarea and a Jewish patriarch, and additionally levied the Fiscus Judaicus. Yohanan ben Zakkai, a leading Pharisee, was appointed the first patriarch (the Hebrew word nasi also means prince or president), and he reestablished the Sanhedrin at Yavneh (see the related Council of Jamnia) under Pharisee control. Instead of giving tithes to the priests and sacrificing offerings at the destroyed Temple, the rabbis instructed Jews to give charity. Moreover, they argued that all Jews should study in local synagogues, because the Torah is "the inheritance of the congregation of Jacob" (Deuteronomy 33:4).

After the destruction of the First Temple, Jews believed that God would forgive them and enable them to rebuild the Temple—an event that actually occurred within three generations. After the destruction of the Second Temple, Jews wondered whether this would happen again. When the Emperor Hadrian threatened to rebuild Jerusalem as a pagan city dedicated to Jupiter in 132 AD, some of the leading sages of the Sanhedrin supported a rebellion led by Simon Bar Kosiba (later known as Bar Kokhba), who established a short-lived independent state that was conquered by the Romans in 135 AD. With this defeat, the Jews' hopes that the Temple would be rebuilt were crushed. Nonetheless, belief in a Third Temple remains a cornerstone of Jewish belief.

Romans forbade Jews to enter Jerusalem (except for the day of Tisha B'Av), and prohibited any plan to rebuild the Temple. Instead, it took over the Province of Judea directly, renaming it Syria Palaestina, and renaming Jerusalem Aelia Capitolina. Romans did eventually reconstitute the Sanhedrin under the leadership of Judah haNasi (who claimed to be a descendant of King David). They conferred the title of "nasi" as hereditary, and Judah's sons served both as patriarch and as heads of the Sanhedrin.

=== Post-Temple developments ===
According to historian Shaye Cohen, by the time three generations had passed after the destruction of the Second Temple, most Jews concluded that the Temple would not be rebuilt during their lives nor in the foreseeable future. Jews were now confronted with difficult and far-reaching questions:

- How to achieve atonement without the Temple?
- How to explain the disastrous outcome of the rebellion?
- How to live in the post-Temple, Romanized world?
- How to connect present and past traditions?

Regardless of the importance they gave to the Temple, and despite their support of Bar Koseba's revolt, the Pharisees' vision of Jewish law as a means by which ordinary people could engage with the sacred in their daily lives provided them with a position from which to respond to all four challenges in a way meaningful to the vast majority of Jews. Their responses would constitute Rabbinic Judaism.

After the destruction of the Second Temple, the sectarian divisions ended. The rabbis avoided the term "Pharisee", perhaps because it was a term more often used by non-Pharisees, but also because the term was explicitly sectarian. The rabbis claimed leadership over all Jews, and added to the Amidah the birkat haMinim, a prayer which in part exclaims, "Praised are You O Lord, who breaks enemies and defeats the wicked", and which is understood as a rejection of sectarians and sectarianism. This shift by no means resolved conflicts over the interpretation of the Torah; rather, it relocated debates between sects to debates within Rabbinic Judaism. The Pharisaic commitment to scholarly debate as a value in and of itself, rather than merely a byproduct of sectarianism, emerged as a defining feature of Rabbinic Judaism.

Thus, as the Pharisees argued that all Israel should act as priests, the rabbis argued that all Israel should act as rabbis: "The rabbis furthermore want to transform the entire Jewish community into an academy where the whole Torah is studied and kept .... redemption depends on the "rabbinization" of all Israel, that is, upon the attainment of all Jewry of a full and complete embodiment of revelation or Torah, thus achieving a perfect replica of heaven." Rabbinic Judaism, at this time and afterwards, contained the idea of the Heavenly Academy, a heavenly institute where God taught scripture.

The rabbinic era is divided into two periods. The first period was that of the Tannaim (from the Aramaic word for "repeat;" the Aramaic root TNY is equivalent to the Hebrew root SNY, which is the basis for "Mishnah". Thus, Tannaim are "Mishnah teachers"), the sages who repeated and thus passed down the Oral Torah. During this period, rabbis finalized the canonization of the Tanakh, and in 200 AD, Judah haNasi edited together Tannaitic judgements and traditions into the Mishnah, considered by the rabbis to be the definitive expression of the Oral Torah (although some of the sages mentioned in the Mishnah are Pharisees who lived prior to the destruction of the Second Temple, or prior to the Bar Kozeba revolt, most of the sages mentioned lived after the revolt).

The second period is that of the Amoraim (from the Aramaic word for "speaker") rabbis and their students, who continued to debate legal matters and discuss the meaning of the books of the Bible. In Judea, these discussions occurred at academies at Tiberias, Caesarea, and Sepphoris. In Babylonia, these discussions largely occurred at academies that had been established at Nehardea, Pumpeditha, and Sura. This tradition of study and debate reached its fullest expression in the development of the Talmudim, elaborations of the Mishnah and records of Rabbinic debates, stories, and judgements, compiled around 400 AD in Judea and around 500 AD in Babylon.

Rabbinic Judaism eventually emerged as normative Judaism, and in fact, many today refer to Rabbinic Judaism simply as "Judaism." Rabbinic scholar Jacob Neusner, however, stated that the Amoraim had no ultimate power in their communities. They lived at a time when Jews were subjects of either the Roman or Iranian (Parthian and Persian) empires. These empires left the day-to-day governance in the hands of the Jewish authorities: in Roman Palestine, through the hereditary office of patriarch (also simultaneously the head of the Sanhedrin); in Babylonia, through the hereditary office of the Reish Galuta, the "Head of the Exile" or "Exilarch" (who ratified the appointment of the heads of Rabbinical academies.) According to Jacob Neusner:

The "Judaism" of the rabbis at this time is in no degree either normal or normative, and speaking descriptively, the schools cannot be called "elite." Whatever their aspirations for the future and pretensions in the present, the rabbis, though powerful and influential, constitute a minority group seeking to exercise authority without much governmental support, to dominate without substantial means of coercion.

In Neusner's view, the rabbinic project, as acted out in the Talmud, reflected not the world as it was, but the world as rabbis dreamed it should be.

According to historian Salo Baron, however, there existed "a general willingness of the people to follow its self-imposed Rabbinic rulership." Although the rabbis lacked authority to impose capital punishment, "Flagellation and heavy fines, combined with an extensive system of excommunication, were more than enough to uphold the authority of the courts." In fact, the rabbis took over more and more power from the Reish Galuta, until eventually, R' Ashi assumed the title rabbana, heretofore assumed by the exilarch, and appeared together with two other rabbis as an official delegation "at the gate of King Yazdegard's court." The Amorah (and Tanna) Rav was a personal friend of Parthian King Artabenus IV, and Shmuel was close to King Shapur I of Persia. Thus, the rabbis had significant means of "coercion", and the people seemed to have followed the rabbinic rulership.

== Beliefs ==
At first, the values of the Pharisees developed through their sectarian debates with the Sadducees; then, they developed through internal, non-sectarian debates over the law as an adaptation to life without the Temple, and life in exile, and eventually, to a more limited degree, life in conflict with Christianity. These shifts mark the transformation of Pharisaic to Rabbinic Judaism.

No single tractate of the key rabbinic texts, the Mishnah and the Talmud, is devoted to theological issues; these texts are concerned primarily with interpretations of Jewish law, and anecdotes about the sages and their values. Only one chapter of the Mishnah deals with theological issues; it asserts that three kinds of people will have no share in "the world to come:" those who deny the resurrection of the dead, those who deny the divinity of the Torah, and Epicureans (who deny divine supervision of human affairs). Another passage suggests a different set of core principles: normally, a Jew may violate any law to save a life, but in Sanhedrin 74a, a ruling orders Jews to accept martyrdom rather than violate the laws against idolatry, murder, or adultery. (Judah ha-Nasi, however, said that Jews must "be meticulous in small religious duties as well as large ones, because you do not know what sort of reward is coming for any of the religious duties", suggesting that all laws are of equal importance).

=== Monotheism ===
One belief central to the Pharisees which was shared by all Jews of the time is monotheism. This is evident in the practice of reciting the Shema, a prayer composed of select verses from the Torah (Deuteronomy 6:4), at the Temple and in synagogues; the Shema begins with the verses, "Hear O Israel, the Lord is our God; the Lord is one." According to the Mishna, these passages were recited in the Temple, along with the twice-daily Tamid offering; Jews in the diaspora, who did not have access to the Temple, recited these passages in their houses of assembly. According to the Mishnah and Talmud, the men of the Great Assembly instituted the requirement that Jews both in Judea and in the diaspora pray three times per day (morning, afternoon, and evening), and include in their prayers a recitation of these passages in the morning (Shacharit) and evening (Ma'ariv) prayers.

=== Wisdom ===
Pharisaic wisdom was compiled in one book of the Mishna, Pirkei Avot. The Pharisaic attitude is perhaps best exemplified by a story about the sages Hillel the Elder and Shammai, who both lived in the latter half of the 1st century BC. A gentile once challenged Shammai to teach him the wisdom of the Torah while he stood on one foot. Shammai drove him away. The same gentile approached Hillel and asked of him the same thing. Hillel chastised him gently by saying, "That which is hateful to you do not do to another; that is the entire Torah, and the rest is its interpretation. Go study."

=== Free will and predestination ===
According to Josephus, whereas the Sadducees believed that people have total free will and the Essenes believed that all of a person's life is predestined, the Pharisees believed that people have free will, but that God also has foreknowledge of human destiny. This also accords with the statement in Pirkei Avot 3:19, "Rabbi Akiva said: All is foreseen, but freedom of choice is given."

=== Afterlife ===
Unlike the Sadducees, who are generally held to have rejected any existence after death, the sources vary on the beliefs of the Pharisees on the afterlife. According to the New Testament, the Pharisees believed in the resurrection of the dead. According to Josephus, the Pharisees held that only the soul was immortal, and the souls of good people would be resurrected or reincarnated and "pass into other bodies", while "the souls of the wicked will suffer eternal punishment" in a realm below the earth. Paul the Apostle declared himself to be a Pharisee, even after his belief in Jesus.

On the basis of the information in Josephus and that in the New Testament, theologian and scholar of religion David Bentley Hart interprets Pharisees as believing that the souls of righteous men would be "resurrected" by being sent into ethereal bodies, like those of the angels, the spirits or the stars in the heavens. Hart claims that the Apostle Paul and the first century Christians also had that same understanding of the resurrection.

== Practices ==
=== A kingdom of priests ===
Fundamentally, the Pharisees continued a form of Judaism that extended beyond the Temple, applying Jewish law to mundane activities in order to sanctify the everyday world. This was monumental as a practice during this era, as it helped the Jews of the time to truly align themselves with the law, applying even to the mundanities of life. This was a more participatory (or "democratic") form of Judaism, in which rituals were not monopolized by an inherited priesthood, but rather could be performed by all adult Jews individually or collectively, whose leaders were not determined by birth but by scholarly achievement.

Many, including some scholars, have characterized the Sadducees as a sect that interpreted the Torah literally, and the Pharisees as interpreting the Torah liberally. R' Yitzhak Isaac Halevi suggests that this was not, in fact, a matter of religion. He claims that the complete rejection of Judaism would not have been tolerated under the Hasmonean rule, and therefore Hellenists maintained that they were rejecting not Judaism but Rabbinic law. Thus, the Sadducees were in fact a political party, not a religious sect. However, according to Neusner, this view is a distortion. He suggests that two things fundamentally distinguished the Pharisaic from the Sadducean approach to the Torah. First, Pharisees believed in a broad and literal interpretation of Exodus (19:3–6), "you shall be my own possession among all peoples; for all the earth is mine, and you shall be to me a kingdom of priests and a holy nation," and the words of 2 Maccabees (2:17): "God gave all the people the heritage, the kingdom, the priesthood, and the holiness."

The Pharisees believed that the idea that all of the children of Israel were to be like priests was expressed elsewhere in the Torah, for example, when the Law was transferred from the sphere of the priesthood to every man in Israel. Moreover, the Torah already provided ways for all Jews to lead a priestly life: the laws of kosher animals were perhaps intended originally for the priests, but were extended to the whole people; similarly, the prohibition of cutting the flesh in mourning for the dead. The Pharisees believed that all Jews in their ordinary life, and not just the Temple priesthood or Jews visiting the Temple, should observe rules and rituals concerning purification.

=== Oral Torah ===
The standard view is that the Pharisees differed from Sadducees in the sense that they accepted the Oral Torah in addition to the Scripture. Theology professor Anthony J. Saldarini argued that this assumption has neither implicit nor explicit evidence. A critique of the ancient interpretations of the Bible are distant from what modern scholars consider literal. Saldarini stated that the Oral Torah did not come about until the 3rd century AD, although there was an unstated idea about it in existence. In a way, every Jewish community possessed their own version of the Oral Torah which governed their religious practices. Josephus states that the Sadducees only followed literal interpretations of the Torah. To Saldarini, this only meant that the Sadducees followed their own way of Judaism, and rejected the Pharisaic version of Judaism. To Rosemary Ruether, the Pharisaic proclamation of the Oral Torah was their way of freeing Judaism from the clutches of Aaronite priesthood, represented by the Sadducees. The Oral Torah was to remain oral but was later given a written form. It did not refer to the Torah in a status as a commentary, rather had its own separate existence which allowed Pharisaic innovations.

The sages of the Talmud believed that the Oral law was simultaneously revealed to Moses at Mount Sinai, and the product of debates among rabbis. Thus, one may conceive of the "Oral Torah" as both based on the fixed text and as an ongoing process of analysis and argument in which God is actively involved; it was this ongoing process that was revealed at Mount Sinai along with the scripture, and by participating in this ongoing process rabbis and their students are actively participating in God's ongoing act of revelation.

As Neusner explains, the schools of the Pharisees and rabbis were and are holy:

"...because there men achieve sainthood through study of Torah and imitation of the conduct of the masters. In doing so, they conform to the heavenly paradigm, the Torah believed to have been created by God "in his image," revealed at Sinai, and handed down to their own teachers ... If the masters and disciples obey the divine teaching of Moses, "our rabbi," then their society, the school, replicates on earth the heavenly academy, just as the disciple incarnates the heavenly model of Moses, "our rabbi." The rabbis believe that Moses was (and the Messiah will be) a rabbi, God dons phylacteries, and the heavenly court studies Torah precisely as does the earthly one, even arguing about the same questions. These beliefs today may seem as projections of rabbinical values onto heaven, but the rabbis believe that they themselves are projections of heavenly values onto earth. The rabbis thus conceive that on earth they study Torah just as God, the angels, and Moses, "our rabbi," do in heaven. The heavenly schoolmen are even aware of Babylonian scholastic discussions, so they require a rabbi's information about an aspect of purity taboos.

The commitment to relate religion to daily life through the law has led some (notably, Saint Paul and Martin Luther) to infer that the Pharisees were more legalistic than other sects in the Second Temple Era. The authors of the Gospels present Jesus as speaking harshly against some Pharisees (Josephus does claim that the Pharisees were the "strictest" observers of the law). Yet, as Neusner has observed, Pharisaism was but one of many "Judaisms" in its day, and its legal interpretation are what set it apart from the other sects of Judaism.

=== Innovators or preservers ===
The Mishna in the beginning of Avot and (in more detail) Maimonides in his Introduction to Mishneh Torah records a chain of tradition (mesorah) from Moses at Mount Sinai down to R' Ashi, redactor of the Talmud and last of the Amoraim. This chain of tradition includes the interpretation of unclear statements in the Bible (e.g. that the "fruit of a beautiful tree" refers to a citron as opposed to any other fruit), the methods of textual exegesis (the disagreements recorded in the Mishna and Talmud generally focus on methods of exegesis), and Laws with Mosaic authority that cannot be derived from the Biblical text (these include measurements (e.g. what amount of a non-kosher food must one eat to be liable), the amount and order of the scrolls to be placed in the phylacteries, etc.).

The Pharisees were also innovators in that they enacted specific laws as they saw necessary according to the needs of the time. These included prohibitions to prevent an infringement of a biblical prohibition (e.g. one does not take a Lulav on Shabbat "Lest one carry it in the public domain") called gezeirot, among others. The commandment to read the Megillah (Book of Esther) on Purim and to light the Menorah on Hanukkah are Rabbinic innovations. Much of the legal system is based on "what the sages constructed via logical reasoning and from established practice". Also, the blessings before meals and the wording of the Amidah. These are known as Takanot. The Pharisees based their authority to innovate on the verses: "....according to the word they tell you... according to all they instruct you. According to the law they instruct you and according to the judgment they say to you, you shall do; you shall not divert from the word they tell you, either right or left" (Deuteronomy 17:10–11) (see Encyclopedia Talmudit entry "Divrei Soferim").

In an interesting twist, Abraham Geiger posits that the Sadducees were the more hidebound adherents to an ancient Halacha whereas the Pharisees were more willing to develop Halacha as the times required. See however, Bernard Revel's "Karaite Halacha" which rejects many of Geiger's proofs.

=== Significance of debate and study of the law ===
Just as important as (if not more important than) any particular law was the value the rabbis placed on legal study and debate. The sages of the Talmud believed that when they taught the Oral Torah to their students, they were imitating Moses, who taught the law to the children of Israel. Moreover, the rabbis believed that "the heavenly court studies Torah precisely as does the earthly one, even arguing about the same questions." Thus, in debating and disagreeing over the meaning of the Torah or how best to put it into practice, no rabbi felt that he (or his opponent) was rejecting God or threatening Judaism; on the contrary, it was precisely through such arguments that the rabbis imitated and honored God.

One sign of the Pharisaic emphasis on debate and differences of opinion is that the Mishnah and Talmud mark different generations of scholars in terms of different pairs of contending schools. In the first century, for example, the two major Pharisaic schools were those of Hillel and Shammai. After Hillel died in 10 AD, Shammai assumed the office of president of the Sanhedrin until he died in 30 AD. Followers of these two sages dominated scholarly debate over the following decades. Although the Talmud records the arguments and positions of the school of Shammai, the teachings of the school of Hillel were ultimately taken as authoritative.

== Relations with Christianity ==
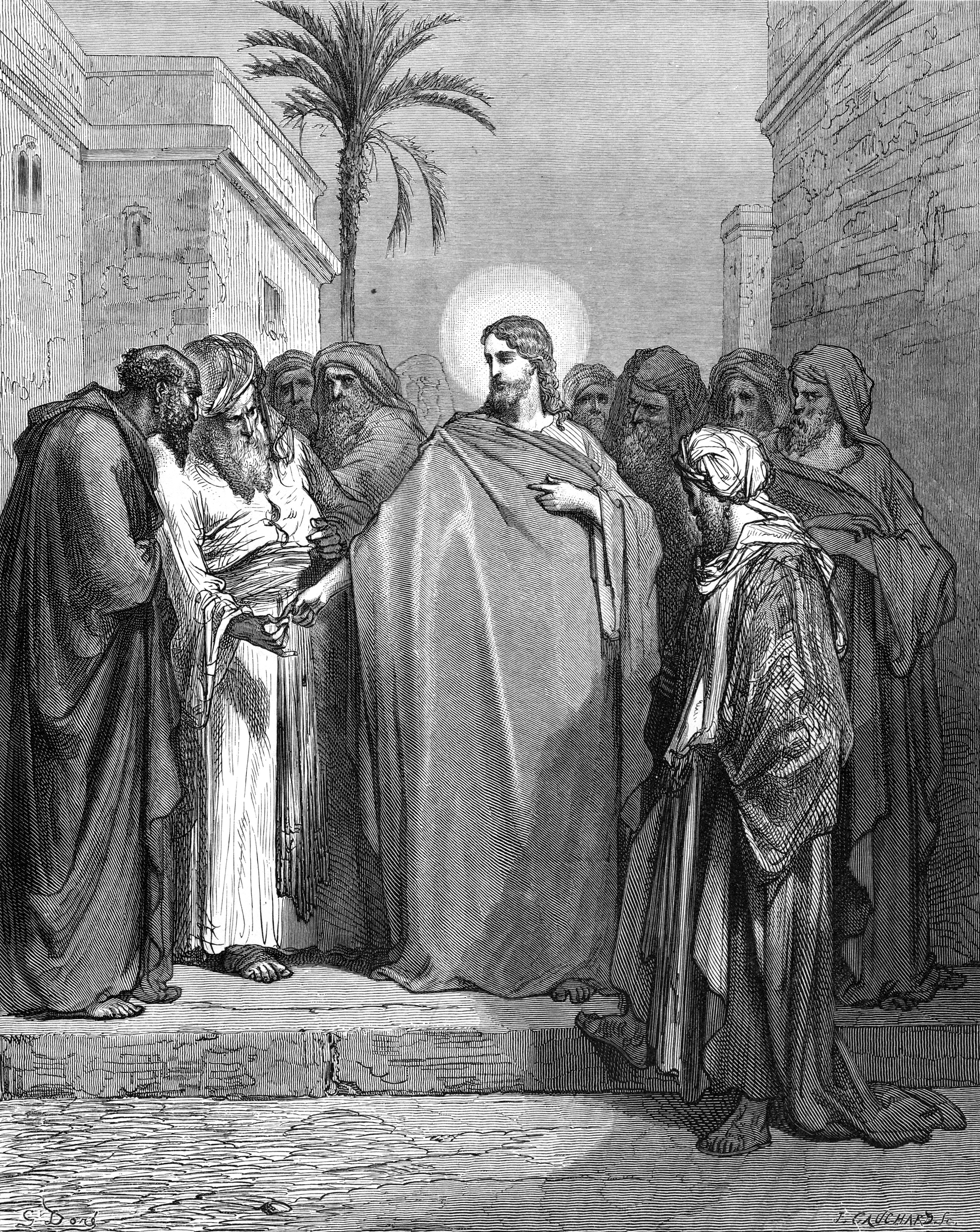
Gustave Doré: Disputation between Jesus and the Pharisees

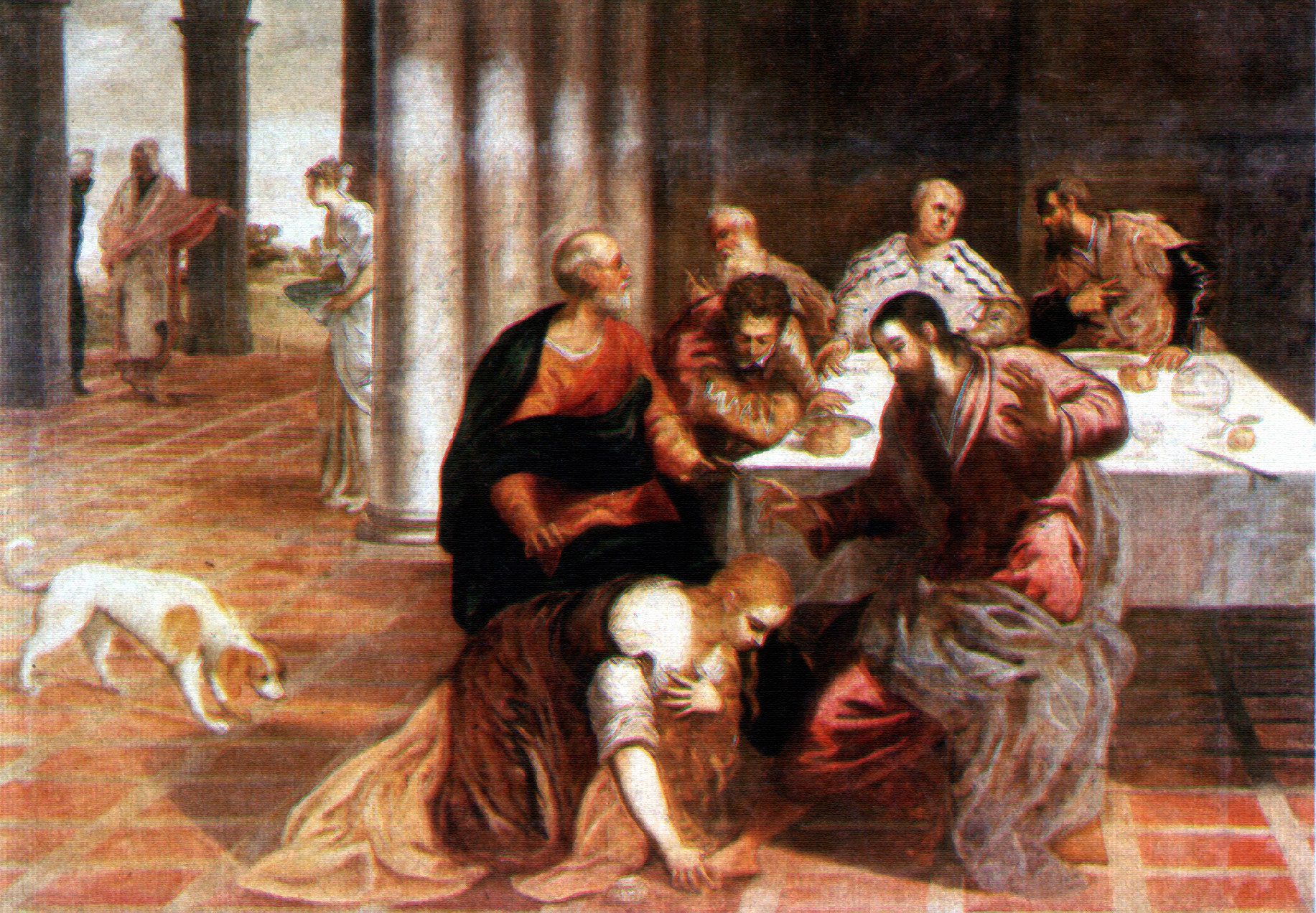
Jesus at the house of the Pharisean, by Tintoretto, Escorial

The Pharisees appear in the New Testament, engaging in conflicts with John the Baptist and with Jesus, and because Nicodemus the Pharisee (John 3:1) with Joseph of Arimathea entombed Jesus' body at great personal risk. Gamaliel, the highly respected rabbi and, according to Christianity, defender of the apostles, was also a Pharisee, and according to some Christian traditions secretly converted to Christianity.

There are several references in the New Testament to Paul the Apostle being a Pharisee who violently persecuted Christians — including Stephen the protomartyr — before converting to Christianity, and other members of the Pharisee sect are known from Acts 15:5 to have become Christian believers. It was some members of his group who argued that gentile converts must be circumcised and obliged to follow the Mosaic law, leading to a dispute within the early Church addressed at the Apostolic Council in Jerusalem in 50 CE.

The New Testament, particularly the Synoptic Gospels, presents especially the leadership of the Pharisees as fixated on man-made rules (especially concerning purity). Jesus criticizes the ritual observance of these rules in pursuit of acclaim or at the expense of helping needy people as hypocritical. At one point he uses the example of the laws pertaining to cleaning drinking vessels from the outside first as a metaphor, suggesting that a total focus on ritual observance leaves the interior spirit uncleaned. (The Gospel of John, which is the only gospel where Nicodemus is mentioned, particularly portrays the sect as divided and willing to debate.)

Because of the New Testament's frequent depictions of Pharisees as self-righteous rule-followers (see also Woes of the Pharisees and Legalism), the word "pharisee" (and its derivatives: "pharisaical", etc.) has come into semi-popular usage in English to describe a hypocritical and arrogant person who places the letter of the law above its spirit. Modern-day Jews generally find this usage insulting, and some consider this use of the word to be implicitly antisemitic.

Hyam Maccoby speculates that Jesus was a Pharisee and that his arguments with Pharisees is a sign of inclusion rather than fundamental conflict (disputation being the dominant narrative mode employed in the Talmud as a search for truth, and not necessarily a sign of opposition). However, Maccoby's views have been widely rejected by scholars.

Examples of passages include the story of Jesus declaring the sins of a paralytic man forgiven and the Pharisees calling the action blasphemy. In the story, Jesus counters the accusation that he does not have the power to forgive sins by pronouncing forgiveness of sins and then healing the man. The account of the Paralytic Man and Jesus's performance of miracles on the Sabbath are often interpreted as oppositional and at times antagonistic to that of the Pharisees' teachings.

However, according to E. P. Sanders, Jesus' actions are actually similar to and consistent with Jewish beliefs and practices of the time, as recorded by the rabbis, that commonly associate illness with sin and healing with forgiveness. Jews (according to Sanders) reject the New Testament suggestion that the healing would have been critical of, or criticized by, the Pharisees as no surviving rabbinic source questions or criticizes this practice, and the notion that Pharisees believed that "God alone" could forgive sins is more of a rhetorical device than historical fact. Another argument from Sanders is that, according to the New Testament, Pharisees wanted to punish Jesus for healing a man's withered hand on Sabbath. Despite the Mishna and Gemara being replete with restrictions on healing on the Sabbath (for example, Mishna Shabbat, 22:6), Sanders states that no Rabbinic rule has been found according to which Jesus would have violated Sabbath.

According to Chris Keith, there have been many scholars on both sides who were either highly critical of the historicity of the controversy narratives between Jesus and the scribes and Pharisees or found the stories to be historically credible. Some of the former went as far as to claim that these narratives tried to hide the truth that Jesus in actuality was a Pharisee. Keith agrees with the latter and agrees that conflicts between Jesus and the literate interpreters of the text happened as the Gospels say and can be traced back to the historical Jesus, disputing Sanders in particular. While he acknowledges that the Gospels' stories are a "product of the time(s) in which they were formed" and were affected by later struggles between Christians and Jews, he argues that such symbolism that drapes the Gospel narratives does not mean they are not historical and that there are convincing arguments Jesus did have such debates.

Paula Frederiksen and Michael J. Cook believe that those passages of the New Testament that are seemingly most hostile to the Pharisees were written sometime after the destruction of the Temple in 70 AD. Only Christianity and Pharisaism survived the destruction of the Temple, and the two competed for a short time until the Pharisees emerged as the dominant form of Judaism. When many Jews did not convert, Christians sought converts from among the Gentiles. Some scholars have found evidence of continuous interactions between Jewish-Christian and rabbinic movements from the mid to late 2nd century to the 4th century.

== See also ==
- The Seekers after Smooth Things
- Tannaim
- Woes of the Pharisees
