= Valozhyn, Valozhyn district rural council =

Valozhyn rural council (Belarusian: Валожынскі сельсавет; Russian: Воложинский сельсовет) is a lower-level subdivision (selsoviet) of Valozhyn district, Minsk region, Belarus. Its administrative center is the city of Valozhyn.
