= Iwieniec Uprising =

1943 Polish uprising in German-occupied Belarus

- Part of Polish resistance movement in World War II
Date	19 June 1943
Location	Iwieniec, Reichskommissariat Ostland (now Ivyanets, Belarus)
Result	Polish victory

Belligerents
Polish resistance	Nazi Germany

Commanders and leaders
Kacper Miłaszewski; Walenty Parchimowicz; Olgierd Woyno	Karl Cavill

Casualties and losses
2 killed 2 wounded	approx. 150 killed

The Iwieniec Uprising was an attack carried out by units of the Polish anti-German resistance, the Home Army (Armia Krajowa, AK) against a German garrison in the town of Iwieniec in German-occupied Poland (today Ivyanets, Belarus) on 19 June 1943. The action was carried out by the Polish Partisan Unit AK Stołpce Region.

The purpose of the attack was to free imprisoned members of the Polish underground, capture weapons and provisions from the Germans, capture and punish Nazi-collaborators, pre-empt a German conscription of local men for forced labor in Nazi Germany, and to demonstrate the significance of the Polish underground in the region.

The Polish units suffered four casualties (two killed, two wounded) while killing approximately 150 German soldiers and policemen. Between 100 and 200 Belarusian Auxiliary policemen deserted during the attack, switched side to the Poles and ended up joining the Polish partisans. While the attacks was a success (although some of the collaborators sought by the partisans managed to escape), it invited severe reprisals from the Germans. Around 150 civilians were murdered in reprisals for the uprising. In July 1943 the Germans launched the major anti-partisan Operation Hermann against all the partisan units (Polish as well as Soviet) in the nearby Naliboki forest, during which civilian communities were destroyed, the fit deported as slave labor and the unfit murdered by the Germans.

The attack was one of the major operations carried out by the Home Army in Poland prior to the Warsaw Uprising.
