= Harodzki rural council =

Harodzki rural council (Belarusian: Гародзькаўскі сельсавет; Russian: Городьковский сельсовет) is a lower-level subdivision (selsoviet) of Valozhyn district, Minsk region, Belarus. Its administrative center is Harodzki.
