= Pyarshai rural council =

Pyarshai rural council (Belarusian: Пяршайскі сельсавет; Russian: Першайский сельсовет) is a lower-level subdivision (selsoviet) of Valozhyn district, Minsk region, Belarus. Its administrative center is Pyarshai.
