= Dory rural council =

Dory rural council (Belarusian: Дорскі сельсавет; Russian: Дорский сельсовет) is a lower-level subdivision (selsoviet) of Valozhyn district, Minsk region, Belarus. Its administrative center is Dory.
