= Hermann Stępień =

Polish Roman Catholic priest and martyr

Blessed Hermann Stępień OFM Conv.
- Hermann Stepien in 1938
- Born: Karol Stępień; 21 October 1910; Łódź, Poland
- Died: 19 July 1943 (aged 32); Borowikowszczyzna, Poland
- Other name: Hermann Stepien
- Occupation: Priest

Karol Hermann Stępień, OFM Conv. (21 October 1910 – 19 July 1943) was a Polish Conventual Franciscan priest who was martyred by the Nazis doing World War II.

== Early life ==
Karol Stępień was born into a poor family on 21 October 1910, in Łódź, Poland.

Stępień was educated in Łódź. He attended the Franciscan seminary in Lviv, graduating in 1929. He then attended the Pontifical University of St. Bonaventure in Rome. He was ordained as a Franciscan priest in 1937 in Rome, taking the religious name "Hermann". Stępień returned to Poland, where he earned a Master's degree in Theology from Lviv University.

== Vocation ==
Stępień served as a Francisco priest in Radomsko and Vilnius. In 1940, he was asked by Bishop Kazimierz Bukraba of the Roman Catholic Diocese of Pinsk to go to Piaršai to help their parish priest, Achille Puchala.

When the Nazis invaded in 1943, Stępień decided to stay and keep preaching. He declared: "Pastors cannot leave the believers!"

== Death ==
On 19 July 1943, the Nazis took Stępień, Puchala and their parishioners to a barn in Borowikowszczyzna (today Borovikovshchina in Valozhyn District, Belarus), which they set on fire, thus murdering them all together.

== Legacy ==
Stępień was beatified by Pope John Paul II on 13 June 1999, in Warsaw, Poland.
