= Philip Faber =

Italian Franciscan theologian (1564–1630)

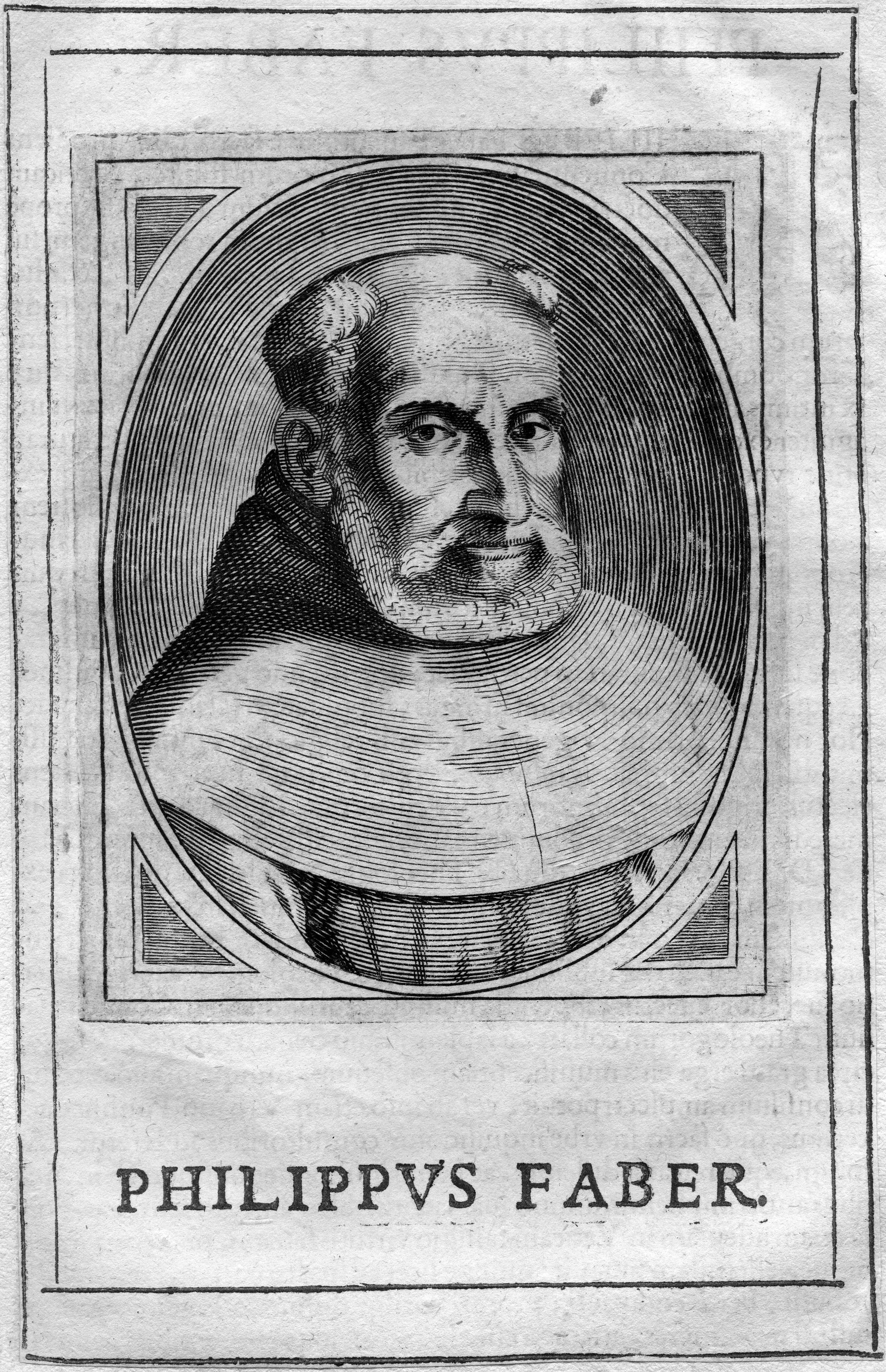
Philip Faber

Philip Faber (Fabri) (1564, Spinata di Brisighella – Padua, 28 August 1630) was an Italian Franciscan theologian, philosopher and noted commentator on Duns Scotus.

== Life ==
In 1582 he entered the Order of St. Francis (Conventuals), at Cremona. After completing his studies, he taught in various monastic schools till he was appointed professor of philosophy in 1603, and in 1606 professor of theology, at the University of Padua, where he was highly successful as a lecturer.

In 1625 he was elected provincial of the order, and he again took up his work as professor, expounding the teachings of Duns Scotus, abandoning the superlative style of other commentators.

== Works ==
His most important works are:

- Philosophia naturalis Scoti in theoremata distributa (Parma, 1601, revised at Venice, 1606, 1616, 1622, and at Paris, 1622).
- Commentaria in quatuor libros sententiarum Duns Scoti (Venice, 1613; 3rd ed. Paris, 1622);
- De Praedestinatione (Venice, 1623), a complement to the first book of the Sentences;
- De restitutione, et extrema unctione (Venice, 1624), an addition to the fourth book of the Sentences;
- A treatise De Sacramento Ordinis, poenis et censuris ecclesiasticis (Venice, 1628).

His work, "De Primatu Petri et Romani Pontificis" and his "Commentaries on the Metaphysics of Aristotle" were published, after Faber's death, by his friend Matthew Ferchius, who prefaced the "Commentaries", with a biography of the author.
