= Bartolomeo Meduna =

Franciscan scholar

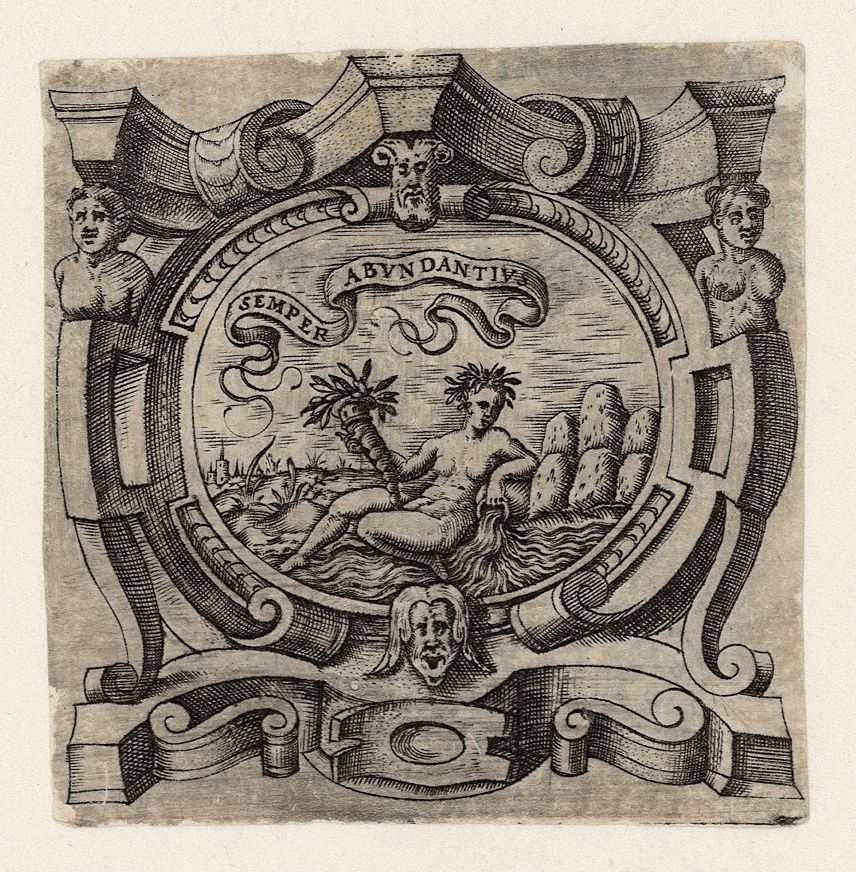
Emblem of Bartolomeo Meduna, engraving by Girolamo Porro

Bartolomeo Meduna (mid-16th century – 15 November 1618), R.P.M. (reverendo padre maestro) was an Italian Franciscan of the Order of Friars Minor Conventual, scholar, teacher and author.

== Biography ==
A descendant of the Pordenone branch of the noble Meduna family, he was born in the mid-sixteenth century in Motta di Livenza, in the Treviso area.

He was the son of presbyter Giovanni Battista, son of Domenico Meduna, who was appointed by Bishop Michele della Torre and placed in possession of the church of San Giacomo in Brugnera, invested by the Bishop of Concordia Pietro Querini (on the orders of the Roman Curia) as parish priest and vicar of the church of San Pietro in Azzano, vicar of the cathedral of San Marco in Pordenone, and rector of the church of San Giovanni in San Quirino until 16 June 1605.

His brothers were Francesco Meduna, a physician ("performs miraculous works in medical matters"), and the younger Alessandro Meduna (possibly a nephew), who followed Bartolomeo's education and profession as Custos (since 1617) and as Guardian (since 1626) of the Convent of Udine. He was professor of theology and was elected Provincial Minister of his Order's Province of Sant'Antonio at the chapter held in Montagnana in 1636. Alessandro died on 17 April 1644.

Bartolomeo Meduna completed his religious education at the Conventual Franciscans with a Magisterium, served as Guardian of the Convent of Santa Maria delle Grazie in Motta, twice as Custos of the Convents of Friuli (in 1594 and 1595) and as Guardian of the Convent of Udine (in 1604 and 1605). His works suggest that he also lived in Padua and Venice.

He is most notable as the author of two operettas in Italian: On the life of the Blessed Virgin and the Humanity of Jesus Christ (1572) and Lo Scolare (1588), presented to Cardinal Alessandro Peretti di Montalto, great-nephew of Pope Sixtus V.

He also authored the short Dialogue concerning the Miraculous Victory obtained by the Army of the Holy Christian League, against the Turks (1572), celebrating the Battle of Lepanto and dedicated to the Bishop of Treviso Giorgio Cornaro.

He is mentioned as "reconstructor" of the castello di Meduna, coinciding with the construction of the palazzo Michiel-Loredan on the site of the original castle towards the end of the 16th century.

Bartolomeo Meduna died on 15 November 1618.
