= Scalimoli =

Scalimoli was a Franciscan friar and Catholic theologian, better known by his religious name, Andrea di Castellana, from his place of origin in Apulia, southern Italy.

== Biography ==
He entered the Order of the Conventual Franciscans in the Province of St. Nicholas (Bari), of which he was later appointed provincial superior. His experience as a missionary in Moldavia, Wallachia and Transylvania (all in present Romania), as Prefect Apostolic of Hungary and as visitor general of the Franciscan missions in Russia led him to the composition of a work which was approved by the general of the order in 1642 and is dedicated to Cardinal Barberini, entitled Missionarius apostolicus a Sacra Congregatione de Propaganda Fide instructus quomodo debeat inter haereticos vivere, pravitates eorum convincere, et in fide catholica proficere per Germaniam, Poloniam, Ungariam, et per omnes partes ubi vigent blasphemiae lutheranae (loosely translated, Catholic Missionary Guide for Life and Work to Convert in Germany, Poland, Hungary and Lutherans Elsewhere) (Bologna, 1644).
