= Bartholomew Mastrius =

Italian philosopher and theologian (1602–1673)

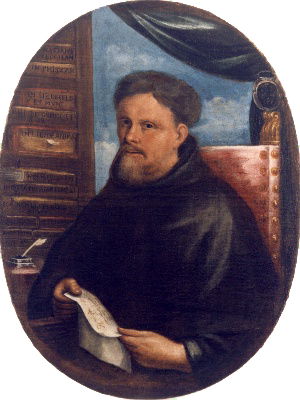
fra Bartolomeo Mastri

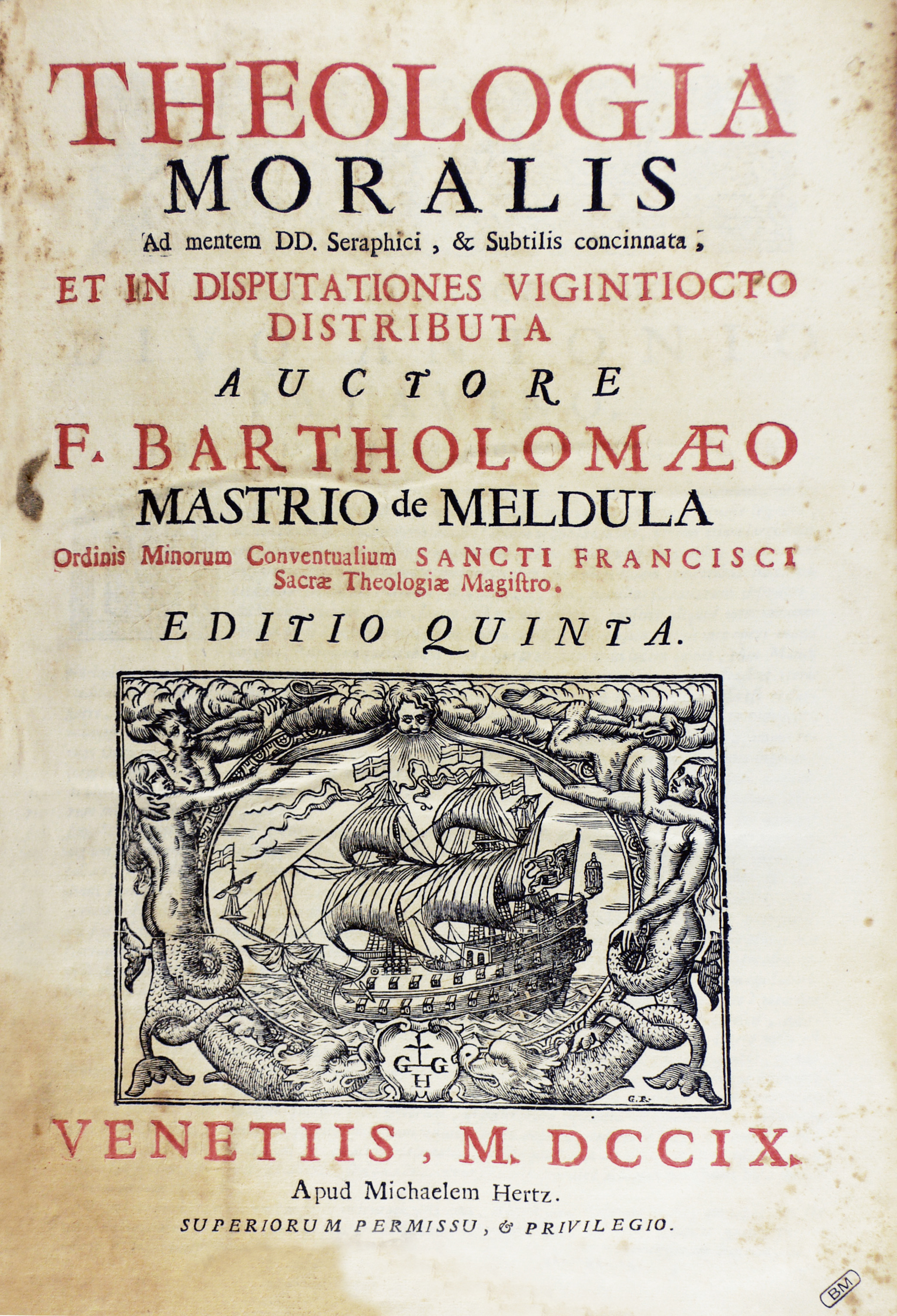
Theologia moralis, 1709

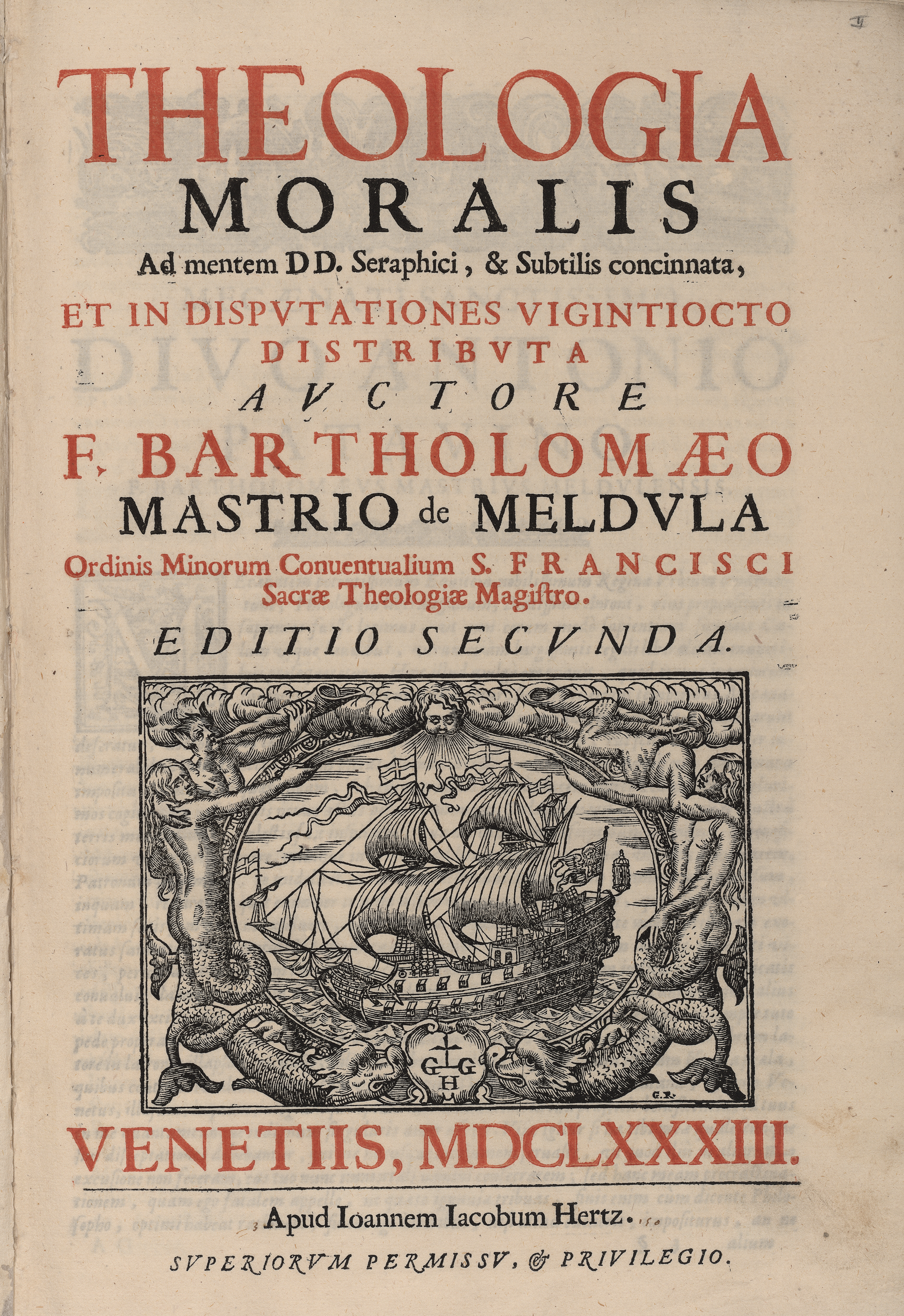
Theologia moralis, 1683

Bartholomew Mastrius O.F.M. Conv. (Latin: Bartholomaeus Mastrius; Italian: Bartolomeo Mastri; Meldola, near Forlì, 7 December 1602 – Meldola, 11 January 1673) was an Italian Conventual Franciscan philosopher and theologian.

== Life ==
Born at Meldola, near Forlì, in 1602, he received his early education at Cesena and took degrees at the University of Bologna. He also frequented the 'studia' of his religious order in Padua and Rome before assuming the duties of a lecturer in Cesena, Perugia and Padua.

He acquired a profound knowledge of scholastic philosophy and theology, being deeply versed in the writings of Duns Scotus. Nevertheless, he was an open-minded and independent scholar. As a controversialist he was harsh and arrogant towards his opponents, mingling invective with his arguments. His opinions on some philosophical questions were fiercely combatted by many of his contemporaries and especially by Matthew Ferchi and the Irish Franciscan John Punch. Mastrius particularly objected to Punch's methodology, arguing that neither his conclusions nor his argumentation were faithful to Scotus.

When presenting the second volume of his work on the "Sentences" to Alexander VII, to whom he had dedicated it, the pope asked him where he had learned to treat his opponent Ferchi in such a rough manner: Mastrius answered, "From St. Augustine and St. Jerome, who in defence of their respective opinions on the interpretation of Holy Scripture fought hard and not without reason". The pope smilingly remarked, "From such masters other things could be learned".

Mastrius had a well-ordered intellect which is seen in the clearness and precision with which he sets forth the subject-matter of discussion. His arguments for and against a proposition show real critical power and are expressed in accurate and clear language. His numerous quotations from ancient and contemporary authors and various schools of thought are a proof of his extensive reading. His works shed light on some of the difficult questions in Scotistic philosophy and theology.

In 2002, to celebrate the fourth centenary of his birth, an international conference was held in Meldola, Mastri’s native town (near Forlì), devoted to his philosophical thought.

== Works ==
He was one of the most prominent writers of his time on philosophy and theology. His "Philosophy" in five volumes folio, his "Commentaries" on the "Sentences" in four volumes, and his Moral Theology "ad mentem S. Bonaventurae" in one volume were all published in Venice.

He edited a highly prized Philosophia ad mentem Scoti, and wrote a celebrated Disputationes Theologicae (many editions) and Theologia ad mentem Scoti (1671).

== Sources ==
- Crowley, Bonaventure (1948). "The Life and Works of Bartholomew Mastrius, O.F.M. Conv. 1602-1673". Franciscan Studies. 8 (2): 97–152. doi:10.1353/frc.1948.0011. JSTOR 41974294. S2CID 201779558.
- Claus A. Andersen, Metaphysik im Barockscotismus. Untersuchungen zum Metaphysikwerk des Bartholomaeus Mastrius. Mit Dokumentation der Metaphysik in der scotistischen Tradition ca. 1620-1750, Benjamins (Bochumer Studien zur Philosophie 57), Amsterdam / Philadelphia 2016.
- Marco Forlivesi, Scotistarum princeps. Bartolomeo Mastri (1602–1673) e il suo tempo, Padova 2002.
- Marco Forlivesi (ed.), "Rem in seipsa cernere". Saggi sul pensiero filosofico di Bartolomeo Mastri (1602–1673), Padova 2006.
- Daniel Heider, Universals in Second Scholasticism. A comparative study with focus on the theories of Francisco Suárez S.J. (1548-1617), João Poinsot O.P. (1589-1644) and Bartolomeo Mastri da Meldola O.F.M. Conv. (1602-1673)/Bonaventura Belluto O.F.M. Conv. (1600-1676), Philadelphia, John Benjamins, 2014.
