= Matthew Ferchi =

Croatian Franciscan Conventual scholastic philosopher (1583–1669)

Matija Ferkić or Matija Frkić (Italian: Matteo Ferchi, English: Matthew Ferchi (Ferkich); 1583 – 1669) was a Croatian Franciscan Conventual scholastic philosopher from Krk.

He was from the island of Krk (Italian: Veglia). He was a Scotist, and wrote a Vita et apologia Scoti, a life of Duns Scotus. He taught at the University of Padua for 35 years, from 1629.

He published the works of Philip Faber.

== Works ==
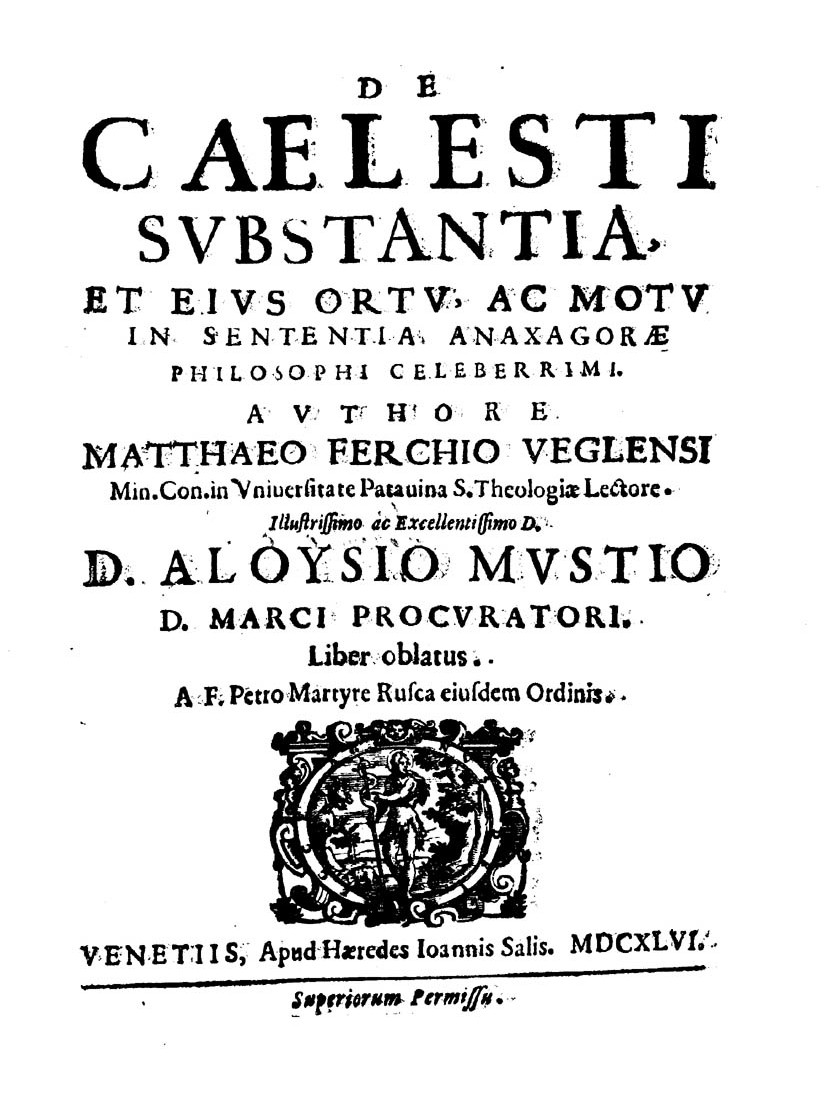
De caelesti substantia et eius ortu ac motu in sententia Anaxagorae celeberrimi philosophi, 1646.

- Apologiae pro Ioanne Duns Scoto doctore subtili libri tres : in Ioannem Fridericum Matenesium, in Abrahamum Bzouium Polonum, in Paulum Iouium Nouocomensem, Bologna, typ. Sebastiano Bonomii, 1620.
- Vita Ioannis Dunsii Scoti, Bologna, typis N. Tebaldini, 1622; Napoli, typ. Giandomenico Roncalioli, 1629.
- Istri seu Danubii ortus aliorumque fluminum ab Aristotele in primo Meteoro inductorum. Accessit Lacus Asphaltitis confirmatio, Padova, ex typ. B. Carectoni, 1632.
- Vestigationes peripateticae, Padova, typ. P. Frambotti, 1639.
- De Fabulis palaestini stagni ad aures Aristotelis, peripateticorum principis, Padova, typ. Giambattista Pasquati, 1641.
- Osservationi sopra il Goffredo del signor Torquato Tasso, Padova, typ. Giambattista Pasquati, 1642.
- De Personis producentibus Spiritum Sanctum, Padova, 1644 [?].
- Ferkić, Matija (1646). "De caelesti substantia et eius ortu ac motu in sententia Anaxagorae philosophi celeberrimi" (in Latin). Venetiis. Giovanni Salis.
- Defensio vestigationum peripateticorum ab offensionibus Belluti et Mastrii, Padova, typ. Giambattista Pasquati, 1646.
- Epitome theologicum M.F. Veglensis ... ex Magistro Sententiarum [i.e. Petrus Lombardus] et ... Jo. [Duns] Scoto, a M.P.M. Rusca ... evulgatum, 4 vol., Padova, 1647.
- Oratio in Ioannem Dunsium Scotum Doctorem Subtilem declamata in Universitate Patavina die tertia novembris 1634, ed. Antonino Poppi, "La santità di Giovanni Duns Scoto nel solco di Francesco d'Assisi e Antonio di Padova", Il Santo. Rivista antoniana di storia, dottrina, arte 33/1 (1993), 121–133.
