= Order of Friars Minor Conventual =

Branch of the Catholic Order of Friars Minor, founded by Francis of Assisi in 1209

- Ordo Fratrum Minorum Conventualium (Latin)
- A cross, Christ's arm and Saint Francis's arm, the emblem of the all Franciscans including the Conventuals.
- Abbreviation: OFM Conv.
- Formation: 1209; 817 years ago
- Founder: St. Francis of Assisi
- Type: Mendicant Order of Pontifical Right (for Men)
- Headquarters: General Curia; Piazza SS. Apostoli, 51; Rome, Italy
- Members: 4,076 (2,803 priests; as of 2020)
- Minister General: Friar Carlos Alberto Trovarelli, O.F.M. Conv.
- Ministry: Missionary, educational, parochial works
- Website: ofmconv.net

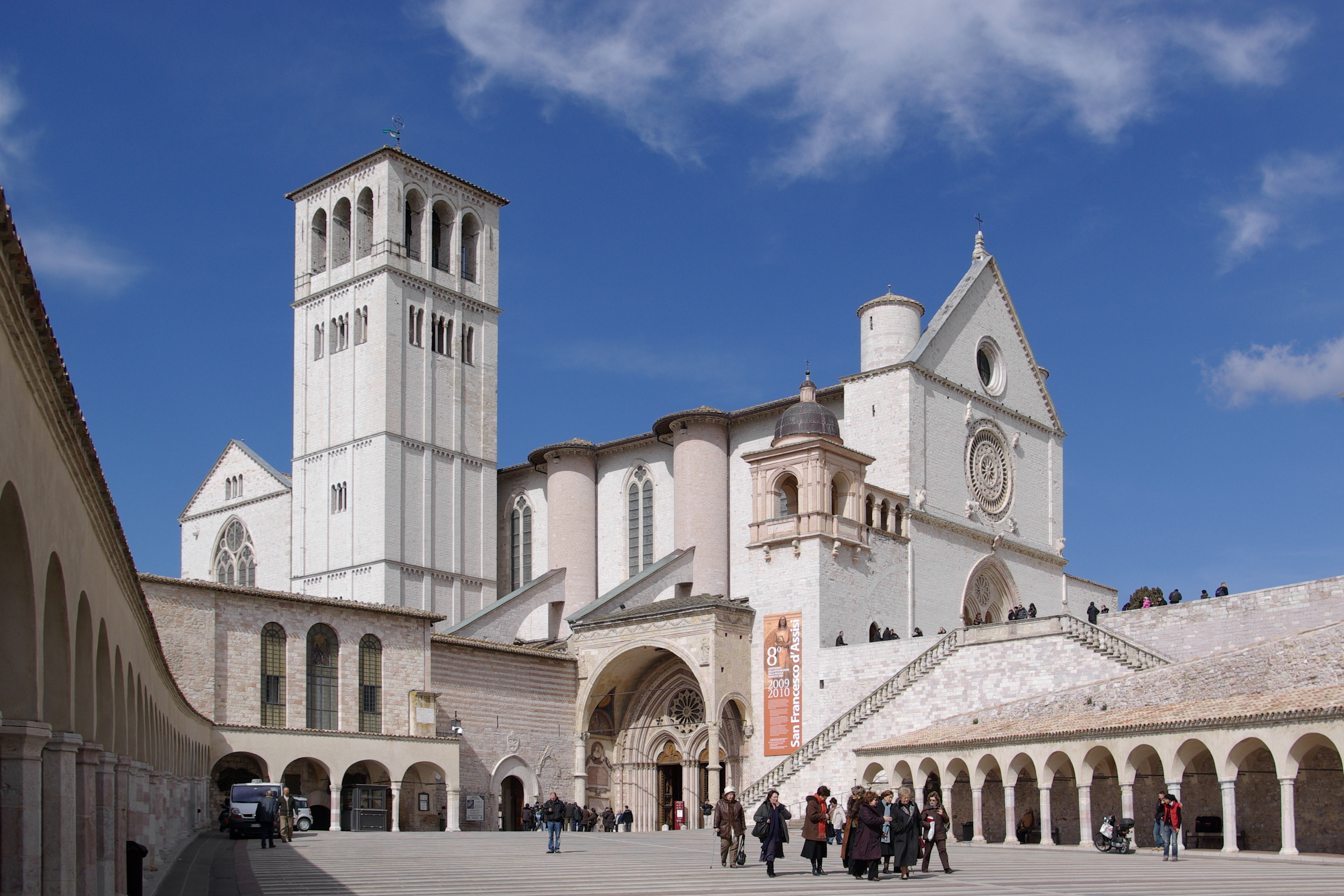
Basilica of St. Francis, Assisi, the most important church of the Order, where the saint's body is preserved.

The Order of Friars Minor Conventual (O.F.M. Conv.) is a male religious fraternity in the Catholic Church and a branch of the Franciscan Order. Conventual Franciscan Friars are identified by the affix O.F.M. Conv. after their names. They are also known as Conventual Franciscans or Minorites.

The Conventual Franciscan Friars have worldwide provinces that date to the 13th century. They dress in black or grey habits with white cords. Many friars engage in such ministries as teaching, parish ministry and service to the poor.

== Background ==
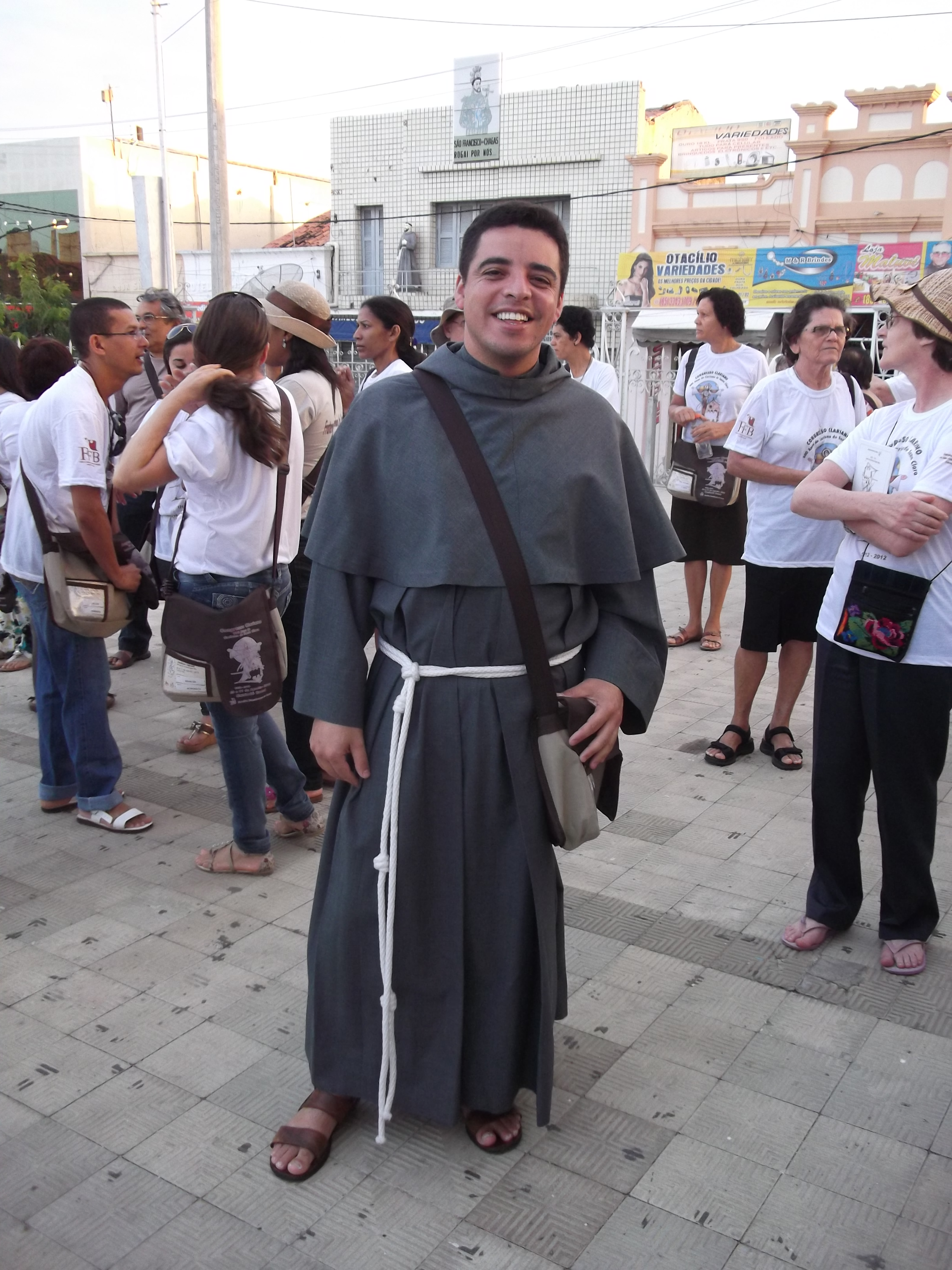
A Conventual Franciscan in Brazil

The Conventual Franciscan Friars are one of three separate fraternities that compose the First Order of St. Francis (with the Second Order consisting of the Poor Clares, and the Third Order being for secular or religious men and women).

=== Source of the name ===
There are several theories as to the source of the name "conventual".

In the Bull Cum tamquam veri of 5 April 1250, Pope Innocent IV decreed that Franciscan churches where convents existed might be called "Conventual churches".

A second theory is that the name was given to the friars living in Conventual convents.

A third view is that the Latin word conventualis was used to distinguish the friars of large convents from friars who lived solitary hermit-like lives.

Today the term "convent" in English denotes a residence for nuns; however, its original meaning meant residence for either men or women.

=== Current status ===
OFM Conv. includes 30 provinces, 18 custodies, 460 friaries and 4048 friars worldwide as of August 2018. There are four provinces in the United States. Friars serve in parishes, schools, and as chaplains for the military and for other religious orders; they serve in various types of homes and shelters, and with Catholic Relief Services. Particular characteristics of the Conventuals' tradition are community life and the urban apostolate.

The Conventuals enjoy the privilege of caring for the tomb of St. Francis at Assisi and the Basilica of St. Anthony in Padua, and they furnish the confessors to the Basilica of St. Peter in Rome.

=== Habit ===
The OFM Conv. habit consists of a tunic fastened around the waist with a thin white cord, along with a large cape which is round in front and pointed behind with a small hood attached. The color may be either black, which was adopted during the French Revolution, dark grey, or light grey which is worn by friars in East Africa.

== History ==
The original friars of OFM-Conv. sought to spread the ideals of Saint Francis throughout the new urban social order of the Middle Ages. Some friars settled in the urban slums, or the suburbs of the medieval neighbourhoods where the huts and shacks of the poorest were built outside the safety of the city walls. In London, the first settlement of the friars was set in what was called "Stinking Lane".

Since the suburbs were also the place where hospitals were set up, the friars were often commissioned by the city government to facilitate the care of the sick. The friars also helped to construct sturdier buildings, replacing the previous huts, and constructed churches. Robert Grosseteste, then Bishop of Lincoln, marvelled that the people "run to the friars for instruction as well as for confession and direction. They are transforming the world."

=== Rule of poverty ===
As the Franciscan Order became increasingly centered in larger communities (“convents”) and engaged in pastoral work there, many friars started questioning the utility of the vow of poverty. The literal and unconditional observance of poverty came to appear impracticable by the great expansion of the order, its pursuit of learning, and the accumulated property of the large cloisters in the towns. Some friars favored a relaxation in the rigor of the rule, especially as regards the observance of poverty. In contrast, other friars wanted to maintain a literal interpretation of the rule.

The "Friars of the Community" sought to take Francis's ideals to the far reaches of a universal Church. After the founder's death, they began the task of translating Francis's earthly existence into what they saw as a more socially relevant spiritual message for current and future generations. The Conventual Franciscans nestled their large group homes into small areas of land surrounded by poverty. They used their abilities to combat the hardships and injustices of the poverty-stricken areas where they settled.

After the death of Francis in 1226, his successor Brother Elias encouraged more leniency in the rule of poverty. A long dispute followed in which the “Friars of the Community”, who had adopted certain mitigations, gradually came to be called Conventuals. Friars who zealously supported strict observance were called Zelanti, and later Observants.

After the death of the Minister General, Bonaventure, in 1274, the Order grew even more divided. The Conventuals received papal dispensations, or permissions, to build their communities in the cities in order to preach the Gospel and serve the poor. The Observants followed absolute poverty and the eremitical and ascetical dimensions of Franciscanism.

=== Establishment of two fraternities ===
In 1517, Pope Leo X called a meeting of the entire Franciscan Order in Rome to end this dispute about the vow of poverty and reunite the two factions. The Observants demanded that the entire order observe the vow of poverty without any dispensation, while the Conventuals rejected any union that would require them to give up their dispensations.

Recognizing the impasse, Leo X decided to officially divide the two factions into separate fraternities:

- Leo incorporated all the Franciscan friars who wished to observe the rule of poverty without dispensation as the Friars Minor of St. Francis, also called Friars Minor of the Regular Observance. They would have precedence over the Conventuals; he moreover conferred upon the Friars Minor the right of electing Minister General of the Whole Order of Friars Minor.
- Those friars who wanted to live under dispensations were constituted a separate body with the name of Conventuals (Bulls Omnipotens Deus, 12 June 1517, and Licet Alias, 6 Dec. 1517) and given the right to elect a master general of their own, whose election, however, had to be confirmed by the Minister General of the Friars Minor. The latter appears never to have availed himself of this right, and the Conventuals may be regarded as an entirely independent order from 1517, but it was not until 1580 that they obtained a special cardinal protector of their own.

=== Constitutiones Urbanæ ===
In 1565 the Conventuals accepted the Tridentine indult allowing mendicant orders to own property corporately, and their chapter held at Florence in that year drew up statutes containing several important reforms which Pope Pius IV subsequently approved. In 1625 new constitutions were adopted by the Conventuals which superseded all preceding ones.

These constitutions, which were subsequently promulgated by Pope Urban VIII, are known as the "Constitutiones Urbanæ" and are of importance, since at their profession the Conventuals then vowed to observe the Rule of St. Francis in accordance with them, that is to say, by admitting the duly authorized dispensations therein set forth. In 1897, Pope Leo XIII reorganized the Franciscan Orders, giving each its own Minister General. The Urban Constitutions remained in force until 1932, when they were revised and replaced. A further substantive revision occurred in 1984, following the Second Vatican Council. The Constitutions were revised again in 2019, which remains the current version.

== Notable members of the order ==
=== Saints ===
- Pedro de Regalado (c. 1390 – 30 March 1456), reformer, canonized on 29 June 1746.
- John of Dukla (c. 1414 – 29 September 1484), Polish priest, canonized on 10 June 1997.
- Joseph of Cupertino (Giuseppe Desa) (17 June 1603 – 18 September 1663), mystic, canonized on 16 July 1767
- Francis Anthony Fasani (Giovanniello Fasani) (6 August 1681 – 29 November 1742), friar, canonized on 13 April 1986.
- Maximilian Maria Kolbe (Raymund Kolbe) (8 January 1894 – 14 August 1941), martyred during the Nazi Occupation of Poland, canonized on 10 October 1982

=== Blesseds ===
- Francesco Aregazzi (11 March 1375 – 6 August 1437), Bishop of Bergamo
- Alberto Berdini da Sarteano (c. 1385 – 15 August 1450), "The King of Preachers" and diplomatic envoy of Pope Eugene IV to the Coptic and Ethiopian churches, declared blessed by popular acclaim.
- Francesco Zirano (c. 1565 – 25 January 1603), martyred in Algeria, beatified on 12 October 2014.
- Bonaventure of Potenza (Carlo Antonio Gerardo Lavanga) (4 January 1651 – 26 October 1711), priest, beatified on 26 November 1775.
- Melchor (Rafal) Chyliński (8 January 1694 – 2 December 1741), priest, beatified on 9 June 1991.
- Antonio Lucci (Angelo Nicola Lucci) (2 August 1682 – 25 July 1752), Bishop of Bovino, beatified on 18 June 1989.
- Jean-François Burté (20 June 1740 – 2 September 1792), Martyr of the French Revolution, beatified on 17 October 1926.
- Jean-Baptiste Triquerie (1 July 1737 - 21 January 1794), Martyr of the French Revolution from the Diocese of Laval, beatified on 19 June 1955.
- Louis-Armand-Joseph Adam (19 December 1741 - 13 July 1794), Martyr of the French Revolution, beatified on 1 October 1995.
- Nicolas Savouret (27 February 1773 - 16 July 1794), Martyr of the French Revolution, beatified on 1 October 1995.
- Federico (Alfonso) López López and 5 Companions (died between 27 July to 6 September 1936), Martyrs of the Spanish Civil War, beatified on 11 March 2001.
- Józef Innocenty Guz (Józef Wojciech Guz) (18 March 1890 - 6 June 1940), martyred during the Nazi Occupation of Poland, beatified on 13 June 1999.
- Antonin Bajewski (Jan Eugeniusz Bajewski) (17 January 1915 – 18 May 1941), martyred during the Nazi Occupation of Poland, beatified on 13 June 1999.
- Pius Bartosik (Ludwik Bartosik) (21 August 1909 - 12 December 1941), martyred during the Nazi Occupation of Poland, beatified on 13 June 1999.
- Tymoteusz Trojanowski (Stanisław Antoni Trojanowski) (29 July 1908 - 28 February 1942), martyred during the Nazi Occupation of Poland, beatified on 13 June 1999.
- Bonifacy Żukowski (Piotr Żukowski) (13 January 1913 - 10 April 1942), martyred during the Nazi Occupation of Poland, beatified on 13 June 1999.
- Achilles Puchała (Józef Puchała) (18 March 1911 – 19 July 1943), martyred during the Nazi Occupation of Poland, beatified on 13 June 1999.
- Herman Stępień (Karol Stępień) (21 October 1910 – 19 July 1943), martyred during the Nazi Occupation of Poland, beatified on 13 June 1999.
- Carlos de Dios Murias (10 October 1945 - 18 July 1976), Martyr of La Rioja, beatified on 27 April 2019.
- Michał Tomaszek (23 September 1960 – 9 August 1991), martyred by the Shining Path Communist guerilla faction in Peru, beatified on 5 December 2015.
- Zbigniew Adam Strzałkowski (3 July 1958 – 9 August 1991), martyred by the Shining Path Communist guerilla faction in Peru, beatified on 5 December 2015.

=== Venerables ===
- Benvenuto Bambozzi (23 March 1809 - 24 March 1875), priest, declared Venerable on 11 December 1987
- Melchior Fordon (Józef Fordon) (5 August 1862 - 27 September 1927), Belarusian priest, declared Venerable on 21 December 2018.
- Luigi Lo Verde (Filippo Lo Verde) (20 December 1910 - 12 February 1932), priest, declared Venerable on 14 June 2016.
- Nicolò (Placido) Cortese (7 March 1907 – c. 3 November 1944), priest, declared Venerable on 30 August 2021.
- Giacomo Bulgaro (29 January 1879 - 27 January 1967), priest, declared Venerable on 28 November 2019.
- Quirico Pignalberi (11 July 1891 – 18 July 1982), priest, declared Venerable on 3 March 2016.
- Francesco Mazzieri (Constantino Mazzieri) (25 March 1889 - 19 August 1983), Bishop of Ndola in Zambia, declared Venerable on 9 April 2022.

=== Servants of God ===
- Francesco Cervini (3 March 1476 - 31 December 1519), priest
- Francesco Gessi di Borghetto (c. 1610 - 18 April 1673), priest
- Eliáš Iglódi (Štefan) (c. 1621 - 6 November 1639), Hungarian priest and martyr
- Kelimen Didak (c. August 1683 - 28 April 1744), Hungarian priest
- Giuseppe Maria Cesa (Flaviano Cesa) (6 October 1686 - 9 June 1744), priest
- Marco Domenico Giannecchini (14 November 1710 - 14 May 1762), priest
- Giovanni Soggiu (4 April 1883 - 12 November 1930), Apostolic Prefect of Hinganfu and martyr, declared as a Servant of God on 15 March 2002.
- Michael Jerome Cypher (2 January 1941 – 25 June 1975), martyr
- Antonio Sinibaldi (26 November 1937 - 7 September 1987), priest
- Eugeniusz (Innocenty Maria) Wójcik (30 November 1908 - 18 November 1994), Polish priest
- Martin de Porres Maria Ward (20 March 1918 – 22 June 1999)
- Egidio (Giuseppe) Merola (1 May 1906 - 6 January 2002), priest
- Anton Demeter (17 September 1925 - 20 December 2006), Romanian priest, declared as a Servant of God in 2016.
- Matteo (Gregorio) la Grua (15 February 1914 - 15 January 2012), priest

=== Popes ===
- Pope Sixtus IV (1414–1484)
- Pope Sixtus V (1521–1590)
- Pope Clement XIV (1705–1774)

=== Scholars ===
- Simon Tunsted (d. 1369)
- Nicholas of Freising (c. 14th cent.)
- Cornelio Musso (1511–1574)
- Bartolomeo Meduna (d. 1618)
- Girolamo Diruta (c. 1546~1625)
- Mario di Calasio (1550–1620)
- Philip Faber (1564–1630)
- Matthew Ferchi (1583–1669)
- Andrea di Castellana (Scalimoli) (c. 17th cent.)
- Bartholomew Mastrius (1602–1673)
- Francesco Lorenzo Brancati di Lauria (1612–1693)
- Antoine Pagi (1624–1699)
- Vincenzo Coronelli (1650–1718)
- François Pagi (1654–1721)
- Giovanni Battista Martini (1706–1784)
- Stanislao Mattei (1750–1825)
- Nicholas Papini (1751–1834)
- Maria Antonio of Vicenza (1834–1884)
- Thomas Grassmann (1890–1970)
- Celestin Tomić (1917–2006)
- Charles Madden (author of a book on Freemasonry)

== Sources ==
- Ordo Fratrum Minorum Conventualium – Conventual Franciscans
- Conventual Franciscan Friars in the United States
