= Yitzhak Isaac Halevy Rabinowitz =

Russian rabbi and Jewish historian (1847–1914)

Personal life
- Born: 21 September 1847 Iwieniec, Russia
- Died: 15 May 1914 (aged 66) Hamburg, Germany

Religious life
- Religion: Judaism

Yitzhak Isaac Halevy (Rabinowitz) (Hebrew: יצחק אייזיק הלוי; 21 September 1847 – 15 May 1914) was a rabbi, Jewish historian, and founder of the Agudath Israel organization. Relatively little of his correspondence survived the Holocaust, and so information concerning his activities is scarce. A somewhat hagiographical treatment based on discovered correspondence of Isaac Halevy is to be found in Reichel (1969), and this forms the basis for the present article.

== Biographical information ==
Isaac Halevy was born in Iwieniec (now in Minsk Region, Belarus), near Vilna into a rabbinical family. He was a grandson of Mordechai Eliezer Kovno. After his father was killed by soldiers, he was raised by his paternal grandfather. At 13, he entered the Volozhin yeshiva, where he was recognized as a talmudic prodigy. He held a number of communal positions in his early adulthood, including gabbai of the aforementioned Volozhin Yeshiva.

Halevy was influential in having R. Chaim Soloveichik appointed to head the yeshiva, and he hosted the latter in his own house for months at a time. Although Halevy is best known for his classic work Dorot Harishonim, rebutting many of the mainstream historical accounts of Jewish history, he was also most influential behind the scenes in uniting the leading rabbis of the West and of the East in forming the Agudath Israel world movement, as described by Reichel.

Isaac Halevy died in Hamburg in 1914 from a heart attack suffered three weeks earlier.

== Works ==
Isaac Halevy's major work was the Dorot Harishonim (Hebrew: דורות הראשונים: דברי הימים לבני ישראל), a six-volume religiously-oriented review of Jewish history, covering the span from the end of the Mishnaic period to the end of the geonic period. It is largely concerned with rebutting the accounts given by Jewish historians such as Solomon Judah Loeb Rapoport, Heinrich Graetz, Isaac Hirsch Weiss (author of Dor Dor ve-Doreshav), and the like. These works later formed the basis for Rabbi Avigdor Miller's writings on history, and more recently is heavily quoted and referenced in Codex Judaica: Chronological Index of Jewish History by Mattis Kantor.
