= Ivyanyets =

Ivyanyets Івянец (Belarusian) Ивенец (Russian) Iwieniec
- Urban-type settlement
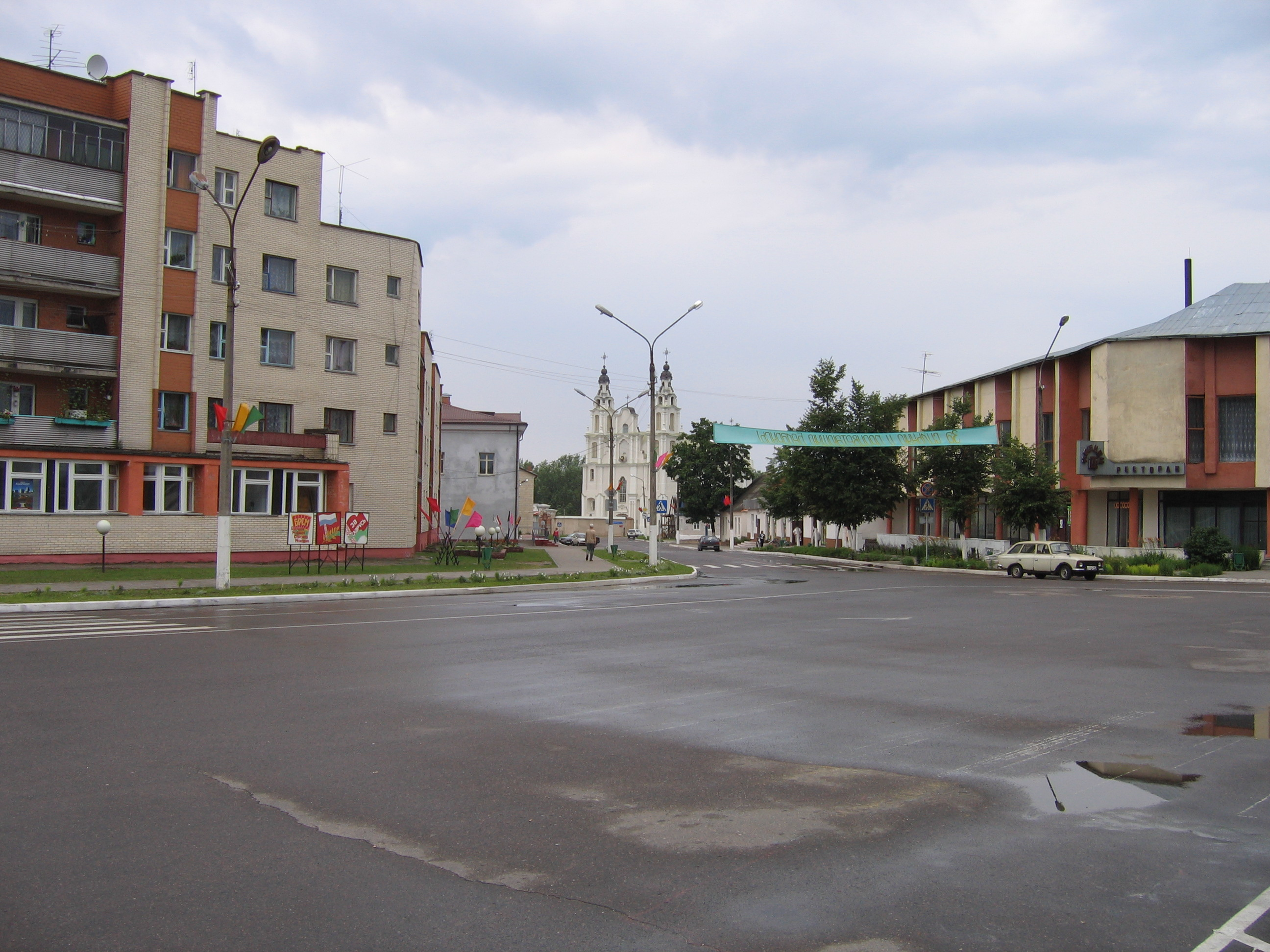
- Ivyanyets town center

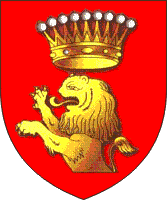
- Coat of arms

- Location within Belarus
- Coordinates: 53°53′24″N 26°44′49″E
- Country: Belarus
- Region: Minsk Region
- District: Valozhyn District
- First mentioned: 14th century
- Founded: 1444

Population (2025)
  - Total: 3,805
- Time zone: UTC+3 (MSK)
- Postal code: 222370
- Area code: +375 1772
- Vehicle registration: 5

Ivyanyets or Ivenets (Note: Belarusian: Iвянец, romanized: Ivianiec, IPA: [ivʲaˈnʲets]; Russian: Ивенец; Lithuanian: Ivenčius; Polish: Iwieniec.) is an urban-type settlement in Valozhyn District, Minsk Region, Belarus. It is located 56 kilometers (35 mi) west of Minsk. In 2017, its population was 4,206. As of 2025, it has a population of 3,805.

Ivyanyets is best known as the birthplace of Felix Dzerzhinsky, a Bolshevik revolutionary.

== History ==
=== Lithuanian-Polish rule ===
Ivyanyets is located in a hilly forested area on the Volma River, and its origins can be traced to the end of the 15th century in the Grand Duchy of Lithuania. Originally known as Givenech, presumably derived from Lithuanian gyventi – "to live", it was founded in 1444 as a privately owned settlement of the Sologub family, and by 1522 it was listed as a town within Minsk County of the Vilnius Voivodeship. Ivyanyets was home to a primarily Protestant Calvinist community, and it saw rapid growth with schools and a hospital. In 1606, a wooden church was built, and in 1640 the town was composed of 27 lots. During the Russo-Polish War (1654–1667), Ivyanyets was severely damaged by Russian forces, and slowly recovered over the next century. At the beginning of the 18th century Ivyanyets County was formed, with its administrative center located in the town, and in 1702 a Franciscan monastery was built by Theodore Vankovich. In 1745, Jan Michal Sologub built a stone church in the town. Sologub was the current Podskarby, the chief financial manager of the Polish–Lithuanian Commonwealth and a member of the Senate, and the owner of the town. By 1780, Ivyanyets was composed of 7 streets, a market, and 174 lots.

=== Russian rule ===
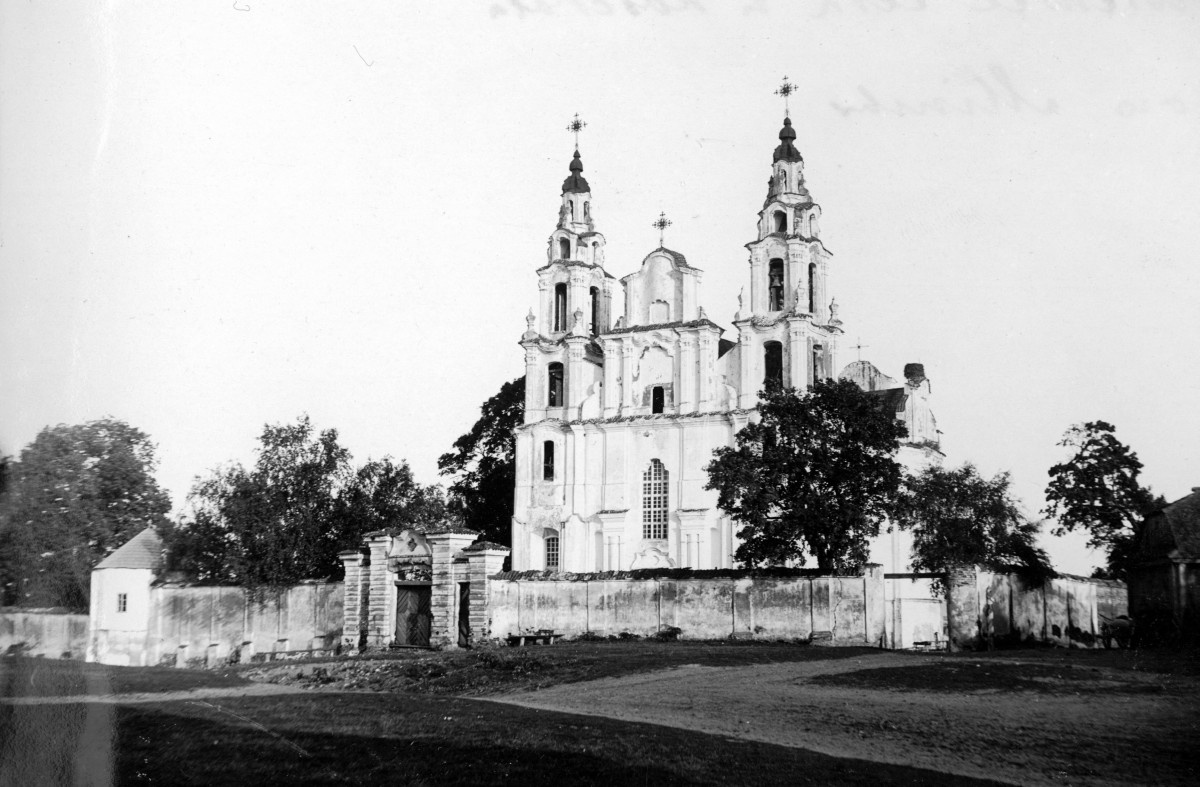
Church of Michael the Archangel, c. 1900

In 1793, as a result of the second partition of Poland, Ivyanyets became part of the Russian Empire and the center of a Minsk County township. During the January Uprising (1863-1864) against Russian rule in the former Polish–Lithuanian Commonwealth, 189 men from the town fought as insurgents on the Polish side. Following the suppression of the uprising, Russian authorities began a Russification process in the region. A public school was opened in Ivyanyets, and on November 28, 1869, the local Church of St. Michael and the Holy Trinity was forcibly altered to the Moscow Patriarchate of the Russian Orthodox Church. By 1880, Ivyanyets had 288 houses, 2 schools, 35 shops, 17 potteries, 2 inns, 2 churches and 2 synagogues, as well as weekly auctions and 2 fairs a year. According to the census of 1897, the number of households had increased to 399, with 2 churches and 2 chapels, a public school, 2 religious schools, 2 almshouses, an emergency room, a water mill, 15 workshops of baking pots, 9 store forges, 64, 2 restaurants, vodka storage, held 2 annual fairs and auctions on Sundays. At the beginning of the 20th century, Ivyanyets featured numerous hospitals and clinics, and in 1915 years around the St. Euphrosyne of Polotsk Orthodox church was built next to the fairgrounds.

=== Byelorussian SSR and Polish rule ===
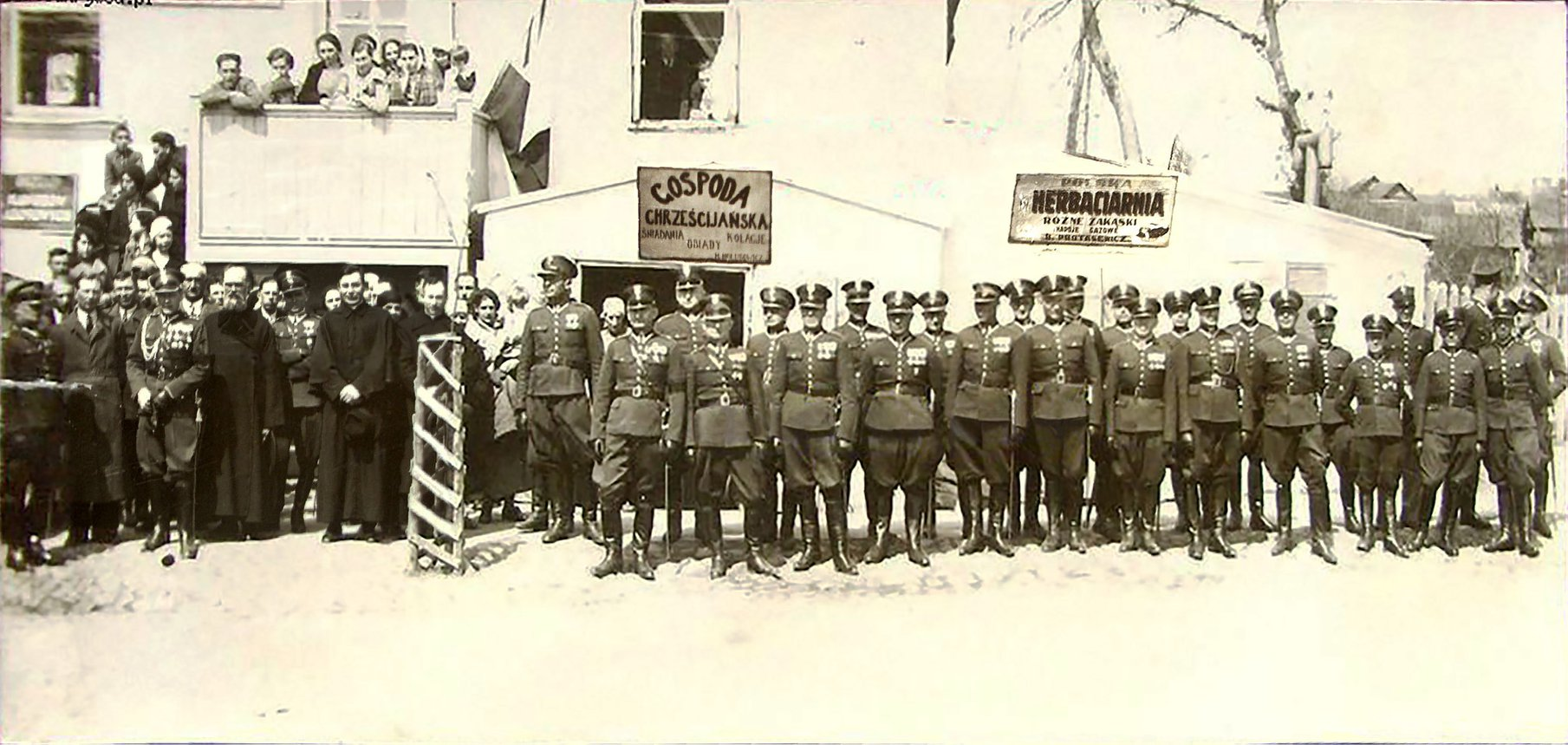
Polish Border Protection Corps in Iwieniec, 1938

In February 1918, Ivyanyets was occupied during the First World War by German troops as part of the invasion of Russia. On 25 March, 1918, Ivyanyets was proclaimed part of the short-lived independent Belarusian People's Republic, but on 1 January, 1919, in accordance with the decision of the Congress of the Communist Party (Bolsheviks) of Belarus, became a part of the Byelorussian SSR, but in August 1919, Ivyanyets was occupied by the Polish Army. According to the Treaty of Riga (1921) the town was included in the inter-war Second Polish Republic, initially within Stołpce County, and from 1923 in Wołożyn (Valozhyn) County in the Nowogródek Voivodeship, and was now 16 kilometers (9.9 mi) from the Belarusian SSR border. In the 1921 census, 64.4% people declared Polish nationality, 33.9% declared Jewish nationality, and 0.9% declared Belarusian nationality. In 1934, the electrification of Ivyanyets began when individuals from the town founded a power plant on the Volma River, on the land of a former Sologub family property. In 1936, Ivyanyets built a new school, and by 1938 the town had 574 buildings (including 10 stone) and a military airport.

=== World War II ===
In September 1939, Ivyanyets was occupied by the Red Army and, on 14 November 1939, incorporated into the Byelorussian SSR.

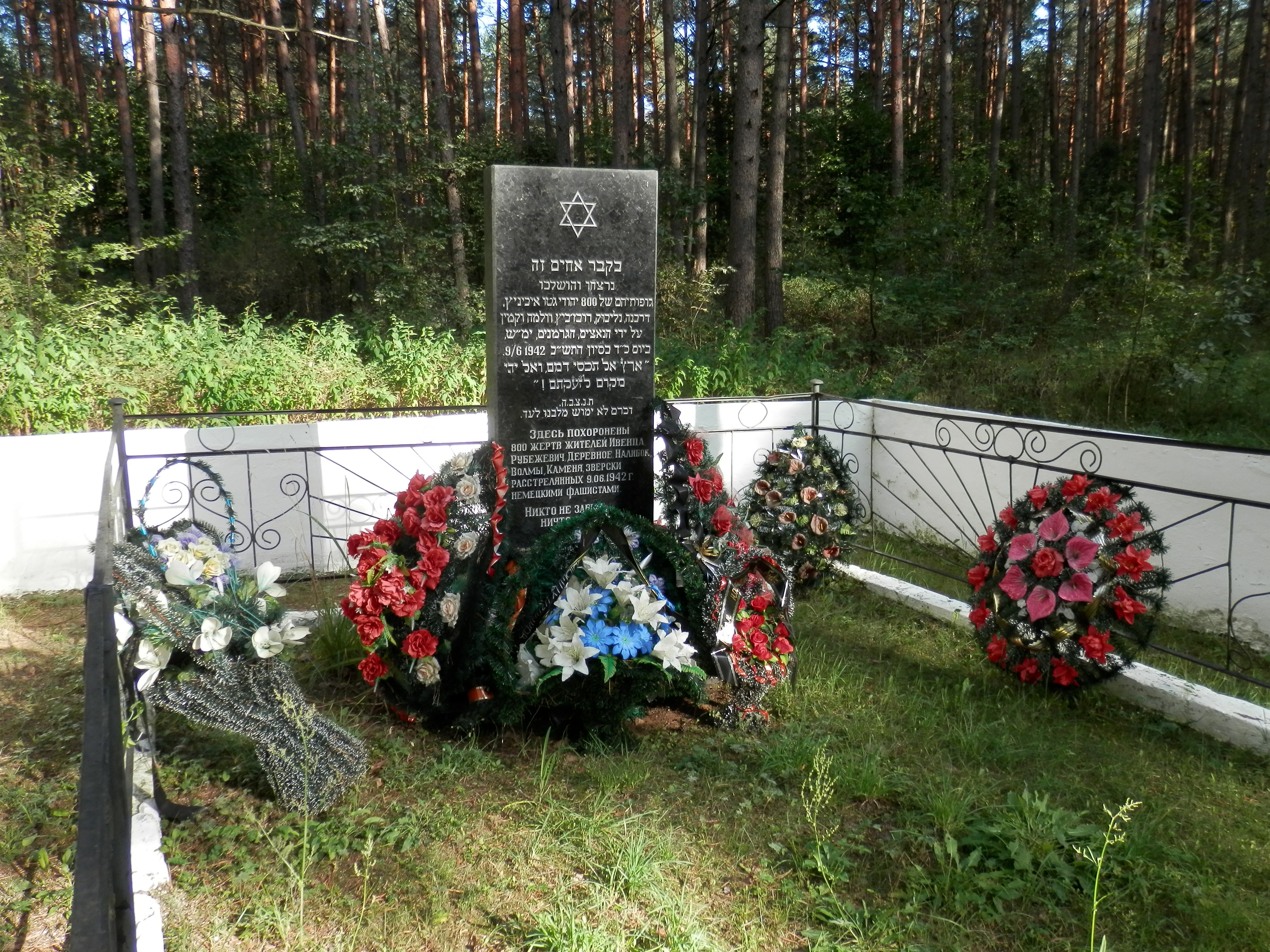
Holocaust victims memorial

From 26 June 1941 until 6 July 1944, Ivyanyets was occupied by Nazi Germany and administered as a part of the Generalbezirk Weißruthenien of Reichskommissariat Ostland. In 1941, there were probably about 1,200 Jews residing in Ivyanyets district. As a result of the quick advance of the Germans, few Jews were able to evacuate with the Red Army.

In the summer and autumn of 1941, the Germans introduced anti-Jewish measures, including the appointment of a Judenrat. On 5 September, 50 male Jews from the town were shot following the arrival of the German Security Police. In September, authority was transferred to the civil administration and the settlement became a district center in Gebiet Nowogrodek. On 10 November, the Germans established an enclosed Jewish ghetto in Ivyanyets which also received Jews from the surrounding villages. In early 1942, some Jews were selected and sent to other ghettos established in Poland, such as one in Navahrudak, as the Germans liquidated the remnants of the Ivyanyets ghetto on 9 June 1942. That day, about 800 victims were shot in a pit in a forest outside of town.

On 19 June, the Polish Partisan Unit from the AK Stołpce District captured the settlement and destroyed the local German garrison. The city was free for a dozen or so hours. These events went down in history as the 'Iwieniec Uprising'. In revenge for the defeat, the Germans later murdered about 150 inhabitants, and many others were deported to forced labor.

Soviet partisans briefly captured the settlement in June 1943 and killed some of the German garrison; many of the Jews who had escaped had sought refuge with the partisan units.

== Demographics ==
In 2024, it had a population of 3,848.

Distribution of the population by ethnicity according to the 2009 Belarusian census:

	percent
Belarusians	62.52%
Poles	31.74%
Russians	4.14%
Ukrainians	0.90%

== Notable people ==
- Felix Dzerzhinsky (1877–1926), Bolshevik revolutionary and Soviet statesman, born on an estate near Ivyanyets
- Yitzhak Isaac Halevy Rabinowitz (1847–1914), rabbi, Jewish historian, and founder of the Agudath Israel organization

== Gallery ==
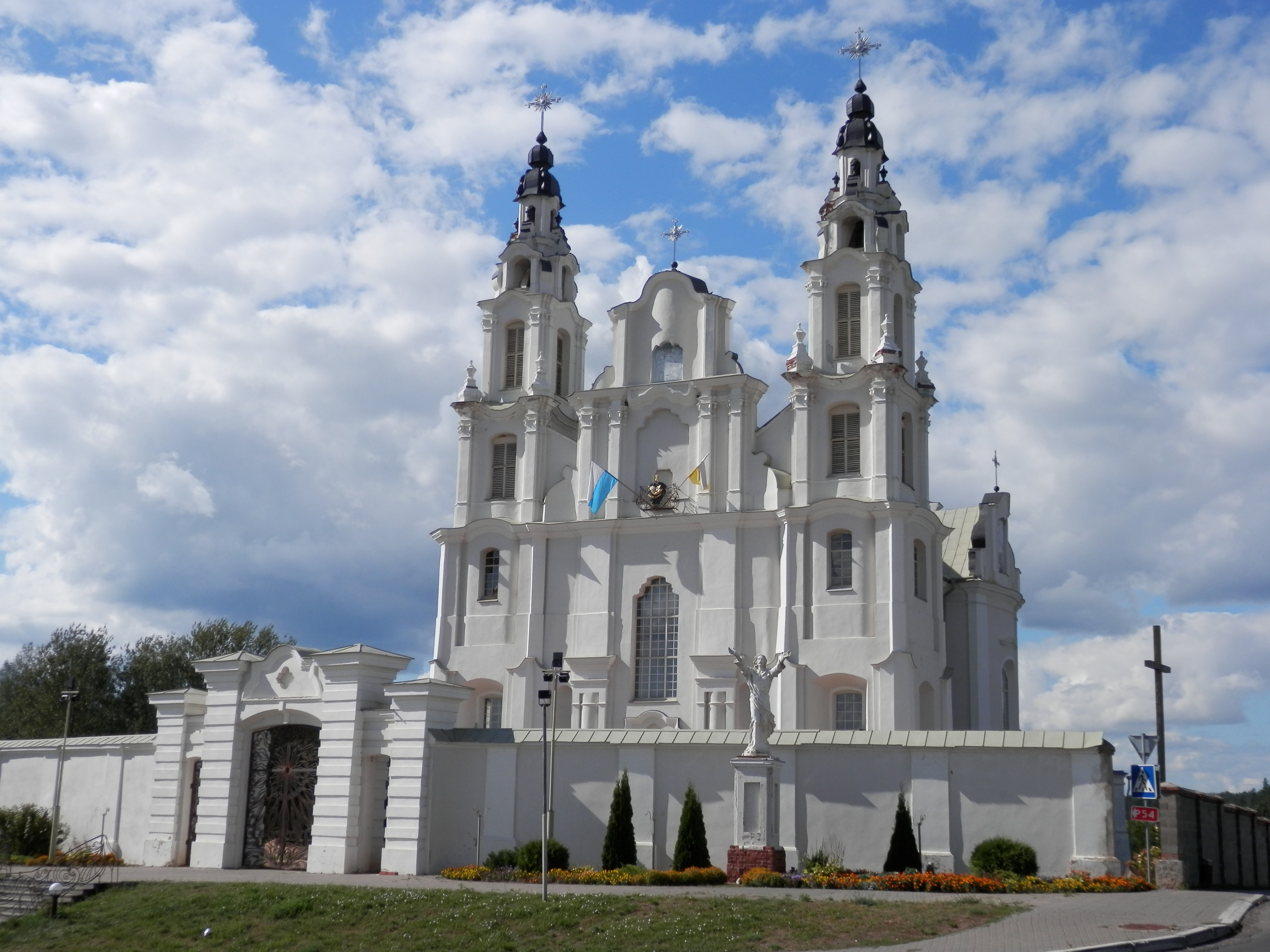
Roman Catholic Church of Michael the Archangel, built ca 1744–1750

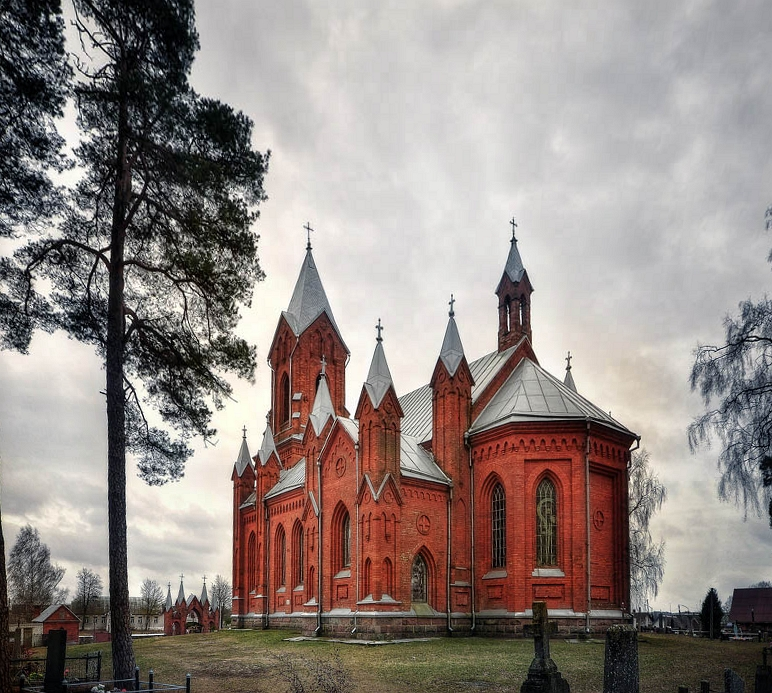
Roman Catholic Church of St. Alexis, built 1905–1907

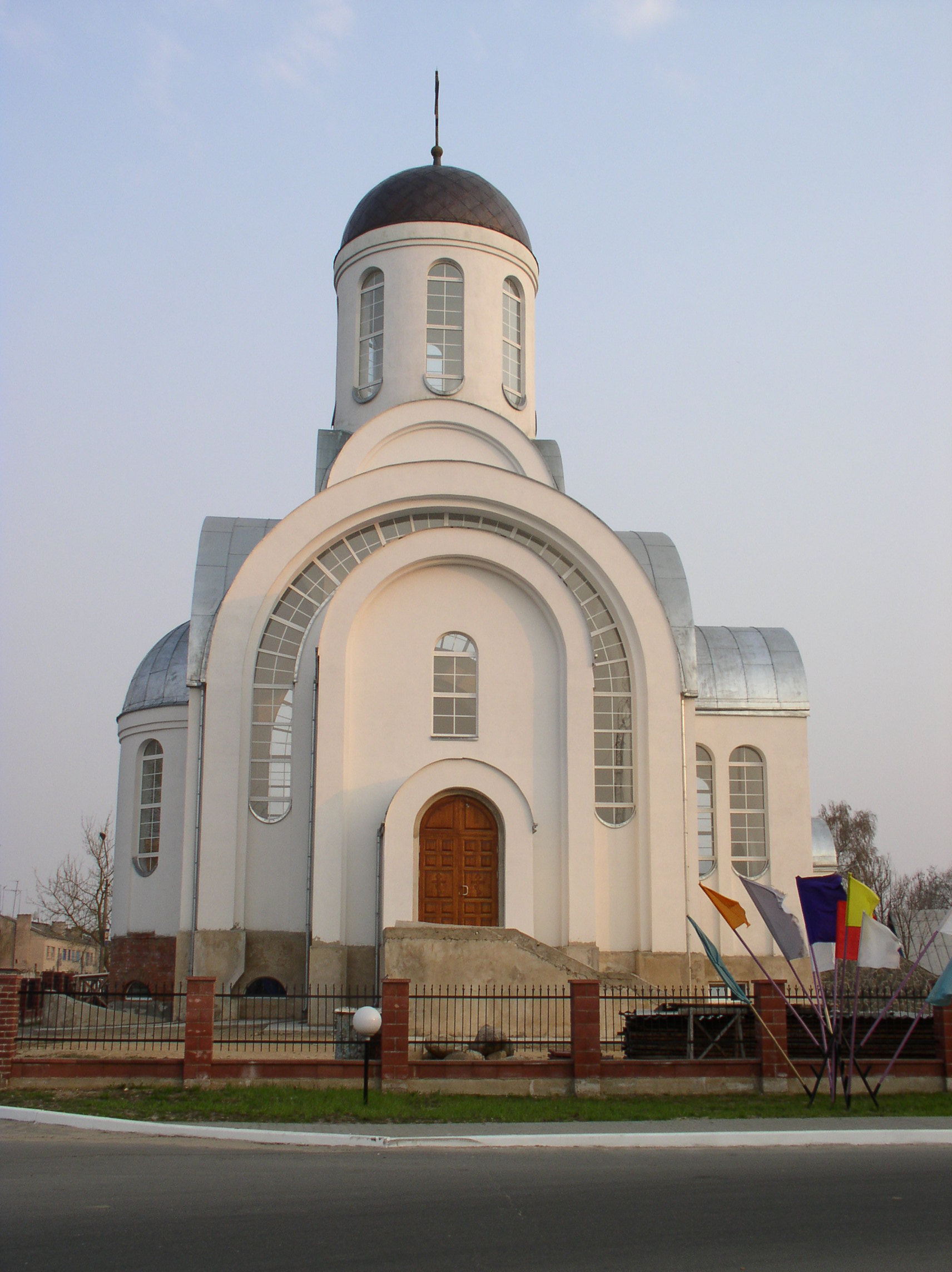
Orthodox Church of Euphrosyne, built 1998

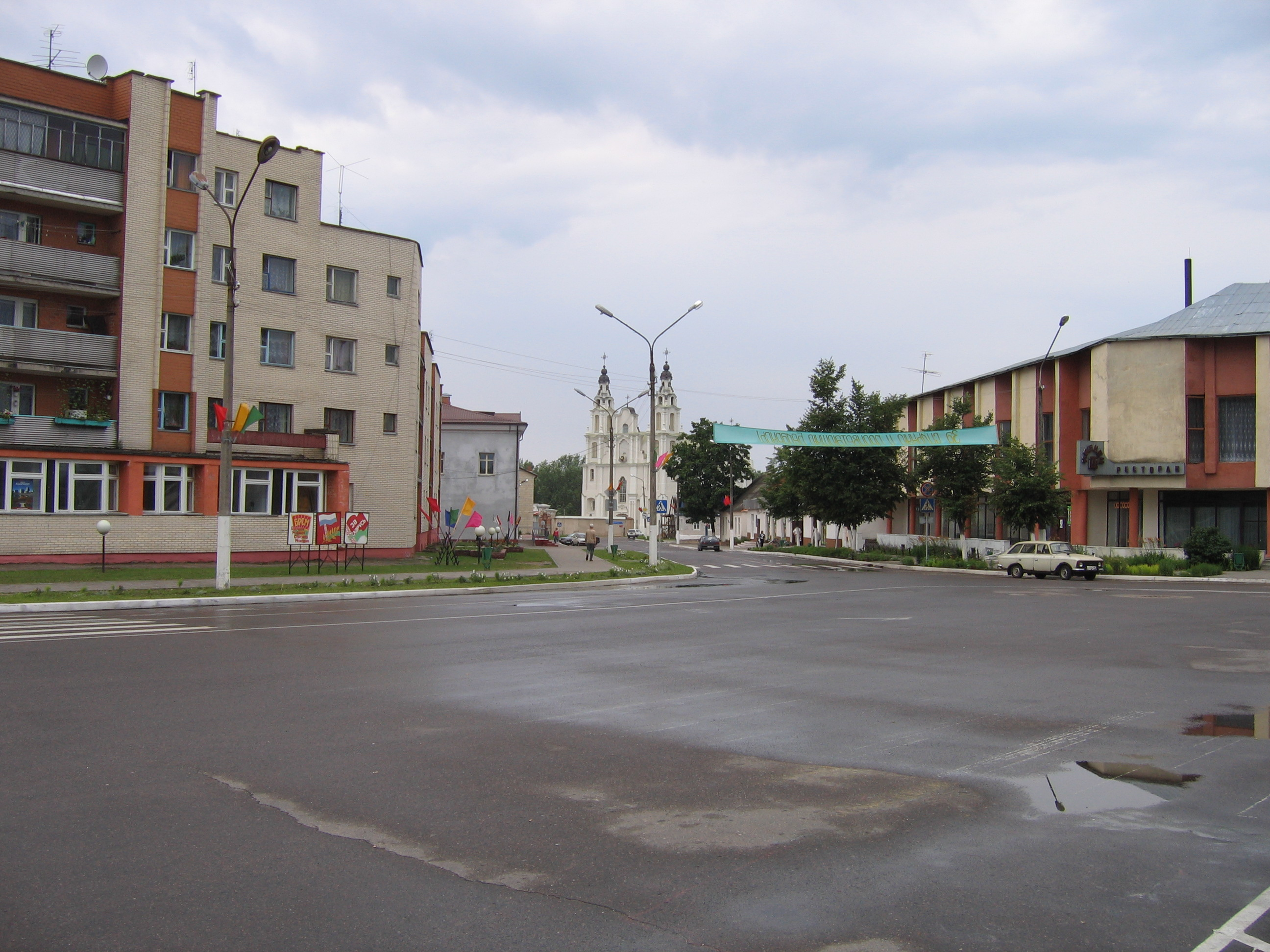
The center of Ivyanyets

== Sources ==
- Megargee, Geoffrey P.; Dean, Martin (4 May 2012). The United States Holocaust Memorial Museum Encyclopedia of Camps and Ghettos, 1933 –1945: Volume II: Ghettos in German-Occupied Eastern Europe. Indiana University Press. ISBN 978-0-253-00202-0.
