= Kacper Miłaszewski =

Kacper Miłaszewski (sometimes written as "Kasper"), nom-de-guerre Lewald (born 5 February 1911 in Bryniczew, died 21 May 1969 in Wrocław) was a Polish soldier, member of the Polish anti-Nazi resistance organization, the Home Army, leader of a partisan unit in Naliboki forest and the Stołpce region. He was one of the commanders in the so-called Iwieniec Uprising (June 19, 1943).
In December 1943 he was imprisoned by Soviet Partisans after being invited by them for "friendly talks". He was held at Lubianka Prison, then in the Soviet gulag. He returned to Poland in 1948. He was a recipient of the order of Virtuti Militari.
