= Operation Hermann =

1943 military operation German-occupied Byelorussia

- Part of Bandenbekämpfung in German-occupied Byelorussia during World War II
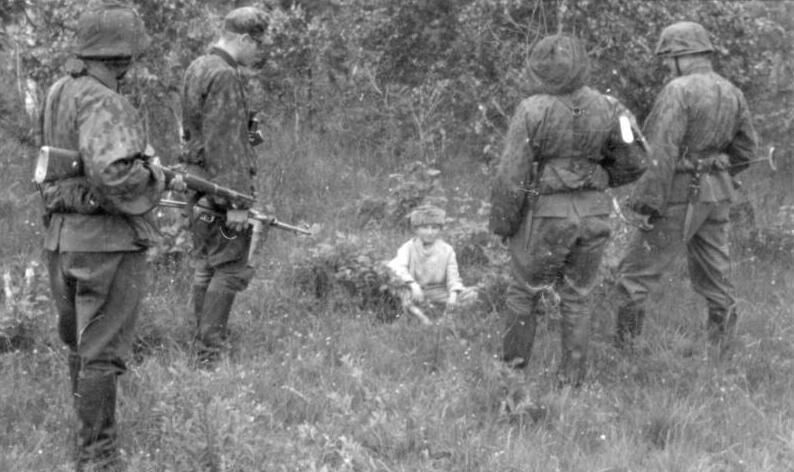
- Waffen-SS soldiers and a village boy captured by them
Date	13 July – 11 August 1943
Location	Naliboki Forest, German-occupied Byelorussia
Result	Inconclusive

Belligerents
Germany; Belarusian Polizei	(Polish Underground State) Home Army; Bielski partisans

Commanders and leaders
Curt von Gottberg; Barys Rahula	(Polish Underground State) Kacper Miłaszewski

Units involved
1st and 12th Police Armored Companies 47th Belarusian Schutzmannschaft Battalions	

Casualties and losses
52 killed 165 wounded 5 missing several armored vehicles and cars	Polish Underground State: approx. 40 killed approx 100–150 missing several dozen wounded
- 4,280 civilians killed; 60 villages destroyed

Operation Hermann was a German anti-partisan action in the Naliboki forest area carried out between 13 July 1943 and 11 August 1943. The German battle groups destroyed settlements in the area. During the operation, German troops burned down over 60 Polish and Belarusian villages and murdered 4,280 civilians. Between 21,000 and 25,000 people were sent to forced labour in Nazi Germany.

The Germans, with the support of Belarusian collaborators, killed most of the local Jews and inflicted terror on the Polish population. At the same time, the boundless Nalibotsky Forest became a refuge for Red Army soldiers who managed to escape German capture and for Jews who escaped from the surrounding ghettos.

Following the operation, the communities around the Naliboki forest were devastated, the Germans deported the non-Jewish residents fit for work to Germany for slave labor and murdered most of the rest. Prior to the manhunt, homeless refugees were mainly Jews who had escaped the ghetto, but in the fall of 1943 non-Jewish Belarusians, Poles, and Roma who managed to flee roamed in the forest. Many joined partisan units, special family camps set up by the Soviets, and some joined the Bielski group who returned to the area and accepted anyone willing to join. While the Germans wrecked many communities, much was left behind in and around the forest that could sustain life. Fields, orchards, and beehives all had their produce and farm animals roamed the area around the forest.

According to an after action report, during a fight against partisans, Oskar Dirlewanger was shot in the sleeve. A bullet grazed his chest and a cigarette was knocked out of his mouth by a bullet.
