= Valozhyn district =

District of Minsk region, Belarus

Valozhyn district Валожынскі раён (Belarusian) Воложинский район (Russian)
- District
- Flag Coat of arms

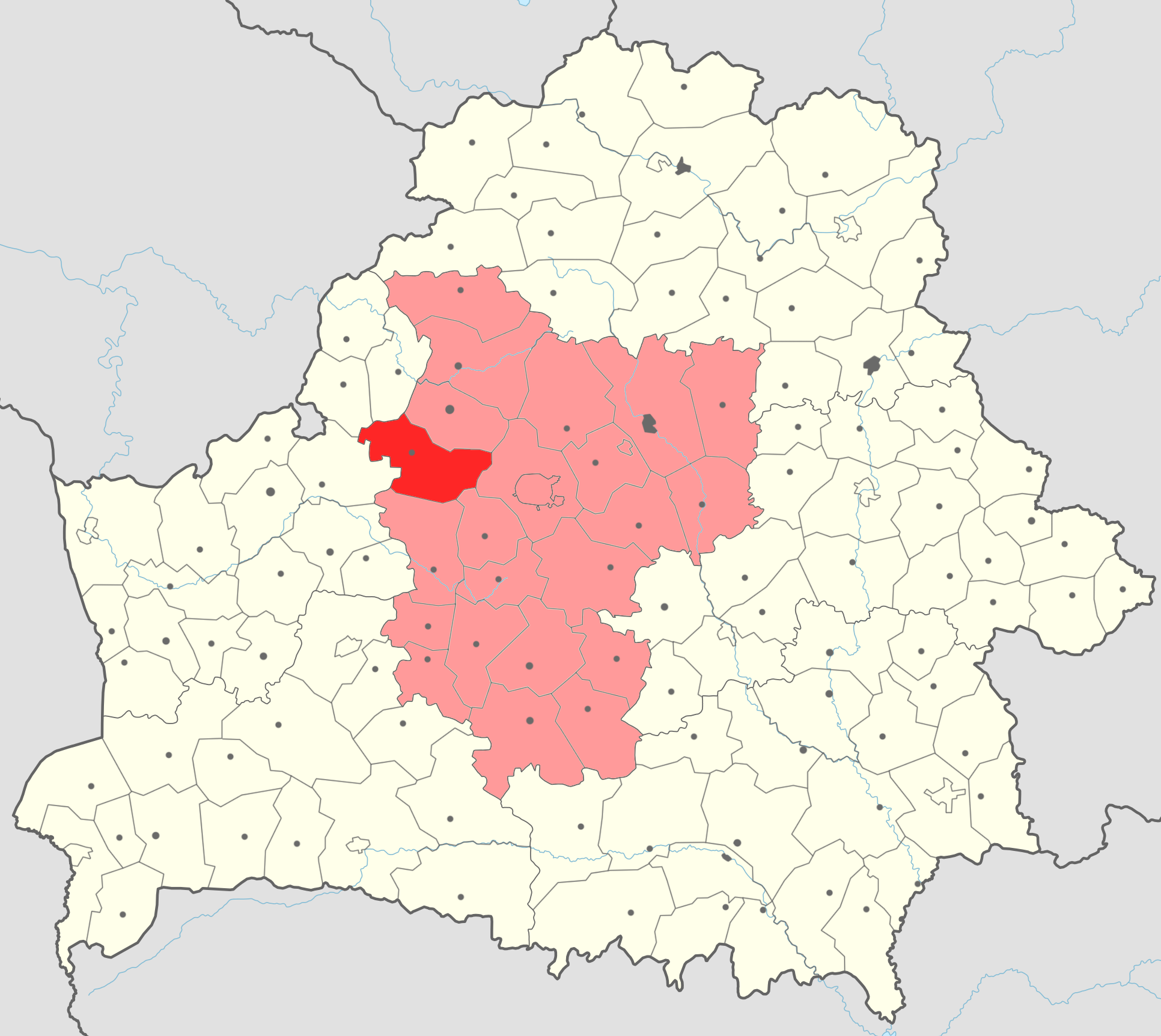
- Coordinates: 54°05′N 26°31′E
- Country: Belarus
- Region: Minsk region
- Administrative center: Valozhyn

Area
  - District: 1,916 km^{2} (740 sq mi)

Population (2024)
  - District: 33,499
  - Density: 17.48/km^{2} (45.28/sq mi)
  - Urban: 13,863
  - Rural: 19,636
- Time zone: UTC+3 (MSK)

Valozhyn district or Valožyn district (Belarusian: Валожынскі раён; Russian: Воложинский район) is district (raion) of Minsk region in Belarus. Its administrative center is Valozhyn. As of 2024, it has a population of 33,499.

== Notable residents ==
- Nahum Goldmann (1895–1982), founder and president of the World Jewish Congress, and president of the World Zionist Organization
- Francišak Kušal (1895, Piaršai – 1969), Belarusian political and military leader
- Shimon Peres (born Szymon Perski; 1923–2016), prime minister of Israel and president of Israel
- Yehoshua Rabinovitz (1911–1979), Israeli mayor of Tel Aviv.
