= Kaniūkai (disambiguation) =

Kaniūkai might refer to these villages in Lithuania:

- Kaniūkai, village in Šalčininkai district municipality, Vilnius County
  - Kaniūkai massacre, a massacre of Polish civilians in 1944
- Kaniūkai (Jakėnai), village in Jakėnai eldership, Varėna district municipality, Alytus County
- Kaniūkai (Kaniava), village in Kaniava eldership, Varėna district municipality, Alytus County
