= January 29 =

January 29 this year in various calendars
- Thursday, 29 January 2026
Akan	Foyaw
Armenian	13 Mehekani 1475
Aztec	Toxcatl 19, 7 Mazātl
Babylonian	9 Tebetu, 2336 SE
Balinese pawukon	Luang, Pepet, Pasah, Jaya, Umanis, Tungleh, Wraspati of Matal, Kala, Urungan, Duka
Bengali	15 Magh, BS 1432
Chinese	Yin Water Rabbit・Well Mansion; Wood Snake Year, Month 12, Day 11 (Dahan, 6 days until Lichun)
Common Era	29 January 2026 CE
Coptic	21 Tobi, AM 1742
Egyptian	18 Payni, 2774 NE
Ethiopian	21 Ṭer, 2018 Amätä Məhrät
French Republican	Décade I, Décadi de Pluviôse de l'Année 234 de la République
Gregorian	29 January, AD 2026
Hebrew	11 Shevat, AM 5786
Hindu	Mṛgaśiras・Indra; Solar: 16 Māgha, 1947 SE; Lunisolar: Ekādaśī, Śukla pakṣa of Māgha, 2082 VE; Siddhārthin・5126 KY・1,872,604
Icelandic	Fimmtudagur, 7 Þorri 2025
Islamic	10 Sha'aban, AH 1447 (using tabular method)
ISO week date	2026-W05-4
Japanese	11 Shiwasu, Reiwa 8 (Daikan, 6 days until Risshun)
Julian	16 January, AD 2026 (AM 7534)
Julian day	2461070
Korean	11 Sodal, 4358 DE
Maya	13.0.13.5.7; 5 Pax, 7 Manik
Roman	ante diem XVII Kalendas Februarias, MMDCCLXXIX AUC
Solar Hijri	9 Bahman, SH 1404
Tibetan	11 rgyal, shing mo sbrul 2152 or 1771 or 999

<<	January					>>
Su	Mo	Tu	We	Th	Fr	Sa
				1	2	3
4	5	6	7	8	9	10
11	12	13	14	15	16	17
18	19	20	21	22	23	24
25	26	27	28	29	30	31
2026

January 29 in recent years
2026 (Thursday)
2025 (Wednesday)
2024 (Monday)
2023 (Sunday)
2022 (Saturday)
2021 (Friday)
2020 (Wednesday)
2019 (Tuesday)
2018 (Monday)
2017 (Sunday)

January 29 is the 29th day of the year in the Gregorian calendar; 336 days remain until the end of the year (337 in leap years).

== Events ==
=== Pre-1600 ===
- 904 – Sergius III is elected pope, after coming out of retirement to take over the papacy from the deposed antipope Christopher.
- 946 – Caliph al-Mustakfi is blinded and deposed by Mu'izz al-Dawla, ruler of the Buyid Empire. He is succeeded by al-Muti as caliph of the Abbasid Caliphate.

=== 1601–1900 ===
- 1814 – War of the Sixth Coalition: France engages Russia and Prussia in the Battle of Brienne.
- 1819 – Stamford Raffles lands on the island of Singapore.
- 1845 – "The Raven" is published in The Evening Mirror in New York, the first publication with the name of the author, Edgar Allan Poe.
- 1850 – Henry Clay introduces the Compromise of 1850 to the U.S. Congress.
- 1856 – Queen Victoria issues a Warrant under the Royal sign-manual that establishes the Victoria Cross to recognise acts of valour by British military personnel during the Crimean War.
- 1861 – Kansas is admitted as the 34th U.S. state.
- 1863 – The Bear River Massacre: A detachment of California Volunteers led by Colonel Patrick Edward Connor engage the Shoshone at Bear River, Washington Territory, killing hundreds of men, women and children.
- 1886 – Karl Benz patents the first successful gasoline-driven automobile.
- 1891 – Liliʻuokalani is proclaimed the last monarch and only queen regnant of the Kingdom of Hawaii.

=== 1901–present ===
- 1907 – Charles Curtis of Kansas becomes the first Native American U.S. Senator.
- 1911 – Mexican Revolution: Mexicali is captured by the Mexican Liberal Party, igniting the Magonista rebellion of 1911.
- 1918 – Ukrainian–Soviet War: The Bolshevik Red Army, on its way to besiege Kyiv, is met by a small group of military students at the Battle of Kruty.
- 1918 – Ukrainian–Soviet War: An armed uprising organized by the Bolsheviks in anticipation of the encroaching Red Army begins at the Kiev Arsenal, which will be put down six days later.
- 1936 – The first inductees into the Baseball Hall of Fame are announced.
- 1940 – Three trains on the Nishinari Line; present Sakurajima Line, in Osaka, Japan, collide and explode while approaching Ajikawaguchi Station. One hundred and eighty-one people are killed.
- 1943 – World War II: The first day of the Battle of Rennell Island, USS Chicago (CA-29) is torpedoed and heavily damaged by Japanese bombers.
- 1944 – World War II: Approximately 38 people are killed and about a dozen injured when the Polish village of Koniuchy (present-day Kaniūkai, Lithuania) is attacked by Soviet partisan units.
- 1944 – World War II: In Bologna, Italy, the Anatomical theatre of the Archiginnasio is completely destroyed in an air-raid.
- 1959 – The first Melodifestivalen is held at Cirkus in Stockholm, Sweden.
- 1971 – The last of its many UFO sightings is made at Pudasjärvi, Finland.
- 1973 – EgyptAir Flight 741 crashes into the Kyrenia Mountains in Cyprus, killing 37 people.
- 1983 – Singapore cable car crash: Panamanian-registered oil rig, Eniwetok, strikes the cables of the Singapore Cable Car system linking the mainland and Sentosa Island, causing two cabins to fall into the water and killing seven people and leaving thirteen others trapped for hours.
- 1989 – Cold War: Hungary establishes diplomatic relations with South Korea, making it the first Eastern Bloc nation to do so.
- 1991 – Gulf War: The Battle of Khafji, the first major ground engagement of the war, as well as its deadliest, begins between Iraq and Saudi Arabia.
- 1996 – President Jacques Chirac announces a "definitive end" to French nuclear weapons testing.
- 2001 – Thousands of student protesters in Indonesia storm parliament and demand that President Abdurrahman Wahid resign due to alleged involvement in corruption scandals.
- 2002 – In his State of the Union address, President George W. Bush describes "regimes that sponsor terror" as an Axis of evil, in which he includes Iraq, Iran and North Korea.
- 2005 – The first direct commercial flights from mainland China (from Guangzhou) to Taiwan since 1949 arrived in Taipei. Shortly afterwards, a China Airlines flight lands in Beijing.
- 2008 – An Egyptian court rules that people who do not adhere to one of the three government-recognised religions, while not allowed to list any belief outside of those three, are still eligible to receive government identity documents.
- 2009 – Governor of Illinois Rod Blagojevich is removed from office following his conviction of several corruption charges, including solicitation of personal benefit in exchange for an appointment to the United States Senate as a replacement for then-U.S. president-elect Barack Obama.
- 2013 – SCAT Airlines Flight 760 crashes near the Kazakh city of Almaty, killing 21 people.
- 2014 – Rojava conflict: The Afrin Canton declares its autonomy from the Syrian Arab Republic.
- 2017 – A gunman opens fire at the Islamic Cultural Centre of Quebec City, killing six people and wounding 19 others in a spree shooting.
- 2020 - A plinth breaks between Coral Edge Station and Riviera Station in Singapore, Coral Edge closes one platform.
- 2022 – Canadian truck drivers and pedestrians gathered to rally and protest on Parliament Hill against Canadian COVID-19 restrictions, which caused traffic and closures around the city.
- 2025 – American Eagle Flight 5342 collided mid-air with a Sikorsky UH-60 Black Hawk operated by the United States Army and crashed into the Potomac River, killing all 67 people on board both aircraft.
- 2025 – A chartered Beechcraft 1900 crashes near the Unity oilfield in South Sudan, killing 20 people.

== Births ==
=== Pre-1600 ===
- 1455 – Johann Reuchlin, German-born humanist and scholar (died 1522)
- 1475 – Giuliano Bugiardini, Italian painter (died 1555)
- 1499 – Katharina von Bora, wife of Martin Luther; formerly a Roman Catholic nun (died 1552)
- 1525 – Lelio Sozzini, Italian humanist and reformer (died 1562)
- 1584 – Frederick Henry, Prince of Orange (died 1647)
- 1591 – Franciscus Junius, German pioneer philologist (died 1677)

=== 1601–1900 ===
- 1602 – Countess Amalie Elisabeth of Hanau-Münzenberg (died 1651)
- 1632 – Johann Georg Graevius, German scholar and critic (died 1703)
- 1688 – Emanuel Swedenborg, Swedish astronomer, philosopher, and theologian (died 1772)
- 1711 – Giuseppe Bonno, Austrian composer (died 1788)
- 1715 – Georg Christoph Wagenseil, Austrian organist and composer (died 1777)
- 1717 – Jeffery Amherst, 1st Baron Amherst, English field marshal and politician, 19th Governor General of Canada (died 1797)
- 1718 – Paul Rabaut, French pastor (died 1794)
- 1737 – Thomas Paine, English-American political activist, philosopher, political theorist, and revolutionary (died 1809)
- 1749 – Christian VII of Denmark (died 1808)
- 1754 – Moses Cleaveland, American general, lawyer, and politician, founded Cleveland, Ohio (died 1806)
- 1756 – Henry Lee III, American general and politician, 9th Governor of Virginia (died 1818)
- 1761 – Albert Gallatin, Swiss-American ethnologist, linguist, and politician, 4th United States Secretary of the Treasury (died 1849)
- 1782 – Daniel Auber, French composer (died 1871)
- 1792 – Lemuel H. Arnold, American politician (died 1852)
- 1801 – Johannes Bernardus van Bree, Dutch violinist, composer, and conductor (died 1857)
- 1810 – Ernst Kummer, Polish-German mathematician and academic (died 1893)
- 1810 – Mary Whitwell Hale, American teacher, school founder, and hymnwriter (died 1862)
- 1843 – William McKinley, American soldier, lawyer, and politician, 25th President of the United States (died 1901)
- 1846 – Karol Olszewski, Polish chemist, mathematician and physicist (died 1915)
- 1852 – Frederic Hymen Cowen, Jamaican-English pianist, composer, and conductor (died 1935)
- 1858 – Henry Ward Ranger, American painter and academic (died 1916)
- 1860 – Anton Chekhov, Russian playwright and short story writer (died 1904)
- 1861 – Florida Ruffin Ridley, American civil rights activist, teacher, editor, and writer (died 1943)
- 1862 – Frederick Delius, English composer (died 1934)
- 1864 – Richard Arman Gregory, British astronomer (died 1952)
- 1866 – Romain Rolland, French historian, author, and playwright, Nobel Prize laureate (died 1944)
- 1867 – Vicente Blasco Ibáñez, Spanish journalist and author (died 1928)
- 1874 – John D. Rockefeller Jr., American businessman and philanthropist (died 1960)
- 1876 – Havergal Brian, English composer (died 1972)
- 1880 – W. C. Fields, American actor, comedian, and screenwriter (died 1946)
- 1881 – Alice Catherine Evans, American microbiologist (died 1975)
- 1884 – Juhan Aavik, Estonian-Swedish composer and conductor (died 1982)
- 1886 – Karl Freudenberg, German chemist (died 1983)
- 1888 – Sydney Chapman, English mathematician and geophysicist (died 1970)
- 1888 – Wellington Koo, Chinese statesman (died 1985)
- 1892 – Ernst Lubitsch, German American film director, producer, writer, and actor (died 1947)
- 1895 – Muna Lee, American poet and author (died 1965)

=== 1901–present ===
- 1901 – Allen B. DuMont, American engineer and broadcaster, founded the DuMont Television Network (died 1965)
- 1901 – E. P. Taylor, Canadian businessman and horse breeder (died 1989)
- 1905 – Barnett Newman, American painter and etcher (died 1970)
- 1913 – Victor Mature, American actor (died 1999)
- 1915 – Bill Peet, American author and illustrator (died 2002)
- 1915 – John Serry Sr., Italian-American concert accordionist and composer (died 2003)
- 1916 – Roy Markham, British plant virologist (died 1979)
- 1917 – John Raitt, American actor and singer (died 2005)
- 1918 – John Forsythe, American actor (died 2010)
- 1920 – Paul Gayten, American R&B pianist, songwriter, producer, and record company executive (died 1991)
- 1923 – Paddy Chayefsky, American author and screenwriter (died 1981)
- 1923 – Eddie Taylor, American electric blues guitarist and singer (died 1985)
- 1926 – Abdus Salam, Pakistani-British physicist and academic, Nobel Prize laureate (died 1996)
- 1927 – Edward Abbey, American environmentalist and author (died 1989)
- 1928 – Joseph Kruskal, American mathematician and computer scientist (died 2010)
- 1928 – Lee Shau-kee, Hong Kong real estate billionaire (died 2025)
- 1929 – Elio Petri, Italian director and screenwriter (died 1982)
- 1931 – Leslie Bricusse, English playwright and composer (died 2021)
- 1931 – Ferenc Mádl, Hungarian academic and politician, 2nd President of Hungary (died 2011)
- 1932 – Raman Subba Row, English cricketer and referee (died 2024)
- 1933 – Sacha Distel, French singer and guitarist (died 2004)
- 1934 – Alan Cowley, British chemist (died 2020)
- 1936 – James Jamerson, American bass player (died 1983)
- 1936 – Veturi, Indian poet and songwriter (died 2010)
- 1937 – Jeff Clyne, British musician (died 2009)
- 1939 – Germaine Greer, Australian journalist and author
- 1939 – Jeanne Lee, American jazz singer, poet and composer (died 2000)
- 1940 – Justino Díaz, Puerto Rican opera singer
- 1940 – Katharine Ross, American actress and author
- 1941 – Robin Morgan, American actress, journalist, and author (died 2026)
- 1941 – Gamini Jayawickrama Perera, Sri Lankan politician (died 2024)
- 1942 – Arnaldo Tamayo Méndez, Cuban military officer, legislator and cosmonaut
- 1943 – Tony Blackburn, English radio and television host
- 1943 – Pat Quinn, Canadian ice hockey player and coach (died 2014)
- 1943 – Mark Wynter, English singer and actor
- 1945 – Ibrahim Boubacar Keïta, Malian academic and politician, Prime Minister of Mali (died 2022)
- 1945 – Tom Selleck, American actor and businessman
- 1946 – Geater Davis, American singer-songwriter (died 1984)
- 1946 – Bettye LaVette, American singer-songwriter
- 1947 – Linda B. Buck, American biologist and academic, Nobel Prize laureate
- 1947 – David Byron, English singer-songwriter (died 1985)
- 1947 – Marián Varga, Slovak organist and composer (died 2017)
- 1948 – Raymond Keene, English chess player and author
- 1948 – Cristina Saralegui, Cuban-American journalist, actress and talk show host
- 1948 – Marc Singer, Canadian-American actor
- 1949 – Doris Davenport, American poet and teacher
- 1949 – Tommy Ramone, Hungarian-American drummer and producer (died 2014)
- 1950 – Ann Jillian, American actress and singer
- 1950 – Miklós Vámos, Hungarian writer, novelist, screenwriter and translator
- 1952 – Pete Geren, American attorney and politician
- 1952 – Tim Healy, British actor
- 1953 – Teresa Teng, Taiwanese singer (died 1995)
- 1953 – Charlie Wilson, American singer-songwriter and producer
- 1954 – Terry Kinney, American actor and director
- 1954 – Oprah Winfrey, American talk show host, actress, and producer, founded Harpo Productions
- 1955 – Greg Ballard, American basketball player and coach (died 2016)
- 1955 – John Tate, American boxer (died 1998)
- 1956 – Irlene Mandrell, American musician, actress, and model
- 1956 – Amii Stewart, American singer and dancer
- 1957 – Diane Delano, American actress (died 2024)
- 1957 – Ron Franscell, American author and journalist
- 1958 – Judy Norton, American actress and theater director
- 1960 – Cho-liang Lin, Taiwanese-American musician
- 1960 – Greg Louganis, American diver and author
- 1960 – Steve Sax, American baseball player
- 1960 – Gia Carangi, American supermodel (died 1986)
- 1961 – Strive Masiyiwa, Zimbabwean businessman and philanthropist
- 1962 – Gauri Lankesh, Indian journalist and activist (died 2017)
- 1962 – Lee Terry, American politician and lawyer
- 1962 – Nicholas Turturro, American actor, director, producer, and screenwriter
- 1964 – Roddy Frame, Scottish singer-songwriter and musician
- 1964 – Andre Reed, American football player
- 1965 – David Agus, American physician and author
- 1965 – Dominik Hašek, Czech ice hockey player
- 1967 – Sean Burke, Canadian ice hockey player and coach
- 1967 – Stacey King, American basketball player, coach, and sportscaster (died 2026)
- 1968 – Edward Burns, American actor, director, writer, and producer
- 1968 – Monte Cook, American game designer and writer
- 1968 – Aeneas Williams, American football player
- 1969 – Sam Trammell, American actor
- 1970 – Heather Graham, American actress
- 1970 – Jörg Hoffmann, German swimmer
- 1970 – Rajyavardhan Singh Rathore, Indian colonel and politician
- 1970 – Paul Ryan, American politician, 62nd Speaker of the United States House of Representatives
- 1971 – Clare Balding, English broadcaster, journalist and author
- 1972 – Brian Wood, American writer, illustrator and graphic designer
- 1973 – Megan McArdle, American journalist
- 1973 – Jason Schmidt, American baseball player
- 1975 – Sharif Atkins, American actor
- 1975 – Sara Gilbert, American actress, producer, and talk show host
- 1975 – Kelly Packard, American actress
- 1977 – Justin Hartley, American actor
- 1977 – Sam Jaeger, American actor and screenwriter
- 1979 – Andrew Keegan, American actor
- 1979 – Christina Koch, American engineer and astronaut
- 1980 – Jason James Richter, American actor and musician
- 1981 – Tenoch Huerta, Mexican actor
- 1981 – Jonny Lang, American singer, songwriter and guitarist
- 1982 – Adam Lambert, American singer, songwriter and actor
- 1983 – Tim Gleason, American ice hockey player
- 1985 – Marc Gasol, Spanish basketball player
- 1985 – Isabel Lucas, Australian actress and model
- 1985 – Rag'n'Bone Man, English singer-songwriter
- 1986 – Chris Bourque, American ice hockey player
- 1986 – Thomas Greiss, German ice hockey player
- 1986 – Jair Jurrjens, Curaçaoan baseball player
- 1987 – José Abreu, Cuban baseball player
- 1987 – Alex Avila, American baseball player
- 1987 – Jessica Burkhart, American author
- 1987 – Vladimír Mihálik, Slovak ice hockey player
- 1988 – Ayobami Adebayo, Nigerian author
- 1988 – Jake Auchincloss, American politician, businessman, and Marine veteran
- 1988 – Hank Conger, American baseball player
- 1988 – Shay Logan, English footballer
- 1989 – Mohamed Abou Gabal, Egyptian footballer
- 1989 – Kevin Shattenkirk, American ice hockey player
- 1992 – Markel Brown, American basketball player
- 1992 – Maxi Kleber, German basketball player
- 1993 – Kyary Pamyu Pamyu, Japanese singer
- 1997 – Joel Eriksson Ek, Swedish ice hockey player
- 1997 – Jack Roslovic, American ice hockey player
- 2001 – Lee Dae-hwi, South Korean singer
- 2003 – Jarell Quansah, English footballer

== Deaths ==
=== Pre-1600 ===
- 757 – An Lushan, Chinese general (born 703)
- 803 – Ja'far ibn Yahya al-Barmaki, Persian vizier
- 1119 – Pope Gelasius II (born 1060)
- 1597 – Elias Ammerbach, German organist and composer (born 1530)

=== 1601–1900 ===
- 1647 – Francis Meres, English priest and author (born 1565)
- 1678 – Jerónimo Lobo, Portuguese missionary and author (born 1593)
- 1706 – Charles Sackville, 6th Earl of Dorset, English poet and courtier (born 1643)
- 1737 – George Hamilton, 1st Earl of Orkney, Scottish-English field marshal and politician, Colonial Governor of Virginia (born 1666)
- 1743 – André-Hercule de Fleury, French cardinal (born 1653)
- 1763 – Juan José Eguiara y Eguren, Mexican bishop and Catholic scholar (born 1696)
- 1763 – Louis Racine, French poet (born 1692)
- 1820 – George III of the United Kingdom (born 1738)
- 1829 – Paul Barras, French captain and politician (born 1755)
- 1870 – Leopold II, Grand Duke of Tuscany (born 1797)
- 1888 – Edward Lear, English poet and illustrator (born 1812)
- 1899 – Alfred Sisley, French-English painter (born 1839)

=== 1901–present ===
- 1901 – Eugène Louis-Marie Jancourt, French bassoonist, composer and pedagogue (born 1815)
- 1906 – Christian IX, King of Denmark (born 1818)
- 1910 – Édouard Rod, French-Swiss novelist (born 1857)
- 1912 – Herman Bang, Danish journalist and author (born 1857)
- 1916 – Sibylle von Olfers, German art teacher, author and nun (born 1881)
- 1917 – Evelyn Baring, 1st Earl of Cromer, British statesman, diplomat and colonial administrator (born 1841)
- 1923 – Elihu Vedder, American symbolist painter, book illustrator and poet (born 1836)
- 1928 – Douglas Haig, 1st Earl Haig, Scottish field marshal (born 1861)
- 1929 – Jacques Bouhy, Belgian baritone (born 1848)
- 1929 – Charles Fox Parham, American preacher and evangelist (born 1873)
- 1933 – Sara Teasdale, American poet (born 1884)
- 1934 – Fritz Haber, Polish-German chemist and engineer, Nobel Prize laureate (born 1868)
- 1934 – Dukinfield Henry Scott, British botanist (born 1854)
- 1935 – Frederick Samuel Dellenbaugh, American explorer (born 1853)
- 1940 – Edward Harkness, American philanthropist (born 1874)
- 1941 – Ioannis Metaxas, Greek general and politician, 130th Prime Minister of Greece (born 1871)
- 1944 – William Allen White, American journalist and author (born 1868)
- 1946 – Harry Hopkins, American businessman and politician, 8th United States Secretary of Commerce (born 1890)
- 1946 – Sidney Jones, English conductor and composer (born 1861)
- 1948 – Prince Aimone, Duke of Aosta (born 1900)
- 1951 – James Bridie, Scottish playwright, screenwriter and physician (born 1888)
- 1954 – Walter Conrad Arensberg, American art collector, critic and poet (born 1878)
- 1955 – Hans Hedtoft, Danish politician (born 1903)
- 1956 – H. L. Mencken, American journalist and critic (born 1880)
- 1959 – Pauline Smith, South African novelist, short story writer, memoirist and playwright (born 1882)
- 1960 – Mack Harrell, American operatic and concert baritone vocalist (born 1909)
- 1960 – George S. Messersmith, American diplomat (born 1883)
- 1961 – Angela Thirkell, English novelist (born 1890)
- 1962 – Fritz Kreisler, Austrian-American violinist and composer (born 1875)
- 1962 – William Francis Gray Swann, Anglo-American physicist (born 1884)
- 1963 – Robert Frost, American poet and playwright (born 1874)
- 1964 – Vera Hall, American folk singer (born 1902)
- 1964 – Alan Ladd, American actor (born 1913)
- 1965 – Jack Hylton, English pianist, composer, band leader and impresario (born 1892)
- 1966 – Pierre Mercure, Canadian composer, TV producer, bassoonist and administrator (born 1927)
- 1967 – Harold Munro Fox, English zoologist (born 1889)
- 1969 – Allen Dulles, American banker, lawyer, and diplomat, 5th Director of Central Intelligence (born 1893)
- 1969 - Max Weinreich, Russian-American-Jewish linguist and cofounder of YIVO (born 1894)
- 1970 – Lawren Harris, Canadian painter (born 1885)
- 1970 – B. H. Liddell Hart, French-English soldier, historian, and journalist (born 1895)
- 1973 – Johannes Paul Thilman, German composer (born 1903)
- 1974 – H. E. Bates, English writer (born 1905)
- 1976 – Jesse Fuller, American one-man band musician (born 1896)
- 1977 – Johnny Franz, English record producer and pianist (born 1922)
- 1977 – Freddie Prinze, American comedian and actor (born 1954)
- 1978 – Tim McCoy, American actor and military officer (born 1891)
- 1978 – Frank Nicklin, Australian politician, 28th Premier of Queensland (born 1895)
- 1979 – Sonny Payne, American jazz drummer (born 1926)
- 1980 – Jimmy Durante, American entertainer (born 1893)
- 1981 – Jack A. W. Bennett, New Zealander literary scholar (born 1911)
- 1981 – John Glassco, Canadian poet, memoirist and novelist (born 1909)
- 1982 – Rudolph Peters, British biochemist (born 1889)
- 1982 – Roger Stanier, Canadian microbiologist (born 1916)
- 1982 – Charles Sykes, British physicist and metallurgist (born 1905)
- 1983 – Stuart H. Ingersoll, American naval aviator, USN vice admiral (born 1898)
- 1984 – Frances Goodrich, American actress, dramatist and screenwriter (born 1890)
- 1984 – John Macnaghten Whittaker, British mathematician (born 1905)
- 1987 – Vincent R. Impellitteri, American politician and judge, 101st Mayor of New York City (born 1900)
- 1988 – James Rhyne Killian, American educator, scientist and White House advisor (born 1904)
- 1989 – Morton DaCosta, American theatre and film director, film producer, writer and actor (born 1914)
- 1991 – Yasushi Inoue, Japanese author and poet (born 1907)
- 1992 – Willie Dixon, American singer-songwriter and producer (born 1915)
- 1993 – Adetokunbo Ademola, Nigerian lawyer and jurist, 2nd Chief Justice of Nigeria (born 1906)
- 1994 – Ulrike Maier, Austrian skier (born 1967)
- 1999 – Lili St. Cyr, American model and dancer (born 1918)
- 2002 – Harold Russell, Canadian-American soldier and actor (born 1914)
- 2003 – Frank Moss, American lawyer and politician (born 1911)
- 2004 – Janet Frame, New Zealand author and poet (born 1924)
- 2005 – Ephraim Kishon, Israeli author, screenwriter, and director (born 1924)
- 2006 – Nam June Paik, South Korean-American artist (born 1932)
- 2008 – Margaret Truman, American singer and author (born 1924)
- 2009 – Hélio Gracie, Brazilian martial artist (born 1913)
- 2009 – John Martyn, British singer-songwriter and guitarist (born 1948)
- 2011 – Milton Babbitt, American composer, educator, and theorist (born 1916)
- 2012 – Ranjit Singh Dyal, Indian general and politician, 10th Lieutenant Governor of Puducherry (born 1928)
- 2012 – Oscar Luigi Scalfaro, Italian lawyer and politician, 9th President of Italy (born 1918)
- 2012 – Camilla Williams, American soprano and educator (born 1919)
- 2015 – Colleen McCullough, Australian neuroscientist, author, and academic (born 1937)
- 2015 – Rod McKuen, American singer-songwriter and poet (born 1933)
- 2015 – Alexander Vraciu, American commander and pilot (born 1918)
- 2016 – Jean-Marie Doré, Guinean lawyer and politician, 11th Prime Minister of Guinea (born 1938)
- 2016 – Jacques Rivette, French director, screenwriter, and critic (born 1928)
- 2019 – George Fernandes, Indian politician (born 1930)
- 2019 – James Ingram, American musician (born 1952)
- 2021 – Walker Boone, Canadian actor (born 1944)
- 2022 – Howard Hesseman, American actor (born 1940)
- 2023 – Hazel McCallion, Canadian businesswoman and politician, 5th Mayor of Mississauga (born 1921)
- 2023 – Will Steffen, American-Australian chemist (born 1947)
- 2023 – Gero Storjohann, German politician (born 1958)
- 2025 – Salwan Momika, Iraqi refugee and anti-Islam activist (born 1986)
- 2025 – Richard Williamson, British Catholic traditionalist bishop (born 1940)
- 2025 – Victims in the 2025 Potomac River mid-air collision:
  - Vadim Naumov, Russian pair skater (born 1969)
  - Evgenia Shishkova, Russian pair skater and coach (born 1972)
  - Inna Volyanskaya, Russian pair skater (born 1965)
  - Alexandr Kirsanov, Russian ice dancer (born 1978)

== Holidays and observances ==
- Christian feast day:
  - Aphrahat
  - Gildas
  - Sabinian of Troyes
  - Sulpitius I of Bourges
  - Blessed Villana de' Botti
  - January 29 (Eastern Orthodox liturgics)
- Earliest day on which Fat Thursday can fall, while March 4 is the latest; celebrated on Thursday before Ash Wednesday. (Christianity)
- Kansas Day (Kansas, United States)
