= Fania Brancovskaja =

Lithuanian Jewish resistance member (1922–2024)

- Born: Fajga Jocheles; 22 May 1922; Kaunas, Lithuania
- Died: 22 September 2024 (aged 102); Vilnius, Lithuania
- Other names: Fania Brantsovsky
- Occupations: Teacher, librarian, statistician
- Spouse: Michail Brancovski
- Honours: Order of Merit of the Federal Republic of Germany; Order for Merits to Lithuania

Fania Brancovskaja (née Jocheles; 22 May 1922 – 22 September 2024) was a teacher, librarian, and statistician. During World War II, she was imprisoned in the Vilna Ghetto, later fighting in the ranks of the Jewish resistance and Soviet partisans. After Lithuania regained independence, she became involved in efforts to commemorate and preserve the legacy of Vilnius Jews.

== Biography ==
=== Pre-war period ===
She was born on 22 May 1922 in Kaunas, then the capital of Lithuania. She was the daughter of Beniamin Jocheles and his wife, Rachela née Gałuńska. Her father was an electromechanic by profession and worked at the railway power plant in Kaunas. She had a sister, Rywka (born in 1927). At birth, she was given the name Fajga, but from an early age, she was called by its Russian diminutive, Fania.

In 1927, a few months after the Lithuanian coup d'état, her father was arrested on charges of spying for Poland. Thanks to the efforts of a Lithuanian family friend, he was released from custody, but the Jocheles family was forced to leave Lithuania.

They moved to Vilnius, where her father became an electrotechnics teacher at a school run by a Jewish trade union. He also opened an electrical workshop called Dynamo. In Vilnius, she attended the coeducational Jewish high school of Zofia Gurewiczówna, where Yiddish was the language of instruction.

=== World War II ===
In October 1939, the Lithuanian occupation of the Vilnius Region began. Fania, who had graduated from high school that summer, moved to Grodno, which was then in the Soviet occupation zone. She enrolled in a teacher's college there. In early 1940, the Soviet authorities ordered her to relocate further from the border, to Novogrudok. She continued her teacher training there and joined the Komsomol. After completing her studies, she was assigned to Zharabkovichy, where she worked as a rural teacher, teaching Belarusian and Russian languages, history, and physical education.

In June 1941, she applied for admission to Vilnius University. According to Judith Leister, she also collaborated with the YIVO institute.

On 22 June 1941, Nazi Germany attacked the Soviet Union. Fania and her father attempted to flee eastward, but due to the rapid advance of the Wehrmacht, it proved impossible. They eventually returned to Vilnius, now occupied by the Germans. In September 1941, she and her family were imprisoned in the newly established Vilna Ghetto. Since her father, as an electrotechnician, was considered a skilled worker, the family was relatively safe for a time. Fania did odd jobs until she found permanent work in workshops organized by the occupiers within the ghetto.

She joined the Fareynikte Partizaner Organizatsye, which was established in January 1942. She participated in producing Molotov cocktails and in printing underground newspapers and leaflets. She also learned to handle weapons. On 23 September 1944, the day the final liquidation of the ghetto began, she escaped with a group of comrades to the Rūdninkai Forest, where they joined the Soviet partisans. Initially, she fought in the Adam Mickiewicz unit. Later, she joined the Za Pobiedu (For Victory) unit, led by Szmul Kapliński, which consisted mostly of Jews. She became the secretary of the local Komsomol cell. She fought with the partisans for nine months, until the Red Army recaptured the Vilnius Region.

During the Holocaust, she lost over 50 family members, including her father, who was murdered in the Klooga concentration camp, her mother, who was killed near Riga, and her younger sister, who died in the Stutthof concentration camp. The rest of her relatives were murdered in the Ponary massacre near Vilnius.

=== Post-war years ===
After the end of the German occupation, she remained in Vilnius. On 17 August 1944, she married Michail Brancovski, a fellow Vilnian Jew with whom she had fought in the same partisan unit. Initially, she worked as a secretary in one of the ministries of the Lithuanian SSR, while her husband became a manager at a factory. Both were members of the Lithuanian SSR delegation that participated in the Victory Parade on Red Square in Moscow in June 1945 (her husband was awarded the Medal "To a Partisan of the Patriotic War" during the event). In April 1945, after completing relevant courses, she began working at the central statistical office of the Lithuanian SSR. Her husband later held high-ranking positions in the economic ministries of the country.

Both became members of the Communist Party of the Soviet Union. They had two daughters. As she admitted years later, she and her husband consistently believed in socialism and the Soviet system, and thus never considered emigrating from the Soviet Union.

In December 1985, Michail Brancovski died of cancer. Five years later, Fania Brancovskaja retired.

After the dissolution of the Soviet Union and the restoration of Lithuania's independence, she began working at the Yiddish Institute founded in 2001 at Vilnius University. She organized and managed the institute's library. She was also active in the Jewish community in Vilnius. She was involved in various efforts to commemorate and preserve the legacy of Vilnius Jews, especially focusing on remembering the victims of the Holocaust and Jewish resistance fighters.

The Lithuanian prosecutor's office suspected her of involvement in the Koniuchy massacre (similar accusations were made against Yitzhak Arad and Rachel Margolis). In 2008, an attempt was made to question her about the matter, which was met with fierce criticism from the Israeli government and media. Ultimately, due to international protests, the investigation was dropped.

In 2009, she was awarded the Order of Merit of the Federal Republic of Germany. In 2017, she was awarded the Knight's Crosses of the Order for Merits to Lithuania. She died on 22 September 2024 and was buried in Antakalnis Cemetery.

== In culture ==
Fania Brancovskaja is the subject of the German documentary film Liza ruft! (Liza Calls!) from 2018, directed by Christian Carlsen.
