= List of massacres in Lithuania =

The following is a list of massacres that have occurred in Lithuania (numbers may be approximate):

Name	Date	Location	Deaths	Notes
First Mass Execution of the Jews of Gargždai	June 24, 1941	Gargždai	201	The mass execution of Jewish men from Gargždai was the first of more than 250 mass execution of Jews committed by the Nazis and their Lithuanian collaborators during the Holocaust in Lithuania
Rainiai massacre	June 24–25, 1941	Rainiai, near Telšiai	70–80	Mass murder of between 70 and 80 Lithuanian political prisoners by the NKVD, with help from the Red Army, in a forest near Telšiai during the night of June 24–25, 1941
Kaunas pogrom	June 25–29, 1941	Kaunas	5,000	
Seirijai massacre	June 26, 1941	Seirijai	50	
Pryšmančiai massacre	June–September 1941	Pryšmančiai, near Kretinga	around 432	
Lygumai massacre	August 1941	Lygumai	180+	about 80 men and over 100 women and children Jews were mass murdered by German Einsatzgruppen and local collaborators.
Strošiunai massacre	August 1941	Strošiunai, near Kaišiadorys	1,911 Jews	
Obeliai massacre	August 25, 1941	Obeliai	1,160 Jews	
Liaudiškiai massacre	August 25–26, 1941	Liaudiškiai, near Šeduva	664 Jews	
Pakralė massacre	September 4, 1941	Pakralė, near Seredžius	193 Jews	
Baraučiškė massacre	September 10–11, 1941	Baraučiškė, near Seirijai	953 Jews	
Semeliškės massacre	October 6, 1941	Semeliškės	962 Jews	
Kaunas massacre	October 29, 1941	Kaunas	9,200	
Koniuchy massacre	January 29, 1944	Koniuchy (now Kaniūkai)	34	In the territory of pre-WW2 Poland, now in Lithuania.
Ponary (Paneriai) massacre	July 1941 - August 1944	Paneriai, Vilnius	100,000	In the territory of pre-WW2 Poland, now in Lithuania.
Pirčiupiai massacre	3 June 1944	Pirciupie (now Pirčiupiai)	119	In the territory of pre-WW2 Poland, now in Lithuania.
Glinciszki massacre	20 June 1944	Glitiškės	27	In the territory of pre-WW2 Poland, now in Lithuania.
Dubingiai massacre	23 June 1944	Dubingiai	20-27	
Draučiai shooting	February 15, 1998	Draučiai	10 (including shooter)	While the government initially suspected political motives, it turned out that it was most likely the result of mental illness.
