= Sakovich =

Sakovich, Sakovič, or Sakowicz is a surname of Polish or Belarusian origin with variants in a number of other languages.

Language	Masculine	Feminine
Polish	Sakowicz ([saˈkɔvit͡ʂ], Sakowich (translit.)	Same
Lithuanian	Sakovičius, Sakavičius	Sakovičienė, Sakavičienė (married); Sakovičiūtė, Sakavičiūtė (unmarried)
Belarusian (Romanization)	Caкoвіч, Sakovič, Sakovich, Sakovitch	Same
Russian (Romanization)	Caкoвич; Sakovich, Sakovitch	Same
Ukrainian (Romanization)	Caкoвич; Sakovych, Sakovyč	Same

Notable people with this surname include:

- Kazimierz Sakowicz (1899–1944), Polish journalist
- Jon Sakovich (born 1970), American swimmer
- Nancy Anne Sakovich (born 1961), Canadian actress and model
