= Lithuanian collaboration with Nazi Germany =

Lithuanian collaboration with Nazi Germany took place during World War II, primarily on the territory of Lithuania during its occupation by German forces from 1941 to 1944.

Collaboration and cooperation with Nazi Germany among Lithuanians had various causes. The main reason was the experience of the brutal Soviet occupation, which automatically directed the hopes and aspirations of Lithuanians toward Nazi Germany. In general, Lithuanians saw in cooperation with the Germans an opportunity to realize their own national goals; although few deluded themselves that the Germans would restore full independence to the Lithuanians, the hope of receiving some form of autonomy was widespread, as well as support in conflicts with other ethnic groups under German occupation, such as Poles and Belarusians. Lithuanian collaboration covered a wide spectrum of postures from the politically motivated conditional cooperation to complete identification with the goals of the occupier, genuine collaboration.

The German army was welcomed by the Lithuanian population in June 1941 with joy and as liberators. At that time, the level of collaboration and cooperation with the Germans was at its highest and usually undertaken completely voluntarily. Enthusiasm subsided, however, as early as the fall of 1941 when hopes for the creation of any Lithuanian autonomy proved illusory. The next turning point was the defeat at Stalingrad suffered by Germany in early 1943, from which point Germany's defeat in the war seemed inevitable. From then on, the resentment of the Lithuanian population against the increasingly oppressive occupiers grew. Attempts to draw new groups into collaboration generally failed, emblematic of which was the failed attempt to form a Lithuanian Waffen-SS legion. Only the looming Soviet threat, which for many Lithuanians still seemed more lethal than the German occupation, became a field for new collaboration. The recruitment success of the Lithuanian Territorial Defense Force was precisely the fruit of cooperation on this front. It ended, however, with the brutal disbanding of the unit after it refused to defend Germany itself.

Despite the changing sentiment, Lithuanian police formations and Lithuanian administrative personnel continued to collaborate throughout the entire war. Among the former, the Lithuanian Auxiliary Police and special units such as the Lithuanian TDA Battalion, which took an active part in Holocaust crimes and mass murder of civilians, were particularly notorious.

== Background ==
At the beginning of World War II, which began with the German invasion of Poland on September 1, 1939, Lithuania remained a neutral country. However, after Poland's defeat, pressure intensified on Lithuania, which was forced to sign the mutual assistance pact of October 10, 1939, with the Soviet Union, making it a de facto Soviet protectorate. Under this agreement, however, Lithuania received part of the Vilnius region, which had previously been part of Poland. On June 15, 1940, all of Lithuania was occupied and absorbed into the Soviet Union.

The period of Soviet occupation led to a strengthening of negative feelings toward national minorities in Lithuania, especially Jews. During the Soviet occupation, tensions between Lithuanian Jews and ethnic Lithuanians increased significantly, as the former often welcomed the incoming Soviet power, and their situation improved under it. Ethnic Lithuanians, on the other hand, were proportionately more often victims of Soviet repression, as a result of which many of them began to see Germany as an ally and liberator. This led to a significant increase in anti-Semitic sentiment. This was reinforced by the belief, not based on facts, that there was significant Jewish involvement in the Soviet administration and terror apparatus. There was a widespread view that the collapse of independent Lithuania was caused by "Jewish treason," while the deportations were organized by the "Jewish-Soviet NKVD". Also strained relations prevailed between Lithuanians and Poles, who often viewed the Lithuanians as third occupiers of their country.

The Soviet occupation triggered a strong anti-Soviet resistance movement that resulted in an armed uprising in June 1941, at the time of the German invasion of the USSR. Most of the later pro-Nazi collaborators had previously been members of the anti-Soviet resistance movement. However, anti-Sovietism was not the only factor that attracted people to the Nazis; fascination with corporatism, social discipline, economic and racial anti-Semitism, and the vision of building a Axis Europe were also important.

== History of Lithuanian collaboration ==
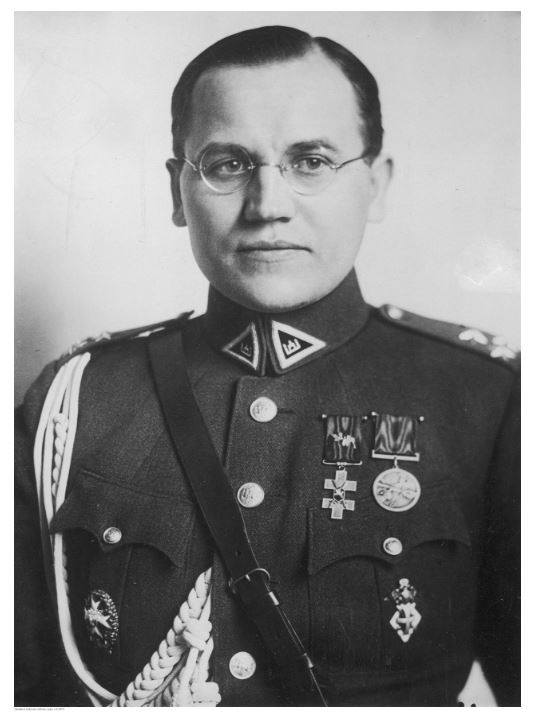
Kazys Škirpa, one of the main founders of Lithuanian Activist Front

=== Lithuanian Activist Front ===
On November 17, 1940, a group of émigrés formed the Lithuanian Activist Front (LAF) in Berlin, headed by former Lithuanian envoy in Berlin Colonel Kazys Škirpa. Formally founded as an alliance of all anti-communist parties, it quickly assumed militant nationalist positions. In opposition to it remained exiled in USA former president Antanas Smetona and many Lithuanian diplomats of the older generation, associated with the Smetona regime and generally opposed to Nazi ideology.

The LAF drew its ideological roots in the pre-war Lithuanian Activist Movement (LAS), whose leader philosopher Antanas Maceina was the LAF's ideological guide. LAS advocated cooperation with the axis and preached fascist-like and anti-Semitic views. Another more radical LAF ideologue was intellectual Bronys Raila, an activist in the nationalist movement before the war, wrote a draft program for the LAF in which he advocated the overthrow of "democratism," the unification of Lithuanians and Latvians to create a "united Aestian ideal" and an alliance with Germany. He also demanded that Lithuania be cleansed of "Jews, parasites and traitors," that Jews be deprived of their property and expelled. In their resolutions LAF denied the Lithuanian Jews a place in the future Lithuanian state, and also annulled medieval settlement privileges, thus excluding the Jews from Lithuanian statehood.

Although the LAF was headquartered in Berlin it also tried to operate in the occupied country, but contacts with LAF activists in Lithuania were limited, maintained through a handful of couriers. It is difficult to assess how much the center in Berlin influenced the sentiment in the country and vice versa. It is possible that the LAF's growing anti-Semitic attitude was an effect of the mood in the Soviet-occupied country.

=== June Uprising and anti-Jewish violence ===
The LAF organized an underground network in Soviet-controlled Lithuania. The intelligence and sabotage operations they provided were helpful to the Germans once the invasion of the Soviet Union began. However, the LAF also had its own goals; the uprising they organized, aimed primarily at capturing Kaunas and Vilnius before the Germans, was designed to present them with a fait accompli and force them to recognize at least Lithuanian autonomy. The uprising proved successful. The Lithuanian population, driven to despair by the last wave of deportations of some 20,000 people on June 14-17, 1941, just a week before the German invasion of the USSR, rose enthusiastically against the Soviets and their supporters.

The LAF formed uniformed paramilitary units in Kaunas and Vilnius. They were to support the formed provisional government headed by Juozas Ambrazevičius and became the basis of the future Lithuanian army. These units were transformed by the Germans into the Aufbaudienst and were subordinated to the German Ordnungspolizei. In addition to these units, there were many less regular partisan forces, operating independently. From the very beginning, they organized or participated in pogroms against the Jewish population and in the plundering of their property. The insurgents also clashed with Red Army units and Communist militias, and nearly a thousand insurgents were killed in such battles.

German forces, primarily Einsatzgruppe A, began the process of exterminating the Jewish population in the first hours of the invasion. They found many auxiliaries among the Lithuanian formations. Among them were partisan divisions, as well as units of the reconstituted Lithuanian police, and elements of the civilian local administration. The Provisional Government or LAF although they claimed sovereignty, their real power was severely limited. They contributed to the spread of anti-Jewish violence with their anti-Semitic rhetoric, although not directly calling for slaughter. The provisional government issued the Statutes on the Situation of the Jews on August 1, 1941, in which they restricted the civil rights of Jews and forced them to wear distinctive badges.

The provisional government was dissolved on 5 August 1941 and LAF was banned by Germans on 26 September 1941.

=== Involvement in the extermination of the Jews in Lithuania ===
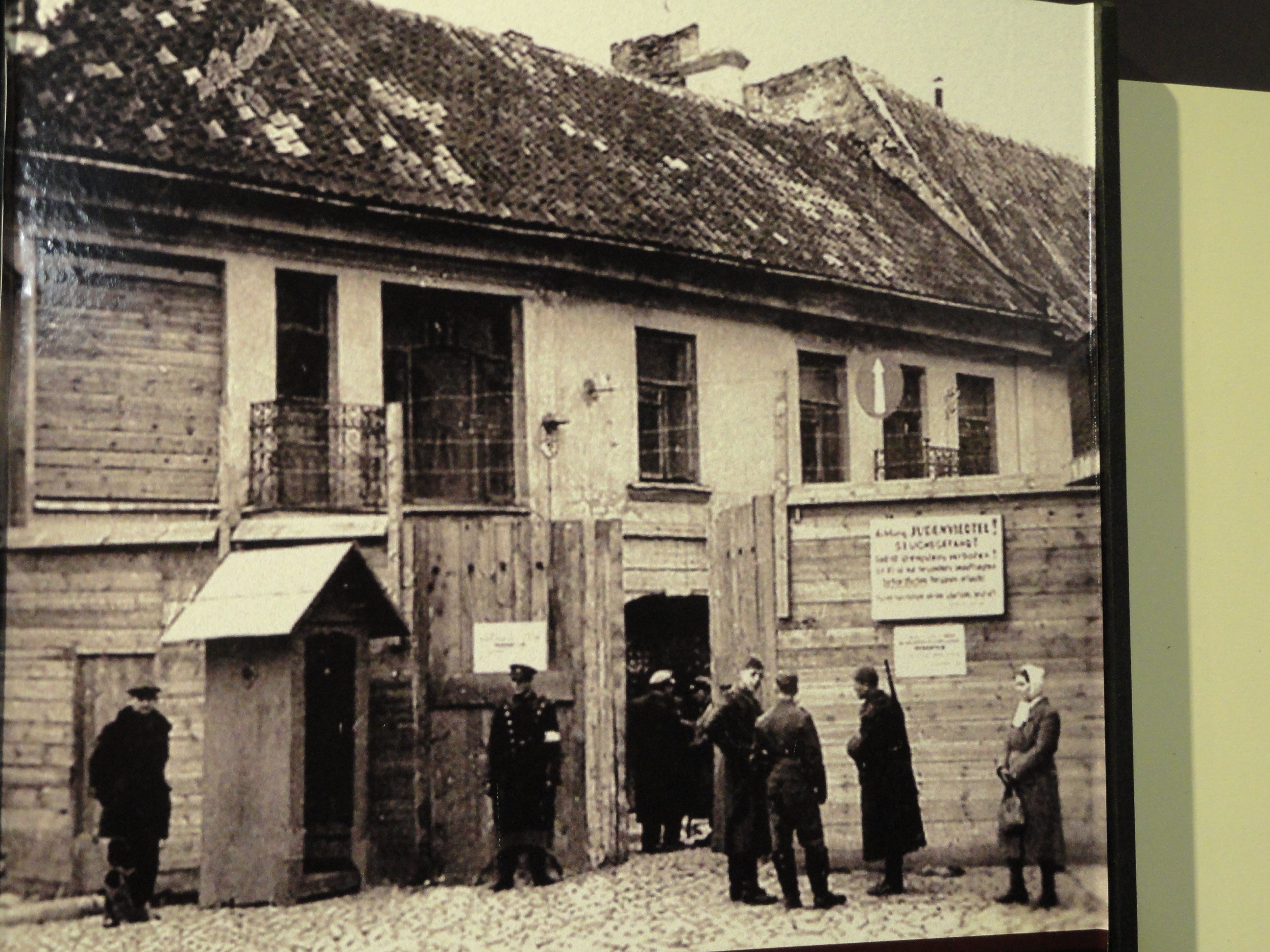
Main entrance to the Vilna Ghetto

After the first wave of spontaneous anti-Jewish violence of the early summer of 1941, came a phase of planned extermination of the Jewish population, which happened between August and October 1941. In this German-managed process, most of the personnel were locals, primarily former partisans and police officers. In August 1941, the Lithuanian police, led by Col. Vytautas Reivytis, began collecting data on Jewish communities, and then, on the basis of Secret Circular No. 3, began the process of gathering Jews for "transportation to camps."

The National Labor Service (TDA) battalion, recruited mainly from Lithuanian Red Army deserters, played a crucial role in the process of extermination. Officers were mainly Voldemarists, Nazi-like extreme nationalists, grouped in the Lithuanian Nationalist Party.

Detached from TDA contingent, commanded by Bronius Norkus, as a part of Rollkommando Hamann, was responsible for the deaths of at least half of the 125,000 Jews killed in Lithuania between August 1 and December 1, 1941. Most of them in the countryside. In Ponary, near Vilnius, the killings were carried out by the Special Squad of the German Security Police and SD, known as Ypatingasis būrys. TDA units were active in Kaunas, including the October 28, 1941 massacre of 10,000 Jews at the Ninth Fort in Kaunas. This was the largest single massacre of Jews in Lithuania. In addition, other battalions of the Lithuanian auxiliary police, but also local policemen, and other auxiliaries who which less frequently took part in the murder of Jews, but often played a secondary role, security, guarding, and also took part in hunting Jews.

Lithuanian police battalions were also involved in mass murders in Belarus, Ukraine, and northwest Russia. The 2nd and 252nd auxiliary police battalions were also sent to Poland for guard duty at the Majdanek concentration camp. Probably the largest action of the Lithuanian police against the non-Jewish population was the murder of some 400 Poles in the Święciany massacre in May 1942. During the war, between 13,000 and 15,000 served in the 28 battalions of the Lithuanian auxiliary police.

=== Administration ===
The Germans, after the frontline fighting had died down, organized their own administration in Lithuania. The General Region (Generalbezirk) of Lithuania was established, headed by Generalkommissar Theodor Adrian von Renteln. Together with the other Baltic states, it formed the Reich Commission East (Reichskommissariat Ostland), headed by Hinrich Lohse. The Lithuanian division of local administration of June 1940, restored by the Lithuanian insurgents, was preserved, and the positions were also retained by the local Lithuanian activists they elevated to power. The Germans employed 900 people in the civil administration in early 1944, in addition, about 20,000 Lithuanians worked in their own administrative bodies. The administrative apparatus was headed by Gen. Petras Kubiliūnas. Kubiliūnas based the administrative apparatus on former members of the Provisional Government and Voldemarists.

The Lithuanian municipal administration was responsible for contacts with Jewish ghettos, as the Germans avoided direct contact with Jews. They also influenced the territorial layout of the ghettos, and was also responsible for the provisioning and security of the ghettos. In the Vilnius region, the Lithuanians used their influential role in the administration to close Polish schools and cultural institutions, Lithuanianize education, and dismiss Polish employees from the administration. The Lithuanian Security Police also collaborated with the Germans in combatting the Polish underground. Similar measures were aimed at Belarusians.

Enthusiasm for German rule among the Lithuanian population waned in 1942, due to disillusionment with the lack of real political autonomy, as well as the growing burden of the occupation itself. The first underground organizations appeared. However, much of the Lithuanian administrative and police apparatus continued to operate under German authority until the end of the war.

=== Litauische Sonderverbände ===
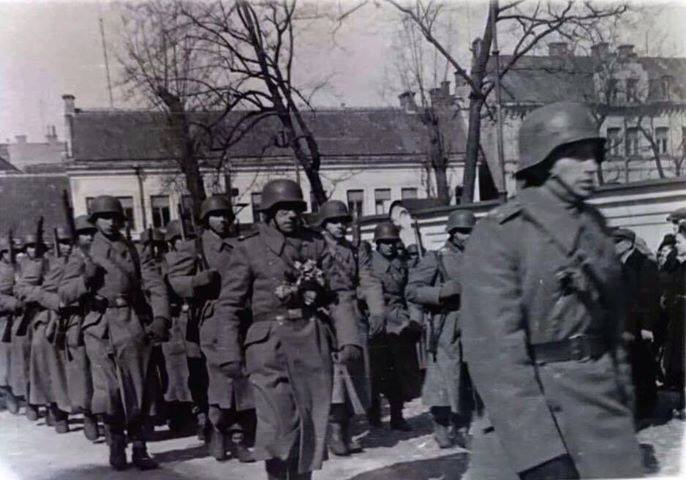
Men of the Litauische Sonderverbände marching into Vilnius, April 1 1944

After an unsuccessful attempt to create a Lithuanian Waffen-SS unit, the Germans attempted to create a military unit of a different kind, in which Lithuanians were to have a little more autonomy, and the unit itself was to be used only within Lithuania to fight Soviet and Polish partisans. The Germans called this unit Lithuanian Special Organizations (Litauische Sonderverbände), while in Lithuanian it was called Local Selection (Vietinė rinktinė). It was headed by pre-war Lithuanian general Povilas Plechavičius. Recruitment for the unit, announced on February 16, 1944, was voluntary and was a complete success and gathered about 20,000 men. The formation of the unit was also supported by the Lithuanian underground. The unit was mostly broken up by the Polish Home Army and then brutally disbanded by the Germans for refusing to defend Germany itself.

A significant number of Local Selection members escaped into the forests, but some were conscripted by the Germans into the army, mainly to serve in Luftwaffe auxiliary units. At the beginning of 1945, 37,000 Lithuanians were serving in the ranks of various branches of the German police and army.

== See also ==
- Collaboration with Nazi Germany and Fascist Italy

== Bibliography ==
- Bubnys, Arūnas (2017). "The Lithuanian Schutzmannschaft Battalions". In Böhler, Jochen; Gerwarth, Robert (eds.). The Waffen-SS. A European History. Oxford. ISBN 978-0-19-879055-6.
- Sužiedėlis, Saulius (1990). "The military mobilization campaigns of 1943 and 1944 in German-occupied Lithuania: Contrasts in resistance and collaboration". Journal of Baltic Studies. 21 (1): 33–52. doi:10.1080/01629778900000231. ISSN 0162-9778.
- Sužiedėlis, Saulius (2006). "Lithuanian Collaboration during the Second World War: Past Realities, Present Perceptions". In Tauber, Joachim (ed.). "Kollaboration" in Nordosteuropa: Erscheinungsformen und Deutungen im 20. Jahrhundert (PDF). Wiesbaden.
- Tauber, Joachim (2021). "Collaboration in Lithuania". In Bitunjac, Martina; Schoeps, Julius H. (eds.). Complicated Complicity: European Collaboration with Nazi Germany during World War II. Walter de Gruyter GmbH & Co KG. ISBN 978-3-11-067118-6.
- Wnuk, Rafał (2018). Leśni bracia. Podziemie antykomunistyczne na Litwie, Łotwie i w Estonii 1944-1956 [Forest Brothers. Anti-communist underground in Lithuania, Latvia and Estonia 1944-1956] (in Polish). Lublin: Instytut Europy Środkowo-Wschodniej. ISBN 978-83-60695-90-6.
