= Kazimierz Sakowicz =

Polish journalist (1894–1944)

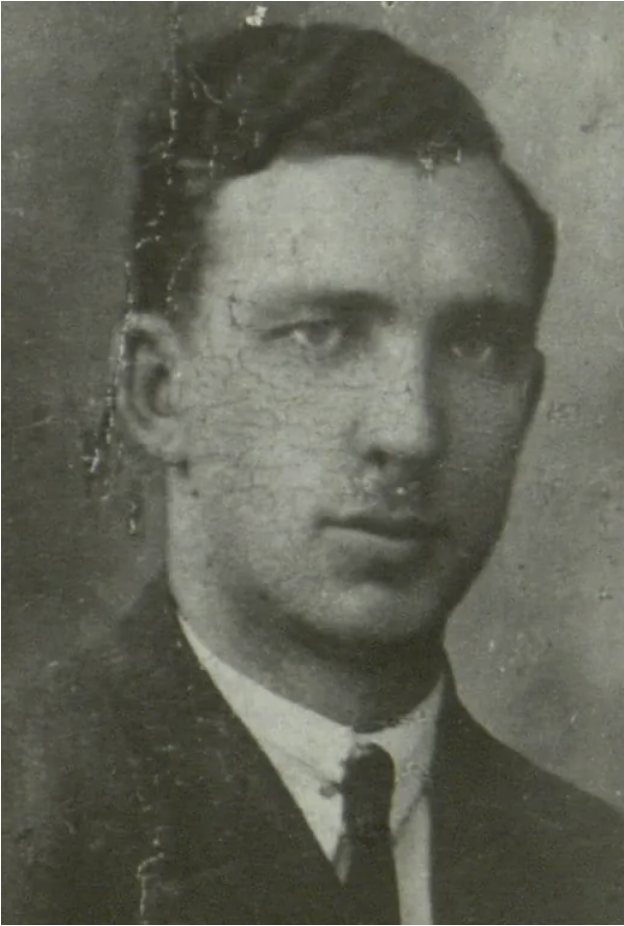
- Kazimierz Sakowicz
- Born: Missing required parameter 1=month! , 1894; Vilnius, Russian Empire
- Died: July 5, 1944 (aged 49–50); Vilnius, Lithuania
- Resting place: Rasos Cemetery, Vilnius, Lithuania
- Education: Law
- Occupations: Journalist; soldier
- Notable work: Ponary Diary, 1941-1943
- Parent(s): Elias Sakowicz (father), Sofia Sakowicz (mother)

Kazimierz Sakowicz (1894 – July 5, 1944) was a Polish journalist, soldier and member of the Polish resistance against Nazism. A witness to the prolonged Ponary massacre in German-occupied Vilnius, he chronicled much of it in his diary, before being murdered in 1944. His diary, which he buried in his garden and parts of which were recovered and reconstructed after the war, was published several decades after his death under the title Ponary Diary (first, in Polish in 1999, and translated into English in 2005). It is a detailed record of that atrocity of the Second World War, in which about 100,000 Jews, Poles and Russians were murdered by Germans and Lithuanian collaborators.

== Biography ==
Sakowicz was born in Vilna in 1894, the son of Elias and Sofia Sakowicz, then in the Russian Empire. He studied law in Moscow. After his studies he returned to Vilna, where he began his journalistic career; Poland regained independence around that time in the aftermath of World War I. Sakowicz married a woman named Maria. Later, he became a newspaper publisher, operating a printing press in Vilna. He was an owner, editor and journalist of a newspaper called Przegląd Gospodarczy (Economic Review). He was also an officer of the pre-war Polish army.

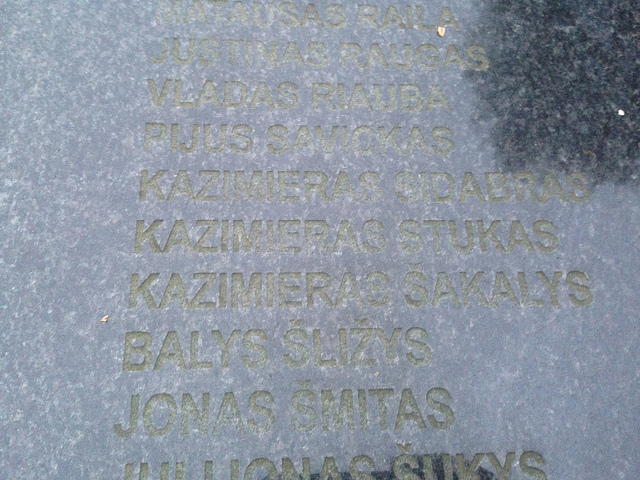
Gravestone of Sakowicz and others, with names rendered in Lithuanian

During the war he became a member of the Polish resistance (Armia Krajowa). Due to economic troubles during the German occupation, Sakowicz had to close his print shop and became a worker in a business dealing with animal skin and fur. He also had to move to a cheaper apartment in the outlying Ponary district. There he chronicled events of the Ponary massacre in his journal, which he buried in his garden. The notes that survive begin on 11 July 1941, and end on 6 November 1943. He observed the massacres from his attic window, approximately 100 meters from the execution site. In addition to observing the events, he interviewed other witnesses and even some of the Lithuanian perpetrators, whom he identified as associated with the Lithuanian nationalist organization, Lithuanian Riflemen's Union, and referred to as "Ponary Riflemen".

On 5 July 1944, during the increasing unrest in the area (Operation Tempest), he was shot and seriously wounded. While the exact circumstances of his shooting are not known, it is generally assumed that he was attacked by Lithuanian collaborators who discovered his interest in the massacre. He was found in the evening by his neighbours in a ditch, near his bicycle, and brought to St. Jacob Hospital in Vilna where he died ten days later. His grave is located in the Rossa Cemetery in Vilna, among graves of the fallen soldiers of the Polish Armia Krajowa underground.

== Ponary Diary ==
Sakowicz is known for his diary, published decades later under the title Ponary Diary, 1941-1943: A Bystander's Account of a Mass Murder (Dziennik pisany w Ponarach od 11 lipca 1941 r. do 6 listopada 1943 r.). It was first published in Poland in 1999 and thereafter translated into several languages: Hebrew in 2000; German in 2003; English in 2005; Lithuanian in 2012; Italian in 2018; and French in 2021.

This diary is reconstructed from writings that Sakowicz had buried in empty lemonade or soda water bottles in his garden. He wrote his diary on any paper he could obtain, including old school notebooks and yearbooks. Some of this writing is illegible or barely legible. Parts of his diary are considered lost as Sakowicz's record ends on 6 November 1943, but according to his family, he kept recording and writing his observations right up to the day of his mortal wounding. After the war, the bottles with his writings were dug up by his neighbours, who passed them on to a short-lived Jewish museum in postwar Vilna; later, the documents made their way to other museums as well as the Lithuanian Central State Archives. Several short fragments of the diary were published in the Lithuanian SSR in 1959 and 1966, and later in the Polish People's Republic during the trial of one of the perpetrators of the massacre, Viktoras Galvanauskas, who was living in Poland under the Polish name Wiktor Gilwanowski. In the early 1990s, fragments of the diary were delivered to the Polish Institute of National Remembrance by an anonymous member of the Polish minority in Lithuania, with a request to preserve the memory of this event from being forgotten.

The documents were eventually recovered and reconstructed by Lithuanian Jewish historian Rachel Margolis, whose family perished in the massacre, and who was at that time a director of the historical division of the Jewish State Museum of Lithuania. The foreword of the English edition noted that it "is one of the most shocking documents of its time", describing the murder of tens of thousands. She also speculated that "historians were denied access to the diary for many years, possibly because it provides evidence of the atrocities committed by the Lithuanians", and noted that some early transcriptions of the diary fragments published in Lithuania were imprecisely translated "apparently in order to diminish the role played by Lithuanian nationalists in the extermination of the Jews". Waldemar Franciszek Wilczewski likewise suggested that the fact that the last part of Sakowicz diary is missing might be the result of its destruction by Lithuanian perpetrators and collaborators, whose names and identities by that time Sakowicz was aware of, and might have recorded in that part of his diary. According to Dovid Katz, because of her work on the Sakowicz's diary, Margolis has been persecuted in Lithuania, where she has been "loathed by much of the nationalist academic establishment" and her work has "infuriat[ed] many elites in view of the revealed degree of participation in the genocide by local Lithuanian forces".

Yitzhak Arad writing in the preface of the English edition, which he helped edit, noted that "Sakowicz's diary is unique. No similar documentation has survived from any of the other mass murder sites at which Jews were shot [...] That Sakowicz's diary offers "objective" testimony from a bystander rather than from a victim, devoid of any emotional agenda that might call its credibility into question, places it among the most important of the Holocaust testimonies." François Guesnet reviewed the book for Zeitschrift für Ostmitteleuropa-Forschung in 2003. He noted that "Contrary to all customs, the earlier Polish edition is not mentioned anywhere [in the later Hebrew edition, which is nearly identical and clearly based on it], which can certainly be seen as a significant gesture in the shaping of historical memory". (Note: Original German: "Entgegen allen Gepflogenheiten wird die vorausgehende polnische Edition an keiner Stelle erwähnt, worin durchaus eine signifikante Geste in der Gestaltung historischen Gedächtnisses gesehen werden kann.")

== Ponary Diary editions ==
- Polish: Sakowicz, Kazimierz (1999). Rachela Margolis (ed.). Dziennik pisany w Ponarach od 11 lipca 1941 r. do 6 listopada 1943 r. (Biblioteka Wileńskich Rozmaitości, 15, nr 15 ed.). Bydgoszcz: Towarzystwo Miłośników Wilna i Ziemi Wileńskiej. ISBN 9788387865016.
- Hebrew: Sakowicz, Kazimierz (2000). Hrsg. von Dov Bergman (ed.). Vilna-Ponar. Adama l'lo elohim. 835 yame retsach am b'ti'ud haitonai hapolani A. Sakowicz. Netanja.
- German: Sakowicz, Kazimierz (2003). Jim G. Tobias, Raḥel Margolis (ed.). Die geheimen Notizen des K. Sakowicz: Dokumente zur Judenvernichtung in Ponary. Nürnberg: Antogo. ISBN 9783980663663.
- English: Sakowicz, Kazimierz (2005). Yitzhak Arad (ed.). Ponary Diary, 1941-1943. A Bystander's Account of a Mass Murder. New Haven and London: Yale University Press. ISBN 9780300108538.
- Lithuanian: Sakowicz, Kazimierz (2012). Panerių dienoraštis 1941-1943 m. Vilnius: Lietuvos gyventojų genocido ir rezistencijos tyrimo centras. ISBN 9786098037203.
- Italian: Sakowicz, Kazimierz (2018). Gigliola Bettelle (ed.). Diario di Ponary. Testimonianza diretta del genocidio ebraico in Lituania, 1941-1943. Milano - Udine: Mimesis Edizione. ISBN 9786098037203.
- French: Sakowicz, Kazimierz (2021). Alexandra Laignel-Lavastine (ed.). Journal de Ponary 1941-1943: Un témoignage oculaire unique sur la destruction des Juifs de Lituanie. Paris: Bernard Grasset. ISBN 9782246820871.

== See also ==
- Yitskhok Rudashevski, one of the Jewish victims of the massacre, author of a diary about his life in the Vilna Ghetto.
