= Ypatingasis būrys =

Lithuanian killing squad

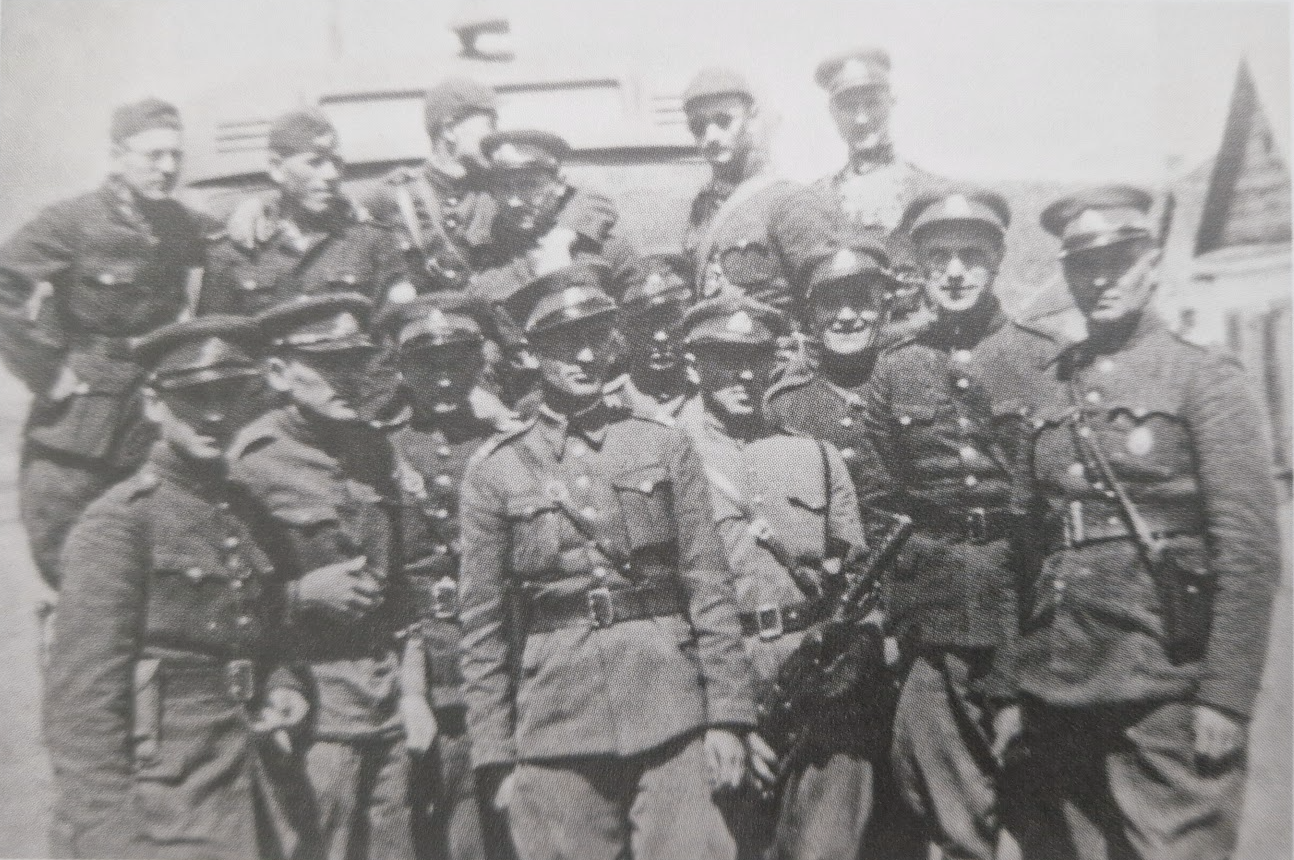
Ypatingasis būrys members in Vilnius, August 1941. Three German soldiers are at the back.

Ypatingasis būrys (lit. 'Special Squad' or 'Special Platoon', German: Sonderkommando) or Special Squad of the German Security Police and SD (Lithuanian: Vokiečių Saugumo policijos ir SD ypatingasis būrys) was a death squad operating in the Vilnius Region in 1941–1944. The unit, primarily composed of Lithuanian volunteers, was formed by the German occupation government and was subordinate to Einsatzkommando 9 and later to Sicherheitsdienst (SD) and Sicherheitspolizei (Sipo).^{p. 15} The unit was subordinated to German police, and had no official autonomy. In Polish they were colloquially called strzelcy ponarscy ("Ponary riflemen" in Polish).

== History ==
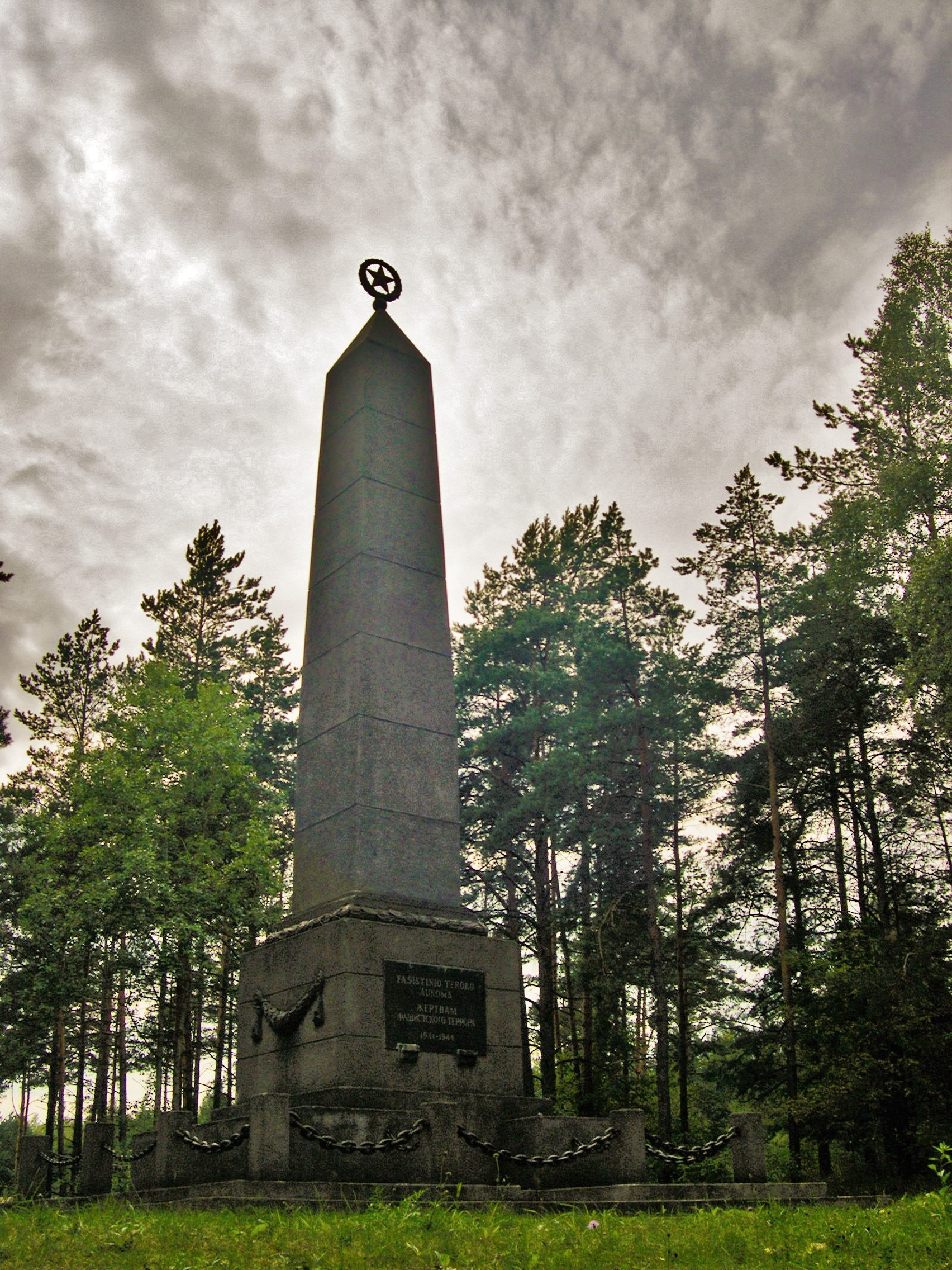
Original Soviet built memorial to the Soviet Victims in the Paneriai Woods

The Vilnian Special Squad (Lithuanian: Ypatingasis būrys) was first mentioned in documents dated 15 July 1941. The Special Squad (YB) began as police units formed when Lithuania was occupied by Germany in 1941. Lithuanian historian Arūnas Bubnys notes that it is difficult to confirm how many members the YB had and how many people they killed. Bubnys argues that the number of 100,000 victims attributed to the organization is inflated.

=== Composition and size ===
Many members were volunteers, particularly former members of the nationalistic paramilitary Lithuanian Riflemen's Union^{p. 12} It was composed primarily of Lithuanians, although according to Bubnys, a few Russians and Poles served as well.

Estimates differ regarding the size of the unit. Polish historian Czesław Michalski estimates that it grew from a base of 50 while Tadeusz Piotrowski asserts there were 100 volunteers at the onset. According to Michalski, at times it had hundreds of members. Bubnys says that it never exceeded a core of forty or fifty men. Of the members, 118 names are known; 20 have been prosecuted and sentenced. According to Bubnys, who cited the Polish historian Helena Pasierbska, during 1941–1944, approximately 108 men were members of the YB.

=== Role in the Holocaust ===
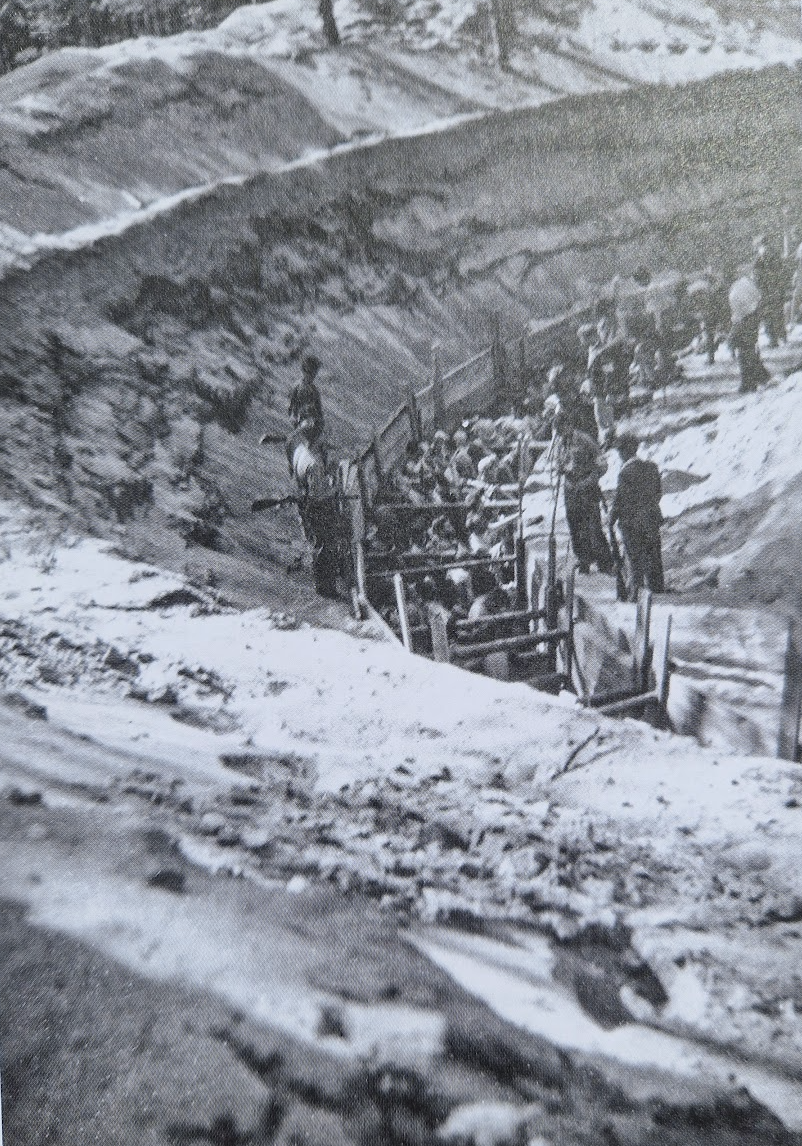
Massacre of Jewish men at the Ponary forest pits

The squad members were used as guards and took Jews from their apartments to the ghetto. The YB also guarded the Gestapo headquarters in Vilnius, the prison on present-day Gediminas Avenue, as well as the Paneriai base.

Together with the German military's Einsatzgruppen, the squad participated in the Ponary massacre, in which some 70,000 Jews were murdered, many from nearby Vilnius along with estimated 20,000 Poles and 8,000 Russian POWs. The YB was created to kill people and it killed people during its entire existence. It carried out most of the murders in 1941. The YB is known to have killed people in Paneriai, Nemenčinė, Naujoji Vilnia, Varėna, Jašiūnai, Eišiškės, Trakai, Semeliškės, and Švenčionys.

==== 1943 ====
When the Germans closed Vilnius' monasteries in 1943, the YB guarded their facilities until Germans removed the seized property. In 1943, the YB performed far fewer executions than in 1941–1942. Beginning in December 1943, Paneriai was guarded by an SS unit, and by 1944, according to Bubnys, the YB did not perform shootings in Paneriai.

Beginning in August 1943, the YB was renamed a squad of the 11th Battalion of the Latvian Legion. Their old identity documents were replaced with new documents from the Latvian Legion. Despite the formal change, the YB still served the German Security Police and SD.

==== 1944 ====
In July 1944, the YB was moved to Kaunas and stationed at Ninth Fort. There, the YB guarded the prison and before retreating, killed 100 prisoners. Afterward, the YB was moved to Stutthof, where it escorted Jews to Toruń. It stayed there until April 1945, when it received orders to convoy Jews to Bydgoszcz. However, the YB members fled from the approaching front and the Jewish prisoners escaped. Some YB members successfully retreated to Germany; some stayed in the zone occupied by Red Army.

== Uniforms ==
Squad members were issued Soviet weapons and white armbands. Some squad members were issued Lithuanian Army uniforms from warehouses, which were worn until 1942, when they were issued green SD uniforms with swastikas and skulls on their caps. Squad members were also issued SD identity cards.

== Commanders ==
Among the original organizers of the squad were junior lieutenants Jakubka and Butkus. After 23 July 1941, the commanding officer was Juozas Šidlauskas. In November 1941, lieutenant Balys Norvaiša, became the commander of the squad and his deputy was lieutenant Balys Lukošius. By the end of 1943, Norvaiša and Lukošius were deployed to a self-defence battalion and command of the YB was transferred to sergeant Jonas Tumas. The longest-serving commander of the YB was SS man Martin Weiss. Weiss not only directed executions, but killed victims personally. In 1943, Weiss was replaced by private Fiedler.

== Aftermath ==
Ten YB members were sentenced and executed by Soviet authorities in 1945 (Jonas Oželis-Kazlauskas, Juozas Macys, Stasys Ukrinas, Mikas Bogotkevičius, Povilas Vaitulionis, Jonas Dvilainis, Vladas Mandeika, Borisas Baltūsis, Juozas Augustas, and Jonas Norkevičius). In total, twenty YB members were convicted by Polish and Soviet authorities, four of them in Poland in the 70s. In 1972, Polish authorities arrested three men, one Polish (Jan Borkowski, who during the war used a Lithuanized version of his name, Jonas Barkauskas), and the other two of mixed Polish–Lithuanian ethnicity (Władysław Butkun a.k.a. Vladas Butkunas and Józef Miakisz a.k.a. Juozas Mikašius) and sentenced them to death. These sentences were later commuted to 25 years imprisonment. Other YB members died after the war or lived abroad.

== See also ==
- The Holocaust in Poland
- Holocaust in Lithuania
- Lithuanian Security Police
- Arajs Kommando, a similar unit composed of Latvians

== Bibliography ==
- Bubnys, Arūnas (2019). German security police and the SD Vilnius special squad 1941-1944. Vilnius: Genocide and Resistance Research Centre of Lithuania. ISBN 9786098037951.
- Šikšnianas, Mantas (2021). Saulius Sarcevičius ir Stanislovas Stasiulis (ed.). Ypatingasis būrys ir masinės žudynės Paneriuose (Nusikaltimų pėdsakai neišnyksta: masinės žudynės Panerių miške 1941–1944 metais ed.). Vilnius: Lietuvos istorijos institutas. ISBN 9786098183948.
