= Rachel Margolis =

Jewish Lithuanian historian

- Born: October 28, 1921
- Died: June 6, 2015 (aged 93)

Rachel Margolis (28 October 1921 – 6 July 2015) was a Lithuanian Holocaust survivor, partisan, biologist and Holocaust historian.

== Background ==
Margolis was born in Vilnius, Lithuania in 1921. Her parents were Jewish. In 1941, when the Nazis occupied Lithuania, Margolis was sent to live with a Christian family. She instead decided to voluntarily enter the Jewish Vilna Ghetto in September 1942. She entered the resistance movement there and became active in the underground. She joined the Fareynikte Partizaner Organizatsye, formed that same year by poet Abba Kovner. Margolis wrote

"Everyone was anxious to fight... Our mission was to acquire weapons, complete militarily preparations, all with the aim of provoking an uprising in the ghetto. If we perished it would be with honour, having proved to humanity that we are not sheep going meekly to the slaughter."

In June 1943, Heinrich Himmler commanded the extermination of the ghetto. 4000 Jewish residents were sent to death camps and killed; 4000 more were sent to labour camps. Margolis and her future husband were one of the few hundreds that survived the ghetto, by escaping to the surrounding forests. They contracted typhus but lived to continue their work with the resistance movement, joining a new unit and blowing up German infrastructure. Margolis was the only member of her family to survive the Holocaust . Her mother and brother perished in the Ponary massacre.

== Post war ==
After the war, Margolis gained a Ph.D. in biology and was a teacher until the end of the 1980s. She helped establish Lithuania's only Holocaust museum, the Green House in Vilnius. Her work in the resistance has been honoured by US congress and the British House of Lords.

Margolis's 2010 memoir A Partisan of Vilna recounts the author's escape from the Vilna Ghetto with the FPO (United Partisan Organization) resistance movement and the time spent in the forests of Lithuania with the partisans, active on sabotaging missions.

Margolis found and published the long-lost diary of Kazimierz Sakowicz, a Polish Christian journalist who witnessed the Ponary massacre outside Vilnius, where tens of thousands of Jews were murdered. Margolis reconstructed Sakowicz's diary from fragments of paper found in lemonade bottles, text written on a 1941 calendar and other papers held in archives that were not accessible under Soviet rule.

Beginning in 2008, the Lithuanian prosecutor general wanted to question Margolis as part of the investigation of the Koniuchy massacre when Soviet and Jewish partisans killed at least 38 civilians. Lithuanian newspapers referred to her as a terrorist and a murderer.

Margolis also lived in Rehovot, Israel.
