= Helena Pasierbska =

Polish writer (1921–2010)

Helena Pasierbska-Wojtowicz (1921 – 12 March 2010) was a Polish writer.

During the Second World War, she joined the Polish resistance organization (first Związek Walki Zbrojnej, later Armia Krajowa) and served as a courier and nurse. Took part in the Operation Ostra Brama. After the war, she became a teacher and also researched the Ponary massacre. She published several books as well as various articles, which appeared mostly in Nasz Dziennik.

She was also an honorary member of Polish Association in Lithuania (Związek Polaków na Litwie) and a leader of "Ponary Families" Association (Stowarzyszenie „Rodzina Ponarska”).

== Awards ==
In 1975, she was decorated with Armia Krajowa Cross and in 2004, she received the Polonia Mater Nostra Est award.

== Works ==
- Ponary. Wileńska golgota, Sopot, 1993
- Wileńskie Łukiszki na tle wydarzeń lat wojny 1939-1944, 2003, self-published, ISBN 978-83-906451-6-2
- Ponary i inne miejsca męczeństwa Polaków z Wileńszczyzny w latach 1941-1944 (Ponary and other places of martyrdom of Poles in Vilnius Region in the years 1941–1944), Łowicz, 2005.
- Ponary. Największe miejsce kaźni koło Wilna (1941-1944), Zarząd Ochrony i Konserwacji Zespołów Pałacowo-Ogrodowych, Warszawa, 1993, ISBN 83-85548-23-8

== Sources ==
- (in Polish) Short biography
