= Kaniūkai (Jakėnai) =

- Village
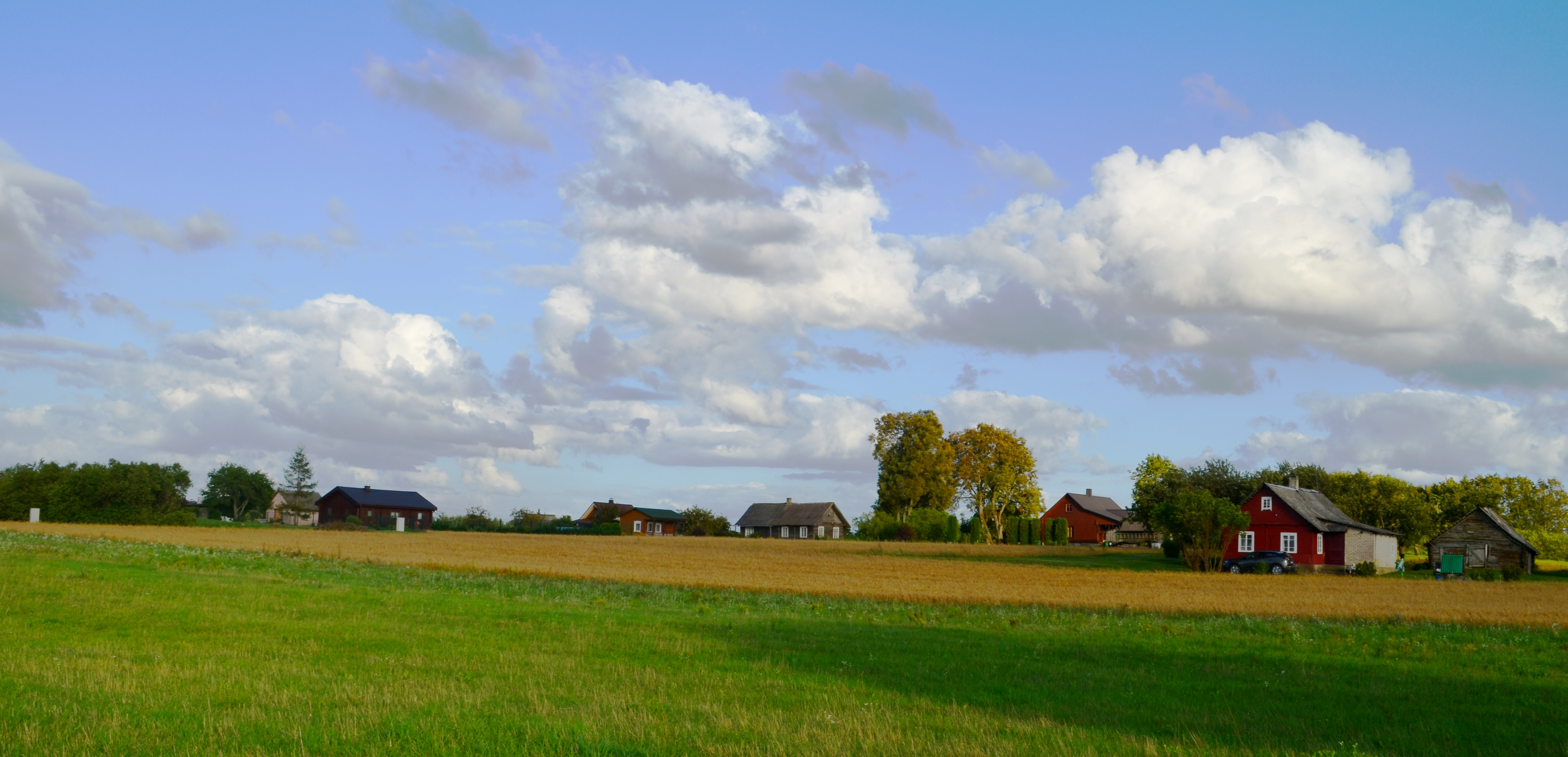

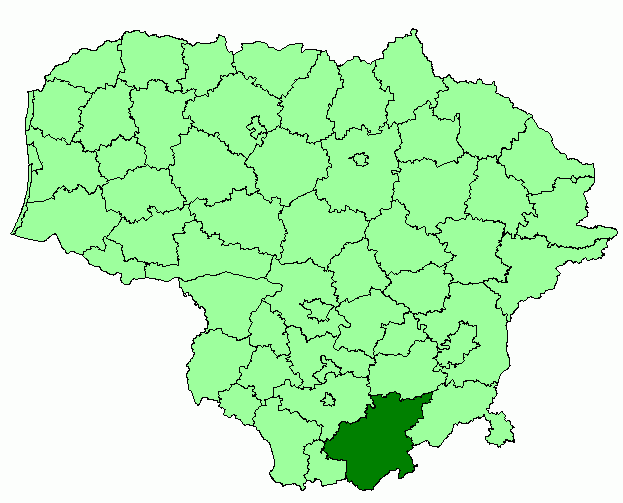
- Location in Varėna district municipality Location of Varėna district in Lithuania
- Coordinates: 54°24′50″N 24°40′52″E
- Country: Lithuania
- County: Alytus County
- Municipality: Varėna
- Eldership: Jakėnų

Population (2011 Census)
  - Total: 35
- Time zone: UTC+2 (EET)
  - Summer (DST): UTC+3 (EEST)

Kaniūkai is a village in Jakėnai eldership, Varėna District Municipality, in Alytus County, southeastern Lithuania. According to the 2001 census, the village had a population of 50 people. At the 2011 census, the population was 35.
