= Kaniūkai (Kaniava) =

- Village
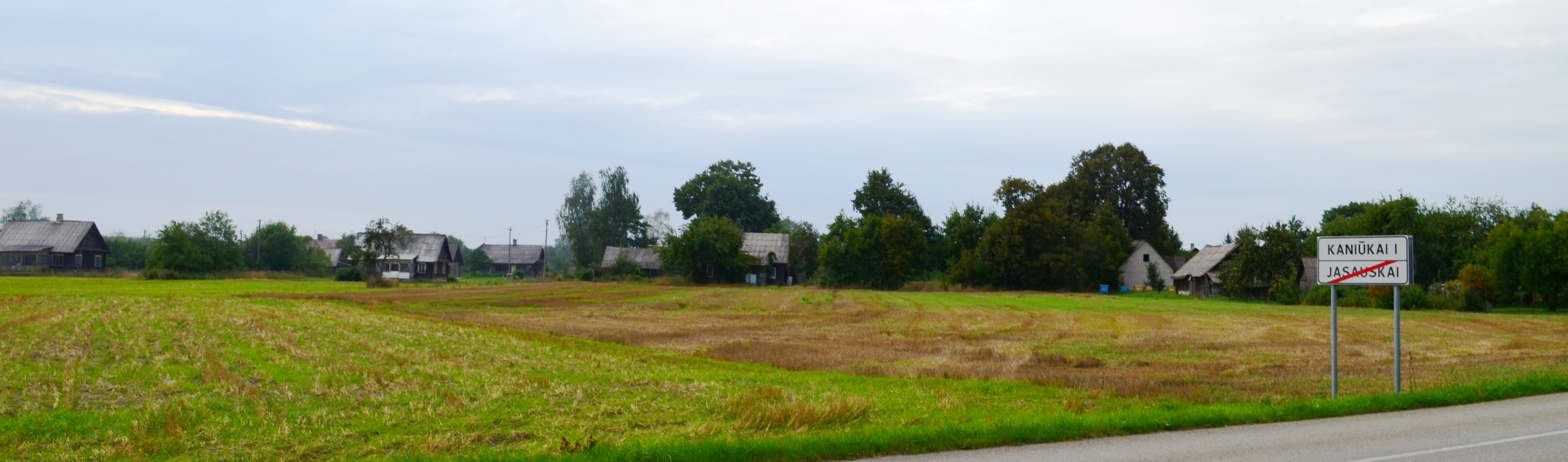

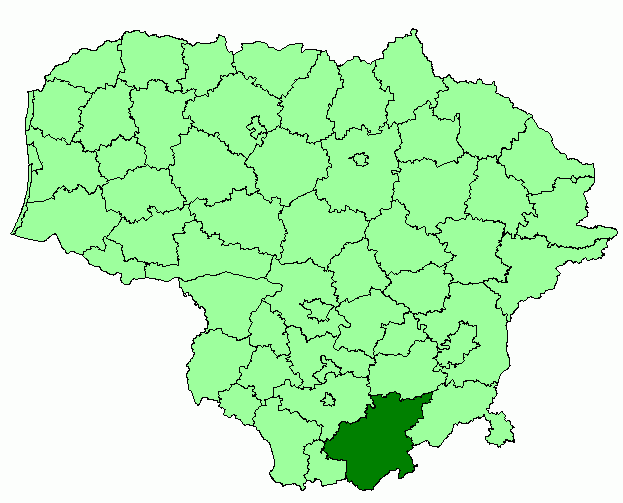
- Location in Varėna district municipality Location of Varėna district in Lithuania
- Coordinates: 54°06′29″N 24°45′29″E
- Country: Lithuania
- County: Alytus County
- Municipality: Varėna
- Eldership: Kaniavos (Kaniava)

Population (2011)
  - Total: 36
- Time zone: UTC+2 (EET)
  - Summer (DST): UTC+3 (EEST)

Kaniūkai is a village in Kaniavos eldership, Varėna district municipality, Alytus County, southeastern Lithuania. According to the 2001 census, the village had a population of 63 people. At the 2011 census, the population was 36.

== Etymology ==
The name Kaniūkai comes from Belarusian: конюх 'a stableman' or the same Belarusian personal name.
