= Draučiai shooting =

1998 shooting spree in Lithuania

- Leonardas Zavistonovičius

- Draučiai shooting (Lithuania)
- Location: 54.901°N 24.912°E; Draučiai, Lithuania
- Date: February 15, 1998; 4 p.m. – 4:30 p.m.
- Attack type: Shooting spree, mass murder
- Weapons: IZh-12 Double-barreled shotgun; ZKK-601 Bolt-action rifle with scope
- Deaths: 10 (including the perpetrator)
- Injuries: 1
- Perpetrator: Leonardas Zavistonovičius

The Draučiai shooting was a shooting spree that occurred in Draučiai, a small village in the Širvintos District Municipality, Lithuania on February 15, 1998, when 58-year-old Leonardas Zavistonovičius, a Polish local, killed nine civilians and wounded another, before being beaten to death. Due to the ethnicities of the perpetrator and the victims, it was speculated that the crime was politically motivated, but an investigation showed that Zavistonovičius had a severe mental illness, thus debunking the speculations.

== Shooting ==
At approximately 4 p.m. on Sunday, Zavistonovičius armed himself with a Russian hunting rifle IZH-12 and a Czech carbine ZKK-601 with telescopic sight. Both weapons were held legally with a permit renewed less than a year prior to the incident. Within the next half hour, he went to four houses, where he killed nine of his neighbours and their relatives, all of them with single shots to the head or chest.

Zavistonovičius first went to the most distant farm from his house. Its owner, Jonas Bareika, was shot and killed in his bed. He also shot Bareikas' partner Marytė Rutkauskienė, who, at the time, was making broom stalls. Afterwards, he approached Bareikas' neighbour Leonas Garbatavičius, whom he shot dead at the front door of his house. His next stop was at the Vrubliauskas farm, where he killed Vytautas Vrubliauskas and wounded his mother Jadvyga and sister Zofija. Zofija Vrubliauskaitė, who lived in Širvintos and came to visit the family on the weekend, died the same night in Širvintos hospital while undergoing surgery. Jadvyga Vrubliauskienė died a week later in Vilnius Red Cross Hospital.

The perpetrator then moved to Raudeliūnas' home, which was closest to his own house. The next victims were Vanda Raudeliūnienė and her visiting daughter Dalia Kalibatienė, who was a senior lieutenant with the Ministry of National Defence. The Kalibaitis family lived in Salininkai near Vilnius and were visiting the family. Zavistonovičius also killed a dog which attempted to defend the women. He fetched a mattress from his own house so he would not have to lay down and took cover to ambush Antanas Raudeliūnas, his son-in-law Mindaugas Kalibatas, and his grandsons Vilius and Tadas. The men were gathering wood in a nearby forest. They heard the shots, but were not immediately concerned, as they thought it came from hunters who frequented the forests. When the four men came out of the woods, Zavistonovičius first shot Mindaugas Kalibatas in the chest, but the bullet grazed, ripping a piece of flesh but not causing more serious internal damage. The perpetrator then shot Vilius as he ran to help his father. When the gunman approached them, Kalibatas and his other son Tadas attacked him, grabbed his rifles and beat him until he collapsed.

Since no one in the village owned a phone, Mindaugas Kalibatas drove himself and his son Vilius to a hospital in Širvintos located about 15 kilometres (9.3 mi) away; however, Vilius died en route. The hospital alerted the police and sent ambulances to the village. Zofija Vrubliauskaitė and Jadvyga Vrubliauskienė were found still alive. Zavistonovičius was taken into custody and died around 10 p.m. in the hospital due to a fracture in the base of his skull.

Only two inhabitants of the village were left alive, Antanas Raudeliūnas and Zavistonovičius' mother Juzefa.

== Victims ==
- Jonas Bareika, 40
- Marytė Rutkauskienė, partner of Jonas Bareikas
- Leonas Garbatavičius, 58
- Dalia Kalibatienė, 48
- Vilius Kalibatas, 17, son of Dalia Kalibatienė
- Vanda Raudeliūnienė, 66, mother of Dalia Kalibatienė
- Jadvyga Vrubliauskienė, 76
- Vytautas Vrubliauskas, 38, son of Jadvyga Vrubliauskienė
- Zofija Vrubliauskaitė, 42, daughter of Jadvyga Vrubliauskienė

== Aftermath ==
The Lithuanian government reacted speedily, as it was afraid the shooting spree was politically motivated and might provoke further violence. It occurred on the eve of the 80th anniversary of the Act of Independence of Lithuania. Zavistonovičius was a member of the Polish minority in Lithuania, which continues to have strained relationships with the Lithuanian government, while his victims were Lithuanian. Prime Minister Gediminas Vagnorius assembled a special commission to investigate the circumstances of the crime, while press secretary of president Algirdas Brazauskas attempted to convince the media to delay the news until Polish president Aleksander Kwaśniewski departed the celebrations in Vilnius. Minister of the Interior Vidmantas Žiemelis was sent to deliver government condolences in person. The government paid for the funerals of the victims. The funeral of the Kalibatis family in Salininkai was attended by many dignitaries, including Minister of National Defence Česlovas Stankevičius, members of the Seimas, and officers of the Lithuanian Army.

The results of the investigation were that the shooting spree was caused by a mental illness (chronic delusions similar to schizophrenia), and not a political agenda. Zavistonovičius held a gun for hunting since 1975. The permits were periodically renewed. As part of the renewal process, Zavistonovičius had to pass an examination by a psychiatrist. None of the psychiatrists who examined Zavistonovičius noticed anything suspicious, which caused much controversy. During the investigation, it was uncovered that in 1985, Zavistonovičius had been referred to and examined by the Vilnius Psychiatric Hospital. Zavistonovičius was married three times. His third wife separated from him just ten months before the shooting and described his morbid jealousy and persecutory delusions, even though neighbours saw him as an intelligent and helpful man. Relatives had begun noticing various symptoms since 1978, which may have been related to a car crash in 1976. In light of these findings, the prosecutor's office explored a possibility of charging the seven doctors who signed off on Zavistonovičius' gun permit with negligence. However, it was determined that the doctors were not negligent; without a centralized database, they could not know that Zavistonovičius was treated at a psychiatric hospital, and in public his symptoms were masked and controlled well enough to pass the brief examination without suspicion.
