= Koniuchy massacre =

World War II incident

Location of Kaniūkai in present-day Lithuania

The Koniuchy massacre (Polish: Zbrodnia w Koniuchach) or the Kaniūkai massacre (Lithuanian: Kaniūkų žudynės) was a World War II massacre of civilians, mostly women and children, carried out in the village of Koniuchy (now Kaniūkai, Lithuania) on 29 January 1944 by a Soviet partisan unit together with a contingent of Jewish partisans under Soviet command. At least 38 civilians who have been identified by name were killed, and more than a dozen were injured. In addition, houses were burned and livestock was slaughtered. It was the largest atrocity committed by the Soviet partisans in present-day Lithuania.

Sources on the massacre are scarce, fragmentary, and biased hindering objective evaluation of the events. Prior to the massacre, to defend from Soviet partisan raids, the village had formed an armed self-defense force with the encouragement and backing of the German-sponsored Lithuanian Auxiliary Police. The strength and role of this self-defense force is a matter of controversy. According to Soviet and Jewish sources, the force was large and well-armed and was a significant hindrance to the partisan activity in the vicinity. According to Lithuanian and Polish sources, the force was 25–30 men armed with a few rifles.

The events were investigated by authorities in Poland (2001) and Lithuania (2004). Lithuania opened a pretrial investigation against the former Jewish partisan Yitzhak Arad and sought to question other surviving Jewish veterans – the action was met with protests and accusations of hypocrisy and antisemitism. Lithuania closed the investigation in 2008; Poland closed its investigation in 2020. The massacre remains controversial and politically charged. Some coverage of this event has been criticized for exaggerating the role of the Jewish partisans in this raid; others for trying to minimize or justify the massacre.

== Historical background ==
Koniuchy, now known as Kaniūkai, is a village located in Lithuania near the Belarus–Lithuania border. Before World War II, it belonged to the Second Polish Republic and, after the Soviet invasion of Poland in September 1939, it was transferred to Lithuania according to the Soviet–Lithuanian Mutual Assistance Treaty. Lithuania was occupied by the Soviet Union in June 1940 and by Nazi Germany in June 1941. According to the census, carried out in August 1942 in Generalbezirk Litauen, the village had 374 people – 41 of them declared their nationality as Lithuanians, 17 as Poles, and the rest chose ambiguous "of Lithuania". Polish and Lithuanian authors disagree whether the village and the victims should be considered Polish or Lithuanian. Sometimes the victims are also described as Belarusian.

Soviet partisans became more active in the area in 1943. Koniuchy is located at the edge of the Rūdninkai forest, where partisan groups, both Soviet and Jewish, set up bases from which they attacked the German forces. The local Soviet partisans were commanded by Genrikas Zimanas and were subordinated to the Lithuanian section of the Central Headquarters of the Partisan Movement in Moscow chaired by Antanas Sniečkus. Starting in fall 1943, Soviet partisans were cut off from supplies from the Soviet Union. As per directives from Moscow, they were allowed to confiscate material goods from their opponents, and execute them. Unlike Polish partisans of the Home Army, these partisans did not enjoy widespread local support and could not depend on voluntary food contributions from local farmers. Therefore, Soviet partisans regularly raided nearby villages to rob the locals of food stock, cattle, and clothing. This raiding led to clashes between the farmers and the partisans. In response, German administration deployed Lithuanian Auxiliary Police Battalions in the area and provided weapons to self-defence units organized by villagers. This led to increased three-way hostilities between the Soviet partisans, Polish partisans, and Lithuanian police, with local residents caught in the middle and subject to arbitrary executions by any one of the three sides if suspected of aiding the "wrong" side.

== Events at Koniuchy ==
=== Village self-defense ===
As raiding intensified in the summer of 1943, men of Koniuchy organized an unarmed night guard. In early fall 1943, the village was visited by four Lithuanian policemen and the men agreed to organize an armed self-defence group. According to later testimony by its leaders, the group grew from an initial 5 or 6 members to 25–30 men. There is no reliable data on the group's weapons. Soviet sources, trying to justify the massacre, claimed that the village had three machine guns and automatic rifles. One of the leaders of the village self-defence unit, Vladislavas Voronis, in his post-war trial by NKVD, trying to minimize his anti-Soviet activities, claimed that the group had only eight rifles and ten sawed-off shotguns. Rimantas Zizas evaluated both claims as unlikely and claimed that at least some weapons should have been provided by the Lithuanian policemen of the 253rd Police Battalion which had an outpost in Naujosios Rakliškės. Similarly, there is no agreement on fortifications of the village. Memoirs by Jewish partisans claim that the village was fortified with trenches and watch towers and even had a German contingent; these claims are refuted by Polish and Lithuanian authors.

There were several incidents between the partisans and the men of Koniuchy. In October 1943, a group of six armed Soviet partisans took three cartloads worth of food, clothes, and other items. The villagers stopped the partisans on a bridge over Šalčia and took back the property. There is some evidence that two partisans were killed in the incident. In January 1944, a Soviet partisan was killed in Didžiosios Sėlos in an operation by the Lithuanian Auxiliary Police that involved a few men from Koniuchy. Soviet sources claimed that the partisan was captured, transported to Koniuchy, tortured, and later executed. Similarly, Soviet sources implicated men from Koniuchy in attacks on Soviet partisans in Visinčia and Kalitonys. Post-war testimony by locals shows that the partisans sent two or three open letters to the residents of Koniuchy urging them to surrender their weapons and cease anti-partisan activities, and vowing reprisals if they refused.

The partisan view of the village was summed up in a November 2008 interview by Sara Ginaitė, former Jewish partisan and a professor at York University, who stated that the village had a "record of hostility to the partisans" and that "the villagers were not unarmed civilians, but rather collaborators and combatants against Soviet partisans". The collaboration was denied by the villagers who claimed that only a few men in the village were armed with rifles for self-protection.

=== Massacre and different accounts ===
On 29 January 1944, around 5 a.m., the village was attacked by Soviet partisan units under the command of the Central Headquarters of the Partisan Movement in Moscow. The order to attack was given by Genrikas Zimanas. The raid was carried out by 100–150 partisans from various units including Jewish partisans. According to Zimanas report of 31 January, the attack was carried out by partisans from the so-called Vilnius Brigade, "Death to Occupiers" (part of Kaunas Brigade), "Margiris", and a special group of the GRU of the General Staff of the Red Army (also known as Platoon no. 14). The Vilnius Brigade included partisan groups "Death to Fascism", "Avengers", "To Victory", "Fight", "Thunder", and a unit named after Adam Mickiewicz). A log of partisan activity recorded that 30 fighters from "Avengers" and "To Victory" participated in the massacre.

Rimantas Zizas identified captain Michaił Cejko from the "Death to Occupiers" unit as the commander of the attack. Cejko claimed the command in his autobiography completed in August 1944 and the command was mentioned when he was awarded the Order of the Patriotic War (2nd class) in April 1944. Cejko was a Belarusian who served in the 37th Rifle Division, was captured by the Germans, and escaped from a POW camp in Kalvarija.

The commemorative monument erected in Koniuchy lists 38 names, among them 11 women and 15 children under the age of 16. The youngest murdered child was 1.5-year old girl shot while held in her mother's arms. Another dozen of villagers was injured. According to reports of the Lithuanian Security Police, 36 houses, 40 granaries, 39 barns, and one banya were burned down, 50 cows, 16 horses, about 50 pigs, and 100 sheep were slaughtered. By one account, only six houses remained standing in the village. The same security police report also claimed that two murdered villagers were Lithuanian policemen and that one partisan was killed and three were injured – this is contradicted by Zimanas' reports that claimed no casualties on the Soviet side. The surviving villagers received a government benefit of 500 Reichsmarks.

After the war, Soviet partisans barely mentioned Koniuchy in their memoirs. Even partisan personnel files maintained by Soviet security agencies often neglected to mention the person's involvement in the massacre. Jewish partisans wrote a few contradictory accounts of the Koniuchy events. In a 1969 book Kauno getas ir jo kovotojai (Kovno Ghetto and Its Fighters) Dmitri Gelpernas and Mejeris Elinas (Meir Yelin) portrayed the massacre as a fierce battle "for every house" with well armed "Hitlerites". Fierce fighting was also described by Isaac Kowalski (1969) and Rozka Korczak in her Russian memoir published in 1977. Chaim Lazar in his book Destruction and Resistance (published in 1985 in New York) wrote that the village was to be destroyed completely and described how half-naked people jumped out the windows to escape the bullets. In 1988, Paul Bagriansky published a graphic account of the events that included mutilation of eight villagers' corpses. More accounts were recorded after the dissolution of the Soviet Union, including by Abraham Zeleznikow (1993). Survivor accounts were first published by the Lithuanian daily Respublika in 1990.

=== Immediate aftermath ===
According to a report by the Lithuanian Auxiliary Police, 52 auxiliaries from the 253rd Battalion armed with machine guns went to Koniuchy at 7 a.m., but failed to intercept the partisans. Soviet partisans also threatened to attack the nearby villages of Butrimonys, Janonys, Pasalis, and Šauliai. On the other side of the Rūdninkai forest, the partisans attacked Kiemeliškės and took provisions and the Lithuanian police attempted to ambush the partisans in the Klepočiai village. Other ambushes were also unsuccessful.

The Lithuanian Auxiliary Police considered reprisal actions against villages supporting the Soviet partisans. Locals identified a couple of residents from Didžiosios Sėlos and Visinčia as participants in the attack on Koniuchy. According to reports of the Lithuanian Security Police, about 40 policemen from the 253rd Battalion surrounded Didžiosios Sėlos, searched for weapons, and severely injured two residents. A letter from an officer of the 253rd Battalion to his superior openly suggested to deal with Didžiosios Sėlos in the same manner as two Belarusian villages near Vidzy that were destroyed by the battalion during an anti-partisan operation in October 1943, but it was avoided. Soviet partisans were afraid of a reprisal action by the Germans and some units left their bases. Zimanas even suggested that the partisans might retreat to forests near the Lake Narach where units commanded by Motiejus Šumauskas were based. The situation normalized by early March 1944.

== Investigations ==
The Polish Institute of National Remembrance (IPN) initiated a formal investigation into the incident on 3 March 2001, at the request of the Canadian Polish Congress. The institute examined a number of archival documents including police reports, encoded messages, military records and personnel files of the Soviet partisans. Requests for legal assistance were then sent to state prosecutors in Belarus, Lithuania, the Russian Federation and Israel. The IPN investigation was discontinued on 21 May 2020. While the investigation established that the massacre was carried out by a combined group of Soviet partisan units operating in the Rudniki Forest, the identified commanders had died and the remaining perpetrators could not be individually identified with sufficient certainty to bring charges.

The Lithuanian prosecutor general subsequently opened its own investigation into the massacre in 2004. In April 2006, the Lithuanian daily Respublika published excerpts from memoirs of Yitzhak Arad, former chairman of Yad Vashem, about his role in the Koniuchy massacre. A pretrial investigation against Arad was opened in May 2006. As part of its investigation, Lithuanian prosecutors sought to question other Jewish veterans of the partisan movement, including Sara Ginaitė, Rachel Margolis, and Fania Branstovsky. Arad had served as a member of the International Commission for the Evaluation of the Crimes of the Nazi and Soviet Occupation Regimes in Lithuania appointed by the president of Lithuania in 2005. In response to the investigation, Yad Vashem issued a protest saying it focused on "victims of Nazi oppression" and suspended Israeli participation in the international commission. The failure of the Lithuanian judiciary to investigate local Nazi collaborators like Aleksandras Lileikis while choosing to question Jewish partisans led to charges of hypocrisy, attempt at victim blaming, and antisemitism. Following wide international and some domestic criticism, the Lithuanian investigation was closed in September 2008.

== Evaluations ==
Saulius Sužiedėlis summarized the evaluations of the massacre saying that Jewish groups considered the investigations an attack against the "heroic Soviet antifascist resistance" while Lithuania and Poland saw it as a Soviet atrocity complicating the oversimplified good vs. evil image of the fight against Nazi Germany. Similar views were expressed by Piotr Gontarczyk who said that the events of Koniuchy distort the black and white, heroic image of Jewish partisans, and lamented that attempts to reconstruct complicated historic events or interview figures like Arad are seen as antisemitism.

According to Antony Polonsky, nationalists in both Lithuania and Poland have portrayed Koniuchy as a "Jewish action". While the exact determination of the ethnicity of the Soviet partisans is not possible, it is clear that Jews were a minority in these formations. While discussing anti-Semitic stereotypes and historical exaggerations of Jews' role in Soviet atrocities, Polonsky stated that time has come for Jews to accept that some of their compatriots also carried out atrocities, and partisans involved in Koniuchy and Naliboki massacres committed "very evil things".

Hanna Maria Kwiatkowska concluded that daily Nasz Dziennik used the stories of Koniuchy and Naliboki massacres as a balancing counterweight to the Jedwabne pogrom which came to public attention in 1999. Rimantas Zizas echoed the same sentiment that Koniuchy became politicized in Poland due to Jedwabne. Similarly, Dovid Katz said that a politicized prosecution in Lithuania used Koniuchy to obfuscate the Holocaust by shifting attention to Soviet partisans from unpunished local war criminals who aided the Holocaust in Lithuania resulting in some 200,000 Jewish deaths. He decried the Lithuanian investigation as "antisemitic campaigns masquerading as history".

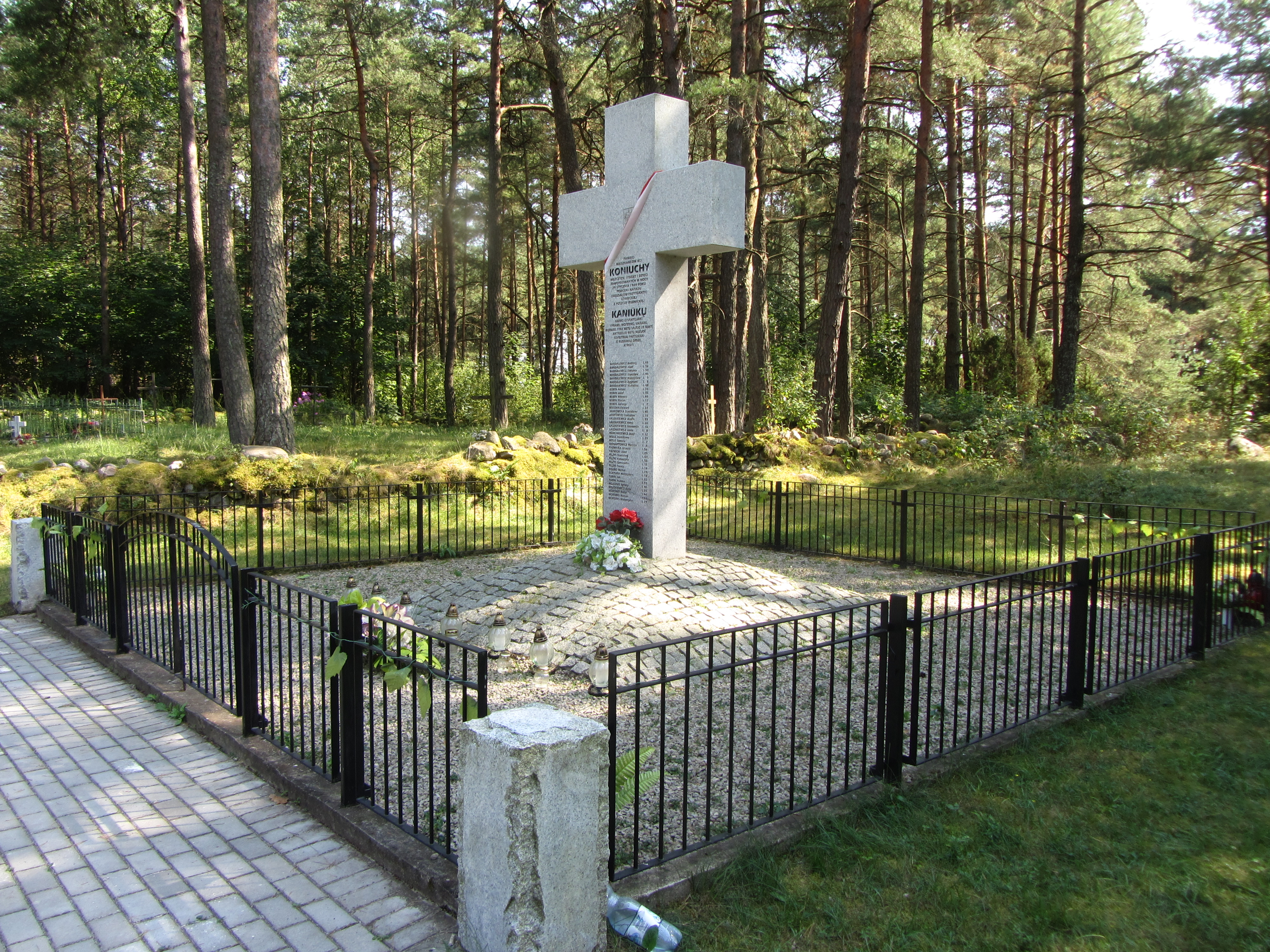
Memorial cross erected in 2004

== Commemoration ==
In May 2004, a memorial cross commemorating the event was erected in Kaniūkai with the names of the known victims.

== See also ==
- List of massacres in Lithuania
- Naliboki massacre
