= Ponary massacre =

1941–1944 Nazi murders in Vilnius, Lithuania

- One of six Ponary murder pits in which victims were shot (July 1941). Note the ramp leading down and the group of men forced to wear hoods.
- Also known as: Polish: zbrodnia w Ponarach
- Location: Paneriai (Ponary), Vilnius (Wilno), Reichskommissariat Ostland; 54.6264°N 25.1612°E
- Date: July 1941 – August 1944
- Incident type: Shootings by automatic and semi-automatic weapons, genocide
- Perpetrators: SS Einsatzgruppe; Lithuanian collaborators
- Ghetto: Vilnius Ghetto
- Victims: ~100,000 in total (Jews: 70,000; Poles: From 1,000 to 2,000; Soviets/Russians: 8,000)
- Documentation: Nuremberg Trials

The Ponary massacre (Polish: zbrodnia w Ponarach), or the Paneriai massacre (Lithuanian: Panerių žudynės), was the mass murder of up to 100,000 people, mostly Jews, Poles, and Russians, by German SD and SS and the Lithuanian Ypatingasis būrys killing squads, during World War II and the Holocaust in the Generalbezirk Litauen of Reichskommissariat Ostland. The murders took place between July 1941 and August 1944 near the railway station at Ponary (now Paneriai), a suburb of today's Vilnius, Lithuania. 70,000 Jews were murdered at Ponary, (Note: Unlike the Jews of sovereign Lithuania before 1939 (or the Generalbezirk Litauen after Operation Barbarossa), who had their own complex identity and could be described retroactively as either Polish, Lithuanian or Russian, the Jews of the Wilno region were citizens of the Second Polish Republic before the German-Soviet invasion of September 1939; and thousands of refugees from German-occupied Poland kept arriving. In October 1939 the city was ceded over to Lithuania. On the eve of its Soviet annexation in June 1940, Vilna was home to around 100,000 newcomers, including 85,000 Poles, 10,000 Jews, and 5,000 Belorussians and Russians. Ethnic Lithuanians represented less than 0.7 percent of the inhabitants of the city.^{[p. 4]}) along with up to 2,000 Poles, 8,000 Soviet POWs, most of them from nearby Vilnius, and its newly formed Vilna Ghetto.

Lithuania became one of the first locations outside occupied Poland in World War II where the Nazis mass-murdered Jews as part of the Final Solution. (Note: According to Miller-Korpi (1998), one of the areas to first experience the totality of Hitler's "Final Solution" for the Jews were the Baltic countries. Her opinion nevertheless was challenged by Dr. Samuel Drix (Witness to Annihilation), and Jochaim Schoenfeld (Holocaust Memoirs) who argued that the Final Solution began in Distrikt Galizien.) According to Timothy Snyder, out of 70,000 Jews living in Vilna, only about 7,000 survived the war. The number of dwellers, estimated by Steven P. Sedlis, as of June 1941 was 80,000 Jews, or one-half of the city's population. More than two-thirds of them, or at least 50,000 Jews, had been killed before the end of 1941.

== Background ==
Following Żeligowski's Mutiny and the creation of the short-lived Central Lithuania, in accordance with international agreements ratified in 1923 by the League of Nations, the town of Ponary became part of the Wilno Voivodship (Kresy region) of the Second Polish Republic. The predominant languages in the area were Polish and Yiddish. After the Soviet invasion of Poland in September 1939, the region was occupied by the Soviets and after about a month, on October 10, transferred to Lithuania under the Soviet–Lithuanian Mutual Assistance Treaty.

Following the Soviet annexation of Lithuania and the Baltic states in June 1940, construction of an oil storage facility began near Ponary for a future Soviet military airfield. That project was never completed, and in June 1941 the area was taken by the Wehrmacht in Operation Barbarossa. The Nazi killing squads used the six large pits excavated for the oil storage tanks to hide the bodies of the locals killed there.

== Massacres ==
Ponary massacre site on the map of the Holocaust in Poland (top right corner, near Wilno), marked with a white skull

The massacres began as soon as SS Einsatzkommando 9 arrived in Vilna on 2 July 1941. Most of the actual killings were carried out by the Ypatingasis burys (Lithuanian volunteers) 80 men strong. On 9 August 1941, EK 9 was replaced by EK 3. In September, the Vilna Ghetto was established. In the same month 3,700 Jews were shot in one operation, and 6,000 in another; rounded up in the city and walked to Paneriai. Most victims were stripped before being shot. Further mass killings by Ypatingasis burys took place throughout the summer and autumn.

By the end of the year, about 50,000–60,000 Vilna Jews—men, women, and children—had been killed. According to Snyder 21,700 of them were shot at Ponary, but there are serious discrepancies in the death toll for this period. Yitzhak Arad supplied information in his book Ghetto in Flames based on original Jewish documentation augmented by the Einsatzgruppen reports, ration cards and work permits.

According to his estimates, until the end of December, 33,500 Jews of Vilna were murdered in Ponary, 3,500 fled east, and 20,000 remained in the ghetto. The reason for such a wide range of estimated deaths was the presence of war refugees arriving from German-occupied western Poland, whose residence rights were denied by the new Lithuanian administration. On the eve of the Soviet annexation of Lithuania in June 1940, Vilna was home to around 100,000 newcomers, including 85,000 Poles, and 10,000 Jews according to Lithuanian Red Cross.

The pace of killings slowed in 1942, as ghettoised Jewish slave-workers were appropriated by the Wehrmacht. As Soviet troops advanced in 1943, the Nazi units tried to cover up the crime under the Aktion 1005 directive. Eighty inmates from the Stutthof concentration camp were formed into Leichenkommando ("corpse units"). The workers were forced to dig up bodies, pile them on wood and burn them. The ashes were then ground up, mixed with sand and buried. After months of this work, the brigade managed to escape on 19 April 1944 through a tunnel dug with spoons. Eleven of the eighty who escaped survived the war; their testimony contributed to revealing the massacre.

== Victims ==
The total number of victims by the end of 1944 was between 70,000 and 100,000. According to post-war exhumation by the forces of Soviet 2nd Belorussian Front the majority (50,000–70,000) of the victims were Polish Jews and Lithuanian Jews from nearby Polish and Lithuanian cities, while the rest were primarily Poles (about 20,000) and Russians (about 8,000). According to Monika Tomkiewicz, author of a 2008 book on the Ponary massacre, 80,000 people were killed, including 72,000 Jews, 5,000 Soviet prisoners, between 1,500 and 2,000 Poles, 1,000 people described as Communists or Soviet activists, and 40 Romani people.

The Polish victims were mostly members of the Polish intelligentsia—academics, educators such as Kazimierz Pelczar, a professor at Stefan Batory University, priests such as Father Romuald Świrkowski, and members of the Armia Krajowa resistance movement. Among the first victims were approximately 7,500 Soviet P.O.W.s shot in 1941 soon after Operation Barbarossa began. At later stages there were also smaller numbers of victims of other nationalities, including local Russians, Romani and Lithuanians, particularly Communist sympathizers (Liudas Adomauskas, Valerijonas Knyva, Andrius Bulota, and Aleksandra Bulotienė) and over 90 soldiers of General Povilas Plechavičius' Local Lithuanian Detachment who refused to follow German orders.

== Commemoration ==
Information about the massacre began to spread as early as 1943, due to the activities and works of Helena Pasierbska, Józef Mackiewicz, Kazimierz Sakowicz and others. Nonetheless the Soviet regime, which supported the resettlement of Poles from the Kresy, found it convenient to deny that Poles or Jews were singled out for massacre in Paneriai; the official line was that Paneriai was a site of massacre of Soviet citizens only.

On 22 October 2000, a decade after the fall of communism, an effort by several Polish organizations raised a cross to fallen Polish citizens, in an official ceremony attended by Bronisław Komorowski, Polish Minister of Defence, and his Lithuanian counterpart, as well as several NGOs.

On the site of the massacre is a monument to the victims of the Holocaust erected in 1991, a memorial to Polish victims erected in 1990, reconstructed in 2000, a monument to soldiers of Lithuanian Local Squad killed by Nazis in May 1944, erected in 2004, and a memorial stone to Soviet war prisoners, starved to death and shot here in 1941, erected in 1996, as well as a small museum. The first monument on the site was built by Vilnius Jews in 1948 but was replaced by the Soviet regime with a conventional obelisk dedicated to "Victims of Fascism".

The murders at Paneriai are currently being investigated by the Gdańsk branch of the Polish Institute of National Remembrance and by the Genocide and Resistance Research Center of Lithuania. The basic facts about memorial signs in the Paneriai memorial and the objects of the former mass murder site (killing pits, tranches, gates, paths, etc.) are now presented in the webpage created by the Vilna Gaon Museum of Jewish History.

The massacre was recorded by Polish journalist Kazimierz Sakowicz (1899–1944) in a series of journal entries written in hiding at his farm house in Wilno, Lithuania. After Sakowicz's death in 1944, the collection of entries were located and found on various scrap pieces of paper, soda bottles and a calendar from 1941 by holocaust-survivor and author Rahel Margolis. Margolis, who had lost family members in the Ponary massacre, later published the collection in 1999 in Polish. The diary became important to tracing the timeline of the massacre, and in many instances gave closure to surviving family members on what happened to their loved ones. Written in detail, the diary is a testimonial written from a first-person witness account of the atrocities.

=== Memorial at the site ===
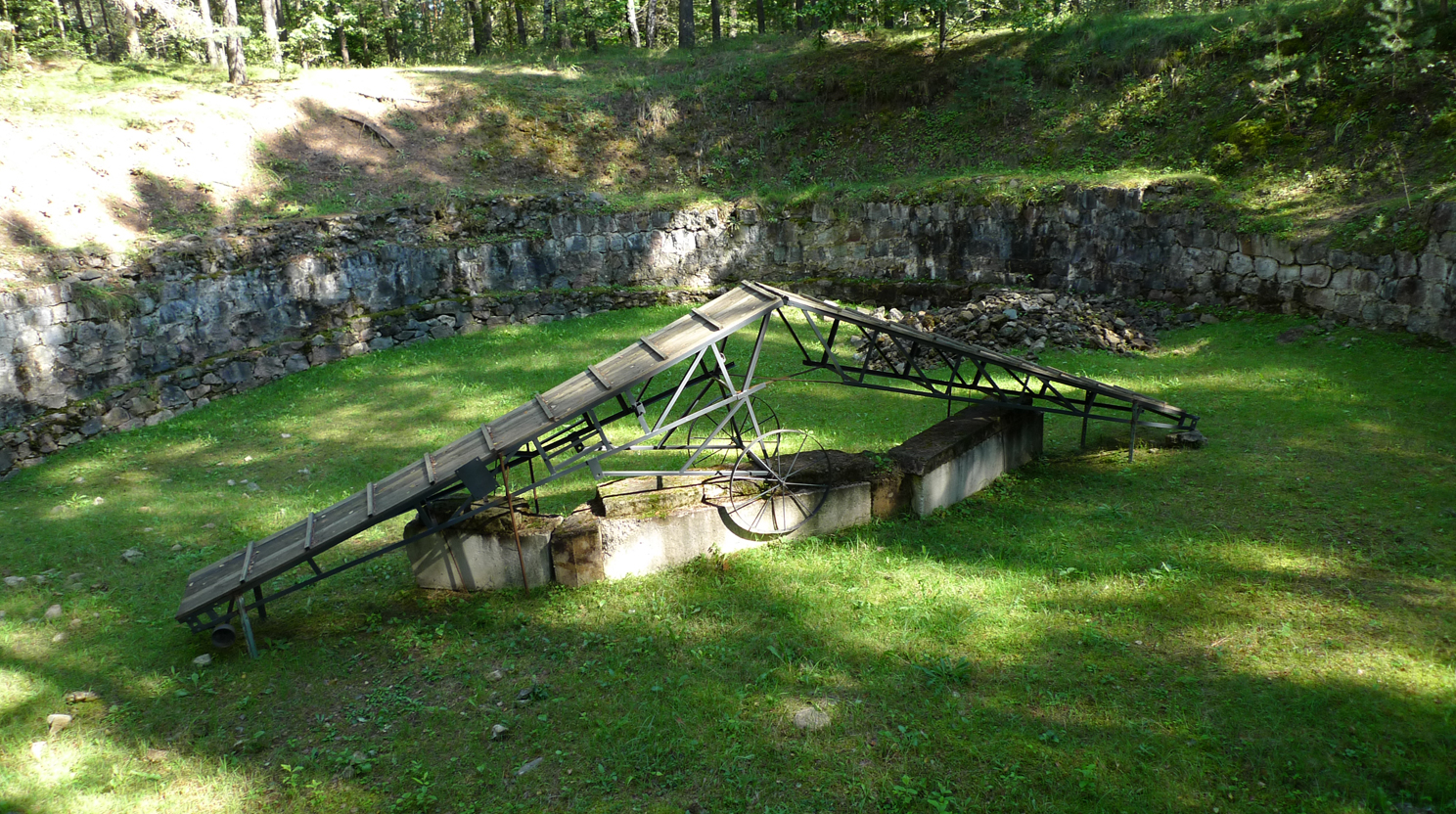
Pit used to burn corpses that were exhumed to destroy evidence of mass murders.

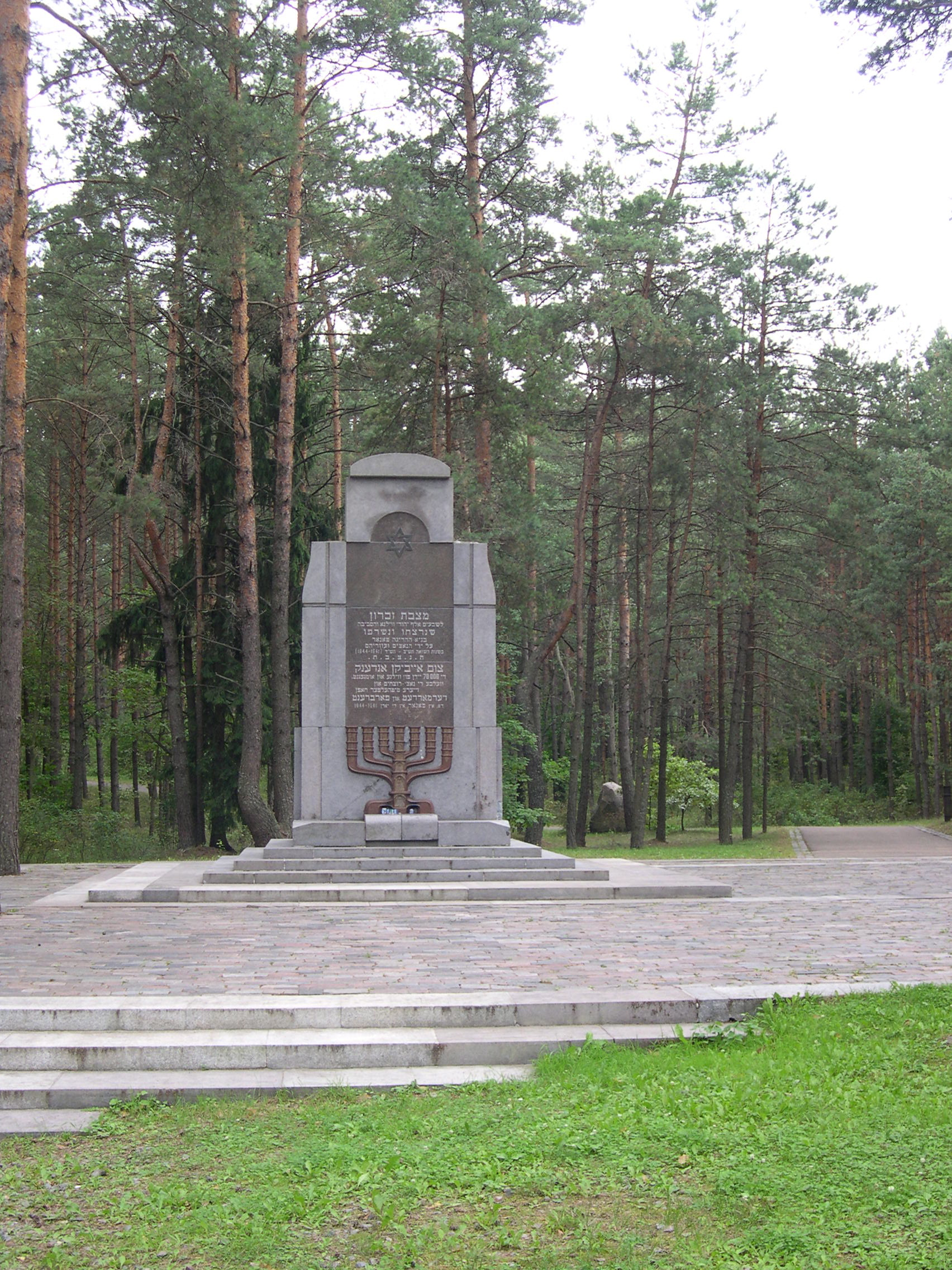
Memorial for Jewish victims.

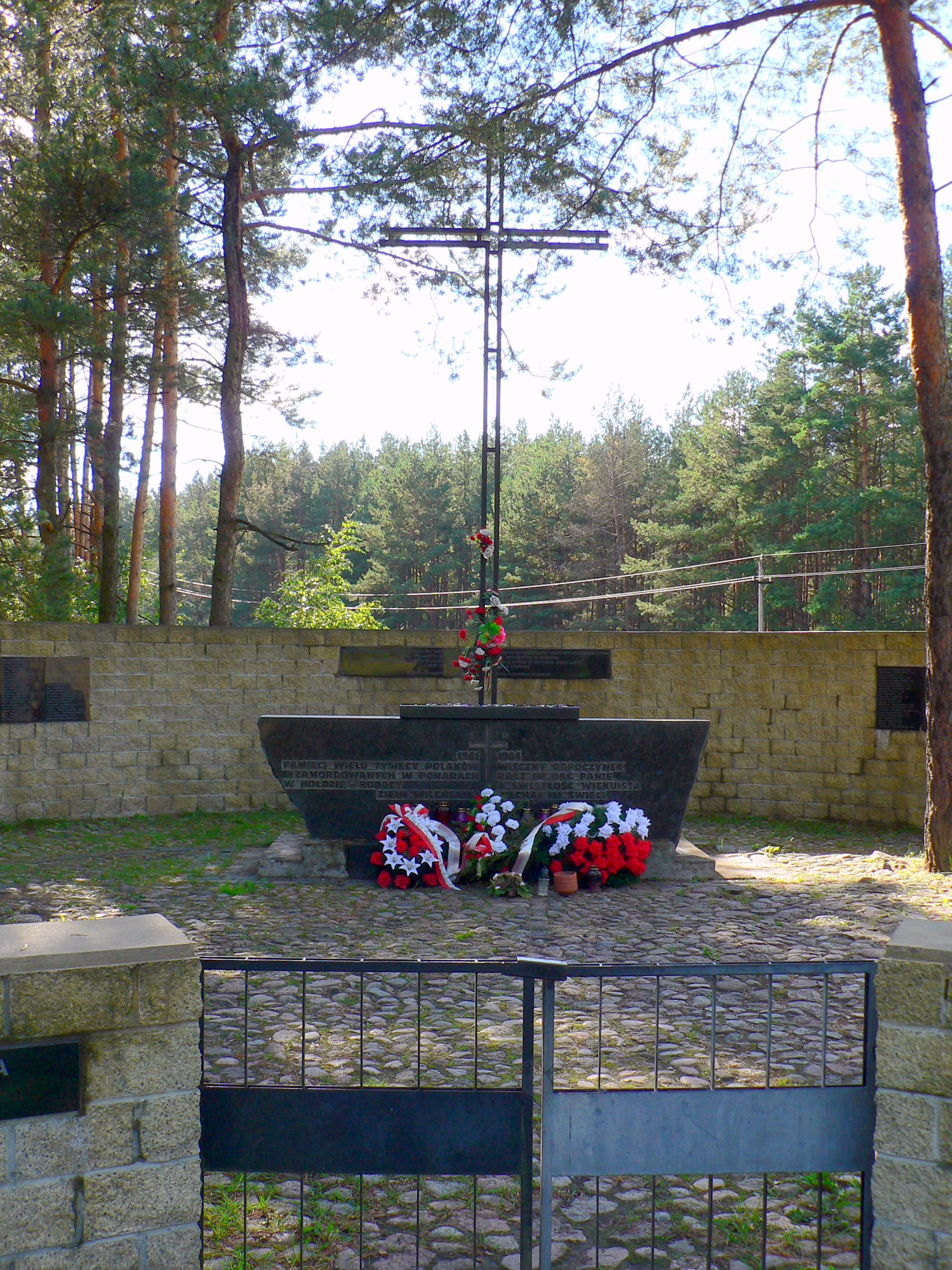
Memorial for Polish victims.

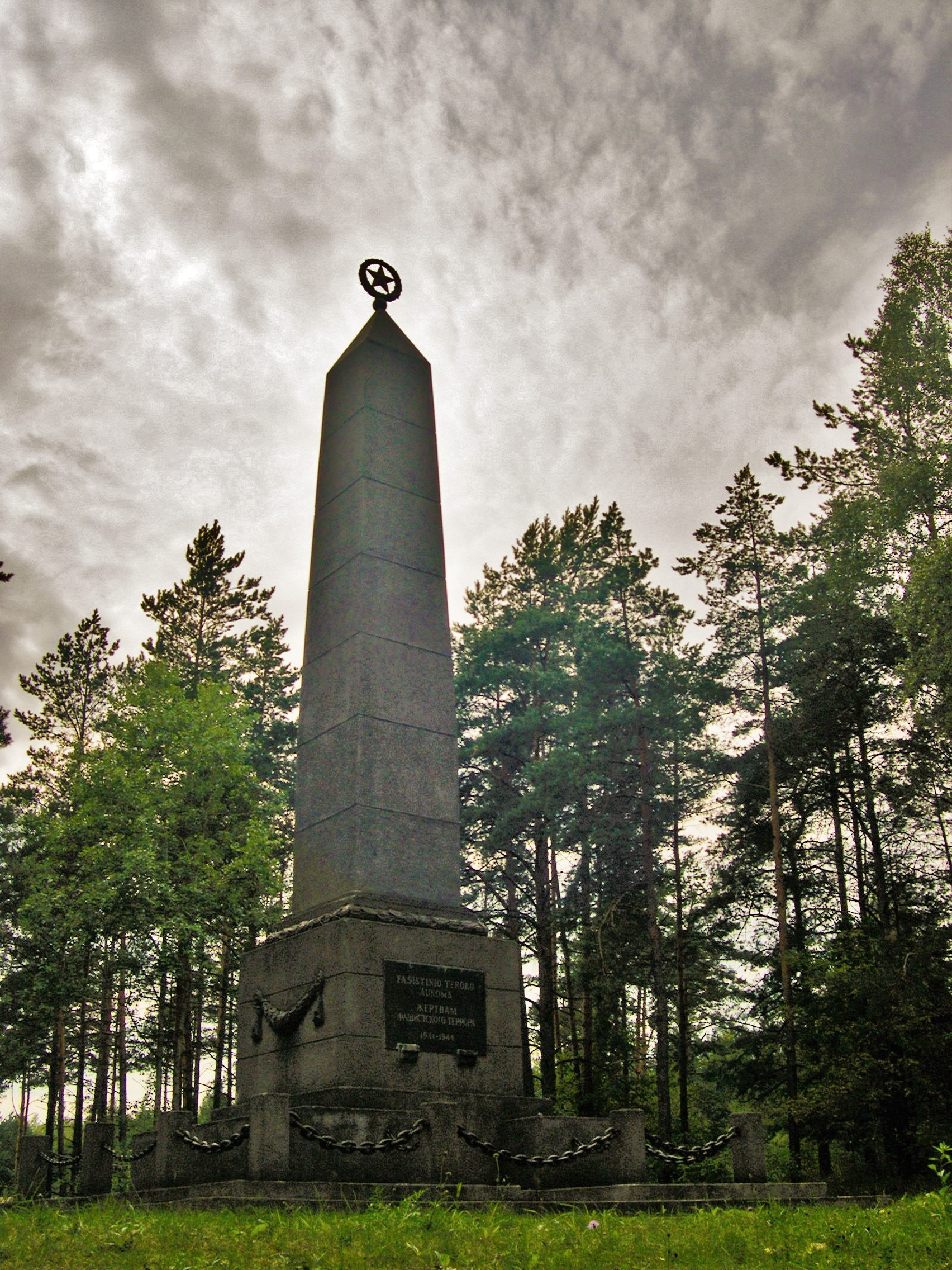
Memorial for Soviet victims.

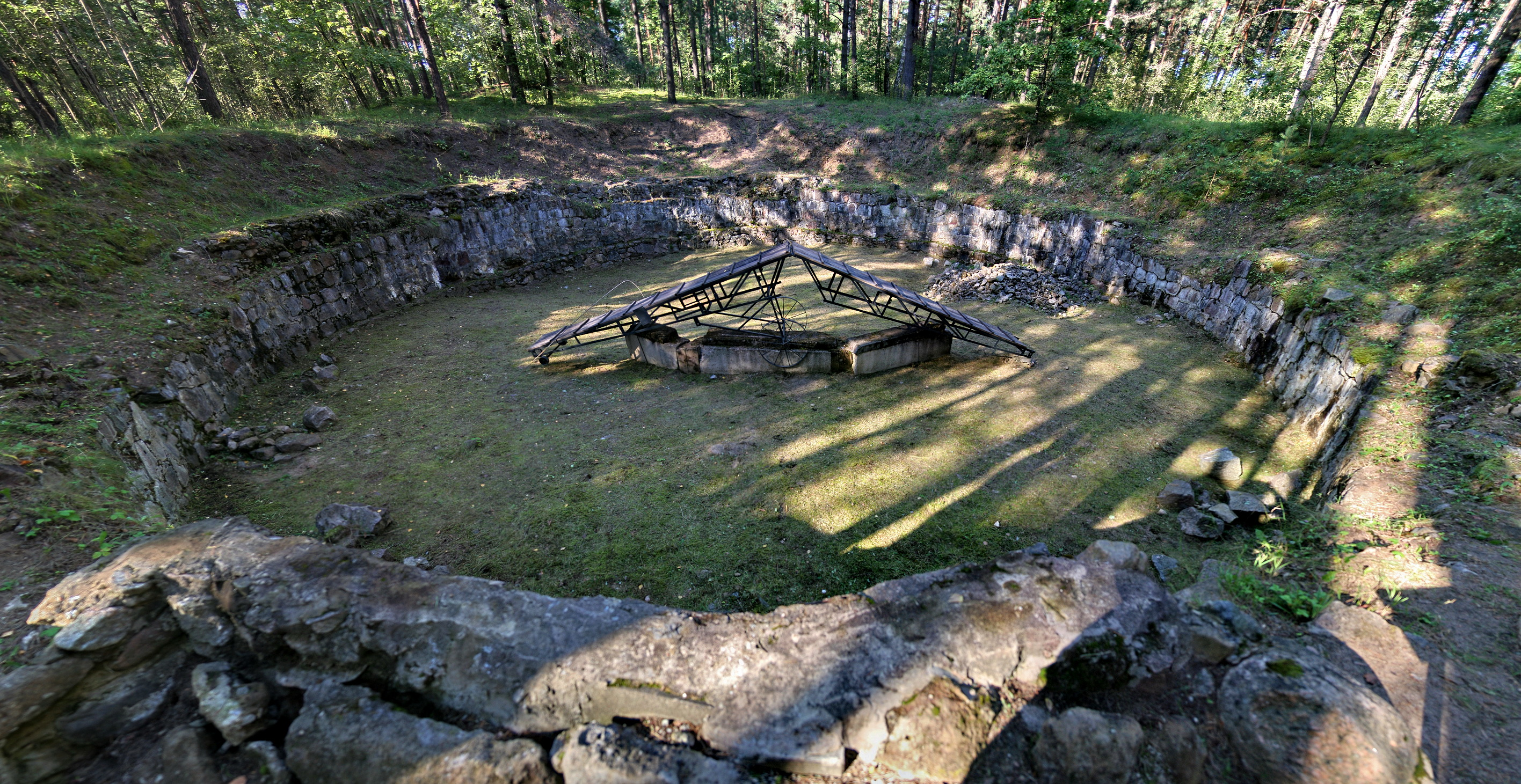
An excavated pit used to cremate corpses

== See also ==
- List of massacres in Lithuania
- Lithuanian collaboration with Nazi Germany
- History of Vilnius
