= Kaniūkai =

- Village
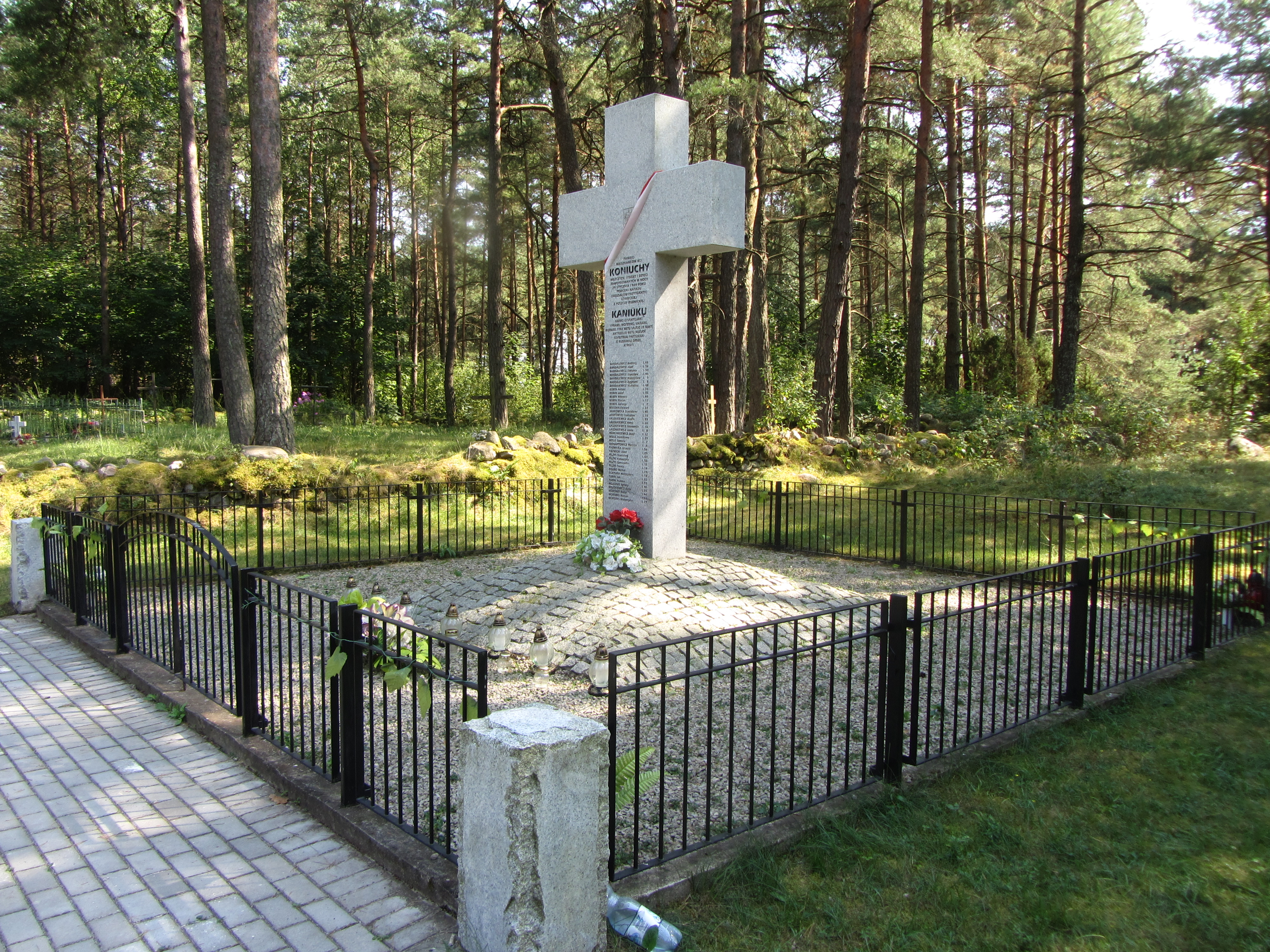
- Memorial cross at the site of the Koniuchy massacre

- Location of Kaniūkai
- Coordinates: 54°16′50″N 25°14′40″E
- Country: Lithuania
- County: Vilnius County
- Municipality: Šalčininkai district municipality
- Eldership: Gerviškės eldership

Population (2011)
  - Total: 125
- Time zone: UTC+2 (EET)
  - Summer (DST): UTC+3 (EEST)

Kaniūkai (Polish: Koniuchy; Belarusian: Канюхі) is a village in the Šalčininkai district municipality of Lithuania. According to the 2011 census, its population was 125.

== History ==
Before 1939 Koniuchy (present-day Kaniūkai) was located in the Lida county of the Nowogródek Voivodeship, Second Polish Republic. It was occupied by the Soviet Union in September 1939 and was transferred to Lithuania according to the Soviet–Lithuanian Mutual Assistance Treaty. The village became part of the Jašiūnai Municipality, Eišiškės County before the Occupation of the Baltic states by the Soviet Union on 3 August 1940. Later it was briefly part of the German Reichskommissariat Ostland before returning to the Lithuanian Soviet Socialist Republic (since 1990, Lithuania).

During World War II, it was the site of the Koniuchy massacre by Soviet partisans which included a detachment of Jewish partisans.
