= Songs of the Vilna Ghetto =

Compilation album by Various artists
- Released: 1969
- Genre: Jewish music
- Language: Yiddish
- Label: CBS Records

Songs of the Vilna Ghetto is a compilation LP record featuring twelve Yiddish songs from World War II era. The songs were composed by the inmates of the Vilna Ghetto during the Holocaust and are sung by Nechama Hendel, Chava Alberstein, and Shimon Israeli with accompaniment from the CBS Israel Orchestra and Choir, conducted by Gil Aldema. The album contains an 8-page booklet with lyrics in the Yiddish language, photographs from the ghetto, and historical information about the songs in English. According to the liner notes, the recording "was prepared by the Yitzhak Kalznelson House of the Ghetto Fighters, at Kibbutz Lochamei Hagetaot, Israel, in co-operation with the Vilna Organisation [sic] of Haifa."

== Track listing ==
#	Song	English translation	Length	Performer	Lyrics by	Notes
1	"Vilna"	Vilnius	3:33	Chava Alberstein	Efraim-Leyb Wolfson (1870–1946)	From the early 1930s. Composer Alexander Olshanetsky.
2	"Partizaner Lied"	Partisan Song	3:30	Shimon Israeli with CBS Israel Orchestra	Hirsh Glick	Set to Russian folk melody. About the first attack of the Fareynikte Partizaner Organizatsye
3	"Vig-Lied"	Lullaby	3:34	Helena (Nama) Hendel	Lea Rudnitski	
4	"Farvos iz Der Himmel"	Why Are The Heavens	2:44	Choir	L. Ofeski	
5	"Ich Beink Aheim"	I Long for Home	3:53	Helena Hendel	Leyb Rozental (1916–1945)	
6	"Yugent Hymn"	Youth Hymn	2:35	Choir	Shmerke Kaczerginski	Dedicated to the youth club of the ghetto. Features upbeat rhythm and encouraging lyrics.
7	"Unter Deine Veisse Shtern"	Under Your White Stars	3:00	Helena Hendel and Choir	Abraham Sutzkever	
8	"Itzik Wittenberg"		3:20	Shimon Israeli	Shmerke Kaczerginski	Set to a Russian melody. About arrest and murder of Yitzhak Wittenberg in July 1943.
9	"Shtiller, Shtiller (Ponar - Lullaby)"	Quiet, Quiet	3:16	Chava Alberstein	Shmerke Kaczerginski	Composer Alexander Wolkovsky. A lullaby by a mother to her son about the Ponary massacre.
10	"Tsu Eins, Zwei, Drei!"	One, Two, Three!	3:02	Choir	Leyb Rozental	
11	"Freeling"	Spring	4:05	Chava Alberstein with CBS Israel Orchestra	Shmerke Kaczerginski	Set to a tango melody. Written following the death of Kaczerginski's wife, Barbara Kaufman (Kaczerginski), in April 1943.
12	"Zog Nit Kein Mol"	Never Say	2:55	Shimon Israeli and Choir with CBS Israel Orchestra	Hirsh Glick	Composer Dmitry Pokrass
