= Vitka Kempner =

Polish Jewish partisan leader during World War II

- ויטקה קובנר
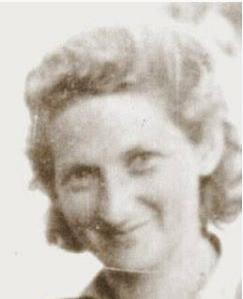
- Kempner in July 1944 after the liberation of Vilna
- Born: March 14, 1920; Kalisz, Poland
- Died: February 14, 2012 (aged 91); Israel
- Known for: Jewish partisan in World War II
- Spouse: Abba Kovner (m. 1946)
- Children: 2

Vitka Kempner (Hebrew: ויטקה קובנר; 14 March 1920 – 14 February 2012) was a Polish Jewish partisan leader during World War II. She served in the Fareynikte Partizaner Organizatsye (FPO) and, alongside Rozka Korczak and founder Abba Kovner, assumed a leadership role in its successor group, the Nakam.

== Early life ==
Kempner was born on 14 March 1920 in Kalisz, Poland, to a liberal Jewish-Polish family proud of both their Jewish and Polish ancestry. Her parents, Hayah and Zevi, ran a retail business in Kalisz. She had a younger brother, Baruch, born 1923, and spoke Polish at home. Vitka completed her schooling at a progressive Jewish school before receiving tertiary education in Warsaw. During her youth, Vitka was active in Jewish groups. She became the first woman to join Betar, a revisionist Zionist paramilitary organisation, but later transferred to Hashomer Hatzair, a secular Labour Zionist youth movement, and the affiliated Avukah student organisation.

== World War II ==
=== Flight to Vilna ===
Whist Kempner was 19-years old and in Kalisz, Nazi Germany began its invasion of Poland on 1 September 1939. The city fell quickly on September 3 due to its proximity to the German border. Witnessing the abuse inflicted by Germans onto Jews, she became determined that she would "not be humiliated". Together with Baruch, she left her parents and fled to Vilna (Vilnius). Vilna had been under Polish control up until October 10 when it was absorbed into Lithuania. By being in neutral Lithuania, Vilna served as a gathering place for the members of Zionist youth movements who were planning out routes to immigrate to Mandatory Palestine. In June 1940, Lithuania came under Soviet occupation.

=== Resistance ===
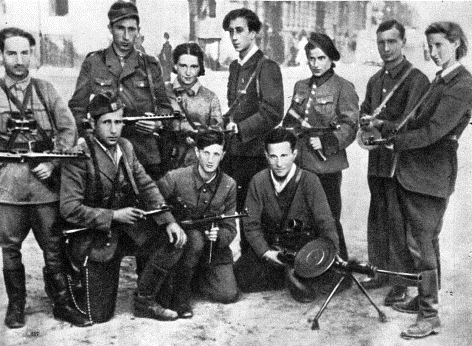
Vitka Kempner (standing at far right) in the Vilna Ghetto with members of the FPO including Abba Kovner and Rozka Korczak.

On 22 June 1941, Axis soldiers began their invasion of the Soviet Union as part of Operation Barbarossa. German soldiers entered Vilna on June 24, with all of Lithuania falling to German occupation within a week. Under German control, numerous Jews in Lithuania were rounded up and killed with the assistance of Lithuanian collaborators. On September 6, a ghetto was formally established in the old town of Vilna. News of the Ponary Massacre of Vilna's Jews reached the ghetto shortly after and Kempner became determined to resist the Germans. Because of her ability to move in and out of the ghetto, Kempner became an active part of the ghetto's underground Jewish movement. Using the city's sewage canals, she helped move people and ammunition. Alongside fellow partisan Rozka Korczak, Kempner had to hide herself as she lacked the proper documents to remain in the ghetto. Inspired by the 1942 manifesto "Let us not go like lambs to the slaughter!" by Jewish partisan Abba Kovner, who was also active in the Vilna ghetto, she entered the ghetto with occasional participation in partisan activity.

On 21 January 1942, the Fareynikte Partizaner Organizatsye (United Partisan Organization, FPO) was established and was the only organisation that included all of the ghetto's Zionist youth movements. Together with Itzke Matzkevich, Kempner carried out the FPO's first act of sabotage. Having investigated the timetable of German military trains arriving in Vilna, she and Matzkevich blew up a German train in the forest. The FPO suffered setbacks in July 1943 when its leader, Yitzhak Wittenberg, was captured. Kovner then assumed leadership.

The Vilna ghetto was finally liquidated by the Germans on 23 and 24 September 1943. Kempner helped lead resistance members, including Kovner, out of the ghetto to the Rūdninkai Forest. By the end of the ghetto's liquidation, the camp had around 600 partisans and became known as the Avengers (Nokmim). Now based in the forest, Kempner became the commander of patrol groups responsible for collecting information, maintaining contact with underground groups in the city, and transporting medicine. She continued to participate on combat and sabotage missions. For the next nine months, Kempner also helped destroy Vilna's power and water systems. With Korczak, Kempner became one of Kovner's lieutenants. This was also around the same time the personal relationship between Kempner and Kovner began.

In July 1944, Kempner led a patrol mission to reach Soviet-liberated Vilna, where she met Jewish Soviet soldiers.

== Nakam ==
Following the liberation of Vilna by the Soviet Red Army by 13 July 1944, Kempner, Kovner and Korczak decided to find the surviving members of Hashomer Hatzair and promote immigration (Aliyah) to Palestine. With surviving members of Jewish youth movements, partisan groups and those returning from the USSR, the Berihah movement was founded in Lublin, Poland, in January 1945 with Kovner as its leader. It too sought to promote an exodus of Jews from Europe to Palestine. Kempner shared Kovner's belief that the Holocaust left no reason for a renewal of Jewish life in Europe and helped smuggle Jews to Palestine, which was forbidden by British authorities.

Kempner also shared Kovner's desire for revenge, stating that revenge could be conceived as an essential act meant to achieve justice. Whilst Kovner left for Palestine to obtain the poison needed for their plans, Kempner remained in Europe with other members as part of their cell in Paris led by Pasha Reichman. Kovner ended up being arrested and imprisoned by British authorities in December 1945 and the groups plans of poisoning the water supply of important German cities never came to fruition. They then sought to implement plan B, the mass poisoning of SS prisoners. On April 13, 1946, Kempner and others infiltrated a bakery that supplied bread for Nazi POWs in Nuremberg. They coated 2,300 loaves of bread with arsenic before a guard was alerted and they were forced to flee. Many of the POWs fell ill, but none were reported dead. The group eventually decided to immigrate to Palestine, arriving there in July 1946 where they were convinced by Kovner and Korczak to go the Kibbutz Ein HaHoresh in the Sharon plain. Kempner concluded then that it was time to start a new life and leave the war behind themselves.

== Life in Israel ==
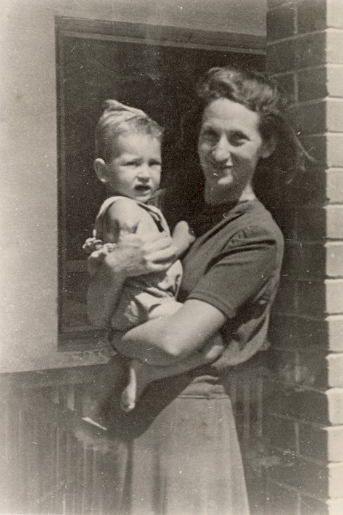
Kempner holding her son Michael (born 1948) around 1950.

In 1946, Kempner and Kovner were married and settled down at the Kibbutz Ein HaHoresh. The pair had two children together. Their first child, Michael, was born on 27 May 1948 whilst Kovner was serving on the southern front of the 1948 Arab-Israeli War. In 1956, Kempner gave birth to a daughter named Shlomit. Around 1951, Kempner contracted tuberculosis, which affected her relationship with her children and helped spur her to begin university studies where she learnt history, English and French. She eventually turned to special education. At 45-years old, Kempner studied clinical psychology at Bar Ilan University in Ramat Gan. Inspired by her lecturer George Stern, Kempner developed her own form of colour psychotherapy called 'non-verbal therapy by colour', which was implemented at the Unit for Parent-Child Treatment at the Oranim Teachers’ College of the Kibbutz Movement at Haifa. At the same time, she continued to help educate children at her Kibbutz and later helped instruct other psychologists.

Kempner initially avoided writing down her recollections of World War II until much later, when other Jewish partisans and fighters had published their own. In the 1990s she became involved with Yad Vashem and handed over Kovner's personal pistol to them in 2004 following his death from cancer in 1987. Kempner died in Israel on 15 February 2012.

== Legacy ==
Much of Kempner's legacy is being the wife of Abba Kovner, where she admits she lived in his shadow but that "it was good to be there". She often downplayed her significance and emphasised the significance of Kovner.

Kempner is remembered in the song Shtil, di nakht iz oysgeshternt by Hirsh Glick, which celebrates her heroic attack on a German convoy in the Vilnius sector in 1942.
