= Josef Glazman =

20th-century Jewish resistance leader in the Holocaust

- Born: 1913
- Died: 7 October 1943 (aged 29–30)
- Known for: Resistance leader in the Vilna Ghetto

Josef Glazman (Note: Sometimes Joseph Glazman, or Yosef Glazman.) (1913 – 7 October 1943) was a Lithuanian-Jewish resistance leader in the Vilna Ghetto. A member of the Revisionist Zionism movement prior to the German invasion of the Baltic states in 1941, afterward, he took part in the resistance and youth movements in the ghetto. He also worked in the Jewish-run ghetto administration – first in the police, then later in the housing department. Glazman's relationship with the head of the ghetto, Jacob Gens, was difficult and led to Glazman's arrest several times. Eventually, Glazman left the ghetto with a group of followers and formed a partisan unit in the Lithuanian forests. His partisan band was surrounded in October 1943, and Glazman and all but one of the members were killed by the Germans.

== Early life ==
Josef Glazman was born in 1913 in the town of Alytus in southern Lithuania, then part of Russia. He became head of the Betar youth movement in Lithuania in 1937, and at some point served in the Lithuanian Army. He was also a member of the Zionist-Revisionist political movement and was the editor of the Revisionist newspaper Hamdina. When the Soviet Union invaded and occupied Lithuania in July 1940, Glazman joined the resistance to the Soviet authorities. He lost his position with Betar when it was disbanded by the Soviets, along with all other Jewish political groups, shortly after they invaded.

== Nazi occupation ==
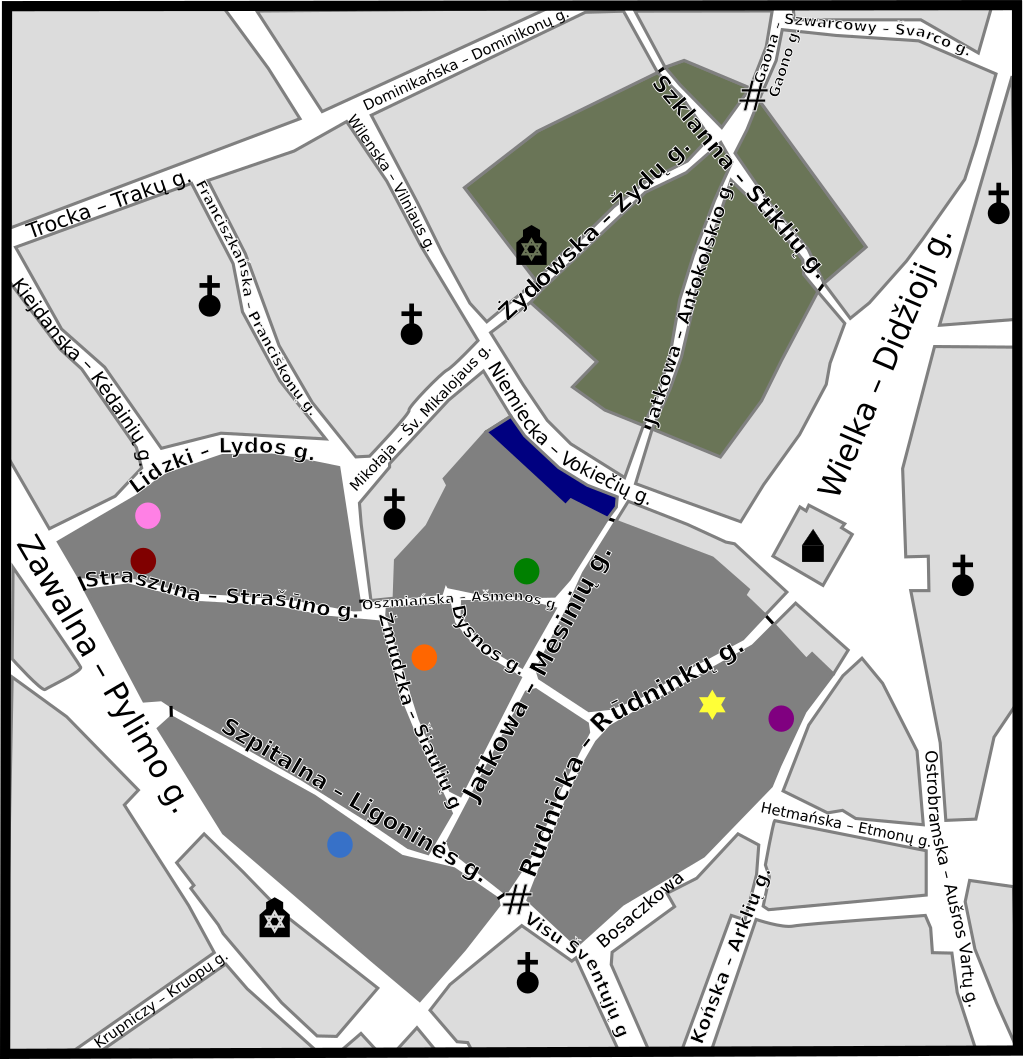
Map of the Vilna Ghetto. The greenish section is the smaller ghetto liquidated in October 1941, and the grey section is the larger ghetto liquidated in September 1943. The black # is the gate into the ghetto, the yellow star of David symbol is the Judenrat offices. The green dot is the FPO headquarters.

When Nazi Germany invaded Lithuania in June 1941, Glazman was in Vilnius and was taken outside the city for forced labor by the Germans. In November, he returned to Vilnius and was forced into the Vilna Ghetto where he organized an underground group of Betar members. He was also a member of the Jewish Ghetto Police, partly to further the resistance activities he was involved in. By December 1941 he had become deputy chief of the ghetto police. Although Glazman wasn't from Vilnius, he was respected by the inhabitants of the ghetto for his pre-war activities. The ghetto administration found that employing him was useful to them, although they did not know of his resistance efforts.

Glazman helped found the Fareynikte Partizaner Organizatsye (FPO) in January 1942. The organizational meeting was held in Glazman's apartment on 21 January 1942. It was a militarized underground resistance group against the Germans. The head was Yitzhak Wittenberg, and Glazman was one of two deputy commanders of the FPO, as well as being in charge of its intelligence gathering. The other deputy was Abba Kovner. The FPO's leadership was from a range of political backgrounds – Wittenberg was a Communist and Kovner came from a left-wing Zionist background in contrast to Glazman's right-wing Zionism. The three men worked well together despite their differing political beliefs. Glazman also was in charge of two of the FPO's battalions, which over time grew to about 100 to 120 individuals. In June 1942, Glazman changed jobs from the ghetto police force to the ghetto's housing department, where he was able to help find hiding locations for members of the FPO and others who were without official status in the ghetto. Glazman also helped to select ex-military personnel to help train FPO members.

Glazman's relationship with the head of the Vilna Ghetto, Jacob Gens, was difficult. The main reason was Glazman's resistance involvement. In the second half of 1942, Gens tried to send Glazman to the nearby ghetto at Švenčionys to head up the housing department. Glazman refused as he feared that it was an attempt to force him to participate in choosing which Jews would be deported to forced labor or extermination. Glazman was arrested by the Jewish ghetto police in October 1942 and spent several weeks in jail until being released in December.

On 25 July 1943, Gens again attempted to send Glazman to a nearby labor camp, and when Glazman refused to go, he was arrested by the Jewish ghetto police. When he was being escorted to the ghetto gate by policemen for transport to the Rzesza Ghetto, the FPO attacked and freed him. Gens then threatened that if Glazman did not go to Rzesza, Gens would resign as head of the ghetto, and the FPO would have to take over the administration. Gens also promised that Glazman would be able to return to Vilna within a short period of time. Glazman and the FPO leadership agreed to his surrender and he went to Rzesza, but returned, as promised, in two weeks when that ghetto was dissolved. The freeing of Glazman was the signal to the ghetto inhabitants that the FPO existed and that there was a group organizing for armed resistance against the Germans in the ghetto.

Glazman was questioned repeatedly by the police over the next few months, but was not arrested again. After Gens' surrender of Wittenberg to the Germans, Glazman led a group of Jewish fighters out of the ghetto into the nearby forest to form a partisan band. Glazman's escape to the forest was mainly caused by his belief that the ghetto inhabitants would not follow the FPO into an armed revolt. He was also suffering from the persecution of the ghetto's administrative leaders.

Although the Germans ambushed Glazman's group and killed a third of them, the rest reached the forest in July 1943. They left behind documents in the ambush, however, and the Germans were able to identify members of the group as being from the Vilna Ghetto. Thirty-two friends and family members were rounded up by the Germans and executed in Ponary.

== Partisan activities and death ==
Once in the Naroch Forest, Glazman's group formed a partisan band named "Nekama" ("Revenge") and became a part of a larger Soviet-organized partisan force commanded by Fyodor Markov. But in September, the Soviets stopped supporting the Jewish unit, so Glazman and his followers switched their allegiance to a local Lithuanian-commanded partisan organization. Other partisan bands in the area directed anti-Semitic attacks and persecutions at Glazman's group, and the group was inexperienced at living rough in the forest.

German forces in the area of Vilnius began to hunt in earnest for partisans in September 1943. Glazman's band attempted to leave the area but did not succeed. They were discovered on 7 October 1943, and all but one of the group were killed. The one survivor was a young woman.
