= Partizaner lid =

Partizaner lid (Partisan Song) might refer to two Yiddish songs by Hirsh Glick:

- "Zog nit keyn mol" (Never say), a rallying cry to never give up and continue fighting, became a hymn of Jewish partisans
- "Shtil, di nakht iz oysgeshternt" (Quiet, the Night is Full of Stars), a celebration of a sabotage action by Vitka Kempner
