= Partisan Song =

Partisan Song or Partisan's Song may refer to:

- Partizaner lid (disambiguation), Yiddish World War II songs
- Chant des Partisans, French World War II song
- Marsz Gwardii Ludowej, Polish World War II song
- Po dolinam i po vzgoriam, Russian Civil War song
