= Rozka Korczak =

Polish partisan leader in World War II

Rozka or Ruzka Korczak (1921, Płock – 1988) was a Jewish partisan leader during World War II. A Polish Jew, she served in the Fareynikte Partizaner Organizatsye and, alongside Vitka Kempner and founder Abba Kovner, assumed a leadership role in its successor group, the Avengers (Nakam).

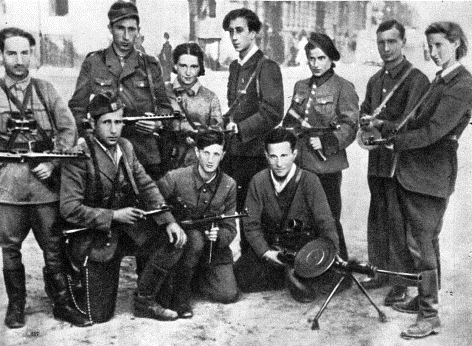
Rozka Korczak (standing, third from the right) with members of the FPO in the Vilna Ghetto. Abba Kovner is to her right, and Vitka Kempner is at far right.

== Early life ==
Korczak was born in April 1921 in Bielsko, to a cattle dealer. Her family moved to a small village in Płock where she attended public school. In eighth grade, she organized a Jewish student strike to protest Anti-Semitism in the school. As a teenager, she joined a Zionist organization called HaShomer HaTzair (the young guard).

== During World War Two ==
During the invasion of Poland by Germany in 1939, Korczak fled to Lituania and met Vitka Kempner in VilnIUS thanks to HaShomer HaTzair. Upon Germany's invasion of the Soviet Union, she co-founded the Fareynikte Partizaner Organizatsye (FPO) with Abba Kovner and Kempner in 1942. They smuggled weapons into the Vilna Ghetto and smuggled Jews out.

As the situation worsened in the ghetto, she left it in September 1943 with the last group of fighters passing through the sewers and took refuge in the forests of Rūdninkai and Naroch. After the Red Army occupied Vilnius in July 1944, she and her companions focused on helping Jewish refugees and their emigration to Palestine. She arrived there on December 12, 1944.
