= Alexander Bogen =

Polish-Israeli artist and partisan (1916–2010)

Alexander Bogen אלכסנדר בוגן
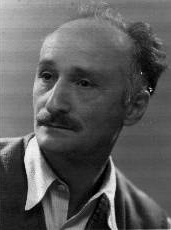
- Alexander Bogen
- Born: Alexander Katzenbogen; 24 January 1916; Tartu, Estonia, Russian Empire
- Died: 20 October 2010 (aged 94); Tel Aviv, Israel
- Education: Wilno University; Academie des Beaux Arts
- Known for: Painting, Sculpture, Book Illustration and for being a partisan through the Holocaust
- Notable work: Apocalipse
- Movement: Social realism, lyrical abstraction, abstract expressionism, tachisme

Alexander Bogen (Hebrew: אלכסנדר בוגן; born 24 January 1916 – 20 October 2010) was a Polish-Israeli visual artist, a decorated leader of partisans during World War II, a key player in 20th century Yiddish culture, and one of the trailblazers for art education and Artists' associations in the emerging state of Israel.

== Biography ==
Alexander Bogen was born in Tartu, Estonia and brought up in Wilno. As a young boy he adhered to the values of the Yiddish culture of Yung-Vilne, as well as to the modern Polish culture. After completing his studies at the gymnasium, he was accepted to the Stefan Batory art academy affiliated with the Wilno University, where he studied painting and sculpture. His parents were physicians. His father came from a secular family and his mother was the daughter of Rabbi Tuvia Lobitzki, the rabbi of Wołkowysk, Poland. His studies were interrupted by World War II. Bogen joined the partisans and became a commander of the Jewish partisan unit in the Narocz Forests. He buried many of the drawings he made at this time near Lake Narocz. He returned to the ghetto in September 1943 and helped to facilitate the rescue of members of the United Partisan Organization (FPO), a Jewish underground movement active in the ghetto and led by poet Abba Kovner, Bogen's school friend.

When the Vilna Ghetto was about to be destroyed, Bogen and his partisans tried to rescue some key people, one of whom was Abraham Sutzkever. With the help of the soviet partisans, they managed to finally smuggle him into Moscow along with some of Bogen's drawings, which were eventually exhibited in Moscow

According to the Russian State Archive of Literature and Art (RGALI), he was head of the Department of Arts of the Lithuanian SSR from 5 September 1944 to February 1945.

After the war Bogen returned to his studies, finished his academic degree and was mastered as an artist of monumental painting at the USB Academy of Art in Vilna. In 1947, he taught as a professor at The Academy of Fine Arts In Łódź and became a well-known artist, set designer and book illustrator.

Alongside his recognition as a Polish Artist and war hero, receiving several accolades and awards as well as a large retrospective exhibition (Łódź State Museum, 1950) – Bogen was also very active in the resuscitation of the cultural life of the Jewish Community in post war Poland.

In 1951, Bogen and his wife immigrated to Israel and settled in Tel Aviv.

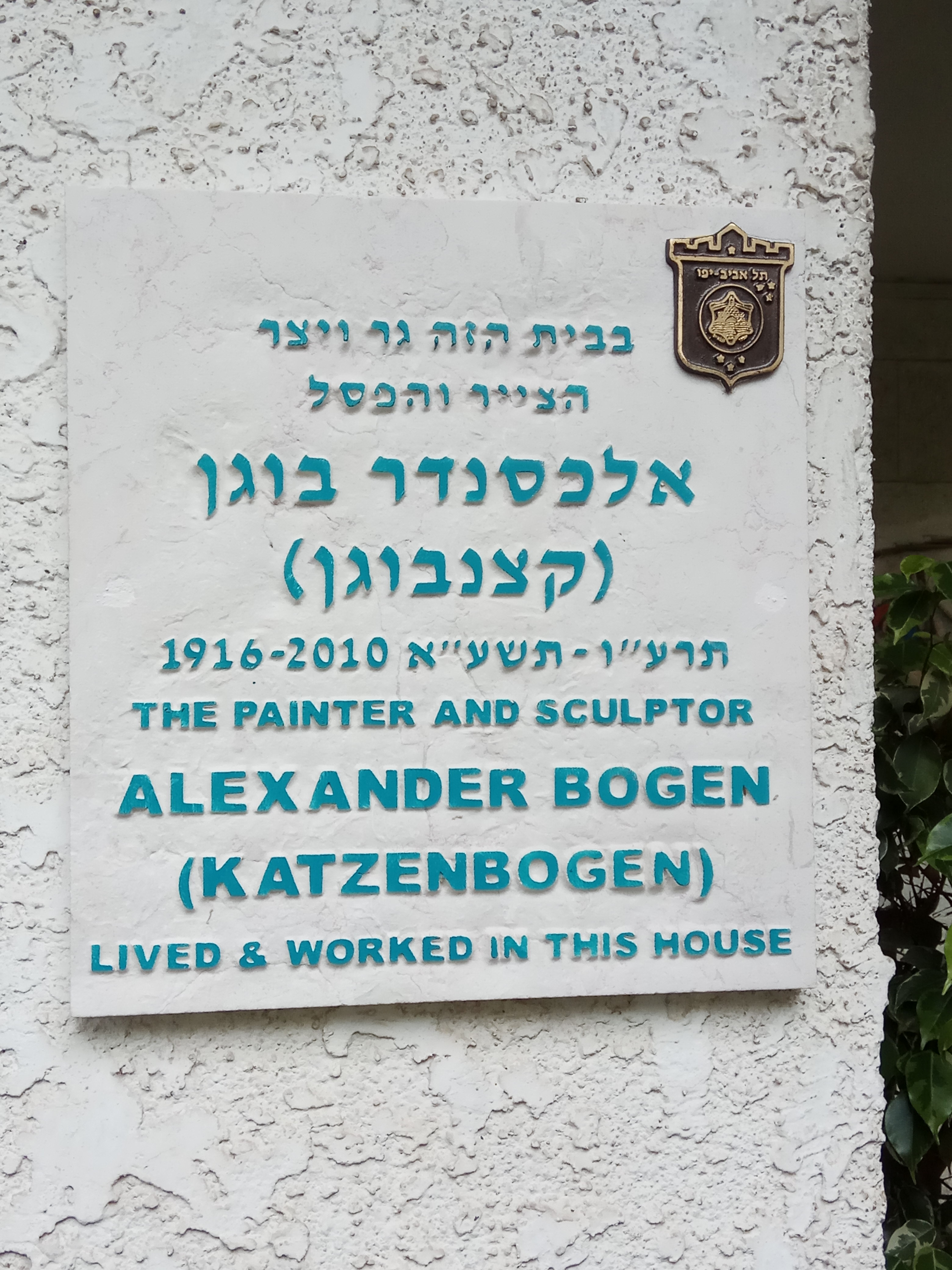
Memorial plaque to Alexander Bogen in Tel Aviv

During his time in Israel, Bogen continued his cultural and educational activities in the arts. In 1957 he initiated the art program in WIZO France – Ironi Yud-Dalet high school in Tel Aviv and lead it for 22 years. Bogen completed his academic studies of art at the Ecole des Beaux Arts in Paris and was an art lecturer in the Hebrew University in Jerusalem. Bogen continued painting, drawing and sculpting until his death at the age of 94 in Tel Aviv on 20 October 2010.

In July 2018, Mayor Ron Huldai, on behalf of the city of Tel Aviv, has inaugurated a Memorial plaque in Bogen's honor on the house where he lived and worked.

== Resistance through art ==
Bogen continued to draw during the war, documenting what he saw:

We saw abandoned children. We saw people being led to the slaughter.

I did not lay down my pencil for a moment.

An artist condemned to death portraying people condemned to extermination...

I sketched the forest, my brothers-in-arms, the battle itself. There was no table. There were no paints. There was no paper.

I found packing paper. I made ink from blueberries, fixer out of pulverized milk and burnt dry branches for charcoal for my sketches.

I asked myself why I was drawing, when I was fighting day and night…

This was something similar to biological continuation. Every man, every people, is interested in continuing his people, his family,

in bringing children into the world for the future – in leaving this one thing.

Another motivation was to get information to the so-called free world,

but mostly Being creative during the Holocaust was also a show of protest -

people facing brutal danger, facing death, react in their own different way.

the artist's reaction is artistic. This is his weapon.

== Selected solo exhibitions ==
- 1949 Municipal Museum, Breslau, Poland
- 1950 Municipal Museum, Lodz, Poland
- 1951 Yad-Lebanim Museum, Petah Tikva
- 1956 Museum of Art, Ein-Harod
- 1961 The Tel Aviv Museum of Art
- 1961 Artists’ House, Haifa
- 1962 Artists’ House, Jerusalem
- 1962 St. Placide Gallery, Paris
- 1963 Rider Gallery, Los Angeles
- 1963 Merkup Gallery, Mexico
- 1975 Glezer Gallery, N.Y.
- 1975 Chelsea Gallery, São Paulo, Brazil
- 1976 Yad-Lebanim Museum, Petah Tikva
- 1979 Museum of Israel Art, Ramat-Gan
- 1980 Artists’ House, Jerusalem;
- 1980 Artists’ House, Tel Aviv;
- 1980 Old Jaffa Gallery
- 1981 Citè Internationale des Arts, Paris
- 1984 Bat-Yam Museum, Bat Yam
- 1985 Institute Français, Tel Aviv;
- 1985 Petah Tikva Museum, Israel
- 1987 Herzog Anton Ulrich Museum, Braunschweig
- 1988 Museum Zons, Dormagen Neuss;
- 1988 Kreishaus, Ludwigsburg
- 1991 Artists’ House, Tel Aviv
- 1992 State Gallery, Lodz
- 1993 State Abakus Gallery, Warsaw
- 1994 State Gallery, Kraków
- 1995 Rathaus, Gerlingen, Germany;
- 1996 Vesoul Museum, France
- 1998 Beit Ariela Municipal Gallery, Tel Aviv
- 2001 The Ghetto Fighters’ House Museum, Kibbutz Lohamei Haghetaot, Israel
- 2002 Alexander Bogen – Drawings for Poems in Yiddish, Reuben and Edith Hecht Museum, University of Haifa
- 2003 Drawing and painting exhibition, Beit Shalom Aleichem, Tel Aviv
- 2005 Drawing and painting exhibition, Bar'Am Museum
- 2009 Whitebox Gallery, Munich
- 2010 Kreishaus, Ludwigsburg
- 2010 The Russian Institut, Tel Aviv

An exhibition of Bogen's work was held at the Hecht Museum in Haifa. His drawings, especially those that survived from his partisan days, offer a gallery of characters and document the history of a people fighting for its life during the Holocaust. Among the drawings on show were illustrations for poems by two Yiddish poets: Gebirtig and Abraham Sutzkever.

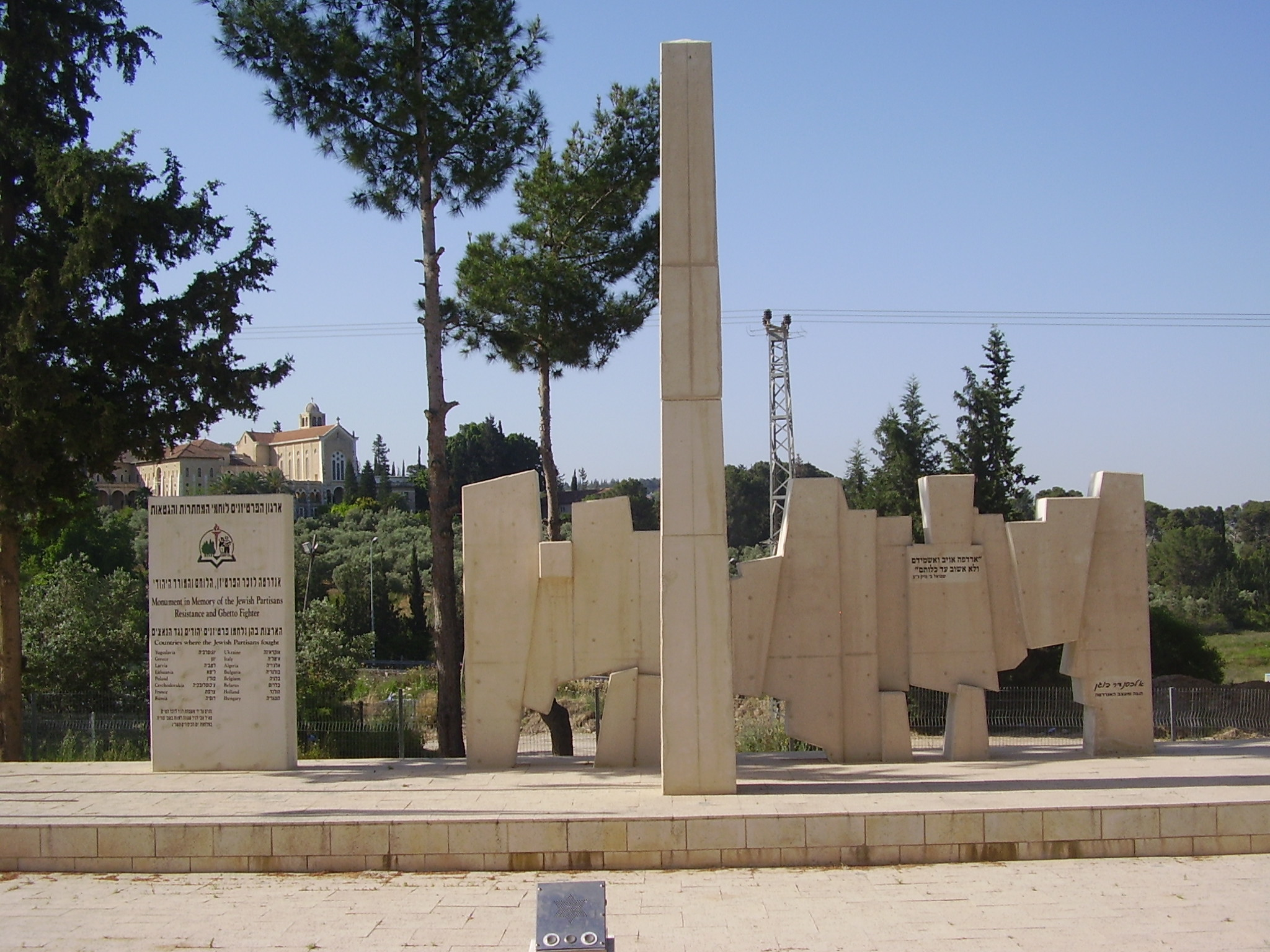

== Monuments and murals ==
- “Revolt” – Partisan Museum, Tel Aviv
- “Holocaust” – Partisan Museum, Tel Aviv
- Vitrage, Jabotinsky Institute, Tel Aviv
- Vitrage, 14th Vocational High School, Kiryal Hachinuch, Tel Aviv
- Memorial Monument, Commemorating the Holocaust and the Revolt, Latroun Museum, Jerusalem

== Awards ==
- 1951 State Prize, Polish Government Prize
- 1961 The Histadrut Prize, Israel
- 1962 The Israel Ministry of Education & Culture Prize
- 1980 Prize of the Sea League of Israel
- 1982 The Negev Prize
- 1993 Medal of the City of Vesoul, France
- 1995 Shalom Aleichem Prize, Israel

== See also ==
- Official Website
- Visual arts in Israel
- The Israel Museum, Jerusalem
- Alexander Bogen Collection at the United States Holocaust Memorial Museum, Washington D.C.
- "the Pen and the Sword" - online exhibition from Yad Vashem, Jerusalem.
