= Nechama Hendel =

Israeli singer (1936–1998)

Nechama Hendel נחמה הנדל
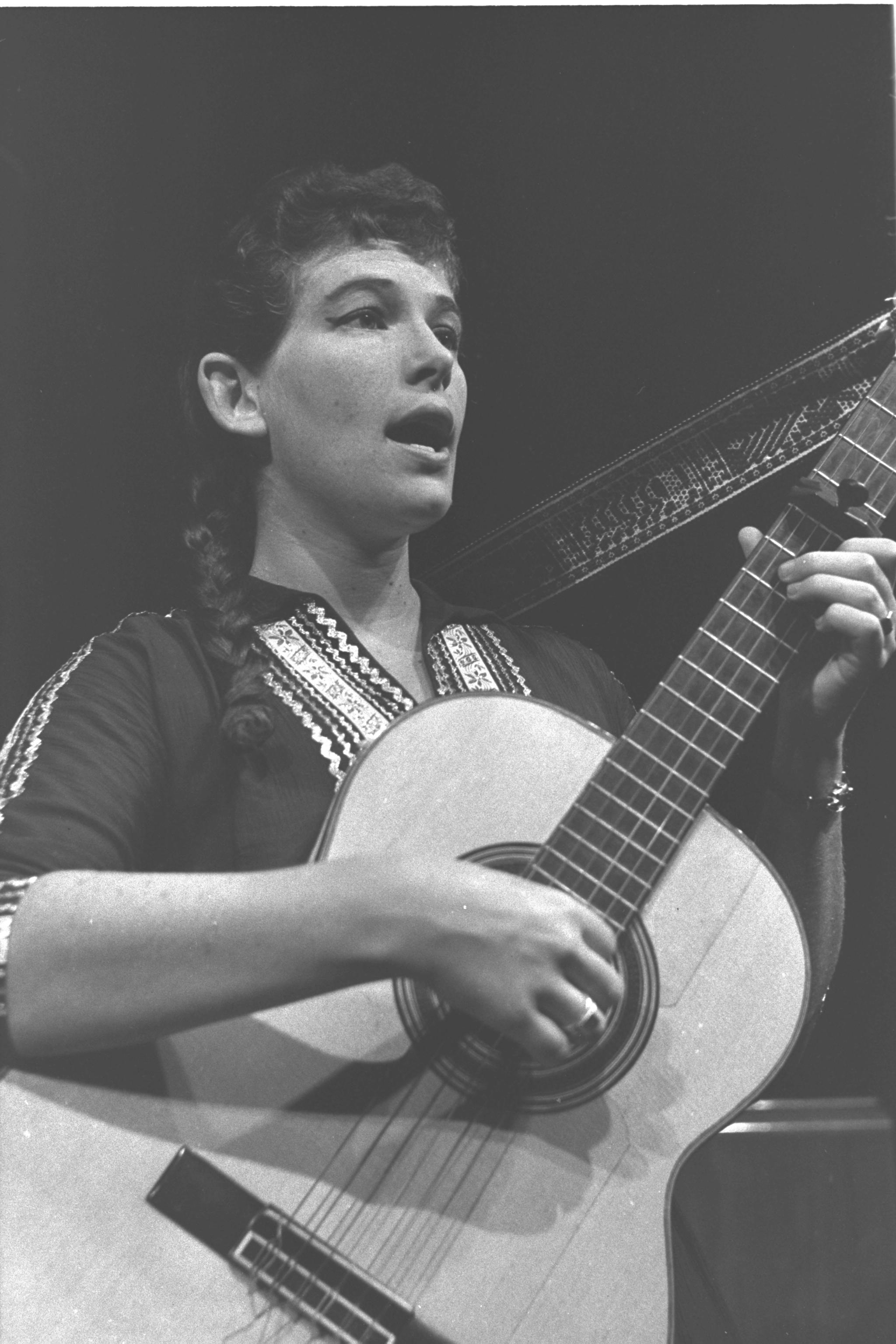
- Hendel in 1961

Background information
- Born: 22 August 1936; Jerusalem, Mandatory Palestine
- Died: 30 September 1998 (aged 62) Kfar Saba, Israel
- Genres: Folk
- Occupation: Singer
- Instruments: Vocals; guitar
- Years active: 1957–1998

Nechama Hendel (Hebrew: נחמה הנדל; 22 August 1936 – 30 September 1998) was an Israeli singer.

== Biography ==
Nechama Hendel was born in the Rehavia neighborhood of Jerusalem. Her parents, Michael and Chana immigrated to Palestine from Poland. Her father served for many years as chief inspector of history at the Israel Ministry of Education. Her older sister, Tamar Gadot, was born in 1934. Nechama attended high school in the Hebrew University Secondary School.

In 1956, she moved to Paris to study acting but returned in 1957 to join the newly founded ensemble Batzal Yarok, with former colleagues from the Nahal troupe.

In 1969 she married Leonard Regnier and settled in West Germany. They had two children, Dilia (b. 1970) and Michael (b. 1972).

== Singing career ==
Hendel began her singing career in the IDF Nahal music troupe. In the 1950s, she performed as part of a duo, "Ran veNama," – with Ran Eliran. In 1958, Eliran and Hendel were introduced to American audiences by their appearance on The Ed Sullivan Show performing "Tzena, Tzena, Tzena".

Hendel became world-famous with her smash hit "Machar" ("Tomorrow") composed by Naomi Shemer featured on the "Jerusalem of Gold" album. She recorded many more of Shemer's songs.

Hendel recorded not only in Hebrew, but in Yiddish as well and was one of the artists included on a Yiddish compilation called "Songs of The Vilna Ghetto" for CBS Records in Israel.

In 1998, Hendel voiced Grandmother Willow in the Hebrew version of the animated movie Pocahontas II: Journey to a New World, and also Grandmother Fa in the Hebrew version of the animated movie Mulan, which was released three months before her death from cardiac arrest on 29 September.

== See also ==
- Music of Israel
