= Amos Meller =

Israeli composer and conductor

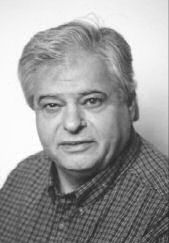

Background information
- Born: 1938; Ein HaHoresh, Mandatory Palestine
- Died: July 23, 2007 (aged 69) Tel Aviv, Israel

Amos Meller (Hebrew: עמוס מלר; 1938 – January 23, 2007) is best remembered as an Israeli composer and conductor.

== Life ==
He was born in Kibbutz Ein HaHoresh, which his father, Mordechai Meller, was a founder of.

In his lifetime, he was a member of the Israeli volleyball team, a flutist, a violinist, and a poet.

During his career he led orchestras in China, Moscow, and France. In March 2003 he was asked to direct the Beijing Philharmonic Orchestra and also the Taipei Philharmonic Orchestra of Taiwan. He was the first Israeli to direct these orchestras.

Meller died at age 69 from heart failure in Tel Aviv.
