= Anna Borkowska (Mother Bertranda) =

Polish former Dominican nun

Mother Bertranda, O.P. (née Janina Siestrzewitowska; 1900–1988), later known as Anna Borkowska, was a Polish cloistered Dominican nun who served as the prioress of her monastery in Kolonia Wileńska near Wilno (now Pavilnys near Vilnius, Lithuania). (Note: The monastery was established in 1938 in the pre-war Second Polish Republic. It was closed in 1948 in the post-war Lithuanian SSR. It continued to function in secret and was officially reestablished in 1996. It is located in the present-day Kalvos street 17 (54°41′35″N 25°19′19″E). Source: Jagminas, Leonardas (2004-02-02). "Dominikõnės". Visuotinė lietuvių enciklopedija (in Lithuanian). Mokslo ir enciklopedijų leidybos centras. Archived from the original on 2018-03-11.) She was a graduate of the University of Kraków who had entered the monastery after her studies. During World War II, under her leadership, the nuns of the monastery sheltered 17 young Jewish activists from Vilnius Ghetto and helped the Jewish Partisan Organization (FPO) by smuggling weapons. In recognition of this, in 1984 she was awarded the title of Righteous among the Nations by Yad Vashem.

== Hiding Jews ==
Vilnius (Vilna) was taken over by the Germans on 24 June 1941, in Operation Barbarossa, and the killing of the Jews began almost immediately. Mother Bertranda first inquired about saving Jews following the start of the Ponary massacre in July 1941. She initially sought to gain the support of the Wilno Catholic leadership, but they rebuffed her efforts out of fear that the Nazi German occupation forces would destroy church property and kill any Christians found to be aiding Jews.

Acting on her own initiative, Mother Bertranda then took in 17 members of Hashomer Hatzair, a local Zionist group, and hid them within the grounds of her monastery. The activists included Abba Kovner, the movement's leader, Abraham Sutzkever, Arie Wilner and Edek Boraks. They helped the nuns with working their fields, while Kovner, realizing the goals of Hitler's Final Solution, worked on organizing a political resistance to the occupation and writing his manifesto for the later uprising. When several of her nuns objected, Mother Bertranda reportedly threatened them with expulsion from the monastery and excommunication from the faith. Some of the Hashomer Hatzair members later decided to leave their monastery hideout and to return to the Jewish Ghetto in Vilnius, where they organized an underground resistance movement, the Fareynikte Partizaner Organizatsye (FPO).

== Helping Jewish resistance ==
Soon after that, Mother Bertranda left the monastery and went to the Ghetto to volunteer her services. She was dissuaded from this by Kovner, who asked that she organize the procurement of supplies instead. She and the other Dominican nuns then took it upon themselves to help the Jewish resistance by smuggling in arms and ammunition. The other nuns of the community included Sister Bernadeta (Julia Michrowska), Sister Cecylia (Maria Roszak), Sister Diana (Helena Frackiewicz), Sister Imelda (Maria Neugebauer), Sister Jordana (Maria Ostrejko), Sister Małgorzata (Irena Adamek) and Sister Stefania (Stanisława Bednarska). In this they became among the first to supply hand grenades and other weapons to the Vilnius Ghetto underground. Between August and September 1943, the ghetto was liquidated and some 12,000 men, women and children were deported to camps in Estonia. The uprising, organized by FPO on 1 September 1943 was crushed. The final Nazi destruction of whatever remained of the Ghetto followed.

In September 1943, Mother Bertranda was arrested by the Nazi German occupation authorities and sent to a labor camp at Pravieniškės near Kaunas. (Note: Prior to the Second World War, Kaunas had a significant Jewish population. According to the Russian census of 1897, the population of Kovno (Ковно, or Kaunas in Lithuanian) was 25.8 percent Russian, 22.7 percent Polish, and only 6.6 percent Lithuanian. Source: Blobaum, Robert (1984). Feliks Dzierzynski and the SDKPIL: A study of the origins of Polish Communism. East European Monographs. p. 42. ISBN 0880330465 – via books.google.com.) The monastery was closed and the community of nuns was forced to disperse. After the war, Mother Bertranda asked for a dispensation from her vows and left the monastery, where she adopted the name Anna Borkowska. She maintained her religious devotion after being released from her monastic vows.

== Recognition ==
In 1984, Borkowska, now living alone in a small apartment in Warsaw, was awarded the title of Righteous among the Nations by Yad Vashem. Abba Kovner, one of the young Jews who had been saved by Borkowska, personally presented a medal to her at a ceremony in Poland. She and [Sister] Cecylia Roszak were two members of this monastic community to be honored, according to the statistics given by Yad Vashem.

== See also ==
- Polish Righteous among the Nations
- List of Poles: Holocaust resisters
