= Bracha Eden and Alexander Tamir =

Israeli pianists who performed as a duo

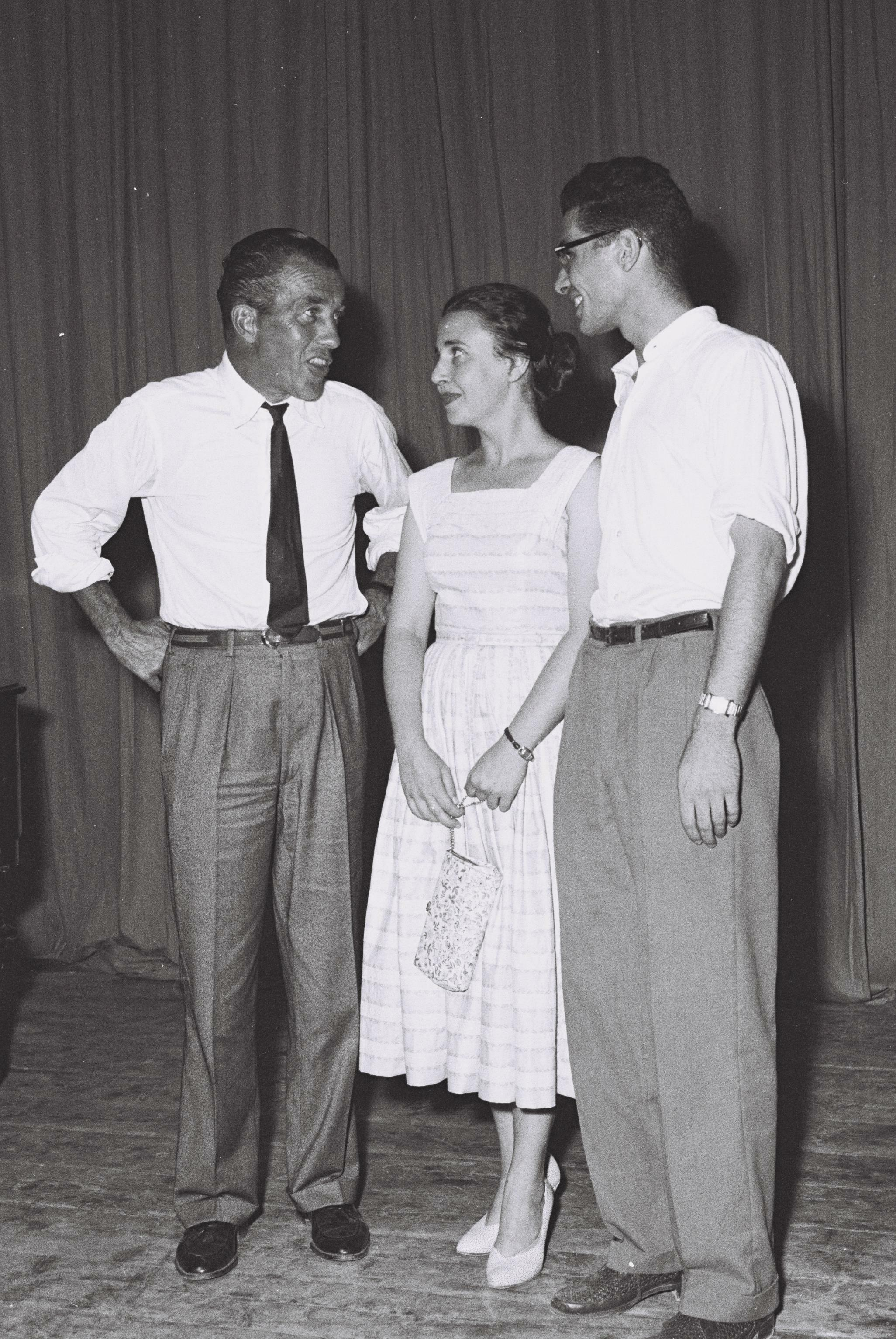
- Bracha Eden and Alexander Tamir with Ed Sullivan (left), 1958

Background information
- Genres: Classical
- Occupation: Pianists
- Years active: 1952–2019

Bracha Eden
- Born: 15 July 1928
- Died: 23 May 2006 (aged 77)

Alexander Tamir
- Born: Alexander Wolkovsky; 2 April 1931; Vilnius, Lithuania
- Died: 15 August 2019 (aged 88)

Bracha Eden (Hebrew: ברכה עדן; 15 July 1928 – 23 May 2006) and Alexander Tamir (Hebrew: אלכסנדר תמיר; 2 April 1931 – 15 August 2019) were Israeli pianists who performed as a duo.

== Biography ==
Alexander Wolkovsky (later Tamir) was born in Vilnius, Lithuania. In 1942, as an eleven-year-old boy, he composed a Yiddish song called "Shtiler, shtiler" ("Quiet, quiet"; also known as "Ponar" in Hebrew), for a music competition held in the Jewish ghetto. The song was set as a lullaby in order to confuse the Nazi occupiers. Many of the intended singers were killed before they could compete. The story of this episode and Tamir's return to his birthplace is told in the Israeli film Ponar.

He changed his name to Tamir after settling in Jerusalem after World War II. Very little is recorded about the life of Bracha Eden. She was the elder partner and appears to have been publicity-shy. In her professional life she was overshadowed by her partner.

The duo met while studying at the Rubin Academy with Alexander Schroeder, a pupil of Artur Schnabel. Schroeder encouraged them to play together and they formed their piano duo in 1952. They continued their studies with Vronsky & Babin in the United States.

== Music career ==
Their duo debut was in 1954 in Israel. They won the 1957 Vercelli Competition and toured regularly in many countries, appearing both in recital and as concerto performers with the great orchestras of the world. They later became senior professors at the Rubin Academy, and Tamir was at one time dean of the academy.

Tamir and Eden founded the Max Targ Chamber Music Center in Ein Kerem in 1968, and Tamir founded the Young Artists Competition and the Israel Chopin Society. He was a member of the board of the International Federation of Chopin Societies.

During the 1990s they began to perform and teach regularly in China, Russia, and Poland, and in 1997 they became directors of the International Duo Piano Seminary.

== Repertoire ==
Some of the duo's earlier recordings, originally issued under names "Bracha Eden and Alexander Tamir" now appear under the names "Bracha Eden and Alexander Wolkovski".

Eden and Tamir recorded the complete works for two pianos and piano duet of Brahms, Mendelssohn, Mozart, Rachmaninoff, Schubert and Schumann, and individual works by Bach, Bartók, Debussy, Poulenc, Ravel and many others. They were awarded the Grand Prix du Disque for their recording of Brahms Sonata in F minor for Two Pianos, Op. 34b.

They gave the American premiere of Lutosławski's Paganini Variations (1955) and, at the suggestion of Stravinsky himself, were the first to perform and record the piano duet version of The Rite of Spring. They also recorded the four Brahms symphonies in the composer's own transcription for two pianos. They have also presented neglected works for two pianos, including music by Clementi, Dussek and Hummel.

Tamir made several transcriptions for piano duo and duet and wrote a few works for piano duo.
