= Shtil, di nakht iz oysgeshternt =

Yiddish resistance song

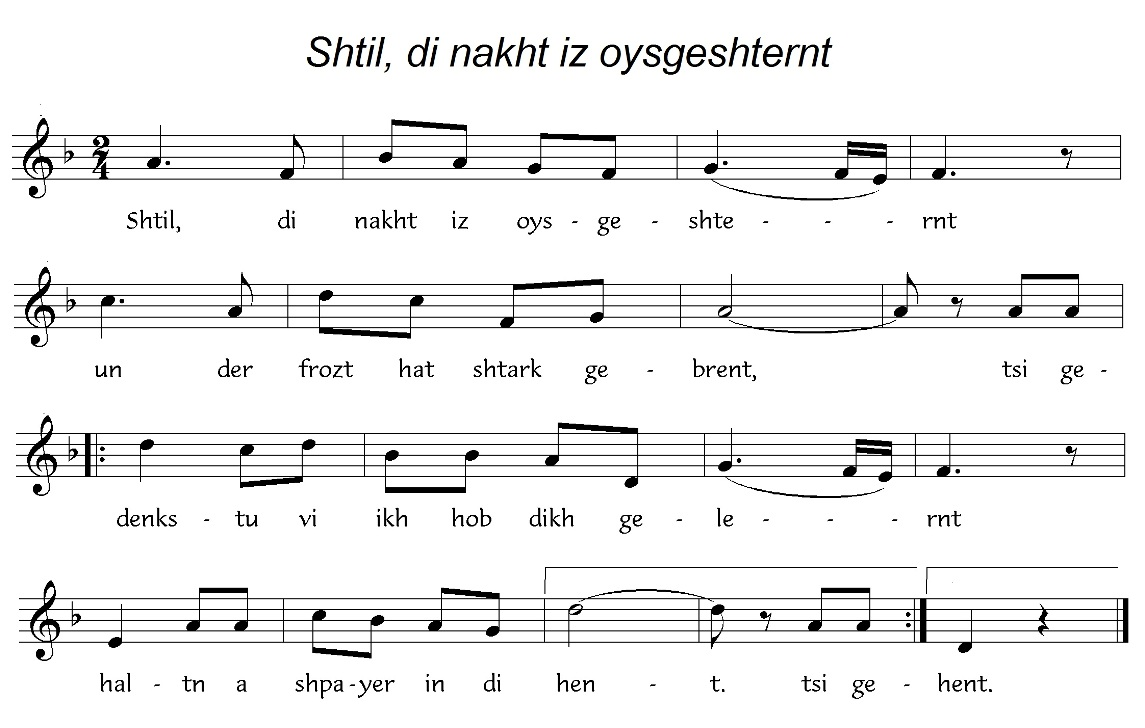

"Shtil, di nakht iz oysgeshternt" ("Quiet, the Night is Full of Stars"; Yiddish: שטיל, די נאַכט איז אױסגעשטערנט) or "Partizaner lid" ("Partisan Song") is a Yiddish song written in summer 1942 by Hirsh Glick, a young Jewish inmate of the Vilna Ghetto. It is set to a melody of a popular song by Mordkhe Gebirtig ("Hey klezmorim, gute brider").

It is a love song that starts with conventional lyrics about a quiet night and sky full of stars, but quickly turns to the realities of war. The song is addressed to a beautiful woman who succeeded in ambushing a Nazi convoy. The song celebrates Vitka Kempner, a Jewish partisan, and her successful attack, an act of sabotage, on a German train in the Vilnius sector. It was the first attack by the Fareynikte Partizaner Organizatsye (FPO), organization of Jewish partisans from the Vilna Ghetto. Kempner and Itzik Matskevich threw a hand grenade at the convoy damaging it.

The snow and frost mentioned in the lyrics are poetic liberties as the attack occurred in summer 1942. The song is noted for its celebration of a woman partisan – active fighting and resistance were not traditional roles for a woman, even during the war. Ruth Rubin also noted the use of three words – shpayer (a local word from Vilnius), nagan (a Russian term referring to Nagant M1895), and pistoyl – to denote an automatic pistol. Perhaps this was meant to show multiculturalism of the region.

It appears on Pete Seeger's We Shall Overcome - The Complete Carnegie Hall Concert., recorded June 8, 1963, under the title Schtille Di Nacht in listings.

== See also ==
- "Zog nit keynmol", another song by Glick
