= Ein HaHoresh =

Kibbutz in central Israel

Ein HaHoresh: עֵין הַחוֹרֵשׁ (Hebrew); عين هحوريش (Arabic)
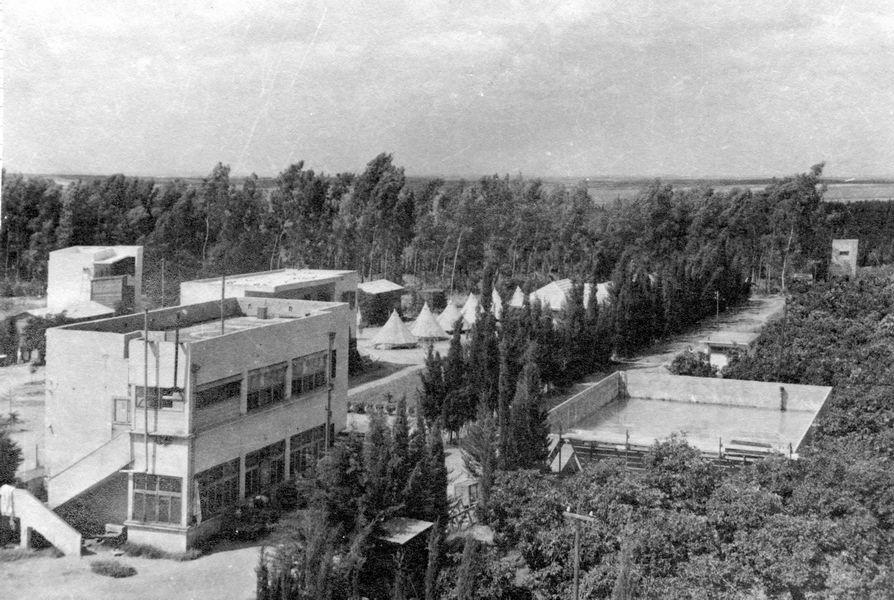
- Ein Hahoresh, c. 1940
- Etymology: 'The Plowman's Spring'
- Location within Central Israel Location within Israel
- Coordinates: 32°23′18″N 34°56′26″E
- Country: Israel
- District: Central
- Subdistrict: HaSharon
- Council: Hefer Valley
- Affiliation: Kibbutz Movement
- Founded: 1931
- Founder: Hashomer Hatzair
- Population (2024): 891

Ein HaHoresh (Hebrew: עֵין הַחוֹרֵשׁ, lit. 'the plower's spring/the plowman's fountain') is a kibbutz in the Sharon region of the Central District of Israel. Located to the north of Netanya and to the south of Hadera, it falls under the jurisdiction of the Hefer Valley Regional Council. In 2024 it had a population of 891.

== History ==
It was founded in November 1931 by Hashomer Hatzair members from Eastern Europe. It was one of the first Zionist settlements in the northern part of the Emek Hefer. The name of the kibbutz originates from a mistranslation of the Arabic name for the area, Wadi al-Hawarith (Arabic: وادي الحوارث) which was mistakenly translated as "valley of ploughmen." In fact, it originally referred to a Bedouin tribe that had arrived in the area from Egypt.

The kibbutz was cordoned off and occupied by the British in December 1945 in connection with the struggle for free immigration. It was cordoned off and occupied by the British again in June 1946 along with its neighbor, Givat Haim. As part of the war effort, the kibbutz stepped up its food production. By 1947 the kibbutz had a population of 450. In 2005 it went through a privatization process.

== Economy ==
Pachmas Packaging, founded on the kibbutz in 1935, manufactures and markets rigid packaging for industrial markets. Other economic branches are intensive citrus farming and milch cattle breeding.

== Climate ==
Climate data for Ein HaHoresh (1991–2020)
Month	Jan	Feb	Mar	Apr	May	Jun	Jul	Aug	Sep	Oct	Nov	Dec	Year
Record high °C (°F)	27.9 (82.2)	32.7 (90.9)	38.4 (101.1)	40.9 (105.6)	42.6 (108.7)	42.4 (108.3)	40.4 (104.7)	38.7 (101.7)	43.5 (110.3)	41.2 (106.2)	36.1 (97.0)	31.0 (87.8)	43.5 (110.3)
Mean daily maximum °C (°F)	17.5 (63.5)	18.5 (65.3)	20.9 (69.6)	24.2 (75.6)	27.2 (81.0)	29.1 (84.4)	30.9 (87.6)	31.5 (88.7)	30.7 (87.3)	28.8 (83.8)	24.4 (75.9)	19.6 (67.3)	25.3 (77.5)
Daily mean °C (°F)	12.2 (54.0)	12.8 (55.0)	14.7 (58.5)	17.5 (63.5)	20.7 (69.3)	23.3 (73.9)	25.6 (78.1)	26.3 (79.3)	24.8 (76.6)	22.1 (71.8)	18.0 (64.4)	14.0 (57.2)	19.3 (66.7)
Mean daily minimum °C (°F)	6.9 (44.4)	7.0 (44.6)	8.5 (47.3)	10.7 (51.3)	14.2 (57.6)	17.5 (63.5)	20.4 (68.7)	21.1 (70.0)	18.8 (65.8)	15.4 (59.7)	11.5 (52.7)	8.4 (47.1)	13.4 (56.1)
Record low °C (°F)	−1.9 (28.6)	−2.7 (27.1)	−0.1 (31.8)	0.9 (33.6)	5.4 (41.7)	8.8 (47.8)	13.7 (56.7)	15.0 (59.0)	8.8 (47.8)	7.4 (45.3)	0.3 (32.5)	−0.5 (31.1)	−2.7 (27.1)
Average precipitation mm (inches)	155.6 (6.13)	101.5 (4.00)	54.7 (2.15)	18.6 (0.73)	3.8 (0.15)	0.5 (0.02)	0.0 (0.0)	0.1 (0.00)	2.1 (0.08)	31.9 (1.26)	81.9 (3.22)	135.8 (5.35)	586.5 (23.09)
Average precipitation days (≥ 1.0 mm)	10.9	8.7	5.6	2.3	0.8	0.1	0.0	0.0	0.5	2.6	5.8	9.2	46.5
Source: NOAA

== Gallery ==
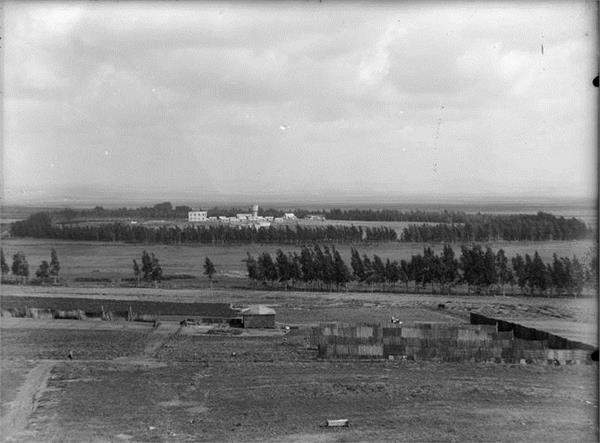
Ein HaHoresh 1935

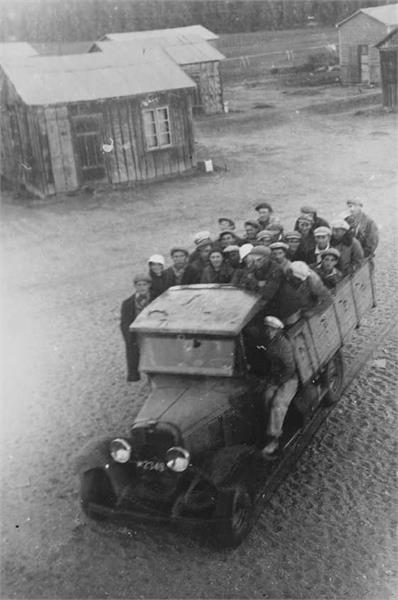
Ein HaHoresh workers 1935

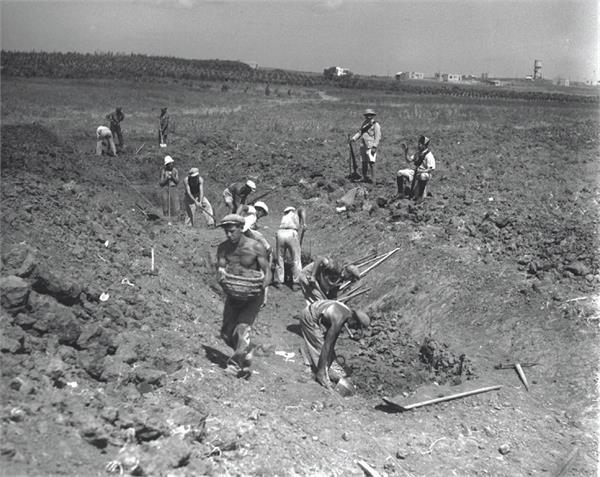
Ein HaHoresh drainage work 1936

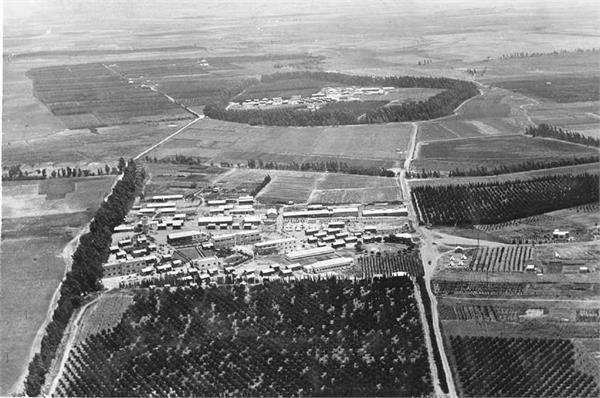
Ein Hahoresh 1939

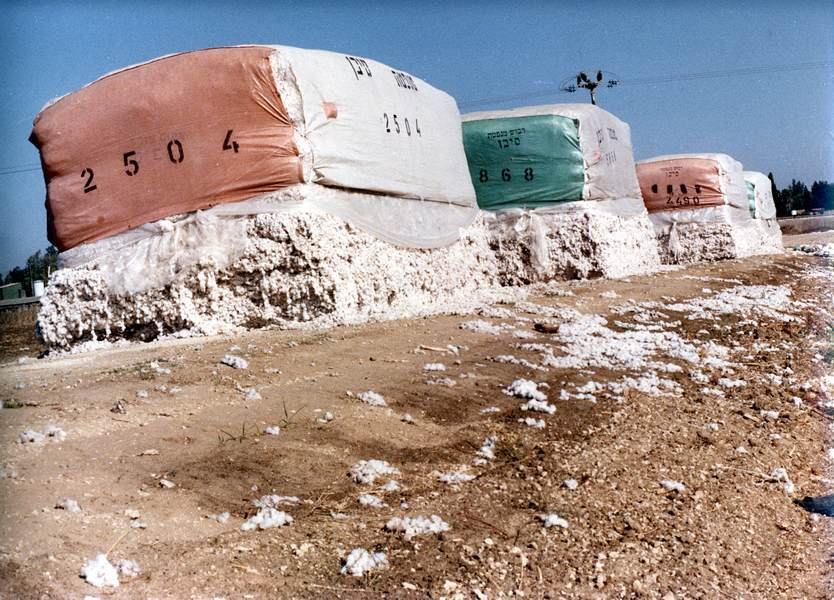
Cotton harvesting in Ein HaHoresh, 1980

== Notable people ==
- Abba Kovner (1918–1987), poet, writer, and partisan leader
- Amos Meller (1938–2007), composer and conductor
- Benny Morris (born 1948), historian
- Omer Bartov (born 1954), historian
- Sagol 59 (born Khen Rotem, 1968), rapper, songwriter and guitarist
- Jasmin Vardimon MBE (born 1971), choreographer and dancer
