= Abba Kovner =

Lithuanian-Israeli poet, writer, and partisan leader (1918–1987)

- אבא קובנר
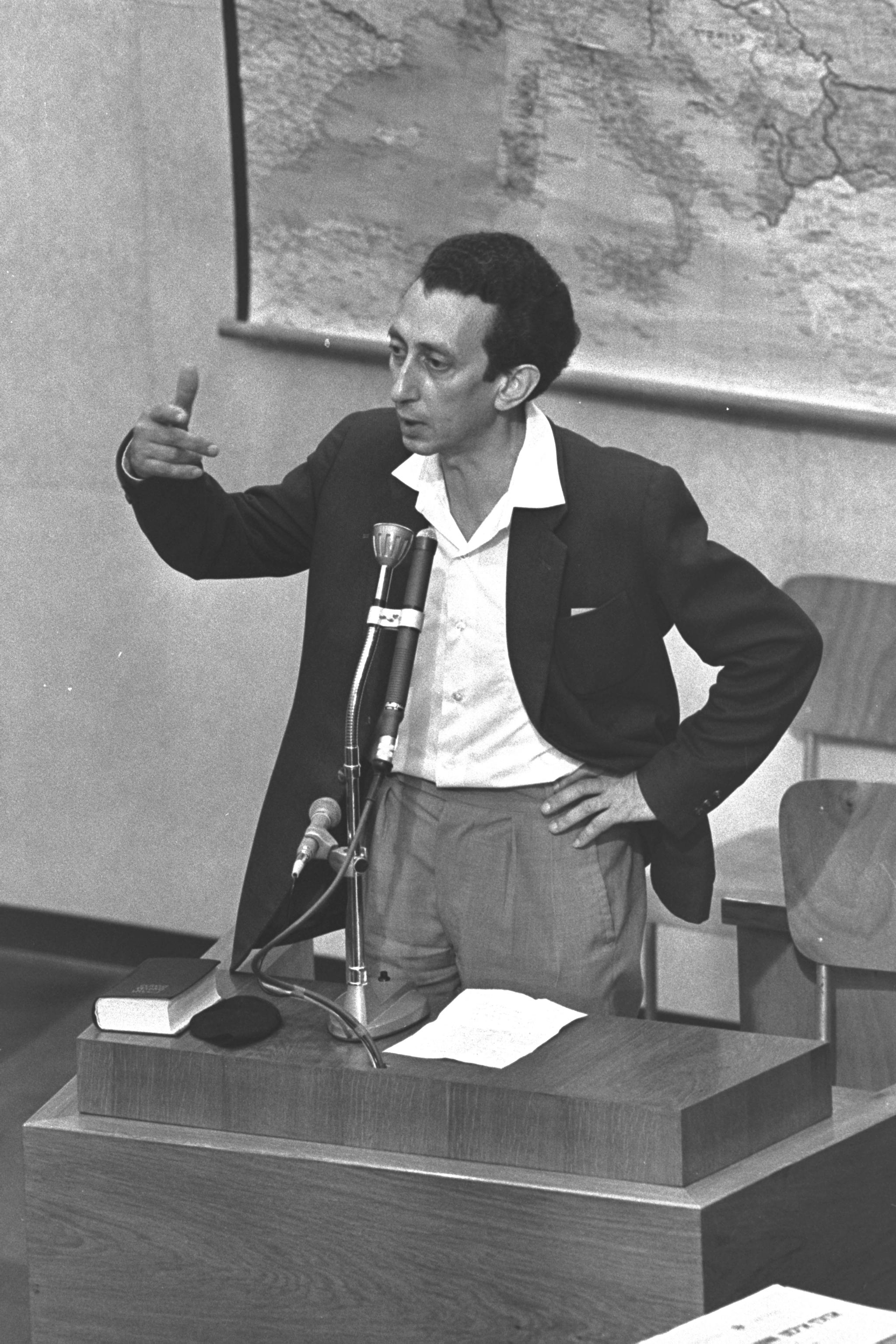
- Kovner testifies at the trial of Adolf Eichmann
- Born: 14 March 1918; Ashmyany, Lithuania District, German Empire
- Died: 25 September 1987 (aged 69); Ein HaHoresh, Israel
- Occupation: Poet
- Notable work: "Let us not go like lambs to the slaughter!"
- Political party: Mapam
- Spouse: Vitka Kempner (m. 1946)
- Children: 2
- Relatives: Meir Vilner (cousin); Esther Vilenska (cousin-in-law)

Abba Kovner (Hebrew: אבא קובנר; 14 March 1918 – 25 September 1987) was a Jewish partisan leader, and later Israeli poet and writer. In the Vilna Ghetto, his 1942 manifesto was the first time that a target of the Holocaust identified the German plan to murder all Jews. His attempt to organize a ghetto uprising failed. He fled into the forest, joined Soviet partisans, and survived the war.

After the war, Kovner led Nakam, a paramilitary organization seeking to exercise revenge for the Holocaust, but Kovner was arrested in British-occupied Germany before he could successfully carry out his plans. He immigrated to Mandatory Palestine in 1947, which became the State of Israel one year later. Kovner joined the IDF as a captain in 1948 and garnered controversy for some of his incendiary writings during the 1948 Arab–Israeli War. Considered one of the greatest authors of Modern Hebrew poetry, Kovner was awarded the Israel Prize in 1970.

== Biography ==
Abba (Abel) Kovner was born on 14 March 1918 in Ashmyany (now in Belarus). His parents were Rochel (Rosa) Taubman and Israel Kovner, whose other sons were Gedalia and Michel, the youngest of them. In 1927, the family moved to Popławska Street in Vilnius (then Poland, now Lithuania). Abba Kovner was educated at the Hebrew Tarbut Gymnasium and Stefan Batory University's Faculty of Arts. His father had a shop in Vilnius selling leather on Julian Klaczko Street. While pursuing his studies, Abba became an active member in the socialist Zionist youth movement HaShomer HaTzair. Abba Kovner was a cousin of the Israeli Communist Party leader Meir Vilner.

=== World War II ===
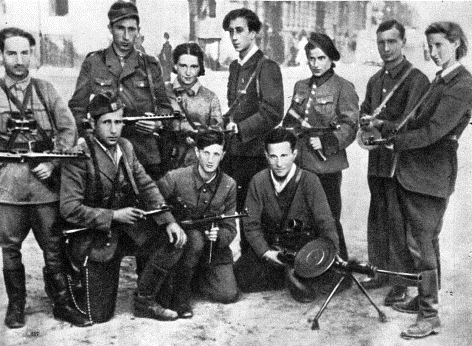
Elchanan Magid (standing, far left) and Abba Kovner (standing, center) with members of the FPO in the Vilna Ghetto. Rozka Korczak is to his left, and Vitka Kempner (his future wife) is at far right.

During the 1939 invasion of Poland, Vilnius, where Kovner lived, fell first to the Soviet Union and was then transferred to Lithuania, later in 1940 it became part of the Soviet‑occupied Lithuanian SSR, and in 1941, Nazi Germany invaded the Soviet Union and captured Vilnius from the Soviets. All Jews were ordered by the occupiers to move into the Vilna Ghetto, but Kovner managed to hide with several Jewish friends in a Dominican convent headed by Polish Catholic nun Anna Borkowska in the city's suburbs. He soon returned to the ghetto. Kovner concluded that in order for any revolt to be successful, a Jewish resistance fighting force needed to be assembled.

At the start of 1942, Kovner released a manifesto in the ghetto, titled "Let us not go like lambs to the slaughter!", although the authorship has been contested. The manifesto was the first instance in which a target of the Holocaust identified that Hitler had decided to kill all the Jews of Europe, and the first use of the phrase "like sheep to the slaughter" in a Holocaust context. Kovner informed the remaining Jews that their relatives who had been taken away had been murdered in the Ponary massacre and argued that it was best to die fighting. Nobody at that time knew for certain of more than local killings, and many received the manifesto with skepticism. For others, this proclamation represented a turning point in an understanding of the situation and how to respond to it. The idea of resistance was disseminated from Vilnius by youth movement couriers, mainly women, to the ghettos from the now occupied territories of Poland, Belarus and Lithuania.

Kovner, Yitzhak Wittenberg, Alexander Bogen and others formed the Fareynikte Partizaner Organizatsye (FPO), one of the first armed underground organizations in the Jewish ghettos under Nazi occupation. Kovner became its leader in July 1943, after Wittenberg was named by a tortured comrade and turned himself in to prevent an attack on the ghetto. The FPO planned to fight the Germans when they would come to dissolve the ghetto, but circumstances and the opposition of the ghetto leaders made this impossible and they escaped to the forests.

From September 1943 until the return of the Soviet army in July 1944, Kovner, along with his lieutenants Vitka Kempner and Rozka Korczak, commanded a partisan group called the Avengers ("Nokmim" in Hebrew) in the Rūdninkai forest near Vilnius and engaged in sabotage and guerrilla attacks against the Germans and their local collaborators. The Avengers were one of four predominantly Jewish groups that operated within the command of the Soviet-led partisans, and they did significant damage, destroying over 180 miles of train tracks, 5 bridges, 40 enemy train cars, killing 212 enemy soldiers and rescuing at least 71 Jews. A log of partisan activity recorded that 30 fighters from "Avengers" and "To Victory" partisan groups participated in the massacre of at least 38 civilians at Koniuchy in January 1944.

After the Soviet Red Army occupied Vilnius in July 1944, Kovner became one of the founders of the Berihah movement, helping Jews escape Eastern Europe after the war.

=== Nakam ===
At the end of the war, Kovner was one of the founders of the secret organization Nakam ('Revenge'), also known as Dam Yisrael Noter ('the blood of Israel avenges', with the acronym DIN meaning 'judgement'), whose purpose was to seek revenge for the Holocaust. Two plans were formulated, with the goal being to kill six million Germans. Plan A was to kill a large number of German citizens by poisoning the water supplies of Hamburg, Frankfurt, Munich, and Nuremberg. Plan B was to kill SS prisoners held in Allied POW camps. In pursuit of Plan A, members of the group were infiltrated into water and sewage plants in several cities, while Kovner went to Palestine in search of a suitable poison. Kovner discussed Nakam with Yishuv leaders, though it is not clear how much he told them, and he does not seem to have received much support. According to Kovner's own account, Chaim Weizmann approved when he pitched Plan B and put him in touch with the scientist Ernst Bergmann, who gave the job of preparing poison to Ephraim Katzir (later president of Israel) and his brother Aharon. Tom Segev initially expressed doubt over Weizmann's involvement, but in a 2025 interview he recanted his doubts, stating

"Years later, [historian] Dina Porat discovered that Kovner had received the poison from Ephraim Katzir [a leading scientist in the institute founded by and in the name of Weizmann, later Israel's president]. How narrow-minded and square I was."

The Katzir brothers confirmed that they gave poison to Kovner, but said that he only mentioned Plan B and they denied that Weizmann could be involved. As Kovner and an accomplice were returning to Europe on a British ship, they threw the poison overboard when Kovner was arrested. He was imprisoned for a few months in Cairo, and Plan A was abandoned.

In April 1946, members of Nakam broke into a bakery used to supply bread for the Langwasser internment camp near Nuremberg, where many German POWs were being held. They coated many of the loaves with arsenic but were disturbed and fled before finishing their work. More than 2,200 of the German prisoners fell ill and 207 were hospitalized, but no deaths were reported.

=== Israel ===
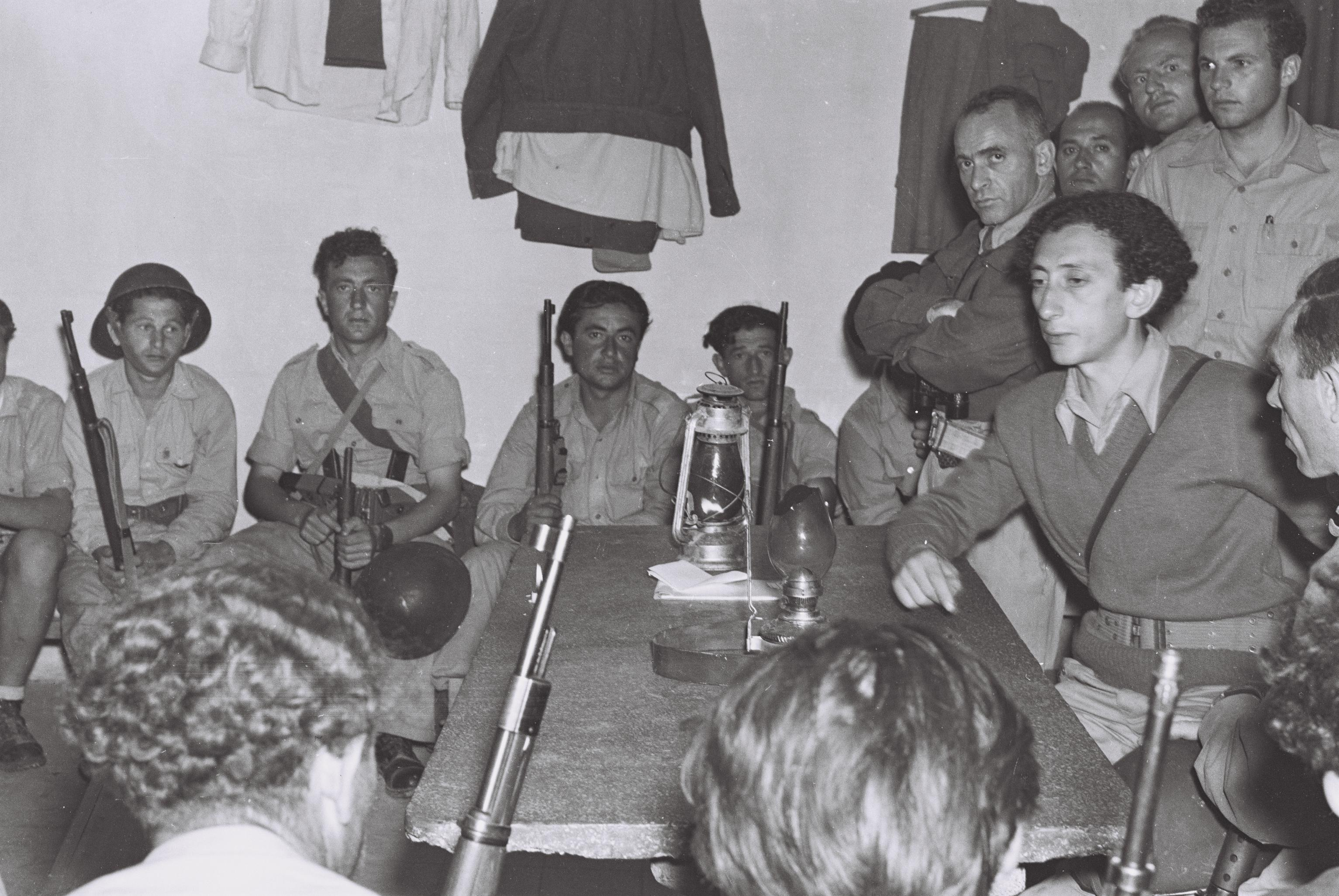
Kovner (right) briefs members of the IDF in Yad Mordechai during the 1948 Arab–Israeli War

Kovner joined the Haganah in December 1947, and soon after Israel declared independence in May 1948 he became a captain in the Givati Brigade of the IDF. During the 1948 Arab–Israeli War, he became known for his "battle pages", headed "Death to the invaders!", that contained news from the Egyptian front and essays designed to keep up morale. However, the tone of the pages, which called for revenge for the Holocaust and referred to the Egyptian enemy as vipers and dogs, upset many Israeli political and military leaders. The leader of HaShomer Hatzair, Meir Ya'ari, accused him of spreading "Fascist horror propaganda." His first battle page, entitled "Failure", started a controversy that still continues today when it accused the Nitzanim garrison of cowardice for surrendering to an overwhelming Egyptian force.

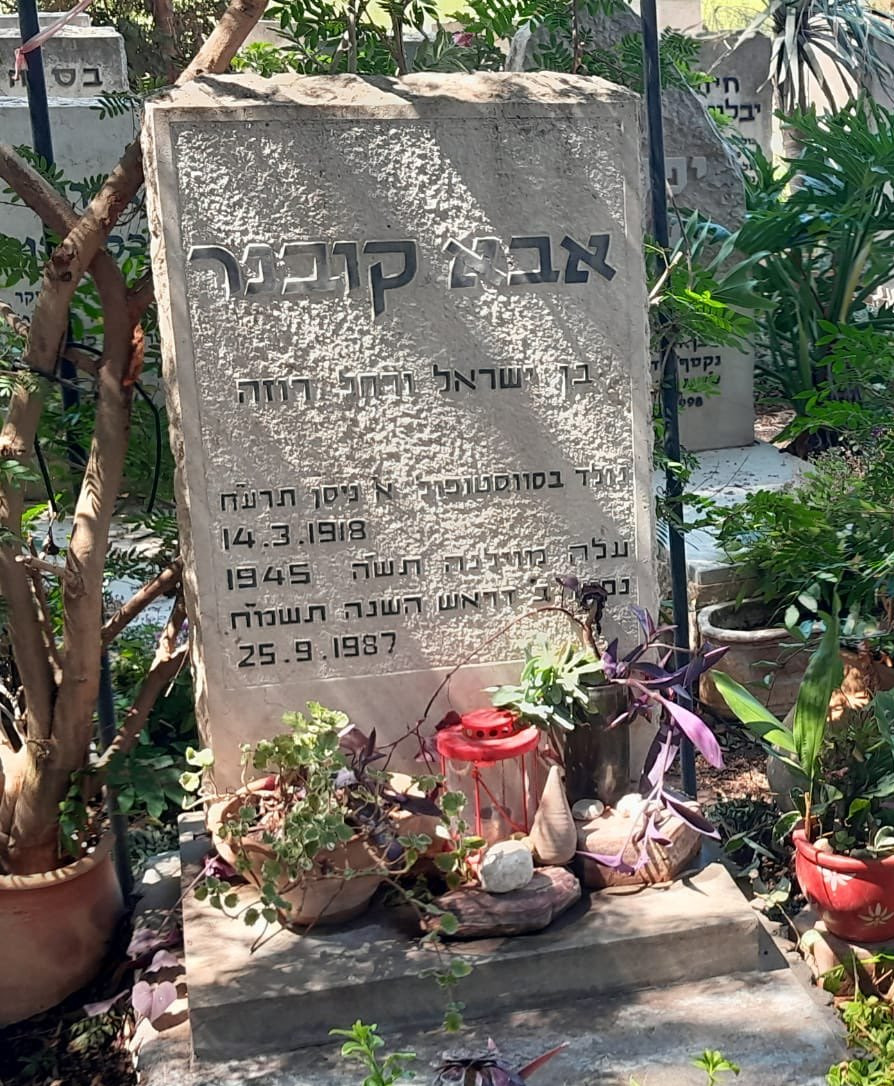
Kovner's grave in kibbutz Ein HaHoresh

From 1946 to his death, Kovner was a resident of Kibbutz Ein HaHoresh. He was active in Mapam as well as in HaShomer HaTzair, but never took on a formal political role. After the Six-Day War he joined the Editorial Board for the creation of the book "Soldiers' Talk".

He played a major part in the design and construction of several Holocaust museums, including the Diaspora Museum in Tel Aviv. He died in 1987 (aged 69) of laryngeal cancer, perhaps due to his lifelong heavy smoking, at his home in Ein HaHoresh. He was survived by his wife Vitka Kempner, who married Kovner in 1946, and their two children.

== Legacy ==
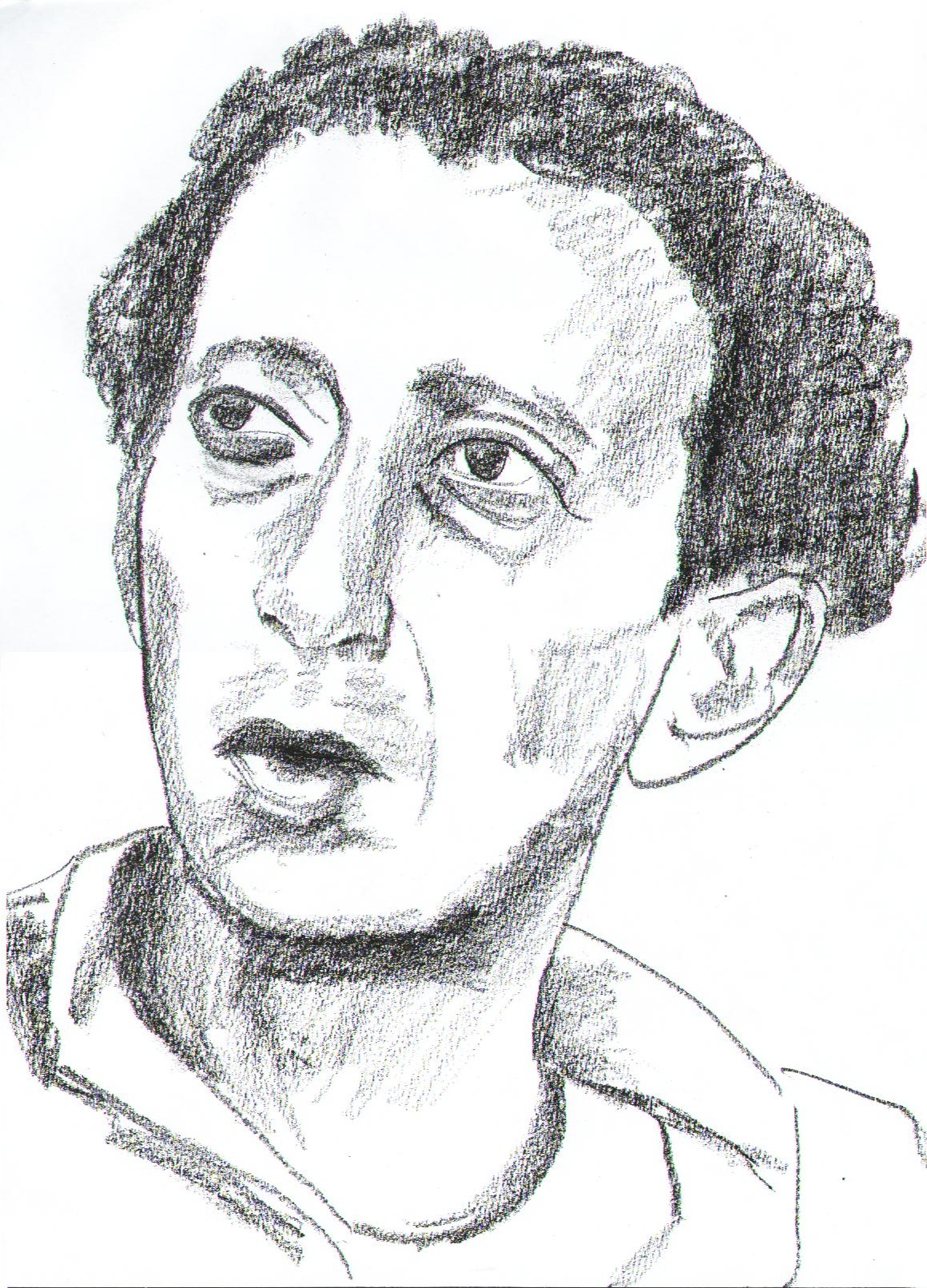
Abba Kovner drawn by Chaim Topol

Kovner's book of poetry עד-לא-אור ("Ad Lo-Or", English: Until No-Light), 1947, describes in lyric-dramatic narrative the struggle of the Resistance partisans in the swamps and forests of Eastern Europe. Ha-Mafteach Tzalal, ("The Key Drowned"), 1951, is also about this struggle. Pridah Me-ha-darom ("Departure from the South"), 1949, and Panim el Panim ("Face to Face"), 1953, continue the story with the War of Independence.

Kovner's story is the basis for the song "Six Million Germans / Nakam", by Daniel Kahn & the Painted Bird.

Kovner testified about his experiences during the war at the trial of Adolf Eichmann.

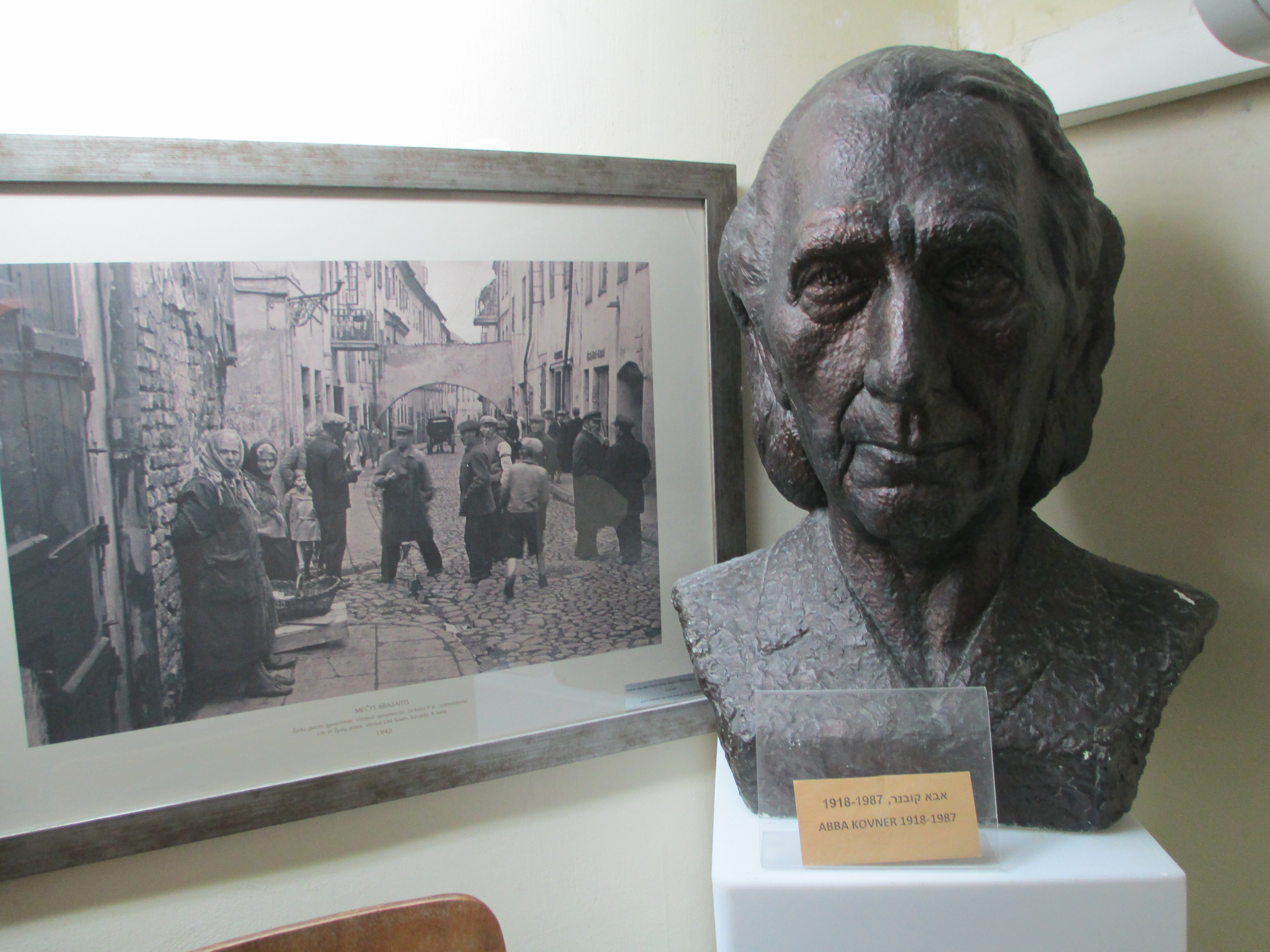
Abba Kovner sculpture in Tel Aviv

== Awards and honors ==
- In 1968, Kovner was awarded the Brenner Prize for literature.
- In 1970, Kovner was awarded the Israel Prize for literature.
- In 1986, Kovner was awarded the Prime Minister's Prize for Hebrew Literary Works.

== See also ==
- Vitka Kempner
- Anna Borkowska
- Alexander Bogen
- Bielski partisans
- List of Israel Prize recipients
- Nakam

== Bibliography ==
- Dina Porat, The Fall of a Sparrow: The Life and Times of Abba Kovner (Palo Alto, Stanford University Press, 2009). ISBN 978-0804762489.
