= Zog nit keyn mol =

Yiddish-language Jewish resistance anthem against the Holocaust

Song
- Language: Yiddish
- Written: 1943
- Songwriter: Hirsh Glick

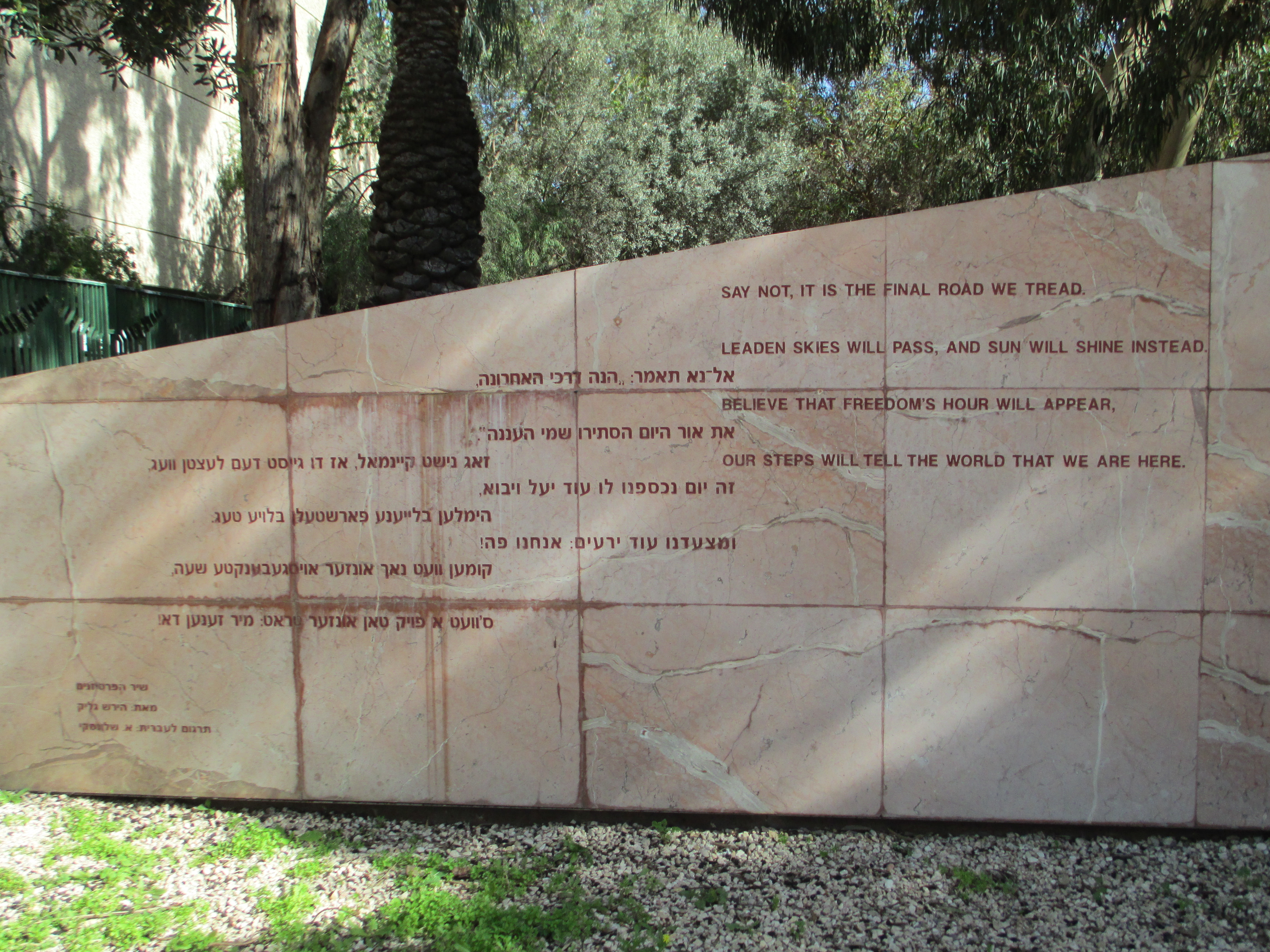
Jewish partisans' anthem in the Jewish partisans' memorial in Giv'ataym, Israel

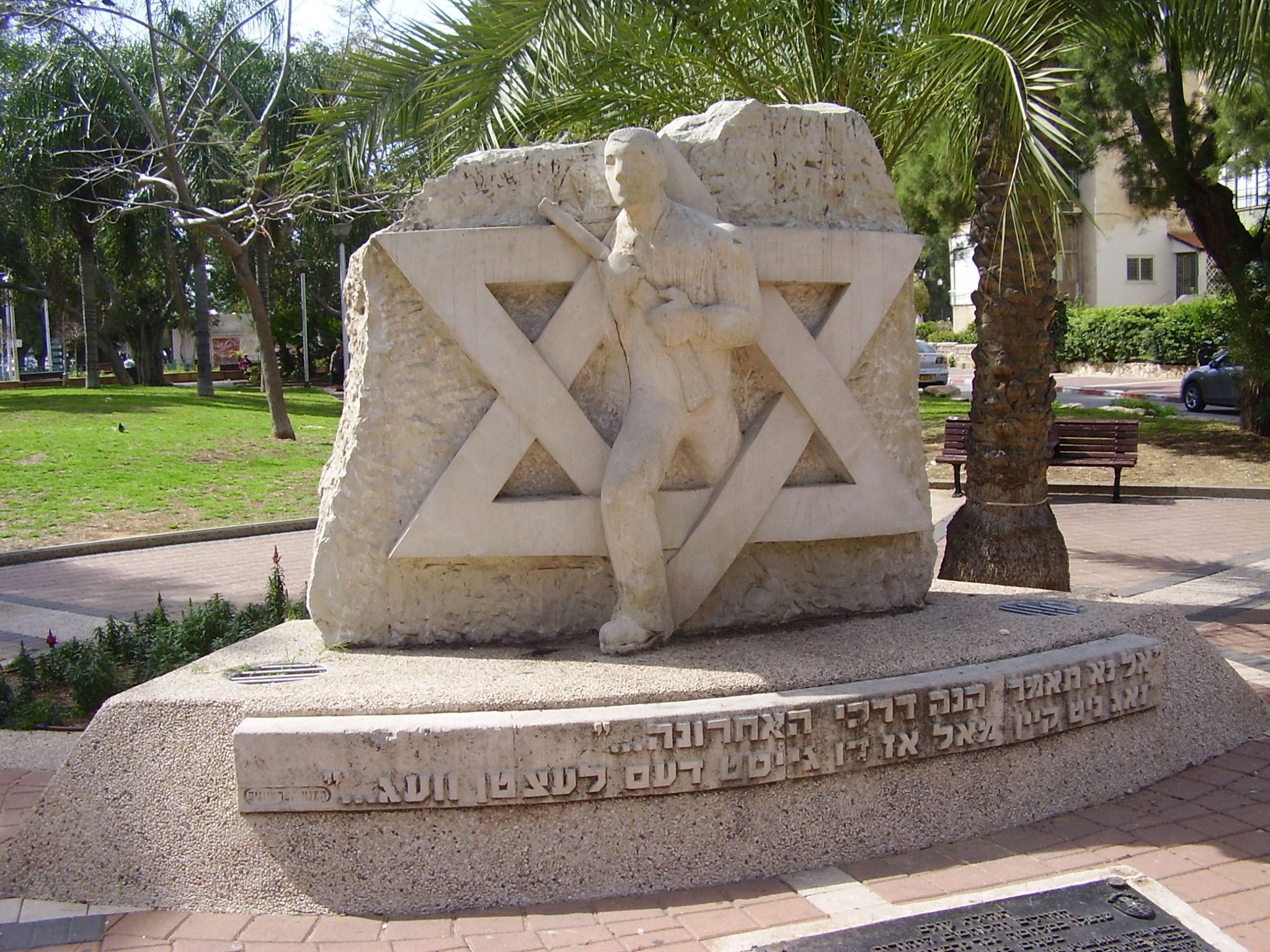
Jewish partisans' anthem in the Jewish partisans' memorial in Bat-Yam

"Zog nit keyn mol" (Never Say; Yiddish: זאָג ניט קיין מאָל, [zɔg nit kɛjn mɔl]) sometimes "Zog nit keynmol" or "Partizaner lid" [Partisan Song]) is a Yiddish song considered one of the chief anthems of Holocaust survivors and is sung in memorial services around the world.

== History ==
The lyrics of the song were written in 1943 by Hirsh Glick, a young Jewish inmate of the Vilna Ghetto, for the Vilna Jewish United Partisan Organization (FPO). The title means "Never Say" (lit. "don't say – [n]ever"), and derives from the first line of the song.

Glick's lyrics were set to music from a pre-war Soviet song written by Pokrass brothers, Dmitri and Daniil, originally "Терская походная" ("Terek Cossacks' March Song"), later renamed into "Cossacks' Song", later titled by its first line as "То не тучи - грозовые облака" (Those aren't clouds but thunderclouds), lyrics by Alexey Surkov. The original song itself has a history, typical of the Soviet times. The song was written in fall 1936 and first performed in the 1937 Soviet documentary "Sons of the Working People" about the 1936 military exercise of the Red Army. The title of the film alludes at the Red Army oath of allegiance: "I, a son of the working people, <etc...>" ("Я, сын трудового народа...") The song title refers to "6-я казачья кавалерийская Кубанско-Терская Чонгарская дивизия имени Буденного" aka the 6th Cavalry Division.

The film was released in early May, but it was soon quietly removed from the distribution, supposedly because it featured marshals Tukhachevsky and Uborevich, repressed in late May 1937 (Case of the Trotskyist Anti-Soviet Military Organization), and they began to "vanish". At the same time, the November release of a disk in which Leonid Utyosov was performing this song was removed from the distribution and replaced in December with another one, in which the film, where song originated, was not mentioned. The title "Those aren't clouds..." was used in the 1939th release of Utyosov's performance of the song. The melody of the song has nothing with traditional Cossack songs, but rather based on typical Jewish harmonies. Some find traces of Oyfn Pripetshik in it.

Glick was inspired to write the song by news of the Warsaw Ghetto Uprising. During World War II, "Zog nit keyn mol" was adopted by a number of Jewish partisan groups operating in Eastern Europe. It became a symbol of resistance against Nazi Germany's persecution of the Jews and the Holocaust.

In the Soviet Union, the song was first publicly performed in 1949 by Paul Robeson under the title "The Song of the Warsaw Ghetto", sung part in English, part in Yiddish. The melody was immediately recognized by the listeners. (Probably this was an origin of the error in some sources which claim that the song was written in Warsaw Ghetto.) While the verse was translated into Russian in the Soviet Union, the song was never performed there again, neither in Russian, nor in Yiddish.

In 2007, Australian Jewish punk band Yidcore recorded a punk rendition of the song, releasing it on their third and final full-length album They Tried to Kill Us. They Failed. Let's Eat!.

== Lyrics ==
Original Yiddish

זאָג ניט קיין מאָל, אַז דו גייסט דעם לעצטן וועג,
כאָטש הימלען בלײַענע פֿאַרשטעלן בלויע טעג.
קומען וועט נאָך אונדזער אויסגעבענקטע שעה –
ס׳וועט אַ פּויק טאָן אונדזער טראָט: מיר זײַנען דאָ!

פֿון גרינעם פּאַלמענלאַנד ביז ווײַסן לאַנד פֿון שניי,
מיר קומען אָן מיט אונדזער פּײַן, מיט אונדזער וויי,
און וווּ געפֿאַלן ס׳איז אַ שפּריץ פֿון אונדזער בלוט,
שפּראָצן וועט דאָרט אונדזער גבֿורה, אונדזער מוט!

ס׳וועט די מאָרגנזון באַגילדן אונדז דעם הײַנט,
און דער נעכטן וועט פֿאַרשווינדן מיט דעם פֿײַנט,
נאָר אויב פֿאַרזאַמען וועט די זון אין דעם קאַיאָר –
ווי אַ פּאַראָל זאָל גיין דאָס ליד פֿון דור צו דור.

דאָס ליד געשריבן איז מיט בלוט, און ניט מיט בלײַ,
ס׳איז ניט קיין לידל פֿון אַ פֿויגל אויף דער פֿרײַ,
דאָס האָט אַ פֿאָלק צווישן פֿאַלנדיקע ווענט
דאָס ליד געזונגען מיט נאַגאַנעס אין די הענט.

טאָ זאָג ניט קיין מאָל, אַז דו גייסט דעם לעצטן וועג,
כאָטש הימלען בלײַענע פֿאַרשטעלן בלויע טעג.
קומען וועט נאָך אונדזער אויסגעבענקטע שעה –
ס׳וועט אַ פּויק טאָן אונדזער טראָט: מיר זײַנען דאָ!

Transliterated Yiddish

Zog nit keyn mol, az du geyst dem letstn veg,
Khotsh himlen blayene farshteln bloye teg.
Kumen vet nokh undzer oysgebenkte sho,
S'vet a poyk ton undzer trot: mir zaynen do!

Fun grinem palmenland biz vaysn land fun shney,
Mir kumen on mit undzer payn, mit undzer vey,
Un vu gefaln s'iz a shprits fun undzer blut,
Shprotsn vet dort undzer gvure, undzer mut!

S'vet di morgnzun bagildn undz dem haynt,
Un der nekhtn vet farshvindn mit dem faynt,
Nor oyb farzamen vet di zun in dem kayor –
Vi a parol zol geyn dos lid fun dor tsu dor.

Dos lid geshribn iz mit blut, un nit mit blay,
S'iz nit keyn lidl fun a foygl oyf der fray,
Dos hot a folk tsvishn falndike vent
Dos lid gezungen mit naganes in di hent.

To zog nit keyn mol, az du geyst dem letstn veg,
Khotsh himlen blayene farshteln bloye teg.
Kumen vet nokh undzer oysgebenkte sho –
S'vet a poyk ton undzer trot: mir zaynen do!

English translation

Never say that you're going your last way
Although the skies filled with lead cover blue days
Our promised hour will soon come
Our marching steps ring out: 'We are here!'

From green lands of palm to lands with white snow
We come with our pain and our woes
And from where a spurt of our blood falls
Will sprout our strength and our courage

Today the morning sun will accompany us
And the night will fade away with the enemy
But if the sun waits to rise
Like a password this song will go from generation to generation

This song is written with blood and not with [pencil] lead
It's not a tune sung by birds in the wild
This song was sung by people amidst collapsing walls
Sung with pistols in their hands

So never say that you're going your last way
Although the skies filled with lead cover blue days
Our promised hour will soon come
Our marching steps ring out: 'We are here'!

Hebrew Translation

אַל נָא תֹּאמַר: "הִנֵּה דַּרְכִּי הָאַחֲרוֹנָה,
אֶת אוֹר הַיּוֹם הִסְתִּירוּ שְׁמֵי הָעֲנָנָה!"
זֶה יוֹם נִכְסַפְנוּ לוֹ עוֹד יַעַל וְיָבוֹא
וּמִצְעָדֵנוּ עוֹד יַרְעִים: אֲנַחְנוּ פֹּה!

מֵאֶרֶץ הַתָּמָר עַד יַרְכְּתֵי כְּפוֹרִים
אֲנַחְנוּ פֹּה בְּמַכְאוֹבוֹת וְיִסּוּרִים
וּבַאֲשֶׁר טִפַּת דָּמֵנוּ שָׁם נִגְּרָה
הֲלֹא יָנוּב עוֹד עֹז רוּחֵנוּ בִּגְבוּרָה.

עַמּוּד הַשַּׁחַר עַל יוֹמֵנוּ אוֹר יָהֵל.
עִם הַצּוֹרֵר יַחֲלֹף תְּמוֹלֵנוּ כְּמוֹ צֵל.
אַךְ אִם חָלִילָה יְאַחֵר לָבוֹא הָאוֹר
כְּמוֹ סִיסְמָה יְהֵא הַשִּׁיר מִדּוֹר לְדוֹר.

בִּכְתַב הַדָּם וְהָעוֹפֶרֶת הוּא נִכְתַּב;
הוּא לֹא שִׁירַת צִפּוֹר הַדְּרוֹר וְהַמֶּרְחָב,
כִּי בֵּין קִירוֹת נוֹפְלִים שָׁרוּהוּ כָּל הָעָם,
יַחְדָּיו שָׁרוּהוּ וְנאַגאַנִים בְּיָדָם.

עַל כֵּן אַל נָא תֹּאמַר: דַּרְכִּי הָאַחֲרוֹנָה
אֶת אוֹר הַיּוֹם הִסְתִּירוּ שְׁמֵי הָעֲנָנָה.
זֶה יוֹם נִכְסַפְנוּ לוֹ עוֹד יַעַל וְיָבוֹא,
וּמִצְעָדֵנוּ עוֹד יַרְעִים: אֲנַחְנוּ פֹּה!

Translation:

== See also ==
- Bella ciao – Italian partisan song
- Bandiera Rossa – Italian revolutionary song
- Fischia il vento – song associated with the Italian partisans
- Siamo i ribelli della montagna – Italian partisan song
