= Like sheep to the slaughter =

Proverb regarding passivity

"Like sheep to the slaughter" — and its numerous variants, such as "like a lamb to the slaughter" — is a simile that refers to facing a negative situation clueless of its consequences. It is a popular simile, and has been used in various contexts throughout history.

In the modern era, one highly significant use of the phrase "like sheep to the slaughter" (Hebrew: כצאן לטבח, romanized: katzon litbach) is as a phrase that refers to the idea that Jews went passively to their deaths during the Holocaust. It derives from a similar phrase in the Hebrew Bible that favorably depicts martyrdom in both the Jewish and Christian religious traditions. Opposition to the phrase became associated with Jewish nationalism due to its use in Josippon and by Jewish self-defense groups after the 1903 Kishinev pogrom. During the Holocaust, Abba Kovner and other Jewish resistance leaders used the phrase to exhort Jews to fight back. In postwar Israel, some demonized Holocaust survivors as having gone "like sheep to the slaughter" while armed resistance was glorified. The phrase was taken to mean that Jews had not tried to save their own lives, and consequently were partly responsible for their own suffering and death. This myth, which has become less prominent over time, is frequently criticized by historians, theologians, and survivors as a form of victim blaming.

== Background ==
=== Religious ===
Judaism

In Isaiah 53, a chapter in the Hebrew Bible, a virtuous servant is murdered but does not protest: "Like a sheep being led to the slaughter or a lamb that is silent before her shearers, he did not open his mouth" (Isaiah 53:7). His silence is praised because there was no "deceit in his mouth" (Isaiah 53:9). But Rabbi Abraham Heschel pointed out that the context is more ambiguous, because Isaiah himself protests God's punishment of the Jewish people. In Psalm 44, the martyrdom of Jewish people persecuted for their religion is presented favorably: "Nay, but for Thy sake are we killed all the day; / We are accounted as sheep to be slaughtered" (Psalms 44:22). Jewish liturgy uses the phrase in Tachanun, a prayer derived from Psalm 44, which is traditionally recited each Monday and Thursday in the Shacharis (morning prayers):

Look from heaven and perceive that we have become an object of scorn and derision among the nations; we are regarded as the sheep led to slaughter, to be killed, destroyed, beaten, and humiliated. But despite all this we have not forgotten Your Name—we beg You not to forget us.

The Hebrew phrase in the Bible, "like sheep to be slaughtered" (כְּצֹאן טִבְחָה, ke-tson le-tivhah), is distinct from the later variant "like sheep to (the) slaughter" (כצאן לטבח, ke-tson la-tevah).

Christianity

In Christianity, the phrase was interpreted as the virtue of meekness, related to Jesus allowing himself to be crucified; Jesus was symbolized as the Lamb of God. Presbyterian theologian Albert Barnes wrote, "the fact that [Jesus] did not open his mouth in complaint was therefore the more remarkable, and made the merit of his sufferings the greater". He considered Isaiah 53 prophetic typology that had been "fulfilled in the life of the Lord Jesus", a typology that would continue as part of Christian interpretations of the Holocaust.

=== Secular ===
The inverse of the phrase, contrary to what was previously believed, was coined by the writer of the 10th-century Jewish history Josippon, which quoted Mattathias, a leader of the Maccabean Revolt, as saying, "Be strong and let us be strengthened and let us die fighting and not die as sheep led to slaughter". In a different context, the phrase was used by United States founder George Washington in 1783 to warn of the dangers of removing the right to freedom of speech: "the freedom of speech may be taken away, and dumb and silent we may be led, like sheep, to the Slaughter".

The inversion of the phrase was revived by Jewish self-defense leagues in the Russian Empire in the wake of the 1903 Kishinev pogrom, although it remained rare compared to other imagery of victimization. In reference to the pogrom, The New York Times reported that "The Jews were taken wholly unaware and slaughtered like sheep". Yosef Haim Brenner's Hebrew novella Around the Point featured a protagonist who asked, "Were the Jews like sheep to be slaughtered?" but immediately rejected the idea. By 1910, the second version of the phrase, invented in Josippon, was more commonly used. In a 1920 article titled "Will They Make Jerusalem into a Kishinev?" Zalman Shazar, later the third president of Israel, argued against negotiating with the British Mandatory Palestine authorities because "The brothers of the Tel Hai heroes will not be led as sheep to slaughter."

In Yizkor, a 1911 book memorializing Jews killed by Arabs, the inverse was attributed to Ya'akov Plotkin, the leader of a Jewish self-defense organization in Ukraine, who had immigrated to Palestine and was killed during the intercommunal conflict in Palestine. According to Yitzhak Ben-Zvi, later Israel's second president, Plotkin had previously used the phrase in regard to defense against the pogroms in the Russian Empire. The book was widely read by Zionists in Eastern Europe. Yael Feldman suggests that this is the probable source for the verbiage Abba Kovner used in his declaration of 1 January 1942.

== In the Holocaust context ==
=== During the Holocaust ===
During the Holocaust, Abba Kovner was the first to use the phrase as a call for action in a 1 January 1942 pamphlet in which he argued that "Hitler is plotting the annihilation of European Jewry". Kovner urged Jews in the Vilna Ghetto to resist the Germans:

We will not be led like sheep to slaughter. True we are weak and helpless, but the only response to the murders is revolt. Brethren, it is better to die fighting like free men than to live at the mercy of the murderers. Arise, Arise with last breath.

— Abba Kovner, Let us not go like lambs to the slaughter!

Instead of viewing Jews as sheep, Kovner instead attempted "to cause a rebellion against the very use of that term", according to Holocaust historian Yehuda Bauer. In a speech Kovner gave to members of the Palmach after arriving in Palestine in October 1945, he explained that his phrase had not meant that Holocaust victims had gone "like sheep to the slaughter" and attributed that interpretation to non-Jews, such as a Soviet partisan commissar. Kovner also said of the inability of so many victims to fight back, "All and everyone did go like this!", including Soviet prisoners of war, Nazi collaborators killed by their former allies, and Polish officers.

The pamphlet was smuggled to other ghettos, where it inspired similar calls for resistance. In the Kraków Ghetto, Dolek Liebeskind said, "For three lines in history that will be written about the youth who fought and did not go like sheep to the slaughter it is even worth dying." During the Grossaktion Warsaw, the mass deportation of Jews from the Warsaw Ghetto beginning 22 July 1942, Jewish archivist Emanuel Ringelblum criticized the brutality of the Jewish Ghetto Police during roundups and the Jewish masses' passivity. Ringelblum asked, "why have we allowed ourselves to be led like sheep to the slaughter", and concluded that Jews were ashamed and disgraced because their "docility" did not save their lives. He concluded that the only option was armed resistance, even as a symbolic gesture.

=== After the war ===
==== In Israel ====
In the immediate postwar period in Israel, before the Eichmann trial, survivors who had not fought with the partisans were stigmatized for having allegedly gone like sheep to the slaughter. In response, some child survivors pretended to be sabras (native Israelis), and other survivors never mentioned their experience. Armed resistance was glorified, partly because the establishment of the State of Israel also required armed conflict. For example, the most popular textbook for elementary school students devoted 60% of its Holocaust coverage to the Warsaw Ghetto Uprising. In contrast, other reactions to the Holocaust were demonized: one textbook approved by the Ministry of Education read that "the heroic stand of the Ghetto Jews also compensated for the humiliating surrender of those led to the death camps" and that Holocaust victims had gone "as sheep to the slaughter".

British historian Tom Lawson argues that the idea of Jewish passivity during the Holocaust confirmed stereotypes of diaspora Jews held by the Yishuv, the Jewish community in Palestine, which contributed to their ascendance. Israeli historian Yechiam Weitz argues that the "sheep to slaughter" trope "insinuat[es] that millions of Jews who perished in the Holocaust did not measure up" and, if they had fought back, Jewish national honor would have been preserved. Israeli historian Idit Zertal writes that Holocaust survivors were blamed for not choosing Zionism in time.

Israeli historian Hanna Yablonka criticizes this perception, arguing that Holocaust survivors shaped Israeli memory. Feldman describes the myth as deriving from traditional European antisemitic stereotypes of Jews as "the dishonorable antithesis of all the 'virile' qualities deemed necessary by modern nationalism". An alternate explanation advanced by Israeli historian Tom Segev is that the sheep metaphor enabled Israelis to downplay the suffering of Jews during the Holocaust as a defense mechanism against cultural trauma. Initially, little was known about the Holocaust, leading to over-generalization. According to the just-world falllacy, Holocaust victims and survivors must have done something to deserve their fate.

Kovner's speech of October 1945 was not available to the public for four decades, and many falsely attributed the accusation against Israeli Holocaust survivors to him. Disturbed by this, Kovner said in 1947 that one who had not witnessed the events of the Holocaust could not use the phrase appropriately; "like sheep to the slaughter" meant something different in Israel than it had in the Vilna Ghetto in 1942. Meanwhile, he continued to claim authorship of the inversion of the statement despite the previous precedent.

The Israeli attitude toward Holocaust survivors was revolutionized by the highly publicized trial of Adolf Eichmann, a key Holocaust perpetrator, in Jerusalem. During the trial, prosecutor Gideon Hausner went beyond proving Eichmann's guilt. He attempted to educate Israelis about Nazi crimes, "assumed the role of defense attorney for the dead and the living Jewish people", and called many survivors as witnesses. The public questioned whether resistance was an option for the masses, and the activity of rescue groups such as the Aid and Rescue Committee was viewed more favorably. Public opinion shifted to blaming the perpetrators exclusively. Revisionist Zionist poet Uri Zvi Greenberg said, "It is a crime to say that, in the time of Hitler, Diaspora Jewry could have gone to their deaths differently." The Labor Zionist writer Haim Guri wrote:

We should ask forgiveness from countless numbers for having judged them in our hearts... We often generalized categorically and arbitrarily that these poor souls [went to their deaths] "as sheep to the slaughter." Now we know better.

==== Outside of Israel ====
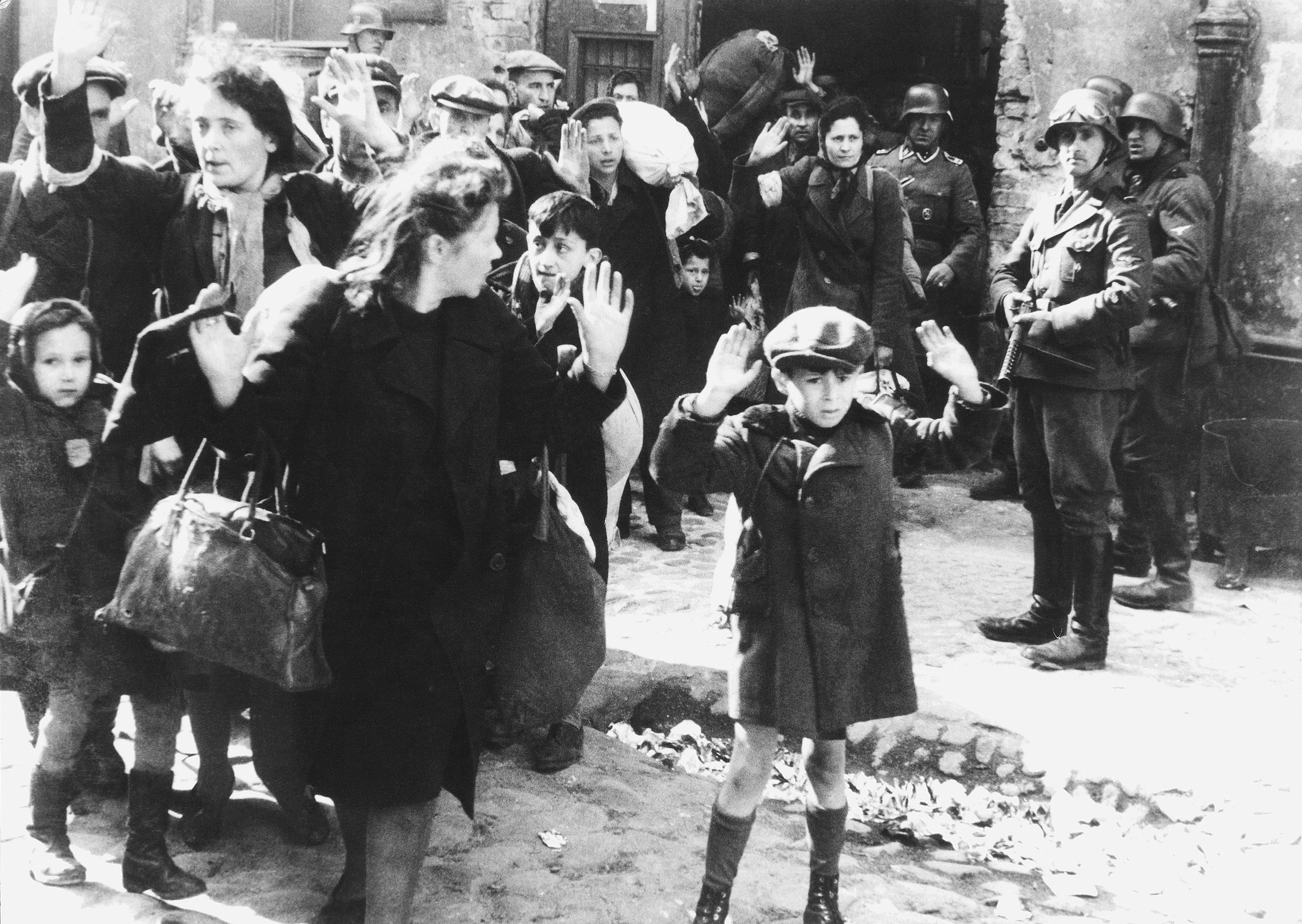
The Warsaw Ghetto boy

After the war, the idea that Jewish Holocaust victims and survivors had been passive was reinforced by photographs of liberated Nazi concentration camps depicting emaciated survivors. Because Nazi propaganda films were often the only source of footage, their use in postwar documentaries supported the idea of Jewish passivity, as did the iconic Warsaw Ghetto boy photograph. The claim that Jewish concentration camp prisoners were more passive than non-Jewish prisoners often obscured historical fact, such as the fact that Jews launched six of the seven uprisings in concentration or death camps.

In 1946, survivor and psychologist Viktor Frankl wrote the bestselling book Man's Search for Meaning, based on his own experiences, in which he claimed that a positive attitude was essential to surviving the camps. Consequently, he implied that those who died had given up. Historians have concluded that there was little connection between attitude and survival. In 1960, Jewish psychoanalyst Bruno Bettelheim claimed that "Like lemmings, [millions] marched themselves to their own death" and that Anne Frank and her family were partly to blame for not owning firearms. In his 1961 book The Destruction of the European Jews, historian Raul Hilberg characterized Jewish resistance as an extremely marginal phenomenon. However, he evaluated the resistance solely by the number of Germans killed. Instead, he argued that Jews had "speeded the process of destruction" by obedience to German orders conditioned by the passivity of Jewish diaspora culture. In the 1985 edition, Hilberg quoted Ringelblum to support this argument.

Hannah Arendt explicitly rejected the idea that Jewish victims had gone "like sheep to the slaughter", because all victims of Nazi persecution had behaved similarly. She argued that Bettelheim expected that Jews would somehow divine Nazi intentions better than other victims and privately criticized Hilberg for "babbl[ing] about a 'death wish' of the Jews". Although she criticized Israeli prosecutor Gideon Hausner for asking survivors why they had not resisted, she also described Jews as obeying Nazi orders with "submissive meekness" and "arriving on time at the transportation points, walking under their own power to the places of execution, digging their own graves, undressing and making neat piles of their clothing, and lying down side by side to be shot", a characterization American Holocaust scholar Deborah Lipstadt found "disturbing". Arendt blamed the Judenrat for collaborating with the Nazis, an assessment not commonly accepted today. Despite her more nuanced portrayal, her arguments in Eichmann in Jerusalem were equated with those of Hilberg and Bettelheim and harshly criticized.

After the first three decades, the trope became less of a driving force in Holocaust historiography, according to Lawson. But Richard Middleton-Kaplan cites the 2010 film The Debt, about a Nazi war criminal who taunts and escapes from his Jewish captors, as a recent example of a work perpetuating the perception that Jews passively acquiesced to their fate, because the Nazi's claims to that effect are not rebutted. Israeli settlers protesting evacuation from the Gaza Strip said "we will not go as sheep to slaughter", which was considered hyperbole.

== Criticism ==
The phrase became so widespread and widely believed that historians of Jewish resistance during the Holocaust used it as the title of works challenging perceptions of Jewish passivitity. Daniel Goldhagen criticized the "maddening, oft-heard phrase 'like sheep to slaughter'" as a "misconception" in his blurb for the 1994 book Resistance: The Warsaw Ghetto Uprising. The entry on Jewish resistance in Eastern Europe in the 2001 The Holocaust Encyclopedia opens by debunking the "false assumptions" behind questions such as "Why did the Jews go like sheep to the slaughter?"

Yehuda Bauer has argued that "those who use it are identifying, even unconsciously, with the killers", who denied their victims' humanity. He notes that "Jews were not sheep. Jews were Jews, Jews were human beings" who were murdered, not slaughtered. American sociologist Nechama Tec says she is frequently asked "Why did Jews go like sheep to the slaughter?", which she calls "a blatantly false assumption" because the opportunity to resist was not often present, and many Jews employed creative survival strategies. Tec strongly criticizes the idea that "the victims themselves were partly to blame for their own destruction". According to Holocaust historian Peter Hayes, "nothing in the literature on the Shoah is more unseemly than the blame cast by some writers on an almost completely unarmed, isolated, terrified, tortured, and enervated people for allegedly failing to respond adequately".

Survivors including Elie Wiesel and Primo Levi have also criticized the tendency to blame Jews for their plight during the Holocaust, which Wiesel called "The height of irony and cruelty: the dead victims needed to be defended, while the killers, dead and alive, were left alone." Psychologist Eva Fogelman argues that the victim-blaming tendency stems from the desire to "avoid confronting the question: What would I have done? And would I have survived?" According to Fogelman, "Blaming the victims not only distorts history; it also perpetuates their victimization."

Rabbi Emil Fackenheim wrote that "the loose talk about 'sheep to slaughter' and 'collaborationist' Judenräte" is caused by willful ignorance of the facts of the Holocaust because "it is more comfortable to blame the victim". Rabbi Yisrael Rutman argued that the "true meaning" of the phrase is the spiritual strength of Jews who had no opportunity to resist their murder. Rabbi Bernard Rosenberg writes that to understand the fallacy of the "sheep to the slaughter" myth, one must consider the lived experience of survivors who had no opportunity to fight back against their oppressors. Rosenberg argues that survival and the effort to rebuild lives, communities, and the Jewish state after the Holocaust was a form of fighting back, as is preserving Jewish tradition today. Orthodox Rabbi and author Shmuley Boteach calls the phrase a "double insult to the martyred six million" because it both accuses them of cowardice and blames them for their fate.

== See also ==
- The Sheep and the Goats – Parable by Jesus in Matthew 25
