= Yitzhak Wittenberg =

Jewish resistance fighter (1907–1943)

Yitz Wittenberg

Yitzhak Wittenberg (Yiddish: איציק װיטנבערג, Hebrew: יצחק ויטנברג; 1907 – 16 July 1943) was a Jewish resistance fighter in Nazi-occupied Vilnius, Lithuania, during World War II. He was a member of the Communist Party. He was the commander of the Fareynikte Partizaner Organizatsye (FPO), a resistance group in the Vilna Ghetto which was preparing an uprising should the final moments of the ghetto come. When the Germans learned about the existence of a Communist, Wittenberg, in the ghetto, they made a request to the head of the Jewish council, Jacob Gens, that Wittenberg should be surrendered to them. Gens betrayed Wittenberg to the police who arrested him, but he was freed by young FPO fighters. Subsequently, Gens insisted that Wittenberg surrender. Feeling he did not have the support of the ghetto for an uprising and fearing a massacre, he surrendered.

Some accounts say that he was later found dead in his prison cell having swallowed poison; others say that his mutilated body was found the next day. It has been speculated that Gens slipped the poison to Wittenberg. Testimony regarding the Wittenberg affair was given in the Eichmann trial by Abba Kovner, one of Wittenberg's compatriots in the FPO. The story of his death is told in the song Yitzhak Wittenberg.
