= Hirsh Glick =

Lithuanian poet and partisan

- Born: 1922; Wilno, Second Polish Republic
- Died: 1944 (aged 21–22); Estonia
- Occupations: poet, partisan
- Writing career
- Language: Yiddish
- Notable work: Zog nit keyn mol

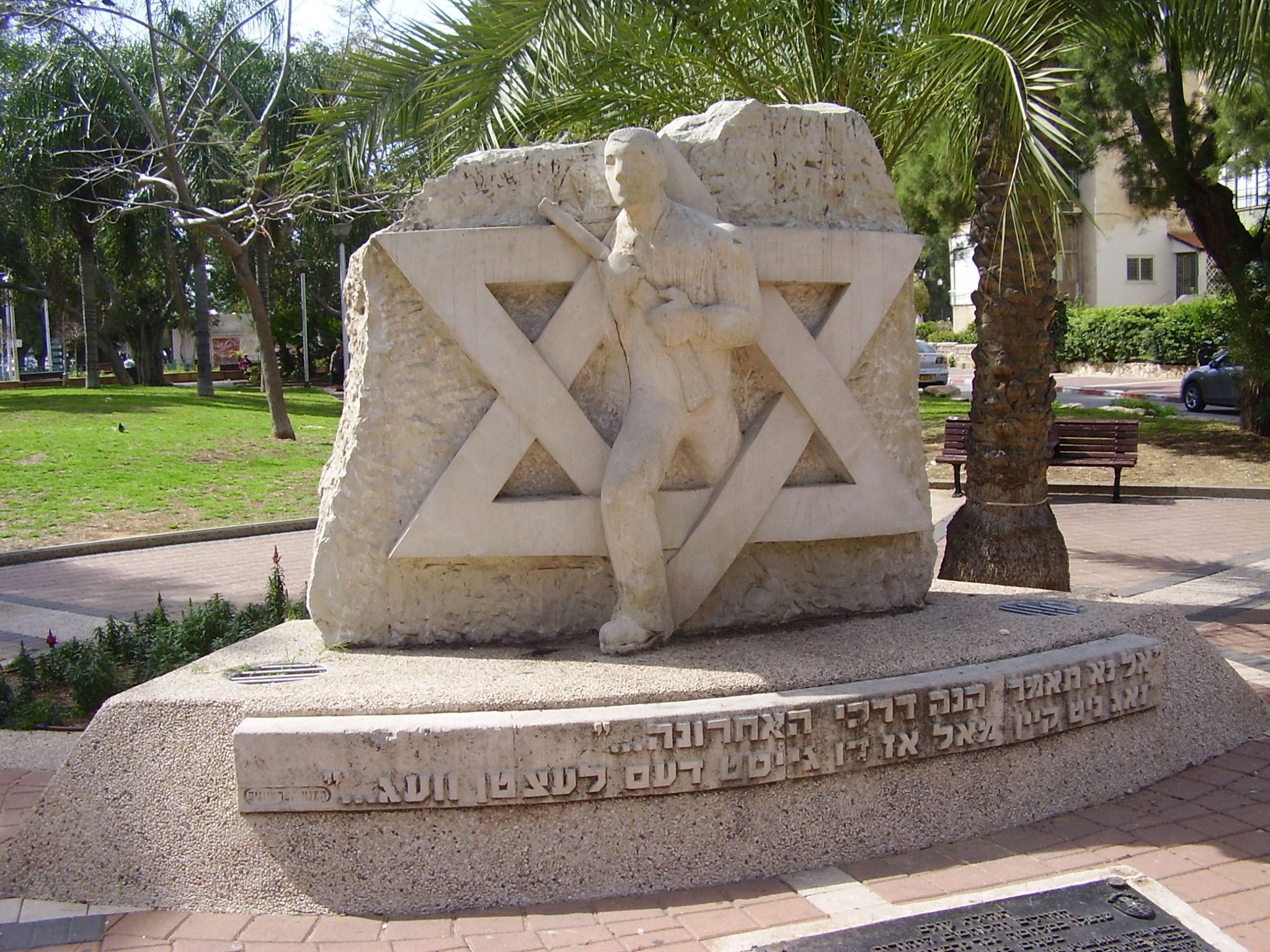
Jewish Partisans Memorial in Bat Yam, Israel, featuring a poem by Glick

Hirsh Glick (1922 – 1944) was a Jewish poet and partisan.

== Life ==
Glick was born in Wilno in 1922 (at the time a part of interwar Poland). He began to write Yiddish poetry in his teens and became co-founder of Yungvald (Young Forest), a group of young Jewish poets. After the German assault on the Soviet Union in 1941, Hirsh Glick was imprisoned in the Weiße Wache concentration camp and later transferred to the Vilna Ghetto. Glick involved himself in the ghetto's artistic community while simultaneously participating in the underground and took part in the 1942 ghetto uprising. In 1943 he wrote his most famous work, the song Zog nit keynmol, az du geyst dem letstn veg (זאג ניט קיינמאל, אז דו גייסט דעם לעצטן וועג) to the music of Dmitry Pokrass (1899-1978), which became the anthem of the Jewish partisan movement, and Shtil, di nakht iz oysgeshternt. He was inspired to write this work by news that arrived of the Warsaw Ghetto Uprising.

Glick managed to flee when the Vilna Ghetto was being liquidated in October 1943, but got captured. Later he was deported to a concentration camp in Estonia. During his captivity he continued to compose songs and poems. In July 1944, with the Soviet Army approaching, Glick escaped. He was never heard from again, and was presumed captured and executed by the Nazis (reportedly in August 1944).

== Sources ==
- Gutman, Israel, ed. Encyclopedia of the Holocaust. MacMillan Reference Books, 1995.
