= Fareynikte Partizaner Organizatsye =

Jewish resistance organisation in Vilna Ghetto during World War II

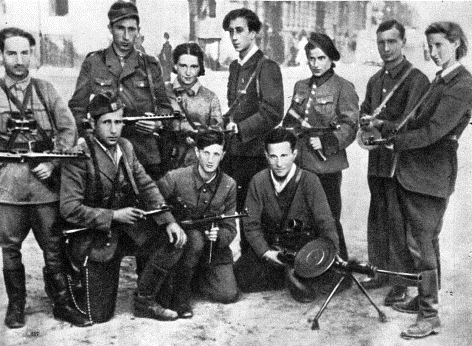
Abba Kovner (back row, centre) with members of the FPO in Vilna

The Fareynikte Partizaner Organizatsye (Yiddish: פֿאַראײניקטע פּאַרטיזאַנער אָרגאַניזאַציע; "United Partisan Organization"; referred to as FPO by its Yiddish initials) was a Jewish resistance organization based in the Vilna Ghetto in German-occupied Lithuania and founded on 21 January 1942. The clandestine organisation was established by Communists as well as left- and right-wing Zionists. Their leaders were the communist Yitzhak Wittenberg, socialist Abba Kovner, and revisionist Betar member Josef Glazman.

== Background ==
After the creation of the ghetto in Vilnius, Jewish youth organizations were mainly involved in rescuing Jews during the extermination operations. There were disagreements between the various organizations regarding the goals of their activities and methods of work. The main proposals were to continue operating in Vilnius, to transfer their activities to the ghettos of Białystok or Warsaw, where the possibility of an uprising seemed more realistic (and where they did take place in August 1943 and April–May 1943, respectively), or to go into the forests as partisans. In the end, most of the organizations, with the exception of Mordechai Tenenbaum's Ha-Halutz-Dror group, decided to continue operating in Vilnius.

On 31 December 1941, Abba Kovner's appeal "We will not go like sheep to the slaughter" was published, calling for armed resistance to the Nazis.

On 21 January 1942, the FPO was created. Representatives of Jewish youth organizations – Yitzhak Wittenberg from the communists, Abba Kovner from Hashomer Hatzair (Socialist Zionism), Nissan Reznik from the Zionist youth and Josef Glazman from Betar (right-wing Revisionist Zionism) - gathered in the ghetto and decided to create a united organization. Yitzhak Wittenberg was elected its commander, Kovner, Resnick, and Glazman as members of the staff. In the spring of 1942, the Bundists also joined the FPO. Representatives of Ha-Halutz-Dror created a separate organization under the leadership of Yechiel Sheinbaum. It advocated fleeing to the forests rather than revolt, but it united with the FPO in spring 1943 when the end of the ghetto's continued existence was in plain sight.

== Establishment of the FPO ==
The FPO was formed in the Vilna Ghetto on 21 January 1942, three weeks after Kovner's manifesto, at Rūdninkų (Rudnicka) street no. 6, which was the office building of the Judenrat. This was the first Jewish resistance organization established in the ghettos of Nazi-occupied Europe in World War II, followed by Łachwa underground in August 1942. Unlike in other ghettos – where the underground resistance was coordinated to some extent with the officials of the local Jewish establishment – Vilna's Jacob Gens, head of the ghetto, cooperated with German officials in stopping armed resistance.

The goals of the FPO were to establish self-defense in the ghetto, to sabotage German industrial and military activities and to join the partisan and Red Army's fight against the Nazis. Abba Kovner, the movement's leader, and 17 members of the local Zionist group Hashomer Hatzair, stationed at a Polish Catholic convent for an order of Dominican Sisters, sheltered from the Nazis by Mother Superior Anna Borkowska (Mother Bertranda), who was the first to supply hand grenades and other weapons to the Vilnius ghetto underground.

== 1942: Relative peace ==
During 1942, the FPO was mainly engaged in acquiring weapons and attempting to transmit information about the extermination of Lithuanian Jews in Lithuania. Based on their place of residence in the ghetto, the members of the organization were divided into fives, 3 fives made up a platoon (roughly 15), and 6–8 platoons made up a battalion (ranging from 100 to 120 in strength). Representatives of all the parties and movements that were part of it were at the organization's headquarters. Grenades and Molotov cocktails were produced in the ghetto itself. Rifles and other weapons were purchased from the local population. The organization sent messengers to the ghettos of Grodno, Warsaw, and Bialystok, with news of the extermination of the Jews in Vilnius.

At this stage of the struggle, there were no disagreements between the underground and the Judenrat leadership. The head of the Judenrat, Jacob Gens, a former Lithuanian army officer, knew about the existence of the FPO and maintained contacts with it, supporting the organization as long as it did not fight the Judenrat and did not harm the productivity of the labour in the ghetto.

== 1943 ==
The period of peaceful coexistence between the underground and the Judenrat ended in the spring of 1943. Several groups of ghetto youth went into the forests to join the partisans. Representatives of the partisans arrived in the ghetto. The Sicherheitsdienst (SD) warned Gens about the possible consequences of the underground's activities in the ghetto. Gens, who saw the organization's actions as a threat to the existence of the ghetto, began to fight the Jewish underground.

=== May ===
In May 1943, the Germans demanded that the Judenrat give them 50 people to carry out work in Panevėžys. Gens decided to include the central figures of the FPO in this list in order to remove them from Vilnius. The organization's headquarters went underground and the Judenrat abandoned this attempt. In the spring of 1943, the FPO established permanent contact with Soviet partisans operating in the surrounding forests.

=== July: Wittenberg affair ===
In early 1943, the Germans caught a resistance member in the forest. The Judenrat, one of the widely used administrative agencies imposed by Nazi Germany, in response to German threats, gave Wittenberg over to the Gestapo. The FPO planned an uprising. The FPO was able to rescue Wittenberg through an armed struggle and then set up a small militia. The Judenrat did not tolerate this, because the Nazis gave them an ultimatum to end the resistance or face extermination. The Judenrat knew that Jews were smuggling weapons into the ghetto and when a Jew was arrested for buying a revolver, they finally gave the FPO an order to withdraw. The Judenrat turned the people against the resistance members by making them seem like selfish enemies who were provoking the Nazis. Jacob Gens emphasized the people's responsibility for one another, saying that resistance was sacrificing the good of the community. As the Germans demanded that Wittenberg should be handed over to them, the Judenrat and Gens convinced the majority of the inhabitants of the ghetto to acquiesce to that request, arguing that tens of thousands should not be sacrificed for the sake of one man. As people assembled insisting that Wittenberg should be given to the Germans, he agreed to surrender to the Gestapo and was found dead in his cell on the next morning, having committed suicide according to most accounts. Discouraged by the attitude of the population of the ghetto, the FPO decided not to resist there and began to gradually relocate to the forests.

In July 1943, Gens was ordered by the Germans to hand over Yitzhak Wittenberg to them. On 15 July, he invited the FPO leadership to his home and during the conversation arrested Wittenberg, who was later released as a result of an FPO operation. Gens published a statement in which he informed the ghetto residents that failure to hand over the organization's commander would lead to the destruction of the ghetto. Under pressure from the residents, Wittenberg decided to surrender to the Germans, which he did on 16 July. The next day, he was found dead. As a result of Wittenberg's arrest and surrender, the FPO decided to prepare for the organization's members to move into the forests and join the partisans. Abba Kovner became the new commander of the FPO.

==== 24 July 24 ====
On 24 July 1943, the first group of underground fighters, calling themselves the "Leon Group" after Wittenberg's underground pseudonym, left the ghetto for the Naroch forests east of Vilnius. The group was commanded by Josef Glazman. At the end of the month, the Germans carried out an action in the ghetto in retaliation for the group's exit and warned that if a ghetto prisoner escaped, all of his relatives would be exterminated.

=== August and September ===
In August 1943, the deportation of ghetto prisoners to Estonia began. During the action carried out on 1 September, the FPO issued an order to mobilize two battalions for armed struggle against the Germans. Due to betrayal, one of the battalions, numbering 100 people, was destroyed by the Germans and Estonians. On the same day, the organization issued an appeal calling for forceful resistance to the deportation. The ghetto residents, who believed that they were being taken to Estonia for work and not for extermination, did not respond to this appeal. The FPO did not succeed in its mission. The Jews were deported from Vilnius without opposition.

Because of the deportation and the lack of desire to resist among the ghetto residents, the FPO switched to supporting young people who wanted to continue the struggle in the forests. In early September, a group of 70 people from Yechiel Sheinbaum's organization went to the Rūdninkai Forest.

=== September 1943: Joining the Soviet partisans ===
On 23 September 1943, the day the ghetto was destroyed, a group of FPO members led by Abba Kovner left the ghetto through the sewers and joined Sheinbaum's group. In the forests, the detachment was quickly replenished with Jewish fighters and was divided into four groups: "Avenger", "To Victory", "Death to Fascism", and "In the Fight". Gens took control of the liquidation so as to rid the ghetto of the Germans, but helped fill the quota of Jews with those who would fight but were not necessarily part of the resistance. The FPO fled to the forest, where most were able to reach Soviet partisan units. FPO members participated in the Vilnius offensive led by the Soviet army in July 1944.

== Notable members ==
Fania Brancovskaja, 22 May 1922 – 22 September 2024 (aged 102), was the last known surviving member of the Fareynikte Partizaner Organizatsye. Remaining in Lithuania after the war, she served as the Vilnius Yiddish Institute's librarian.

== See also ==
- Anti-fascism
- Ghetto uprising
- History of the Jews during World War II
- Jewish partisans
- Jewish resistance under Nazi rule
- List of last surviving World War II veterans
- Resistance during World War II
- Vilna Ghetto
- Shtil, di nakht iz oysgeshternt
