= Vilna Ghetto =

Ghetto for Jews in Lithuania in World War II

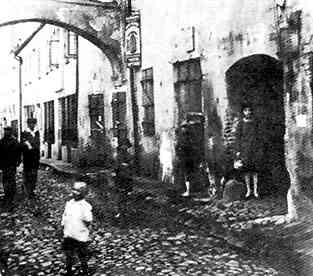
- Vilna Ghetto (Julian Klaczko Street), 1941

- Location within Lithuania
- Location: Vilnius Old Town; 54°40′40″N 25°16′59″E
- Date: 6 September 1941 to 24 September 1943
- Incident type: Imprisonment, mass shootings, forced labor, starvation, exile
- Organizations: Nazi SS, Ypatingasis būrys
- Camp: Kailis forced labor camp HKP 562 forced labor camp
- Victims: About 55,000 Jews

The Vilna Ghetto (Note: The name Vilna Ghetto is from the Hebrew language. Andrew Noble Koss (2010). Remaking of Jewish Vilna, 1914-1918. Stanford University. p. ix. The city's name is written Vilnius in Lithuanian, Wilno in Polish, Vilna in Hebrew and Russian, Vilne in Yiddish, and Wilna in German.) was a World War II Jewish ghetto established and operated by Nazi Germany in the city of Vilnius in the modern country of Lithuania, at the time part of the Nazi-administered Reichskommissariat Ostland.

During the approximately two years of its existence, starvation, disease, street executions, maltreatment, and deportations to concentration and extermination camps reduced the ghetto's population from an estimated 40,000.

Only several hundred of the city's pre-war Jewish population managed to survive the war, mostly by hiding in the forests surrounding the city, by joining Soviet partisans, or by sheltering with sympathetic locals.

== Background ==
Before the German-Soviet invasion of Poland in September 1939, Wilno (Vilna in Yiddish) was the capital of the Wilno Voivodship in the Second Polish Republic. The predominant languages of the city were Polish and, to a lesser extent, Yiddish. The Lithuanian-speaking population at the time was a small minority, at about 6% of the city's population according to contemporary Lithuanian sources. By 1931, the city had 195,000 inhabitants. According to the census of 1938 there was a slight increase so that the urban population was registered at around 208, 000, making it the fifth largest city in Poland, with varied industries and new factories, as well as a well respected university.

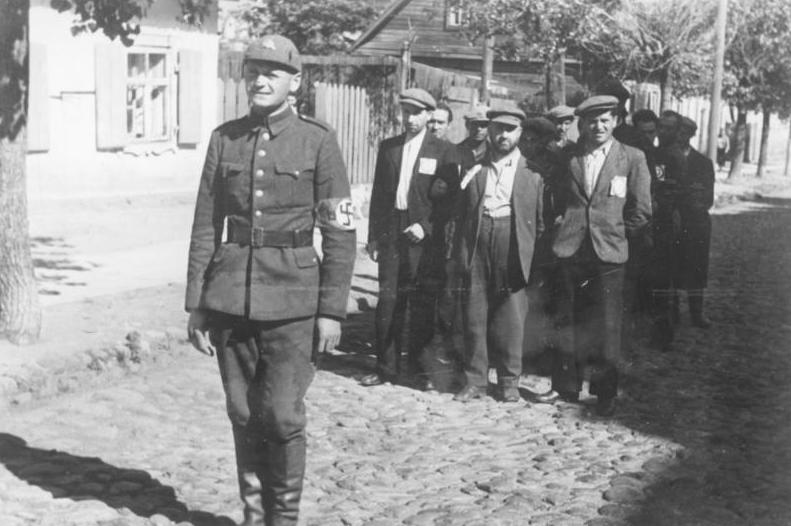
Lithuanian Nazi policeman with Jewish prisoners, July 1941

Wilno was a predominantly Polish and Jewish city since the Polish-Lithuanian borders were delineated in 1922 by the League of Nations in the aftermath of Żeligowski's Mutiny. After the Soviet invasion of Poland in September 1939, Joseph Stalin transferred Wilno to Lithuania in October, according to the Soviet–Lithuanian Mutual Assistance Treaty. Some two years later, on 26 June 1941, the German Army entered Vilna, followed by the Einsatzkommando death squad Einsatzgruppe B. Local Lithuanian leaders advocated for the ethnic cleansing of Jews and Poles. Throughout the summer, German troops and their Lithuanian collaborators killed more than 21,000 Jews living in Vilnius, in a mass extermination program.

The Jewish population of Vilnius on the eve of the Holocaust was at least 60,000, some estimates say 80,000, including refugees from German-occupied Poland to the west, minus a small number who managed to flee onward to the Soviet Union. The kidnapping and mass murder of Jews in the city commenced before the ghetto was set up by the advancing German forces, resulting in an execution of approximately 21,000 victims prior to 6 September 1941. The Lithuanian kidnappers were known in Yiddish as hapunes, meaning grabbers or snatchers.

== 1941: Establishment of the ghetto ==
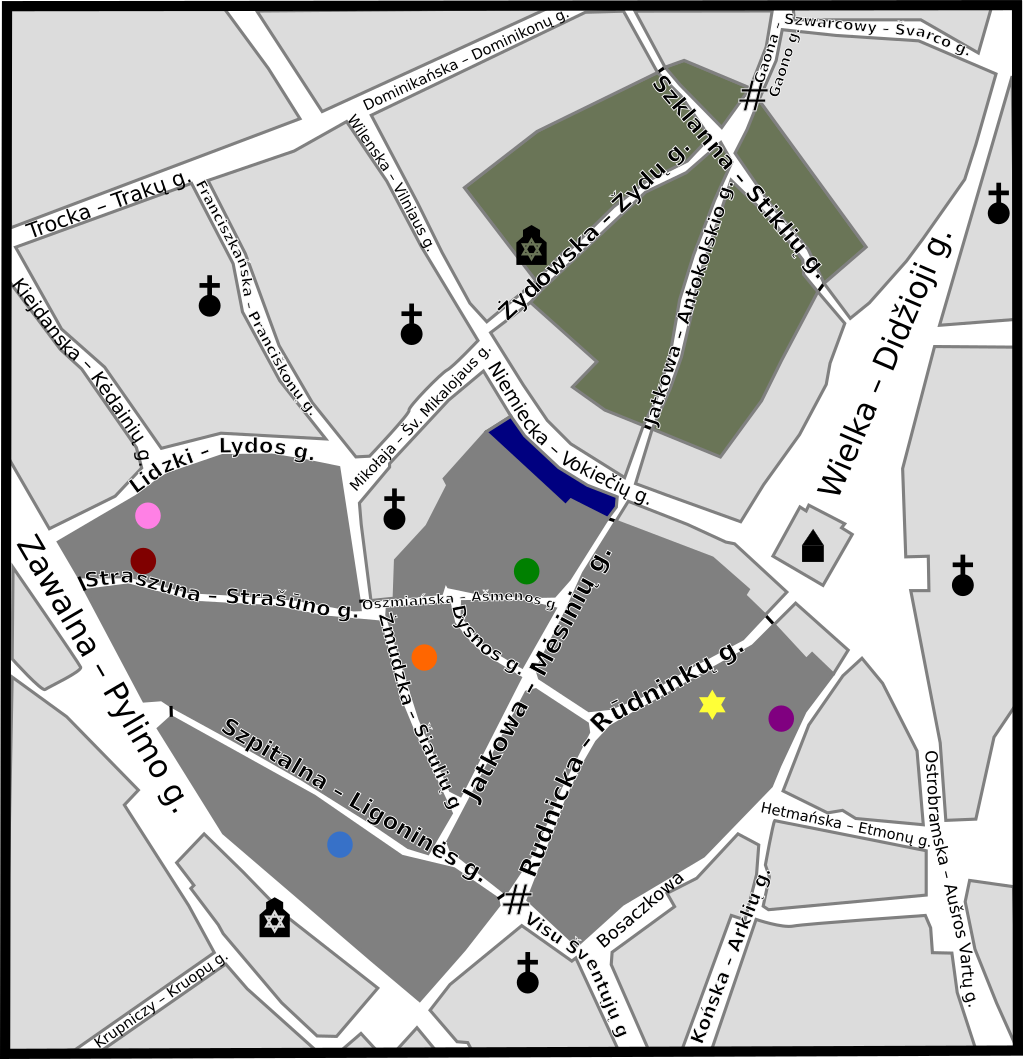
Map of Vilna Ghetto (small ghetto, in olive-green)

In order to pacify the predominantly poorer Jewish quarter in the Vilnius Old Town and force the rest of the more affluent Jewish residents into the new German-envisioned ghetto, the Nazis staged – as a pretext – the Great Provocation incident on 31 August 1941, led by SS Einsatzkommando 9 Oberscharführer Horst Schweinberger under orders from Gebietskommissar of the Vilnius municipality, Hans Christian Hingst, and Franz Murer, Hingst's deputy for Jewish affairs under "provisional directives" of Reichskommissar Hinrich Lohse.

Murer, Hingst, and Vilnius mayor Karolis Dabulevičius selected the site for the future ghetto and staged a distant sniping at German soldiers in front of a cinema. The charade was enacted from a window on the corner of Stiklių Street (Glezer, meaning Szklana in Polish) and Didžioji Street (Wielka, Great Street in Polish). Hence, the name 'Wielka' to describe the event that occurred on the streets. As part of the deception two Lithuanians in civilian clothes broke into an apartment belonging to Jews. The Lithuanians then fled the apartment. Then they returned with awaiting German soldiers that captured two Jews, accusing them of firing on the German soldiers. They beat them and then shot them on the spot. Stiklių and Mėsinių (Jatkowa) streets were ransacked by the local militia and the Lithuanian auxiliary police, while other Jews were beaten up.

At night, in "retaliation", all Jews were driven out of the neighborhood the Nazis had selected as the future ghetto territory, forcing the people out street by street. Over the next day they rounded up the women and children on the remaining streets while the men were seized at work. Men with specific trades and at privileged workplaces were also seized. Jews were taken to Lukiškės Prison, then to Paneriai, also known as Ponary (or Ponar), where they were murdered between 1 September and 3 September. 5,000 to 10,000 people were murdered, including ten members of the Judenrat. The objective was to clear an area for the establishment of a ghetto to imprison all the Jews of Vilnius and its suburbs.

The area designated for the ghetto was the old Jewish quarter in the center of the city. While Vilna never had a ghetto per se except for some very limited restrictions on the movement and settlement of Jews during the Middle Ages, the area chosen by the Nazis for their ghetto was predominantly and historically inhabited by Jews. The Nazis split the area into two Jewish quarters (the 'Large Ghetto' and the 'Small Ghetto'), with a non-ghetto corridor running down Deutschegasse (Niemiecka or Vokiečių Street).

On 6–7 September 1941, the Nazis herded the remaining 20,000 Jews into the two ghettos by evicting them from their homes, during which 3,700 were killed. The intention was to crowd the majority of the Jewish inhabitants into an area in which there had been space previously for only 4, 000 people. That meant intense overcrowding, the reduced area of living space and the general lack of hygiene and sanitation which led to the widespread outbreak of illness and diseases like typhus.

No Jewish person was spared from this measure of Ghettoization. Even Converts, "half-Jews", and spouses of Jews were also forced into the ghetto. The move to the ghetto was extremely hurried, haphazard and difficult. Jews were not allowed to use transportation and had to take only what they were physically able to carry while being escorted by the Lithuanian auxilary police force ('Hilfspolizei').

The first Aktion was called the Gelbe Schein (yellow pass) Aktion. The Germans delivered 3,000 passes (or 'Scheine' as stated in German) to Jewish workers and their families. They let 12,000 people into the ghetto. However, it is estimated that between 25 and 27 October 1941, 3,781 people without the pass were taken in Lkw trucks or lorries to be killed in Ponary.

The two-ghetto arrangement made it easier for the Nazis to control what the victims knew of their fate beforehand. The main administrative organ was the German 'Stadtkommissariat' under whose authority operated the local Lithuanian 'Hilfspolizei' as well as a detachment of SS guards. There was also the aforementioned Jewish Ghetto administration (namely the 'Judenrat') and an autonomous Jewish police force ('Ordnungsdienst') that had to smooth the implementation of often hurried and drastic measures sometimes resulting in a grave loss of life. Through harbouring all the different agencies of administration and surveillance the Nazis were able to facilitate their goal of total extermination.

A two-ghetto model was also used in Warsaw. Like the other Jewish ghettos Nazi Germany set up during World War II, the Vilnius Ghetto was created both to dehumanise the people and to exploit its inmates as slave labor. A large portion of the Ghetto inhabitants was employed in the fur industry ('Pelzindustrie' in German or Yiddish). There were places of work inside the Ghetto but also outside to where the workers had to be escorted. Some of the work places came under the jurisdiction of the German Army and the German civil administration in which German administrators and businessmen played their part. It's estimated that around 1,000 unfit labourers were shot on a weekly basis.

Towards the end of 1941 a part of the small ghetto ('kleines Ghetto') was ordered to be 'cleared' or in the German bureaucratic jargon of the time to become 'aufgelöst.' 1500 ihabitants of the 'kleines Ghetto' were shot. Around that time in October 1941 specialist workers in the fur or textile industries were temporarily exempt from harsh treatment or execution. Along with their family members they received the 'Gelbe Arbeitsschein.'

Willi Dreßen, a consultant for the Enzyklopädie des Nationalsozialismus suggests a higher number of victims during the so-called 'Gelbe Schein Aktion.' He estimates that around 5000 to 8000 Jews without the 'Schein' ('permit') were separated from the majority of the Ghetto inhabitants and shot on 24 October 1941. In the following December, as the bitterness of winter intensified, the 'Gelbe Schein' could be exchanged for a rose-pink 'Schein.' Those who couldn't show any permit on demand were shot. 3000 people were executed in this way on 5 November 1941.

In the meantime conditions worsened. It was the intention of the different administrative agencies responsible for the Ghetto to make Life more difficult with families and individuals living precariously on a day to day basis. It was intended to make them extremely poor and susceptible to the widespread overcrowding, while subjecting the inhabitants to unsanitary conditions, disease, and a range of epidemics and illnesses.

== 1942: Quiet period ==
=== Health care ===
Jewish Vilna was known for its distinguished medical tradition, which inmates of the ghetto managed to maintain to some degree during the Holocaust. As with most ghettos established by the Germans, a sign was put right outside in front stating: "Achtung! Seuchengefahr" ("Attention! Danger of Infection"). Mortality rates did, indeed, increase in the Vilna Ghetto as compared with before the war. However, due largely to the efforts of the ghetto's Health Department, the Vilna Ghetto had no major epidemics despite malnourishment, cold, and overcrowding. According to Dr. Lazar Epstein, head of Sanitary-Epidemiological Section of the ghetto's Health Department, the inmates of the ghetto, left to their own devices, could have lived a very long time, certainly to the end of the war, despite the numerous privations.

=== Cultural life ===
The Vilna Ghetto was called "Yerushalayim of the Ghettos" because it was known for its intellectual and cultural spirit. Before the war, Vilnius had been known as "Yerushalayim d'Lita" (Yiddish: Jerusalem of Lithuania) for the same reason. The center of cultural life in the ghetto was the Mefitze Haskole Library, which was called the "House of Culture". It contained a library of 45,000 volumes, reading hall, archive, statistical bureau, room for scientific work, museum, book kiosk, post office, and sports ground. Groups, such as the Literary and Artistic Union and the Brit Ivrit Union, organized events commemorating Yiddish and Hebrew authors and put on plays in these languages. The popular Yiddish magazine Folksgezunt was continued in the ghetto and its essays were presented in public lectures. Yitskhok Rudashevski (1927–1943), a young teen who wrote a diary of his life in the ghetto during 1941 to 1943, mentions a number of these events and his participation in them. He was murdered in the liquidation of 1943, probably at Paneriai. His diary was discovered in 1944 by his cousin.

The Vilna Ghetto was well known for its theatrical productions during World War II. Jacob Gens, the head of the Jewish police ('Ordnungsdienst') and the ruler of the Vilna Ghetto, was given the responsibility for the starting of this theatre. Performances included poetry readings by Jewish authors, dramatizations of short stories, and new work by the young people of the ghetto.

The Ghetto Theatre was a great source of revenue and had a calming effect on the public. A total of 111 performances had been given by January 10, 1943, with a total of 34,804 tickets sold. The theatre was renovated to accommodate a larger audience and to make the façade and interior better-looking to the public eye. The theatre permitted the inhabitants to display their power through plays and songs; for instance, one of the songs that was sung was called "Endurance".

The last theatrical production, Der Mabl (The Flood), was produced by the Swedish dramatist Henning Berger. Opening night was one summer's eve in 1943. The play brought in the crowds but the theatre was to experience the last week of its existence for the Ghetto itself was scheduled to be liquidated. The play, set in an American saloon during a flood, featured a group of people who banded together during a time of danger and need. Its metaphorical resonance must have reached out to the audience, especially the young theatre-goers who must have thought surely there had to be time for some organized resistance.

After the period of cultural activity and of a relative stabilization of every-day Life in the Ghetto, the inhabitants couldn't believe the acceleration once again of the murderous policy of the occupiers. Many were duped into believing they were being 'resettled.' On 23 September 1943 the main deportations began again on a level comparable with 1941.

However, this time the Ghetto community was being threatened with extinction. In 4 days up until 27 September thousands of the Ghetto's inhabitants were 'transported' to Vaivara, the main concentration camp (with its satellite workcamps) in Estonia. Another substantial part of the Ghetto's population was sent by rail to Treblinka, the death camp north-east of Warsaw.

Only around 3,000 people remained behind principally those who were considered 'essential workers' (in German:'Die benötigte Arbeitskräfte'). They were entitled to work and could continue living with their families. This was due in some small measure to the German Army under whose jurisdiction the workers were employed.

RFSS Heinrich Himmler, however, wanted to 'coordinate' the complete and utter fulfilment of the 'Final Solution.' As a result of this acceleration of policy the majority of remaining Ghettos in the occupied East had to be liquidated including that of Vilnius.

=== Resistance ===
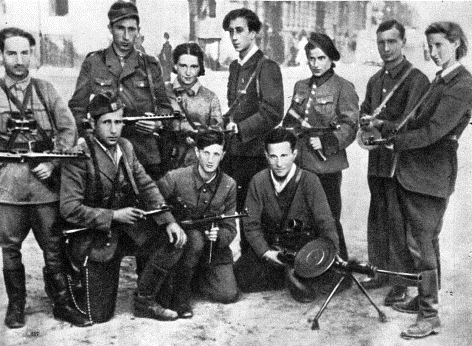
Abba Kovner (center, standing) with FPO members

The Fareynikte Partizaner Organizatsye (FPO), or United Partisan Organization, was formed on 21 January 1942 in the ghetto. It took for its motto "We will not go like sheep to the slaughter," proposed by Abba Kovner. This was one of the first resistance organizations established in a Nazi ghetto. Unlike in other ghettos, the resistance movement in the Vilna Ghetto was not run by ghetto officials. Jacob Gens, appointed head of the ghetto by the Nazis but originally chief of police, ostensibly cooperated with German officials in stopping armed struggle. The FPO represented the full spectrum of political persuasions and parties in Jewish life. It was led by Yitzhak Wittenberg, Josef Glazman, and Kovner. The purposes of the FPO were to establish a means for the self-defence of the ghetto population, to sabotage German industrial and military activities, and to support the broader struggle of partisans and Red Army operatives against German forces. Poet Hirsh Glick, a ghetto inmate who later died after being deported to Estonia, penned the words for what became the famous Partisan Hymn, Zog nit keyn mol.

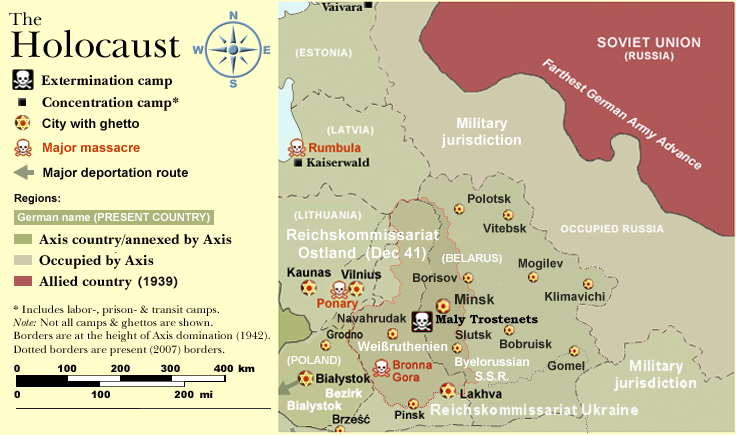
Reichskommissariat Ostland ghettos (marked with red-and-gold stars)

In early 1943, the Germans caught a member of the Communist underground, who, under torture, revealed some contacts; the Judenrat, in response to German threats, tried to turn Wittenberg, head of the FPO, over to the Gestapo. The Fareynikte Partizaner Organizatsye organized an uprising and was able to rescue him after he was seized in the apartment of Jacob Gens in a fight with Jewish ghetto police. Gens brought in heavies, the leaders of the work brigades, and effectively turned the majority of the population against the resistance members, claiming they were provoking the Germans and asking rhetorically whether it was worth sacrificing tens of thousands for the sake of one man. Ghetto prisoners assembled and demanded the FPO give Wittenberg up. Ultimately, Wittenberg himself made the decision to submit to Nazi demands. He was taken to Gestapo headquarters in Vilnius and was reportedly found dead in his cell the next morning. Most people believed he had committed suicide. The rumour was that Gens had slipped him a cyanide pill in their final meeting.

The FPO was demoralized by this chain of events and began to pursue a policy of sending young people out to the forest to join other Jewish partisans. This was controversial as well because the Germans applied a policy of 'collective responsibility' under which all family members of anyone who had joined the partisans were executed. In the Vilna Ghetto, a 'family' often included a non-relation who registered as a member of the family in order to receive housing and a pitiful food ration.

When the Germans came to liquidate the ghetto in September 1943, members of the FPO went on alert. Gens took control of the liquidation in order to keep the Nazi forces out of the ghetto and away from a partisan ambush, but helped fill the quota of Jews with those who could fight but were not necessarily part of the resistance. The FPO fled to the forest and fought with the partisans.

== 1943: Liquidation ==
From the establishment of the ghetto until January 1942, task groups of German and Lithuanian Einsatzgruppen regularly carried out the surprise operations called Aktionen, often on Jewish holidays. The ghetto residents were rounded up and deported, usually for subsequent executions. In the Aktion on Yom Kippur of 1 October 1941, the Germans ordered the Judenrat to lead the arrests leading to the death of 1,983 people; residents found by the Jewish police lacking work permits ('Arbeitsscheine') were arrested and transferred to German custody. The same month, the Germans liquidated the 'Small Ghetto' ('Kleines Ghetto'), where they had relocated 'unproductive' individuals (i.e., those who were old, ill, or otherwise considered unfit for labour); most of the prisoners were taken to Ponary and shot. About 20,000 Jews, including 8,000 without papers or work permits, remained in the 'Large Ghetto' ('Großes Ghetto').

The period between January 1942 and March 1943 was known as the time of 'Ghetto Stabilization'; the Aktionen ceased and some semblance of normal life resumed. The quiet period continued until 6 August, when the Germans commenced the deportation of 7,130 Jews to Vaivara Concentration Camp in Estonia on the order of Heinrich Himmler who wanted to accelerate the course of the 'Final Solution.' The deportation was carried out and made complete on 5 September. Following an order of Rudolf Neugebauer, the head of the Vilnius Gestapo, the ghetto was liquidated on 23–24 September 1943 under the command of Oberscharführer Bruno Kittel. The majority of the Ghetto's inhabitants were sent to the Vaivara concentration camp in Estonia, killed in the forest of Paneriai (otherwise known as Ponary), or sent to Treblinka, the death camp in German-occupied Poland.

A small group of Jews remained in Vilna after the liquidation of the Ghetto, primarily at the Kailis and HKP 562 forced labour camps. Inmates of HKP 562 repaired automobiles for the German Army; the camp was commanded by the Wehrmacht Major Karl Plagge who, with the cooperation of his officers and men, was able to shield the Jewish auto-workers from much of the abuse slave laborers were ordinarily subjected to.

When the Red Army approached Vilna in early summer 1944 as the SS came to take over the camp, Plagge gave his workers a covert warning; some workers escaped, while others hid in hiding- places they had prepared with Plagge's knowledge, from which they subsequently escaped.

With the long awaited arrival of the Red Army becoming a reality the majority of Germans, including a mixed bag of SS, Lithuanian Hilfspolizei and Wehrmacht soldiers, were imprisoned by the Soviets within the perimeter of the former and emptied Vilna Ghetto.

The Soviets gradually began to realize the enormity of the crimes committed inside the Vilna Ghetto and in the woods outside the city in Ponary. Of Vilna's original Jewish population perhaps less than 500 survived the war. Figures of actual survivors are difficult to substantiate, but those among the youthful members of the community that scurried away to join the partisans in the woods had the best chances of survival.

Of the 3,000 Jews and their families in 'essential work' under the direction of the German Army and the German civil administration (and not the Gestapo and SS) around two-hundred and fifty Jews (mostly men) working for Karl Plagge at HKP 562 survived the war. The ill and sick among the workforce and all family dependents, including all the children, were shot by the SS in Ponary on 27 March 1944. Many other Jews experienced the same fate in early July 1944.

The sum total of those murdered in Ponary lies between 70,000 and 100,000. Of those among the Jewish 'Arbeitskommando' that had to clear away the dead bodies 15 survived. They escaped during a breakout attempt on 15 April 1944. As the only witnesses left alive they could describe all that had happened in Ponary.

The Red Army reached the empty Ghetto on the eve of 12/13 July 1944. Could the Soviets have come sooner and linked up with the Jewish and local partisans? The Jews saved by Major Karl Plagge represent the single largest group of Jewish survivors of the Holocaust in Vilna.

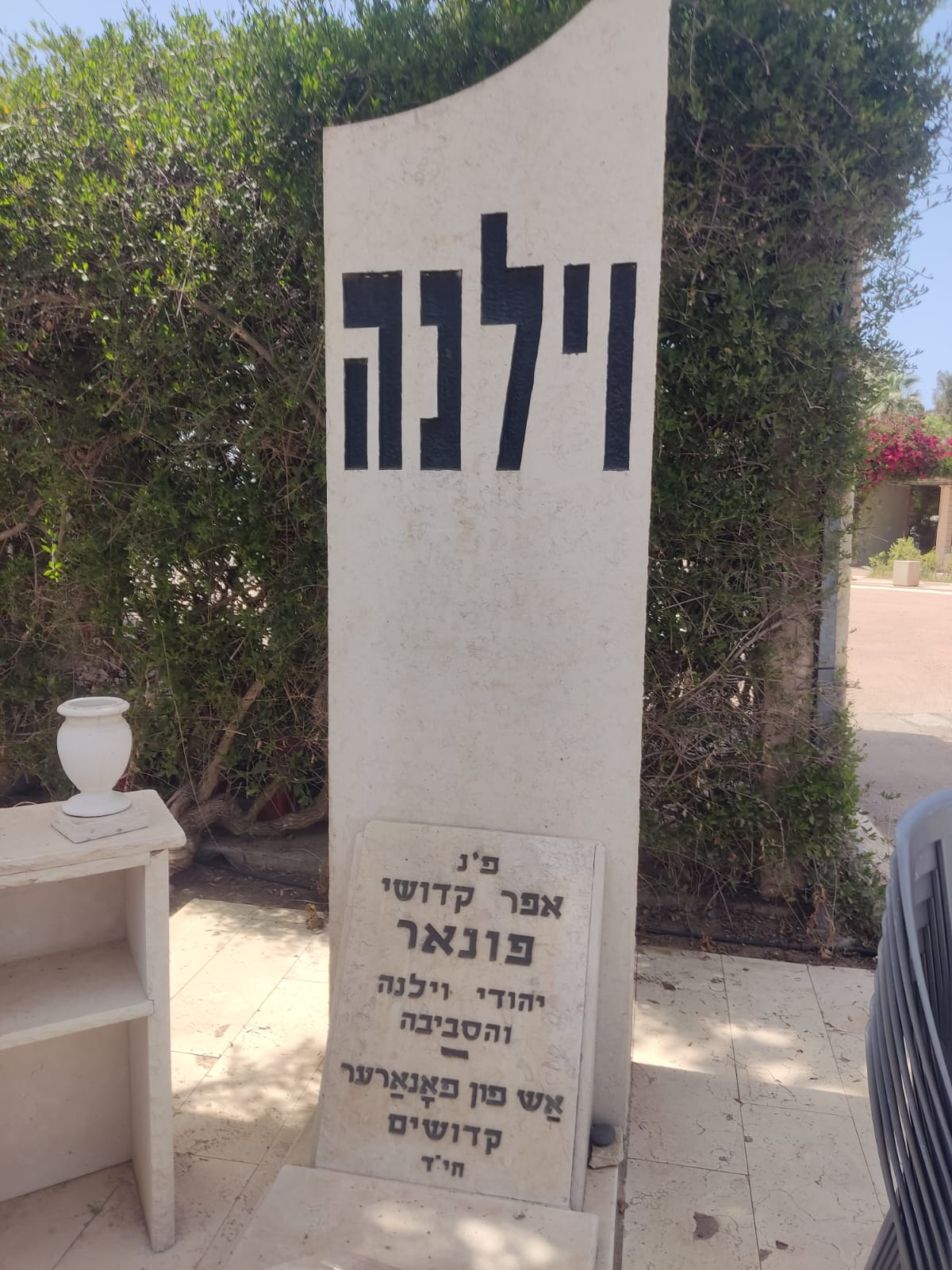
A monument in memory of the Jews of Vilnius who were murdered in the Holocaust. In Kiryat Shaul cemetery in Tel Aviv

== Post-war ==
Among all the European Jewish communities during WWII, the Lithuanian one was the most affected by the Holocaust. Rising to 265,000 individuals in June 1941, it was decimated and lost 254,000, or 95%, of its members during the Nazi occupation of Lithuania. The Green House Museum, a branch of the Vilna Gaon Jewish State Museum, reminds visitors of massive collaboration, presenting documents and testimonials. Rachel Kostanian was awarded the Order of Merits from Germany for this achievement in 2021.

Joshua Sobol's 1984 play Ghetto recounts the last days of the Vilna Ghetto theatre company.

In 2021, a virtual 360-degree tour about the former Vilnius Ghetto was created to present arts, education and creative endeavours within the ghetto in horrifying circumstances.

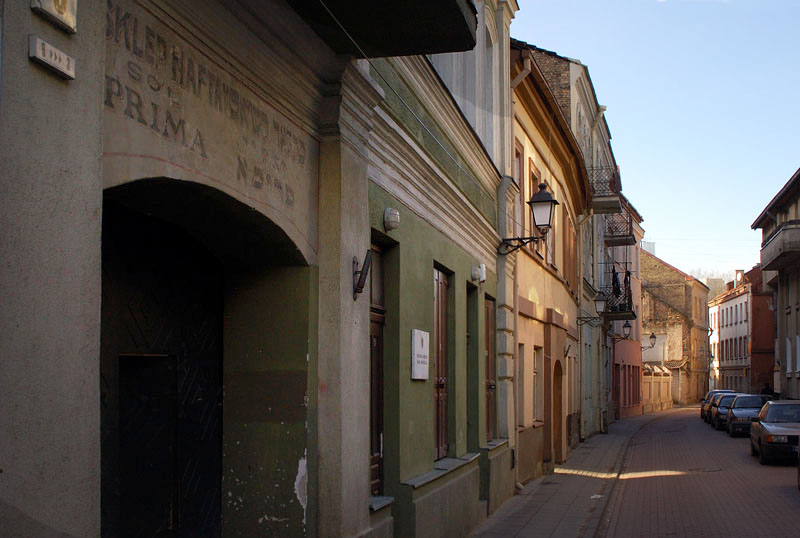
Straszuna Street (the Polish name), now Žemaitijos Street, in the former ghetto

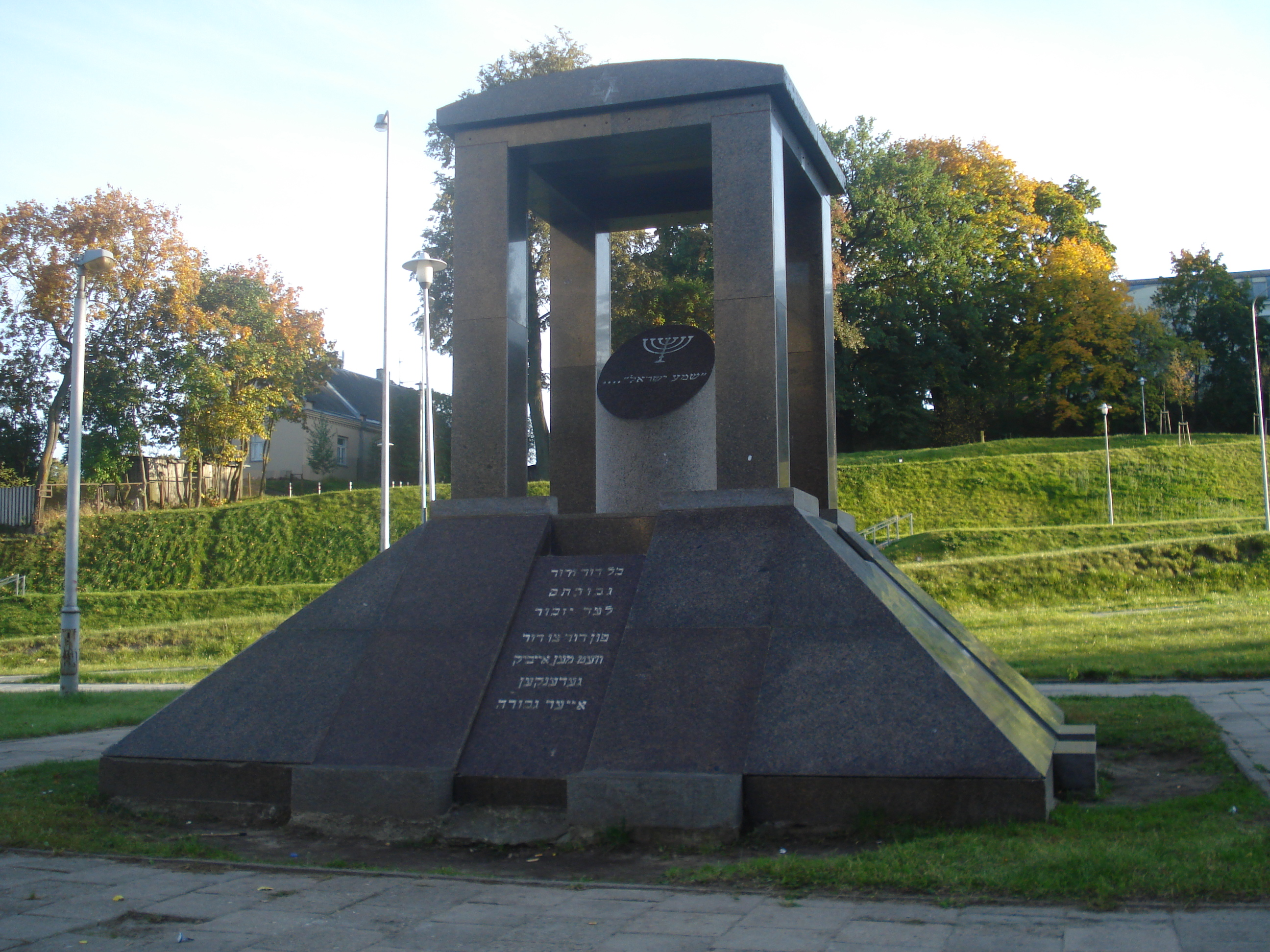
Holocaust memorial, Subačiaus Street, near site of HKP 562 forced-labor camp

== People of the Vilna Ghetto ==
- Samuel Bak (1933-), artist who lived in the ghetto as a child
- Jacob Gens (1903–1943), head of police of the ghetto
- Josef Glazman (1913–1943), ghetto resistance fighter
- Hirsh Glick (1922–1944), ghetto resistance fighter
- Shmerke Kaczerginski (1908-1954), writer, book smuggler, ghetto resistance fighter
- Bruno Kittel (1922–?), SS-Oberscharführer, brought in to liquidate the ghetto after Murer
- Abba Kovner (1918–1987), ghetto resistance fighter
- Herman Kruk (1897–1944), librarian, and a diarist of the ghetto
- Ljuba Lewicka (1909–1943), singer
- Franz Murer (1912–1994), SS-Oberscharführer, the 'Butcher of Vilnius'
- Rudolf Neugebauer (1912–1944), SS-Hauptsturmführer
- Theodor Adrian von Renteln (1897–1960), Generalkommissar of Lithuania, involved in the liquidation of the ghetto
- Yitskhok Rudashevski (1927–1943), writer of a diary in the ghetto
- Abraham Sutzkever (1913–2010), poet, book smuggler, ghetto resistance fighter
- Rachela Suckewer (1904-1943/1944), graphic artist
- Martin Weiss (1903–1984), SS-Hauptscharführer
- Yitzhak Wittenberg (1907–1943), ghetto resistance fighter

== See also ==
- History of the Jews in Lithuania
- Jewish response to The Forty Days of Musa Dagh
- Karl Plagge (1897–1957), Major, in charge of HKP 562 forced labor camp
- List of Jewish ghettos in German-occupied Poland

== Bibliography ==
- Arad, Yitzhak. Ghetto in Flames (Jerusalem: Yad Vashem, Martyrs' and Heroes' Remembrance Authority; Ktav Pub. House; printed by Ahva Cooperative Printing Press, 1980). ISBN 9780870687532
- Balberyszski, Mendel 'Stronger Than Iron': The Destruction of Vilna Jewry 1941–1945 – An Eyewitness Account (Jerusalem: Gefen Publishing House, 2010). ISBN 9789652294852
- Feierstein, Daniel. "The Jewish Resistance Movements in the Ghettos of Eastern Europe." In: Life in the Ghettos During the Holocaust. Ed. Eric J. Sterling (Syracuse: Syracuse University Press, 2005). ISBN 9780815608035
- Kostanian-Danzig, Rachel. Spiritual Resistance in the Vilna Ghetto (Vilnius: The Vilna Gaon Jewish State Museum, 2002). ISBN 9789986938729
- Kruk, Herman. The Last Days of the Jerusalem of Lithuania: Chronicles from the Vilna Ghetto and the Camps, 1939–1944 (New Haven: Yale University Press, 2002). ISBN 9780300044942
- Rudashevski, Yitskhok (1927–1943). Diary of the Vilna Ghetto, June 1941 – April 1943 (Israel: Ghetto Fighters' House, 1973). OCLC 2019892
- Shneidman, N.N. Jerusalem of Lithuania: The Rise and Fall of Jewish Vilnius, A Personal Perspective (Okaville, ON: Mosaic Press, 1998). ISBN 9780889626591
