= Rudolf Neugebauer =

German SS officer during the Nazi era

- Born: 12 December 1912; Austria-Hungary
- Died: 1 February 1945 (aged 32); Budapest, Hungary
- Cause of death: Killed in action
- Known for: Perpetration of the Holocaust
- SS career
- Allegiance: Nazi Germany
- Branch: Waffen-SS
- Rank: SS-Hauptsturmführer
- Commands: Vilnius Gestapo
- Awards: War Merit Cross First Class with Swords

Rudolf Neugebauer (21 December 1912 – 1 February 1945) was a German SS Hauptsturmführer during the Nazi era. He served as the head of the Vilnius Gestapo (Secret State Police) in German-occupied Lithuania and personally killed Jacob Gens.

== Biography ==
Neugebauer became an SA (Sturmabteilung) of the original paramilitary wing of the NSDAP in 1931 (party number 1086615). In 1938, he joined the SS (SS number: 266047) and worked for the SDHA (Sicherheitsdiensthauptamt), the headquarters of the intelligence agency of the SS and NSDAP.

As the Third Reich annexed Austria, he worked for the Kripo (KriminalPolizei) and the Staatspolizei (state police) in Vienna from 1938 to 1940. He was promoted to Kriminalkommissar of the Prussian zone in 1941.

From February 1942 to October 1943, Neugebauer was Obersturmführer and headed the Vilnius Gestapo as the Vilna Ghetto was in a "quiet" phase. He was a member the Einsatzkommando 3 who took part in the Ponary massacre. He imposed the concept of "collective responsibility" where relatives of someone who escaped were executed. As such he ordered the murders of 32 relatives after the escape of several young Jewish partisans on 24 July 1943. At the end of July 1943, Neugebauer set up economic restrictions on the Jewish activities (e.g. no more night work, exclusion from trading from 4 August 1943). On 3 September, one testimony describes Neugebauer sparing the life of an HKP 52 worker. On 4 September 1943, he murdered Jacob Gens, the leader of the Judenrat (ghetto government), after he reported himself. Gens was accused by the Gestapo of providing money to the FPO (United Partisan Organization). He ordered Bruno Kittel to liquidate the Vilna Ghetto on 22–23 September 1943 and was then transferred to the Kovno Ghetto.

At the end of 1944, he was seconded to Budapest by the Darmstadt Gestapo as the Budapest Ghetto was being created and the Red Army was closing in since the beginning of the offensive on the town on 19 October 1944. He is considered as missing in action. His death is registered at the communal cemetery of Salzburg with "12.1945 in Budapest".

He was awarded the War Merit Cross First Class with swords (Kriegsverdienstkreuz 1.Klasse mit Schwertern) for exceptional service "not in direct connection with combat".

== See also ==
- Rovno Ghetto
- Ponary massacre
- Bruno Kittel
- Martin Weiss

== Bibliography ==
- Dieckmann 2011, Bd. 1, S. 496ff.; Bd. 2, p. 1269ff.
- Gräfe, Karl-Heinz: Vom Donnerkreuz zum Hakenkreuz, Berlin 2010, p. 476
- Eckert, Christina: Die Mordstätte Paneriai (Ponary) bei Vilnius, in: Bartusevičius u.a. (Hg.): Holocaust in Litauen, Köln 2003, p. 132–142
