= Ghetto (play) =

1984 play by Joshua Sobol

- Front cover of the programme for the Royal National Theatre's 1989 production
- Original language: Hebrew
- Written by: Joshua Sobol
- Subject: Vilna Ghetto
- Setting: 1941, Lithuania.

Premiere
- Date: 1984

Ghetto (Hebrew: גטו) is a play by Israeli playwright Joshua Sobol about the experiences of the Jews of the Vilna Ghetto under Nazi occupation during World War II. The play focuses on the Jewish theatre in the ghetto, incorporating live music, and including as characters historical figures such as Jacob Gens, the chief of the Jewish Ghetto Police and later Head of the ghetto. It is part of a triptych of plays about the Jewish resistance movement, which also includes Adam and Underground. Ghetto premièred at the Haifa Municipal Theatre in Israel and the Freie Volksbühne, Berlin, in 1984, with folk and jazz singer Esther Ofarim as Hayyah.

It was performed in the Olivier Theatre at the Royal National Theatre, London, in an English-language version by David Lan, based on a translation by Miriam Schlesinger. This production opened on 27 April 1989. It was directed by Nicholas Hytner and designed by Bob Crowley. Alex Jennings played Kittel, Jonathan Cullen played Srulik, and Maria Friedman played Hayyah. It won the 1989 Evening Standard Theatre Award for Best Play. A production directed by Gedalia Besser opened at the Circle in the Square Theatre in New York on 30 April 1989.

== Plot synopsis ==
=== Act I ===
The play begins in 1983 in Tel Aviv, as Srulik, an old one-armed man, recalls the last performance in the Jewish theatre in Vilna Ghetto, of which he was the artistic director.

The action shifts to Vilna in 1941. Kittel, the SS commander in charge of the ghetto, orders the Jews to gather clothing of the recently murdered – a massive extermination has just occurred in which over 50,000 Jews were killed. There are only 16,000 Jews left in the ghetto.

As the Jews sort clothes, Kittel catches Hayyah, a former singer, with a kilo of stolen beans. He dumps them out and orders the Jews to gather them up within a minute, but they are only able to retrieve 940 grams. Kittel allows Hayyah to repay him the 60 lost grams by singing songs at his request, and he is deeply attracted to her and moved by her singing. A younger Srulik also makes his first appearance, defending Hayyah through his smart-mouthed dummy. Srulik is attracted to Hayyah as well, but is unable to express his feelings for her without his puppet's voice. Kittel offers the Jews an empty warehouse to use as a theatre, and to put on a performance to entertain him.

We next meet Jacob Gens, the Chief of the Jewish police. To the Jews left in Vilna, he is their enemy, constantly making decisions in league with the Germans that cause families to be separated and people to be killed. But by cooperating and striking up a quasi-friendship with Kittel, Gens saves the lives of many who would normally be killed by obtaining work permits and setting up sewing factories to repair Nazi uniforms. Gens approaches Srulik and reveals that he has saved the lives of many former musicians and actors, and implores Srulik to get them working on a new play so that they may obtain work permits and be kept alive in case of another purge. A Hasidic fortune teller reads Gens's palm, but is a phony. Gens pays him anyway and tells him to get a real job.

Weiskopf, a former factory worker, approaches Gens with a plan to create a sewing workshop to repair Nazi uniforms. Weiskopf is only interested in achieving a higher status among the ghetto leadership, but Gens sees in his plan the opportunity to save more people that could be employed in the workshop. Kittel approves of the plan and Weiskopf is made workshop manager.

We are also introduced to Hermann Kruk, who works in the ghetto library and is compiling a chronicle of Jewish life in the ghetto. Excerpts from his works serve as narrations during the play. Gens comes to Kruk, demanding information about anti-theatre propaganda that has cropped up throughout the ghetto. Kruk is offended by the idea of "Theatre in a Graveyard", but Gens insists that the theater will unite the people of the ghetto.

Kittel orders Weiskopf to provide the actors with costumes, and they improvise a scene depicting a debate between ghetto leaders over which diabetics should be given the limited doses of insulin available. They deduce that only God has the ability to give life, and as people, they cannot choose whom to give the limited supplies to. Kittel then bursts in, ordering Gens to eliminate every third child in the ghetto families, citing a new dictate from the Führer forbidding the increase of the Jewish race. The selection begins, and Kruk narrates a tale of Gens saving the life of a young boy by giving him to a family with only one child. Gens is distraught after the selection, and Ooma comforts him as he laments his position and the impossible decisions he has made.

=== Act II ===
The act begins as citizens of the ghetto pile up Nazi uniforms. The year is now 1943.

Four young people, Luba, Geivish, Yankel and Elia, carry a coffin into the ghetto. Gens catches them and arrests Luba for smuggling, ordering the other three to pay him a donation of five thousand rubles to the school for delinquents in order to free her. While they contemplate their situation, the Hasidic fortune teller offers to read Elia's fortune. When asked for payment, Elia stabs the Hasid and takes 5,000 rubles from his body. They move to put the body in the coffin, but a figure wrapped in shrouds emerges from it and scares them off. The man removes his shrouds and is revealed to be Kittel, who puts on glasses to become a new character, Dr. Ernst Paul, a German scholar of Judaism.

Paul arrives at the library and orders Kruk to gather manuscripts for preservation at his institute for Judaism without Jews. They discuss the future of the Jews in Europe and Gens's seeming betrayal of his race. Paul reveals his sympathies for the Zionist movement, but Kruk defends his belief in his culture as his homeland.

The three murderers of the Hasid are sentenced and hanged. Kittel sees the punishment as demonstrative of autonomous and responsible Jewish rule in the ghetto, and promotes Gens to ruler of the ghetto, while dissolving the Jewish council. Gens invites Kittel and other officials to a ball to celebrate his promotion.

Weiskopf sets up the ball, proclaiming his dislike for the attendees. Jewish prostitutes are brought in and an orgy begins between them and the Jewish police officers as the Germans watch, all to the tune of Hayyah's singing. Srulik's dummy offends Kittel by insulting German military strength, but Weiskopf calms him down by offering him brandy and convincing him to let him meet with Hermann Göring in Berlin to negotiate a new factory deal. Kittel notices Gens not enjoying himself and offers to cheer him up by announcing the annexation of the Oshmene ghetto to Vilna, making Gens in charge of both. Unfortunately, this entails the extermination of half the population of Oshmene, which Gens negotiates down to 600. Kittel sends the Jewish police to do the job, and Kruk's narration remarks on the horror of Jews killing Jews. Gens, alone and drunk after the party, proclaims his objective to save as many Jews as possible, and his intention to submit himself to Jewish justice if he survives the war.

Kruk finds Hayyah searching through the library and gives her a stolen Russian army manual. As she makes her way home, Kittel stops her and expresses his excitement to see her performance in the upcoming play. As she leaves, he again transforms into Dr. Paul and meets with Kruk. Paul gives Kruk a new list of monasteries in Vilna to be cataloged, and assures Kruk that as long as he works for Paul, he will be kept alive. Kruk reminds Paul of the approaching Russian army and denies his involvement with the armed underground resistance in the ghetto.

May Day arrives in the ghetto, and the citizens celebrate with flowers and banners. Hayyah sings a resistance song and Kruk speaks of resisting the Germans to the last man, with the Warsaw Ghetto as their example. Gens bursts onto the scene and orders the anti-Nazi parade to stop, as well as commenting on the lack of Jewish nationalism in the ghetto. He orders that the official language will be Hebrew rather than Yiddish, but Srulik's dummy mocks his nationalism. The crowd disperses, and Hayyah tells Srulik that she plans to leave the ghetto that night through a sewage duct and join the underground. She asks him to go with her, but he refuses, not willing to leave the families unable to leave behind.

Wesikopf inspects the theatre with Gens, who wishes to turn it into a workshop to house 500 more workers. Wesikopf insists that he needs no more than 50 workers and has come up with a detailed plan to prove it. Gens rips it up, but is unable to convince Weiskopf that the needs of the families outweigh his more sensible business plans. Kittel arrives, inquiring about Gens's intentions for the theatre space, and Weiskopf grows desperate, demanding his meeting with Göring. Dessler, the chief of police, arrives with contraband confiscated from Weiskopf's room, and proceeds to beat him severely. Dessler drags Weiskopf off, and Kittel reveals to Gens that he reviewed Weiskopf's plans for 50 more workers earlier that morning, calling it brilliant, but because Gens showed a stronger will, Kittel allowed him to prevail. Kittel describes to Gens a new doctrine of mutual responsibility to be enacted in the ghetto, so as to dissuade anyone from escaping and joining the Underground: if anyone disappears, his family will be killed; if a family disappears, all who shared their room, etc. Kittel then demands to see what the actors have been working on.

The actors' Final Performance begins. They are dressed in Nazi uniforms, with Srulik wearing Hitler's uniform. He asks his fellow Nazis how they may detect Jews, and with each response his Dummy represents the "inhuman" qualities of the Jew. When they stab the Dummy's stomach, coins spill out instead of blood, proving the "Jewish creature" is not human after all. The Nazi uniforms poison the Dummy/Jew, and Srulik/Hitler proclaims the beginning of a new age of freedom. They celebrate by singing 'Ode to Joy'.

Kittel applauds their performance as excellent satire, and demands to see Hayyah, saying he heard her voice during the performance. But she is not there, having escaped the ghetto earlier. Kittel is furious, and orders the actors to line up with their backs to him. He calls out for the machine gunner, but instead Gens comes onstage carrying a heavy cart filled with jam and bread, deliberately sounding similar to a machine gun to fool the actors into thinking they are going to be killed. Kittel turns them around, laughing at the success of his joke. He applauds their performance and offers them the bread and jam. The Dummy sings an uplifting song as the actors enjoy their meal. Kittel moves away from them, cocks his schmeisser, and guns them down, including Gens, in one long round. Srulik remains unharmed, and his Dummy frees itself from his hold; it approached Kittel as an independent person and sings the last verse of the song, before Kittel guns it down too. The bullets that destroy the Dummy wound Srulik's arm as well, and he becomes the old one-armed Narrator from the beginning of the play, saying "Our last performance? Our last performance...Wait a moment..."

== Characters ==
Srulik – the narrator, whose memory of the last days of the ghetto serve as the crux of the story. He is the artistic director of the ghetto theatre and a ventriloquist, who is never seen without his wise-cracking dummy.

Jacob Gens – Chief of the Jewish police and later Head of the ghetto. A deeply conflicted man who always does his best to save the lives that he can, even if it means working with the Nazis and letting some die so that others may live. He has a good working relationship with Kittel, who sees him as his protégé. This allows Gens to arrange for lives to spared that might not be otherwise. He is deeply patriotic and a Zionist.

Bruno Kittel – the SS commander in charge of the ghetto. He is a paradox – he is vicious in his treatment of the residents, but has an artistic and sensitive side and is often seen carrying his saxophone case along with his schmeisser.

Hayyah – a former singer, who is admired by Kittel for her excellent voice and haunting beauty. Srulik and Kruk also harbor romantic feelings for her, but neither are given the chance to act on them

Weiskopf – an entrepreneur and former factory worker, who ensures that a new workshop for mending Nazi uniforms is established in the ghetto. He is selfish and power-hungry, and only interested in making a name for himself among the ghetto leadership.

Hermann Kruk – the librarian of the ghetto and a socialist. He is working on a chronicle of life in the ghetto and rarely sets foot outside the library, preferring to ensure that the events taking place around him are preserved for posterity. The character is based on a real person, also named Herman Kruk, whose diaries chronicled life in the Vilna ghetto. In the 2000 Seattle Public Theater production, director Lauren Marshall created a second lead female character by recasting Kruk as the female Hannah Kruk, thus introducing a degree of sexual tension into (her) relationship with Gens and Dr. Paul.

Dr. Ernst Paul – a professor of Judaica at the Rosenberg Institute for the Study of Judaism without Jews. He is focused on "preserving the Jewish culture" before the inevitable destruction of their race, and forces Kruk to help him catalog Vilna's cultural treasures. He is played by the same actor who plays Kittel.

Numerous minor characters that may be played each by individuals or by an ensemble as small as 15, including

the Hasid – a fortune teller

Ooma and Judith – actresses

3 actors – playing ghetto citizens and numerous stage roles

Elia Geivish

Yitzhok Geivish

Yankel Polikanski – 3 young black marketeers who are hanged for murdering the Hasid

Dessler – a Jewish ghetto policeman and later head of the Jewish police

A small musical ensemble is also required, at least including 2 violins, accordion, trumpet, clarinet, guitar and percussion. A bass, a trombone and a clarinet may be added to the ensemble.

== Music ==
The play incorporates traditional Jewish songs with jazz numbers and other traditional songs, all performed live on the stage by the actors and the musical ensemble.

Act I

- Unter dayne vayse shtern (German: Unter deinen weissen sternen) (In the sky the Stars All Glisten) – Hayyah
- Hot zich mir di shich zerissn (Someone Stole My Overcoat) – Dummy, Srulik and Hayyah
- Haikin's Tango^{1} – Band
- Vei zu di teg (A Curse on the Day) – Ensemble
- Swanee^{2} – Hayyah
- Shtiler, shtiler (Go to Sleep My Little Flower) – Ensemble
- Lullaby – Ooma

Act II

- Yidishe brigades – Helena, Ensemble
- Isrulik – Elia, Gevish
- Shtiler, Shtiler (Reprise) – Judith, Ooma
- Friling (German: Frühling) (Springtime) – Hayyah
- Je t'aime, c'est fou – Hayyah
- Mir lebn eibik (We'll live forever) – Hayyah
- Dremlen feigl (Birds Are Dreaming in the Treetops) – Hayyah
- May Day Song – Hayyah
- Zog nit keinmol (Never Say the Final Journey is at Hand) – Hayyah and Ensemble
- The Final Performance – Ensemble, Band
- Ode to Joy^{3} – Ensemble, Band
- Pak Zich Ain (Move Along) – Dummy

All songs arranged by Joshua Stephen Kartes, unless otherwise noted

^1 Composed by Joshua Stephen Kartes
^2 By George and Ira Gershwin
^3 By Ludwig van Beethoven
