= Jacob Gens =

Jewish head of the Vilnius Ghetto (1903–1943)

- Born: 1 April 1903; Ilgviečiai, Russian Empire
- Died: 14 September 1943 (aged 40); Vilnius, German-occupied Lithuania
- Cause of death: Execution by shooting
- Known for: Head of the Jewish Ghetto Police of the Vilna Ghetto; Head of the Vilnius Ghetto

Jacob Gens (Note: Sometimes given as Yakov Gens, Jakovas (Jokūbas) Gensas) (1 April 1903 – 14 September 1943) was the head of the Judenrat and Jewish Ghetto Police of the Vilna Ghetto. Originally from a merchant family, he joined the Lithuanian Army shortly after the independence of Lithuania, rising to the rank of captain while also securing a college degree in law and economics. He married a non-Jew and worked several jobs as a teacher, accountant, and administrator.

When Germany invaded Lithuania, Gens headed the Jewish hospital in Vilnius before the formation of the ghetto in September 1941. He was appointed chief of the ghetto police force, and in July 1942, the Germans appointed him head of the ghetto Jewish government. He attempted to secure better conditions in the ghetto and believed that it was possible to save some Jews by working for the Germans. Gens and his policemen helped Germans in rounding up the Jews for deportation and execution in the Ponary massacre in October–December 1941 and in liquidating several smaller ghettos from late 1942 to early 1943. His policies, including the attempt to save some Jews by surrendering others for deportation or execution, continue to be a subject of debate and controversy.

Gens was shot by the Gestapo on 14 September 1943 shortly before the ghetto was liquidated and most of the residents were sent either to labor camps or to execution at an extermination camp. His Lithuanian wife and daughter escaped the Gestapo and survived the war.

== Early life ==
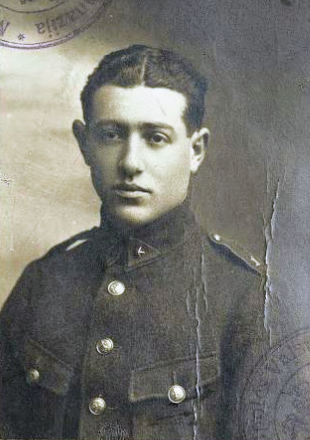
J. Gens in his high school diploma photo, Marijampolė, Lithuania, 14 December 1922

Gens was born on 1 April 1903 in Ilgviečiai near Šiauliai in what was then the Russian Empire and is now Lithuania. His father was a merchant and Gens was the oldest of four sons. Gens attended a Russian-language primary school and then a secondary school in Šiauliai. He was fluent in Lithuanian, Russian, German, and Yiddish, and knew some Hebrew, Polish, and English. In November 1920, he volunteered for the Lithuanian Army and was sent to study at the War School of Kaunas. N. Karni, who was a cadet with Gens, said that he "had great personal charm. I do not remember him ever being in a bad mood." Karni also felt Gens had "leadership qualities, he had personality, he was a man of principles". Upon graduation in December 1921, he was promoted to lieutenant and assigned to the 1st Infantry Regiment. In January 1925, he was promoted to senior lieutenant, and in March 1925, he requested to be transferred into the army reserves.

Gens then moved to Jurbarkas to teach physical education and the Lithuanian language at a Jewish school. In 1924, Gens married Elvyra Budreikaitė, a non-Jewish Lithuanian. He appears to have wanted to transfer from the infantry into the Lithuanian Air Force, but at the time it was accepting only unmarried men. The couple had a daughter, Ada, in 1926, and moved to Kaunas the following year. There Gens worked as an accountant at the Ministry of Justice from 1927 to 1935. He studied at Kaunas University and graduated in 1935 with a degree in law and economics. He worked for the Shell Oil Corporation for two years from 1935, then took a job with Lietūkis, a Lithuanian co-operative. In October 1938, he joined the Lithuanian Riflemen's Union and a month later was promoted to reserve captain.

Gens was a Zionist, and was a follower of the Revisionist Zionism school, which called for most European Jews to immediately emigrate to create the State of Israel in what were then the League of Nations mandates of Palestine and Trans-Jordan. He belonged to Brith ha-Hayal, a Jewish organization for military reservists.

== Administrator of Jewish hospital ==
After the occupation of Lithuania by the Soviet Union and the formation of the Lithuanian Soviet Socialist Republic in July 1940, Gens was fired from his job. He was unable to secure a work permit, nor was he allowed to continue to live in Kaunas. He went to live with his brother, Solomon, in Vilnius, and although Gens was on a list to be sent to Soviet labor camps, he managed to secure an unregistered job at the Vilnius health department through an old military colleague, Colonel Juozas Ūsas. Gens was not on the official payroll, which meant that the political officer attached to the hospital did not need to be informed of his employment. During June 1941, when thousands of the Lithuanians were exiled to Siberia, (Note: They were declared to be "unreliable elements" by the Soviet regime.) Gens remained in hiding and was not deported.

The German Army entered Vilnius on 24 June 1941, as part of their invasion of Russia in World War II. After their arrival, Gens was put in charge of the Jewish hospital. The occupying authorities ordered the creation of the Judenrat, or Jewish Council, with community-selected members. In early September 1941, the Germans murdered most of the Judenrat, which left the Jewish community leaderless before and during the relocation of the Jews into two ghettos in Vilnius. During this period, the hospital sheltered several prominent Jews from Vilnius. When the ghettos were formed, the Jewish hospital was included within the confines of the larger ghetto, an unusual arrangement for a Nazi-period ghetto. Most ghettos were organized to exclude any Jewish hospitals, forcing the inhabitants to either do without a hospital or set up a makeshift one.

== Chief of the Vilnius Ghetto police ==
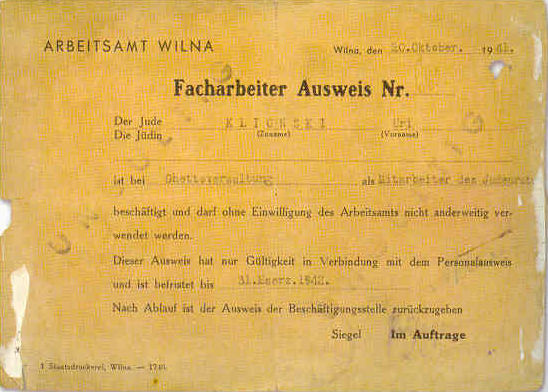
A faded work permit for Uri Elichski, a Jewish worker in the Vilnius Ghetto (October 1941)

In September 1941, Gens was named the commander of the Jewish Ghetto Police for the Vilnius Ghetto by the head of the new Judenrat, Anatol Friend. (Note: Sometimes spelled Fried or Fryd.) Officially, the duties of Gens and his policemen were to carry out German and Judenrat orders and provide law enforcement for the inhabitants of the ghetto. Included in their first duty, and considered by the occupiers as the single most important task, was the uncovering of any anti-German activity in the ghetto.

The police force comprised around 200 men at the start, and Gens appointed Salk Dessler as his deputy commandant. Other chief subordinates included Joseph Muszkat and Meir Levas. Dessler was a Revisionist Zionist, and Muszkat and Levas had been members of the Betar, the youth movement of the Revisionist Zionists. The police force included many other former Betar members, and this may have been because Gens favored people coming from his own political leanings. This led to a conflict with the Bund, another Jewish political group. (Note: The Bund, which was a socialist party, opposed Zionism and while wanting Jewish national autonomy was against the emigration of Jews from Europe.) The Bund appears to have wanted the police force to be more of a militia, with Gens and his supporters wishing it to be a more conventional police force. After some initial political wrangling, Gens' faction won, but the Bundists remained strong in the Judenrat.

=== Aktions of 1941 ===
The smaller ghetto was liquidated in mid-October 1941, (Note: The estimated 6000 to 8000 remaining residents were chased to Ponary where they were killed.) which left the larger one. From late October to December 1941, the ghetto was subject to Aktions, selections of people for deportation and execution in Ponary. Gens was afraid that the actions of the Germans would result in a widespread massacre. He persuaded the Gestapo to let the Jewish police round up the deportees. Gens, backed by the Jewish police force, was responsible for deciding who was to be sent for resettlement and execution. In October, this brought him into conflict with the ghetto's rabbis, who argued Gens was acting against Jewish law. Gens disagreed and considered it to be lawful to sacrifice some people to save others.

During the deportations, he tried to secure more work permits from the Germans, but they refused to issue them. He attempted to protect those he could. During the Aktion on 3–5 November, in which the paperwork of everyone in the ghetto was checked, holders of work passes – which allowed the holder to protect a spouse and only two children under 16 – were checked, and anyone not listed on someone's work permit was sent to Ponary. At one point, while Gens was checking permits, a family with three children went through the checkpoint, and Gens pulled aside the third child. Shortly afterwards, a family with only one child passed through the checkpoint. Gens began berating the father for losing track of his second child and pushed the third child from the first family into the second family. This incident took place under the supervision of German officials, who did not intervene.

All those removed from the ghetto were taken to Ponary, where they were killed. The last deportation took place on 21 December 1941, leaving between 12,500 and 17,200 residents in the ghetto. Of those, about 3,000 were "illegal", or residents without a work permit. (Note: Most of those without permits were able to secure them during 1942.) At least 60,000 Jews had lived in Vilnius when the German occupation began.

Gens and the Judenrat in the larger ghetto were aware of the executions in Ponary by the end of September 1941, when survivors began returning to the ghetto. The survivors, some of them wounded and all of them female, were mostly brought to Gens, and perhaps to the Judenrat, to whom they relayed their stories. Gens urged them to keep quiet, and some of the wounded were kept in the hospital to prevent them from repeating their stories. Knowledge of the massacres at Ponary became common in the ghetto by late December 1941 or early January 1942.

=== Relations with the Judenrat ===
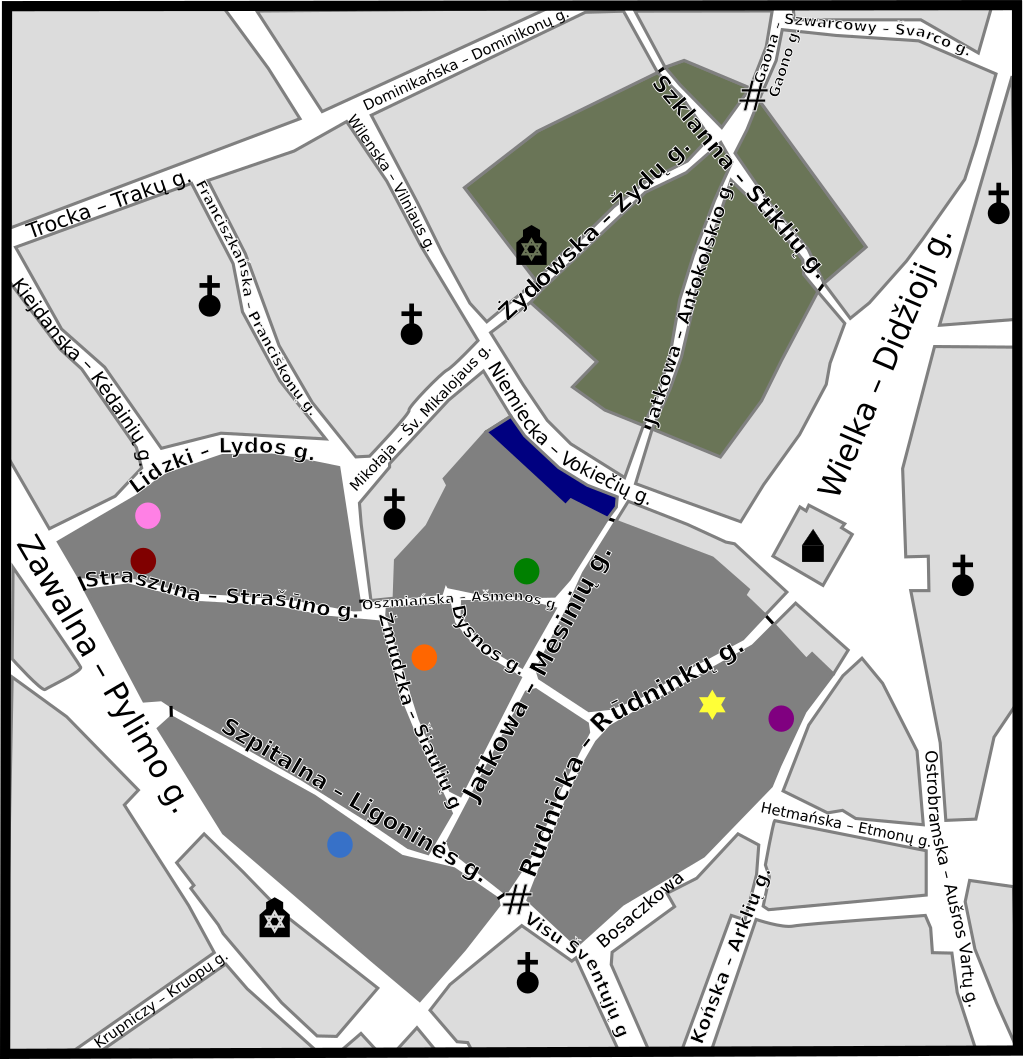
Map of the Vilna Ghetto (the small ghetto in olive green; Judenrat marked with yellow Star of David; Jewish hospital with blue dot)

After the Aktions in late 1941, no further large-scale deportations or other massacres took place in the Vilnius Ghetto. This period of calm lasted throughout 1942 and early 1943. During this period, Gens' department oversaw the three police precincts the ghetto had been divided into, as well as the ghetto's prison. The police force in early 1942 had about 200 policemen.

During early 1942, Gens became involved in a power struggle with the head of the Judenrat, Anatol Friend. Friend had not been involved in Vilnius' Jewish organizations prior to the German invasion, and did not have much support from the ghetto's inhabitants. Gens was viewed favorably by the ghetto residents, partly because he lived in the ghetto when he could have escaped. Over time, Gens and the police force encroached on the functions of the Judenrat. The Germans backed Gens' efforts to secure more power, and implied that he was not responsible to the Judenrat, and that the Judenrat had no power over Gens or the Jewish policemen.

In February, the Germans allowed the Judenrat to set up a judicial system. Before this, justice was administered solely by Gens and his policemen; after this, Gens' department still retained some judicial functions over injuries to policemen, escapes from jail, or leaving the ghetto without leave. In June 1942, Gens took the responsibility for carrying out the death sentence imposed on five men from the ghetto who had been convicted of murder. A sixth man, convicted of committing a murder in another ghetto, was hanged at the same time. (Note: The sixth man was an informer for the Germans and was responsible for the death of 60 people from the Vilnius Ghetto who had escaped.) Some residents accused the Jewish police force of taking bribes at the gates leading into the ghetto. The police also organized parties, which were occasionally attended by the Gestapo.

Gens had a dispute with a tailor named Weisskopf, who ran a tailoring workshop in the ghetto. Weisskopf tried to increase his own power base by negotiating directly with the German Army and not going through the ghetto's Labor Department. When Gens ordered all work contracts to go through the Labor Department, Weisskopf appealed to his German contacts, but the Gebeitskommissar of Vilnius, Hans Hingst, preferred that control of such contracts go through his own office, which worked through the ghetto's administration. Hingst thus ruled in Gens' favor. The ghetto police then searched Weisskopf's house, found contraband, arrested him, and jailed him for four days, after which he lost his position running the workshop.

Gens also came into conflict with the Judenrat and Friend over the Jewish policemen who guarded the gates into the ghetto. The Germans allowed the Jewish policemen to control access to the ghetto and conduct searches for contraband. Gens' policy was that when no Germans were present at the gates, the policemen would do minimal searches and would allow the smuggling of food and other necessary items. If Germans were present at the gates, the policemen conducted thorough searches and often beat up attempted smugglers. In Gens' view, if the Germans thought the Jewish policemen were not vigilant enough, the policemen would be replaced by German guards, and any opportunity for smuggling would cease. He also claimed that even when the Germans were present, any confiscated items were brought into the ghetto, (Note: Confiscated items were sometimes returned to the smuggler and sometimes went to the public kitchens providing food to the needy.) which would not be the case if there were German guards at the gates.

== Head of the Vilnius Ghetto ==
On 10 July 1942, the Judenrat of the Vilnius Ghetto was dissolved by Franz Murer, the German deputy for Jewish Affairs, for incompetence and ineffectiveness. Gens was appointed as head of the ghetto; he retained his position as chief of the Jewish police force, and took the title of "chief of the ghetto and police in Vilnius". (Note: Historians have given Gens' title in several ways. Raul Hilberg says that he was "Ghetto Representative". Deborah Dwork and Robert Jan van Pelt call him the "Elder" of the ghetto. Yitzhak Arad calls him "Jewish council chairman".) Dessler was named Gens' deputy for police functions, and Friend was Gens' deputy for administration. Gens asked the rest of the Judenrat to remain in the administration as heads of the various ghetto departments, which they did.

=== Views and policies ===
Inhabitants of the ghetto referred to Gens derisively as "King Jacob the First". The historian Lucy Dawidowicz describes him as one of a group of "strong, even dictatorial" leaders who were "the policy and decision makers in their ghettos, the strategical thinkers on the ghetto's possibilities for survival". Gens thought that labor would provide a way for the inhabitants to survive. Along with several other ghetto leaders, he hoped to preserve some of the ghetto inhabitants and outlast the Nazi occupation. Historian Michael Marrus describes Gens' leadership style as "intensely authoritarian" and Marrus argues that Gens came to "believe that [he] alone could save a portion of the ghetto inmates". This belief has made Gens a controversial figure both at the time and to this day. He sought to save at least some of the population by working for the Germans, and to do that, he relied on the police force. As part of his efforts to secure support, he held a "political club" of sorts in his home, bringing together some of the community leaders for colloquia to discuss Jewish history, recent events, and the fate of the Jews.

=== Liquidation of smaller ghettos ===
In July 1942, the Germans ordered Gens to give up 500 children and old people, but by late July, he had persuaded the Germans to abandon the order for children to be surrendered. He reduced the entire command to 100 older residents, and on 26 July, handed over 84 elderly, mostly terminally ill or disabled, who were then executed by the Nazis. The Jewish administration employed over 1500 people in September 1942, including some intellectuals who were appointed to jobs to ensure their survival. This suggestion was made by community leaders and approved by Gens.

In late 1942, the Germans consolidated some small ghettos in the Vilnius region with Gens' help. These included the ghettos at Oszmiana, Švenčionys, Soly, and Michaliszki. During one of these consolidations, on 25 October, Gens gave up 400 old people in return for saving the remaining 600 Jewish residents of Oszmiana. He bribed Martin Weiss, commander of the Ponary killing squad, to accept the lower quota. The Jewish police from Vilnius, as well as some Lithuanians, were forced to kill the 400 Jews. One ghetto diarist claimed that the Vilnius ghetto was outraged by Gens' participation in the killings, but other diarists stated that most ghetto inhabitants approved of Gens' choice to save some. By April 1943, most of these small ghettos were gone, with their inhabitants either moved to labor camps, shot, or moved to the Vilnius Ghetto. On 4–5 April, the last inhabitants were loaded into trains under the supervision of the Vilnius Jewish police, and the police accompanied the trains, which passed through Vilnius on their way to Ponary. Gens joined his policemen when the train went through Vilnius and was arrested along with them when the train arrived at Ponary. Gens and the policemen were released, but the other Jews on the train were executed. It appears that the Germans misled Gens about the destination of the trains. Gens justified the participation of the Vilnius ghetto police in these roundups by claiming that their participation saved at least some of the ghetto residents when otherwise the Germans would have shot them all.

=== Relations with Jewish resistance ===
Gens' relations with the various Jewish resistance groups were strained. He allowed some resistance members to escape the ghetto, but opposed the plans for resistance because he felt they would threaten the entire ghetto's existence. Gens promised to provide aid to the resistance groups and may have promised to join them in a revolt if the time was right. He did provide money, taken from the various Judenrat funds, to the Fareynikte Partizaner Organizatsye (FPO), a resistance group in the ghetto. Because of the need for secrecy, the FPO did not have a way to directly solicit money from the ghetto inhabitants. Gens provided funds to another resistance group, the "Struggle Group" established by Boris 'Borka' Fridman. It later merged with the "Yechiel Group", established by Yechiel Sheinbaum, to form the "Yechiel's Struggle Group". He provided a pistol to the Struggle Group, its first. The FPO tried to prevent the formation of other resistance groups in the ghetto, mainly because they feared that it would increase the chances of German discovery as well as competition for scarce resources. Gens' support for the Struggle Group appears to have led to friction between himself and the FPO.

On 26 June 1943, Gens ordered the arrest of Josef Glazman, who had previously worked for Gens but was now a leader of the FPO. Glazman was arrested but, while being escorted towards a labor camp, was freed by a group of FPO members. Gens then negotiated with the FPO and secured Glazman's rearrest in return for assurances of Glazman's safety.

In July 1943, Oberscharführer Bruno Kittel demanded that Gens hand over Yitzhak Wittenberg, a leader of the FPO. Although Wittenberg was arrested, he was freed by FPO members. Gens' reaction to this was to spread the word that unless Wittenberg turned himself in, the Germans would destroy the ghetto. The ghetto residents supported Gens in this dispute. On 16 July, Wittenberg turned himself in. What happened next is unclear: some sources report that Wittenberg committed suicide while in custody, possibly with a cyanide pill provided by Gens; others state that Wittenberg was poisoned by Gens then turned over to the Gestapo, or that he was tortured to death by the Gestapo and given a cyanide pill by Gens' second-in-command.

=== Welfare and cultural efforts ===
While Gens was in control of the ghetto, he continued to oversee the sanitary and health efforts in the ghetto, running that part of the ghetto administration like a military operation. Although conditions were very crowded and often unsanitary, the ghetto never suffered a major epidemic, and there were fewer deaths due to disease than in other ghettos. A network of children's homes was set up in March 1942 on Gens' orders. These homes were for orphans or those with parents who could not care properly for them. A department of the ghetto administration was in charge of supervising bosses who employed children under the age of 16.

In May 1942, Gens secured German permission for residents of the ghetto to sell belongings or property they left with gentiles outside the ghetto. The proceeds were to be split half and half between the Jewish owners and the Germans. In practice, the Germans often kept more than half the value, but it still allowed ghetto residents to receive some value for the property they no longer controlled. Then, in October 1942, the Germans allowed the Jewish ghetto police to retrieve Jewish property left with others outside the ghetto and bring it back to the ghetto. In the same month, Gens set up a program to collect, repair, and redistribute winter clothing. The clothes were donated by ghetto residents, repaired in workshops in the ghetto, and then given to the poor and needy. The effort was credited with helping many of the poorest residents survive the winter of 1942–1943.

Gens started a theater in the ghetto, where poetry readings as well as the production of new and old plays took place. Gens continued the policy of supporting the ghetto library, and in March 1943 he ordered that all ghetto residents should turn their privately owned books over to the library, except for textbooks and prayer books. (Note: After the liquidation of the ghetto, the library volumes were used to heat furnaces.) He also set up a ghetto publishing house. Nothing was ever published, but the authors were paid for their manuscripts. An archive of historical documents relating to the ghetto was set up. The ghetto had a symphony orchestra, the formation of which owed some impetus to Gens and his police force. Gens justified these cultural activities by claiming that the Jewish administration "wanted to give man the chance to be free of the ghetto for a few hours, and we succeeded in this. Our days here are harsh and grim. Our body is here in the ghetto, but they have not broken our spirit."

== Personal privileges and family ==
Gens' wife and daughter at first went to Kaunas, but after the formation of the ghetto, they returned to Vilnius and lived near the ghetto's perimeter. His wife used her maiden name rather than Gens'. According to Leonard Tushnet, there were unfounded rumors that the couple had divorced. Gens did not refute the rumors, as he thought they would help protect his family. Other sources state that the two were divorced to protect Elvyra and Ada. Elvyra Gens was opposed to her husband taking a leading role in the government of the ghetto and urged him to "pass" as a Lithuanian. It is not clear exactly why Gens went into the ghetto, but in a letter to his wife, Gens said "This is the first time in my life that I have to engage in such duties. My heart is broken. But I shall always do what is necessary for the sake of the Jews in the ghetto."

Gens' mother and a brother, Solomon, were both imprisoned in the Vilnius Ghetto. Another brother, Ephraim, was head of the ghetto police in the Šiauliai Ghetto, and was the only Gens brother to survive the Holocaust. (Note: Ephraim was deported to Dachau concentration camp after March 1944 until the camp was liberated in April 1945. One of Ephraim's daughters also survived the Holocaust.)

The Germans allowed Gens some privileges not accorded to other Vilnius Jews. He was not required to wear the yellow badge of the Star of David on the front and back of his clothes; instead, he wore a white and blue armband with the Star of David. He was allowed to enter and leave the ghetto at any time, and his daughter was not required to live in the ghetto, even though other half-Jews were confined within the ghetto. Gens and the Jewish policemen were allowed to carry pistols. (Note: Gens is known to have killed at least two Jews by shooting them.)

== Death ==
On 13 September, the Germans ordered Gens to report to the Gestapo headquarters on the following day. He was urged to flee but chose to go, telling others that if he fled "thousands of Jews will pay for it with their lives". Gens was shot by Obersturmfuhrer Rolf Neugebauer, head of the Vilnius Gestapo, on 14 September 1943. The Gestapo said that he was killed for funneling money to the FPO. Dessler was named as Gens' successor as ghetto chief, but was soon replaced with a council which included Friend and Gens' brother, Solomon.

The ghetto was liquidated between 22 and 24 September 1943. Three thousand six hundred residents went to labor camps (including 2,000 sent to labor camps in Vilnius); 5,000 women and children went to Majdanek, where they were gassed to death; and a few hundred elderly and sick were sent to Ponary and shot. The few Jews who remained in Vilnius were shot just before the Soviet Army arrived. A few FPO members escaped to the nearby forests.

Gens' wife and daughter were living near the ghetto on the day he was shot. A Jewish policeman informed them that Gens had been shot and that the Gestapo was looking for them. They fled and managed to stay in hiding until Soviet troops arrived. In 1945, they obtained papers for repatriation to Poland. From there they moved to West Germany as Jewish aliyah. They emigrated to Australia in 1948 and to the United States in 1953.

== Legacy ==
The role of the Judenrats has been controversial. Both Raul Hilberg and Hannah Arendt, early historians of the Holocaust, argued that without the help of the Judenrats, the Germans would have been hampered in their extermination efforts. Arendt went further and condemned those Jews who served as leaders in the ghettos for helping destroy their own people. More recent historians have recognized that the situation facing the Jewish leaders was more complex – they faced conflicting sets of goals and had essentially no power to change the demands the Germans made of them.

Gens himself has been called "one of the most controversial Jewish ghetto leaders". Chaim Lazar, a member of the FPO, wrote of Gens that "It may be charged that his course was harmful, but everyone knows that he was never a traitor. All that he did during his tenure as Chief of the Ghetto was for his people". Yitzhak Arad, in his history of the Vilnius Ghetto, says that Gens "erred in his fundamental conception – that the German administration regarded the existence of the ghetto and its inhabitants vital for economic reasons" and that "the policy laid down by Jacob Gens was the only one that afforded hope and some prospect of survival". Vadim Altskan, of the United States Holocaust Memorial Museum, states that "... Holocaust historiography treated people such as ... Jacob Gens ... as instruments of destruction in the hands of the Nazi killing machine. ... Applied retrospectively, these charges for the most part are judgmental and add very little to our understanding of the events. Neither Jewish functionaries nor 'ordinary' Jews had any practical or psychological experience in dealing with the grim reality of the Nazi occupation, because never before in their long history of persecution had the Jews experienced an assault of such magnitude and careful design." Regarding the charge of collaborating with the Germans, Dawidowicz opined, "to say that [Gens and others like him] 'cooperated' or 'collaborated' with the Germans is semantic confusion and historical misrepresentation". The Israeli Zionist poet Nathan Alterman investigated the history of the Vilnius Ghetto, including interviewing survivors such as Abba Kovner, and stated "Had I been in the ghetto, I would have been on the side of the Judenrat."

Gens is one of the main characters in Joshua Sobol's plays Ghetto and Adam. They depict him as a complex, morally ambiguous character forced to choose between two evils.
