= Jewish response to The Forty Days of Musa Dagh =

Novel by Franz Werfel

The Forty Days of Musa Dagh is a 1933 novel by the Austrian-Jewish author Franz Werfel. Based on the events at Musa Dagh in 1915 during the Armenian genocide in the Ottoman Empire, the book played a role in organizing the Jewish resistance under Nazi rule. It was passed from hand to hand in Jewish ghettos in Nazi-occupied Europe, and it became an example and a symbol for the Jewish underground throughout Europe. The Holocaust scholars Samuel Totten, Paul Bartrop and Steven L. Jacobs underline the importance of the book for many of the ghettos' Jews: "The book was read by many Jews during World War II and was viewed as an allegory of their own situation in the Nazi-established ghettos, and what they might do about it."

The book was also read by many young Jews in Eretz Yisrael, and they discussed it while preparing to defend Haifa against a possible Nazi invasion. Prof. Peter Medding of Hebrew University of Jerusalem writes: "Between the wars, Franz Werfel's popular novel, The Forty Days of Musa Dagh, had a profound effect on young Jews in Palestine and in the European ghettos" Yair Auron, an Israeli historian, says that "Werfel's book shocked millions throughout the world and influenced many young people who grew up in Eretz Yisrael in the 1930s. For many Jewish youth in Europe, "Musa Dagh" became a symbol, a model, and an example, especially during the dark days of the Second World War." Jews who read the book believed that the novel, though speaking about the Armenians, contained many allusions to Judaism and Israel in relation to Werfel's own beliefs, and it had a profound impact upon many of them. Auron cites a quotation from Forty Days of Musa Dagh which reads, "To be an Armenian is an impossibility" as reminiscent of a similar circumstance that Jews faced during that era.

Auron states that readers of Musa Dagh will have a difficult time believing that the book was written before the Holocaust. Lionel Bradley Steiman writes:

In hindsight, the book appears an almost uncanny adumbration of aspects of the later Nazi Holocaust in which the Jews of Europe perished.

The Nazi propaganda machine also recognized the parallels suggested by the book, and the book was burned along with other books that were not considered to have proper ideology.

Merrill D. Peterson mentions the review written by Louis Kronenberger in the New York Times Book Review, in which Kronenberger made the point that the book "was inferentially about the plight of the Jews in Germany even though the story concerned the Armenians." Merrill D. Peterson says that after the novel was published in Hebrew in 1934, "it was quickly taken up and recognized by Jewish youth in Europe and Palestine as "a Jewish book" - not because the author was Jewish but because it addressed the condition and the fate of the Jews under the Nazi peril."

Peter Balakian describes how the U.S. State Department under President Franklin D. Roosevelt (FDR) surrendered to the demands of Turkey and forced MGM to drop the project to make a film based on the novel and once again compares this event concerning the novel to the fate of the European Jews: "This was 1935. How much did FDR's State Department know about what Hitler was doing to the Jews of Europe, and how much did it care?"

== Jewish symbolism ==
Some Jews believed that the book The Forty Days of Musa Dagh was full of symbolism connected to Jewish history and Judaism. They used to say about the book: "Only a Jew could have written this work". Yair Auron writes that he has no doubts that Musa Dagh is Mount Moses. The book's title is The Forty Days of Musa Dagh although according to different documentary sources, the rebellion lasted for 36 days, or for 53 days, or 24 days. Apparently no source says forty days, and Auron believes that this number was chosen to symbolize the forty days of the Great Flood, or the forty days that it took Moses to ascend the mountain.

Writer and journalist Huberta von Voss says:

Werfel filters the true story of the Armenians' resistance through a Hebrew prism: the chronicle of the exodus. Forty days of resistance, forty years wandering in the desert. Werfel describes the exodus from Egypt, from fate-imposed passivity. The social order in his novel is extracted from the Torah with a firm gouge. One a political leader, the other, a spiritual leader, they guide the fighting chosen people: of course, they are Moses, the prophet, and Aaron, the high priest.

Ms. von Voss also makes a parallel between the hero of the novel Gabriel, which means "hero of God" and Moses in the Bible. They both grew up as strangers to their people.

Auron sees "clear analogies" between the fate of Gabriel of Musa Dagh and that of Moses. Gabriel died on top of Musa Dagh, and never saw his people being saved by French ships. Moses died on top of Mount Nebo, forty years after the Exodus in which he led the Israelites out of Egyptian's slavery, and just before his people reached The Promised Land.

== Impact in Eretz Yisrael ==
During World war II, the Jewish Community in the British Mandate for Palestine feared a Nazi invasion led by Erwin Rommel. Some argued they had no choice but to surrender. Others said they should fight, and Mount Carmel was chosen to rally the Jewish forces. This plan received different names, one of them being "The Musa Dagh Plan"; a leader of the Haganah stated because "We want to turn Mount Carmel into the 'Musa Dagh' of Palestinian Jewry." One of the members of the Jewish community remembers this time: "I will never forget that patrol. We marched from Ahuza along the Carmel ridge. The moon smiled down on us with its round face. I imagined to myself the Jewish Musa Dagh which was to ensure the future of the Yishuv, and guarantee its honor. We put our faith in the power of endurance of the Jewish 'Musa Dagh' and we were determined to hold out for at least three or four months." Yisrael Galili, a Chief of Staff of the Haganah, wrote to his wife: "On the way, we reexamined and elaborated on the idea of Haifa-Tobruk. Or perhaps Haifa-Masada-Musa Dagh? In any case the idea is exciting."

== Impact on resistance forces and Jewish ghetto culture ==
While in Eretz Yisrael, the plan to resist a possible Nazi invasion was compared to Masada, to Tobruk, and to Musa Dagh. The Jews from the ghettos talked about Musa Dagh more often than they did about Masada. To them, Masada was more a symbol of suicide than a symbol of a battle, while Musa Dagh was a symbol of rebellion.

Several records mention the impact that The Forty Days of Musa Dagh made on the Jews of Europe. One of these records is dated to 1943 in the Białystok Ghetto: "The only thing left is to see our ghetto as Musa Dagh." These words were used when the members of the underground Białystok Ghetto were debating whether they should try to escape to the forest or to remain in the ghetto and organize resistance. According to Auron, The Forty Days of Musa Dagh was one of the main factors in the decision not to abandon the elderly, but instead to stay in the ghetto and resist. The records from the Białystok Ghetto were buried in 1943, and recovered after the war; later they were published in a book named Pages from the Fire. The editors wrote that "because of the similarity between the fate of the two peoples, the Armenians and the Jews", Musa Dagh was extremely popular with the ghetto youth. Mordechaj Tannenbaum, an inmate of the Vilna Ghetto who was sent with others to organize resistance at Bialystok, wrote in a 1943 letter: "Musa Dagh is all the rage with us. If you read it, you will remember it for the rest of your life." The record of one of the meetings organizing the revolt suggests that the novel was often used in the ghettos as a reference for successful resistance: "Only one thing remains for us: to organize collective resistance in the ghetto, at any cost; to consider the ghetto our 'Musa Dagh', to write a proud chapter of Jewish Bialystok and our movement into history."

Haika Grossman, who in her youth was a partisan and a participant in the ghetto uprisings in Poland and Lithuania, said that Musa Dagh was popular with Jewish activists in Europe, was read and "passed from hand to hand":

The Forty Days of Musa Dagh, by Franz Werfel, which made an indelible impression on us. The bloody, ruthless massacre of over a million Armenians by the Turks in 1915 in full view of the entire world reminded us our fate .The Armenians were starved to death, shot, drowned, tortured to exhaustion. We compared their fate with ours, the indifference of the world to their plight, and the complete abandonment of the poor people into the hands of a barbarous, tyrannical regime.

Inka Wajbort, a young member of Hashomer Hatzair, described reading the book in the summer of 1941:

It completely captivated me. For four full days I was engrossed in the book and could not tear myself away .... I myself was at Musa Dagh; I was under siege. I was one of the Armenians doomed to death. If I lifted my eyes from the book, it was only to hear the cry — Mama, how could this be? The world knew and kept silent. It could not be that children in other countries at the same time went to school, women adorned themselves, men went about their business, as if nothing had happened .... And there, a people was annihilated.

A Jewish underground leader from Tchenstokhova remembered how he was given an assignment to go to "Konyestopol forest "with the purpose of organizing a 'Musa Dagh' there."

Pesya Mayevska describes the mood in one of Belorussia's ghettos:

There were those who turned their eyes towards Heaven. They were orthodox, put on tefillin [phylacteries] prayed three times a day and poured out the bitterness in their hearts before the Creator of the universe. Many looked for good literature. Franz Werfel's book. The Forty Days of Musa Dagh, passed from hand to hand, telling about the heroic revolt of a group of Armenians during the Turkish slaughters. Following that example the Jewish youth gathered arms, created an underground.

Later, after Mordechai Anielewicz, the leader of Żydowska Organizacja Bojowa (English: Jewish Combat Organization), during the Warsaw Ghetto Uprising came to the ghetto and described the extermination of Jews outside the ghetto walls to them, Wajbort reported thinking to herself: "And so again Musa Dagh? and again the world keeps silent?"

Itzhak Katzenelson who participated in the Warsaw Ghetto Uprising, and was later murdered in the Auschwitz concentration camp wrote to his younger brother:

When the Armenians were killed, they were mourned in a Jewish book; but when the Jewish People was killed, who will mourn for them?

German literary critic Marcel Reich-Ranicki, a survivor of the Warsaw Ghetto, wrote in his autobiography that Werfel's novel "enjoyed unexpected success in the ghetto, being passed from hand to hand."

According to testimony from the Warsaw Ghetto, Musa Dagh had a big impact on Janusz Korczak, a director of an orphanage for Jewish children. A member of Korczak's staff said that they discussed Musa Dagh in the summer of 1941 at one of their meetings. In particular they discussed the episode in which a pastor abandoned the children to save himself (in the book he later came back). During this discussion, Korczak said "that he would not under any circumstances be parted from his children" and he did not. He was offered sanctuary on the "Aryan side" by Żegota but turned it down repeatedly, saying that he could not abandon his children. He perished together with the children.

Emmanuel Ringelblum known for his Notes from the Warsaw Ghetto wrote:

What are people reading? This is a subject of general interest; after the war, it will intrigue the world. What, the world will ask, did people think of on Musa Dagh....

One more testimony comes from the Kladovo-Šabac group: "Like Jews throughout the world, from the ghettos of Eastern Europe to the pioneering settlements of Palestine, the Kladovo refugees (young and old) read The Forty Days of Musa Dagh by Franz Werfel and became enthralled by the story of Armenia's struggle against Turks during the First World War."

A member of the Dutch underground said about Musa Dagh: "It was a 'textbook' for us. It opened our eyes and spelled out for us what might happen, although we did not know what in fact would occur."

In a 1938 letter written from prison in Benito Mussolini's Italy, Vittorio Foa stated: "In a novel by Franz Werfel, The Forty Days of Musa Dagh, I found a pretty faithful description of what the treatment of Jews would be in Mitteleuropa".

== Jewish critics of the book ==
In 1933 Dov Kimchi wrote:

A people ravaged by 'sacred' suffering on the biblical pinnacle of tragedy, unparalleled in the twentieth century; but didn't that nation become dedicated to its agony, uplifted, sanctified by a new life, compelled into interpreting all these torments as a reward for suffering? Or, like those who suffer from their weakness, who wither away, their immolation neither shaking the planet nor turning the individuals or the people into Chosen Ones? It is a quintessential Jewish belief in being smoldered and sanctified by fire. This is a typical Jewish question which the Jewish poet has transposed to a different dimension, seeking answers among the Gentiles, since he will not seek them here, among his own people.

In a review published in 1934, R. Zilegman writes: "The book is very interesting for the educated reader in general, but the Jewish reader will find it of special interest. The fate of this Armenian tribe recalls, in several important details, the fate of the people of Israel, and not surprisingly the Jewish reader will discover several familiar motifs, so well known to him from the life and history of his people."

== See also ==
- Adolf Hitler's Armenian quote
