= Elektrit =

Coordinates: 54°40′38″N 25°16′1″E

- Industry: Manufacturing
- Founded: 1925
- Defunct: 1939
- Headquarters: Wilno, Second Republic of Poland
- Products: Radio receivers
- Revenue: US$1 million
- Number of employees: 1100

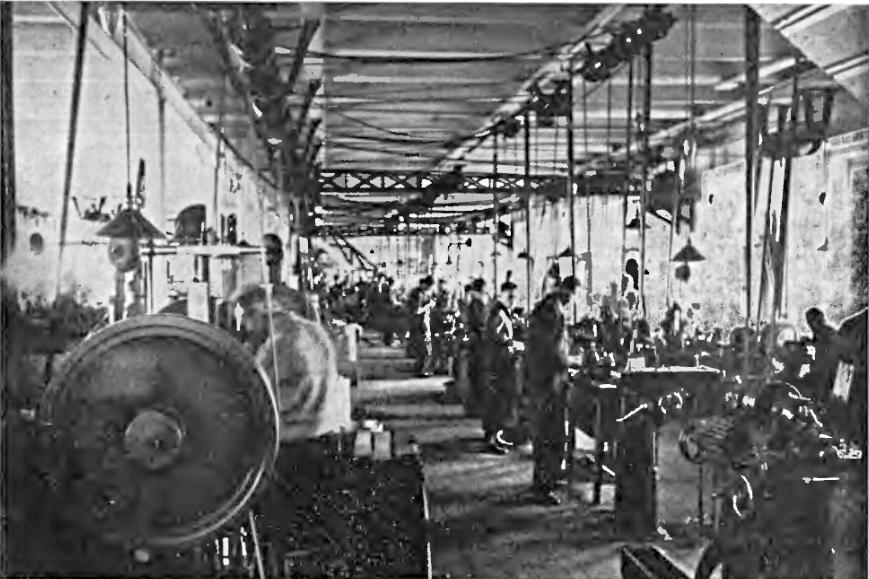
Elektrit factory in 1938

Elektrit Radiotechnical Society (Polish: Towarzystwo Radiotechniczne „ELEKTRIT”) was the largest privately owned company in Wilno, Second Republic of Poland (now Vilnius, Lithuania) (1925–39).

With over 1100 workers, the society produced approximately 50 thousand radio receivers annually. A large percentage of the production was exported abroad, mostly to Sweden, Germany, Czechoslovakia and Yugoslavia. The annual turnover exceeded US$1 million. Elektrit proved to be a very successful company and soon became a leading radio manufacturer in Poland.

Following the Soviet invasion of Poland in 1939, Wilno was occupied by the Soviet Union and the company was nationalized. In 1940 the factory was hastily dismantled and transported to Minsk, where the "Vyacheslav Molotov" Radio Factory was set up. After the war the plant was renamed Minsk Radio and Television Association "Horizont" (Horizon). It produced "Minsk" radio receivers, being copies of Polish pre-war models but with Soviet tube set.

The former Elektrit buildings in Vilnius were used for the Kailis forced labor camp during the German occupation and by a secret Soviet radio factory of the Ministry of Aviation Industry, known as PO Box 555.

== Gallery ==
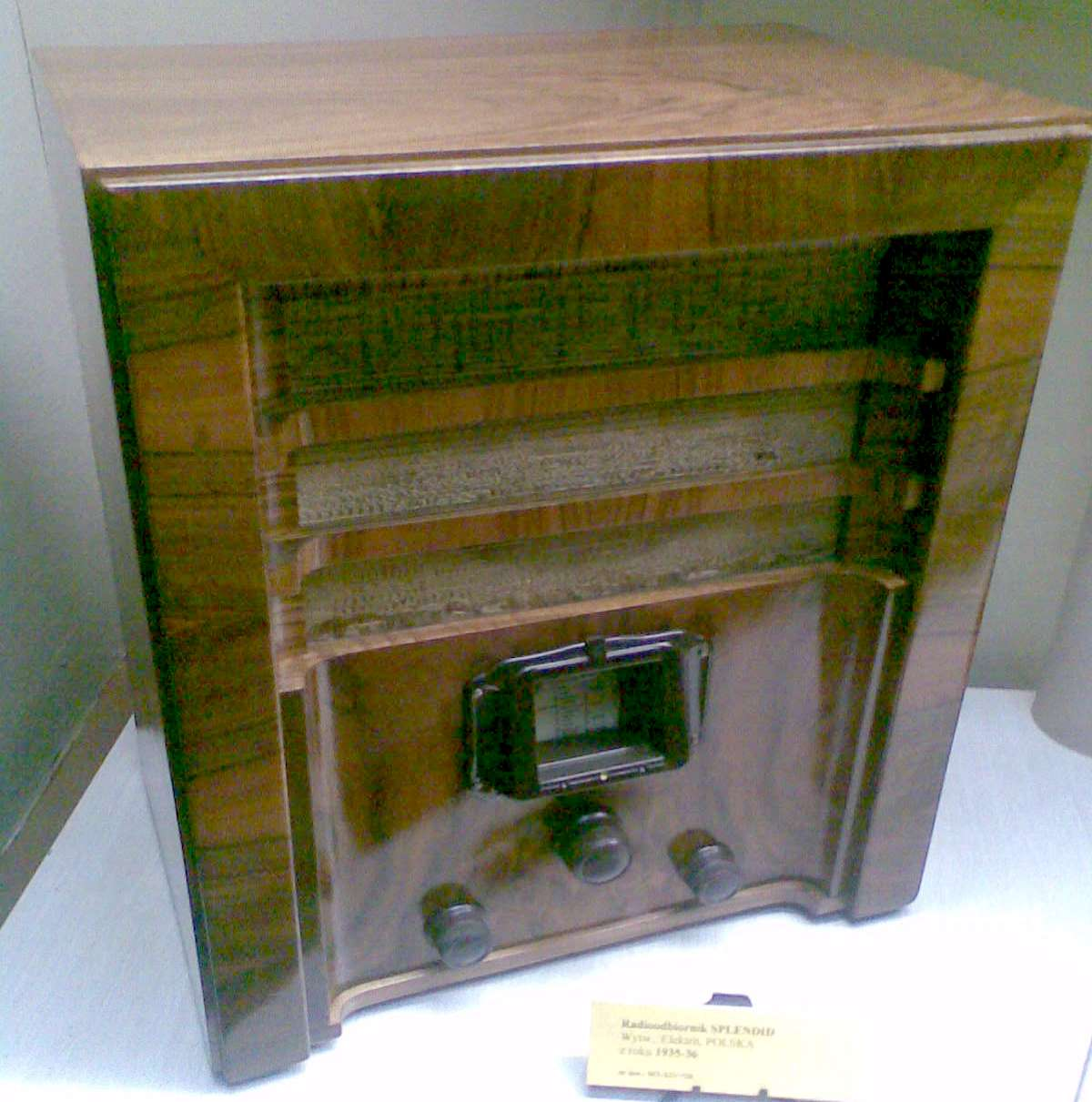
Splendid

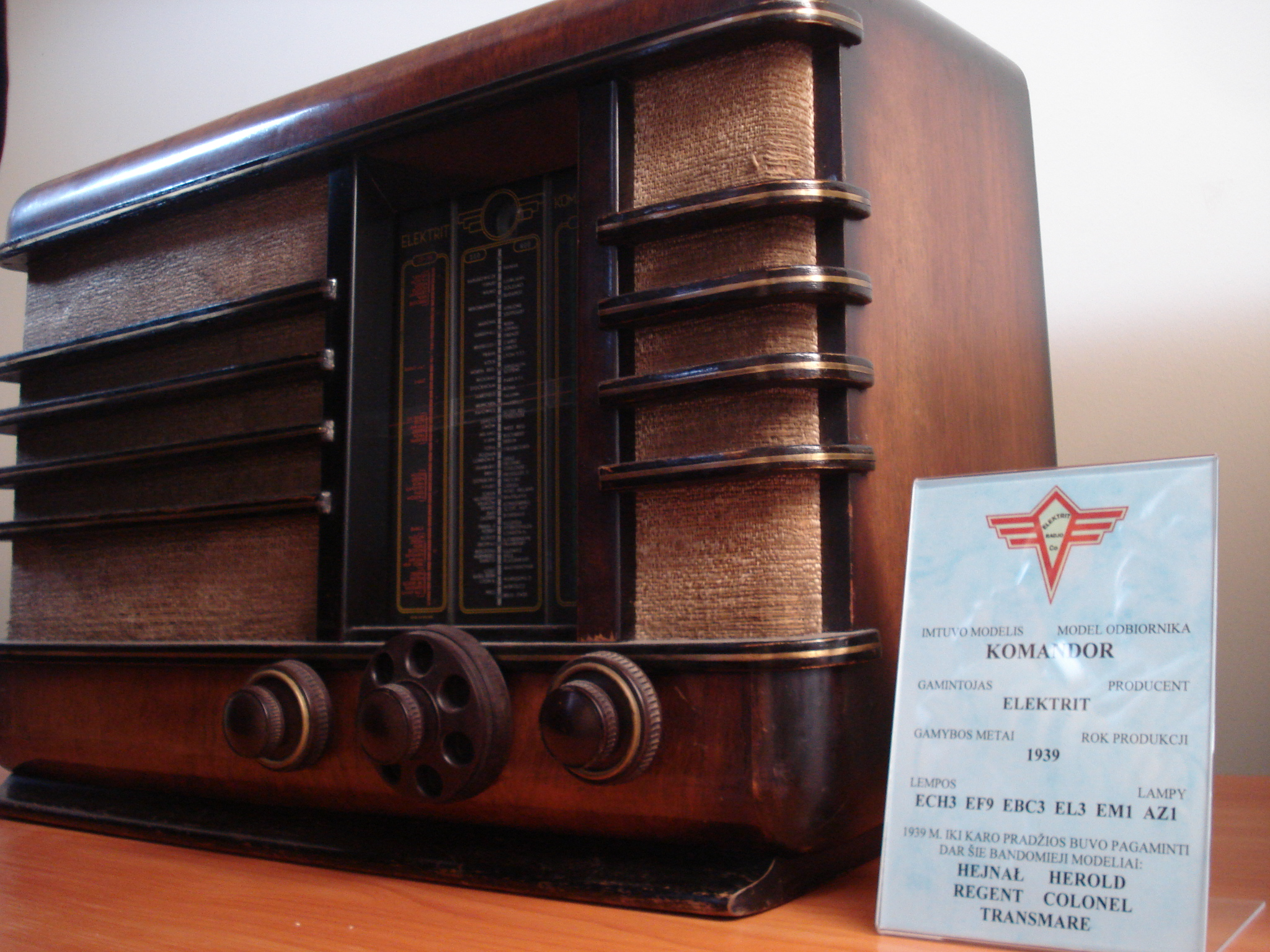
Komandor

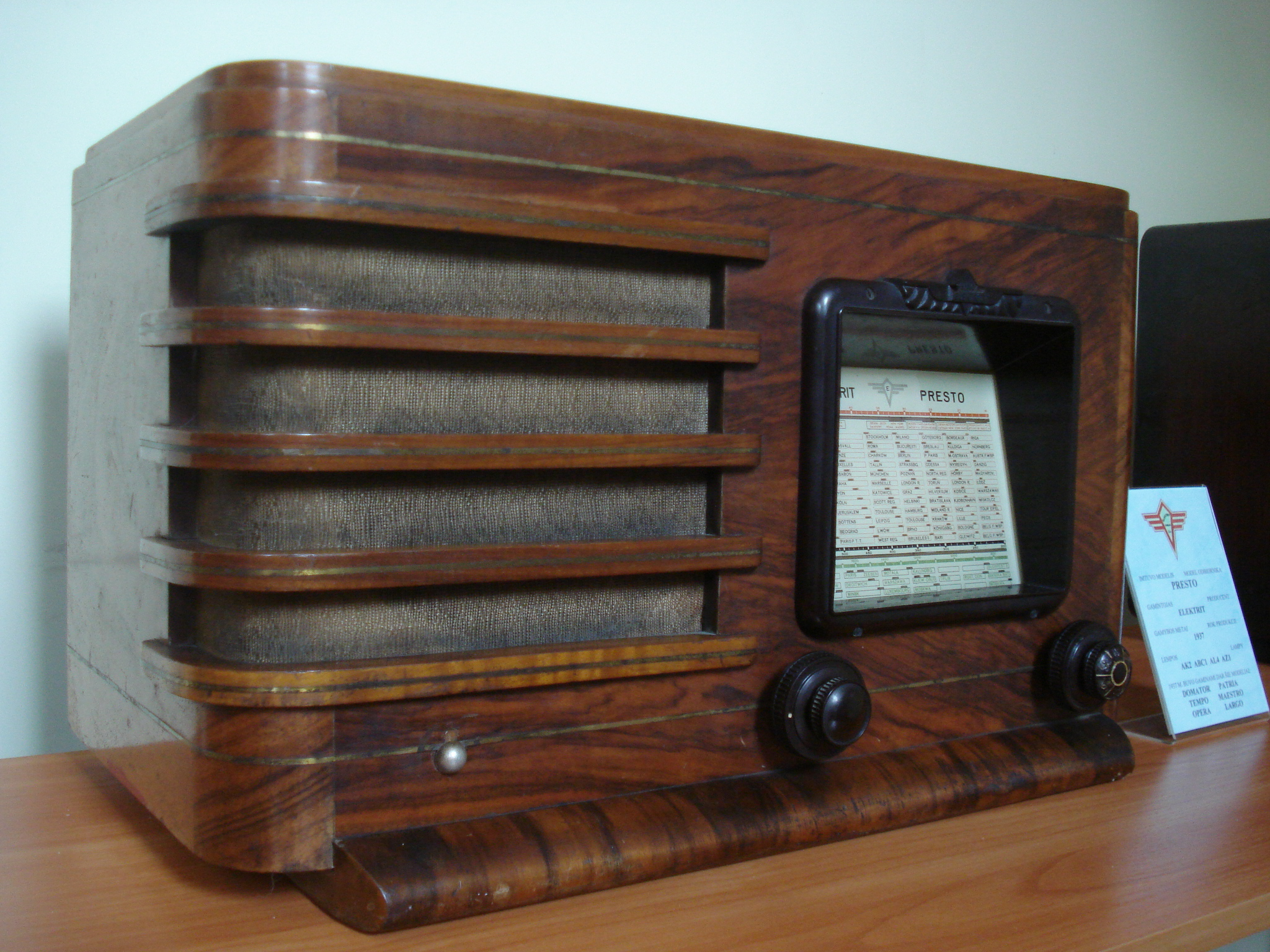
Presto

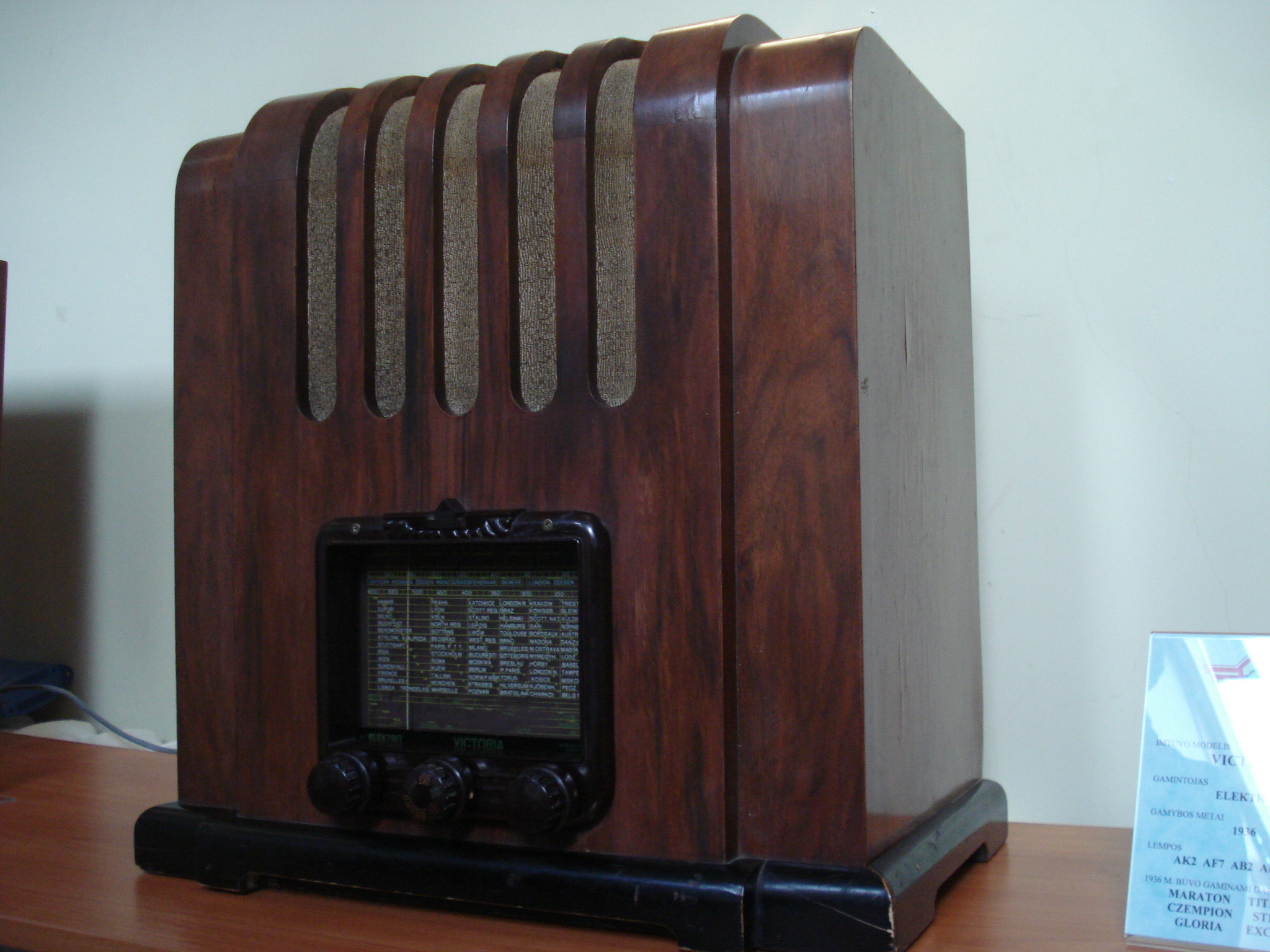
Victoria

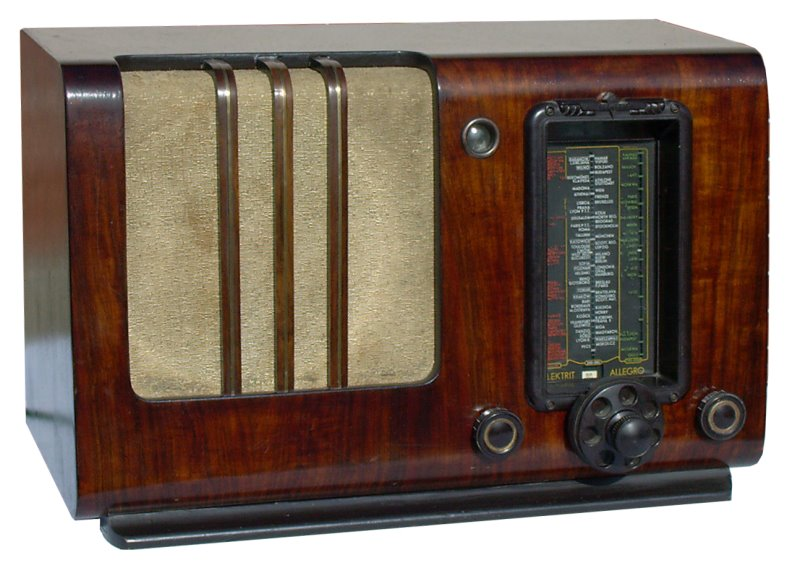
Allegro

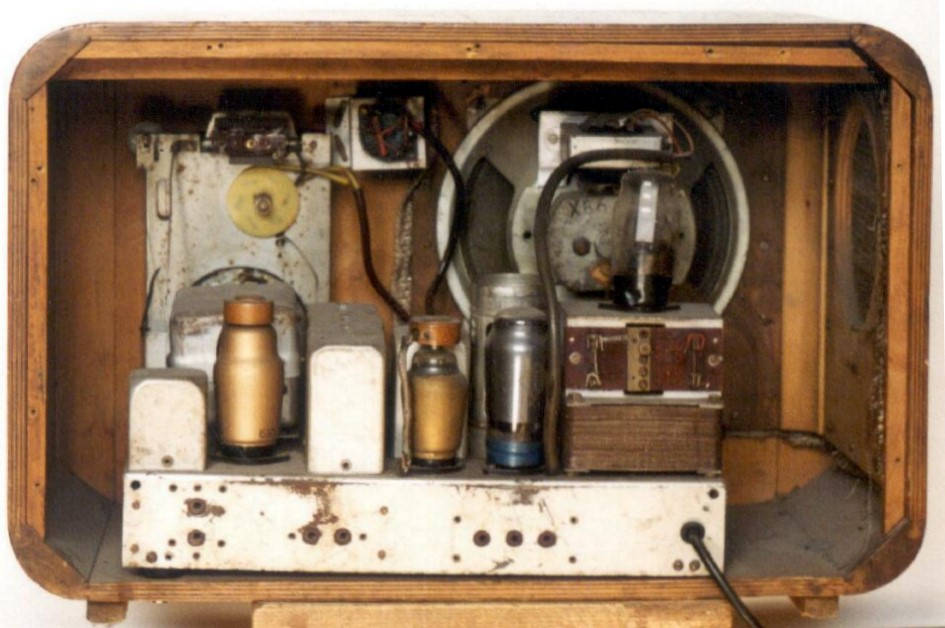
Opera

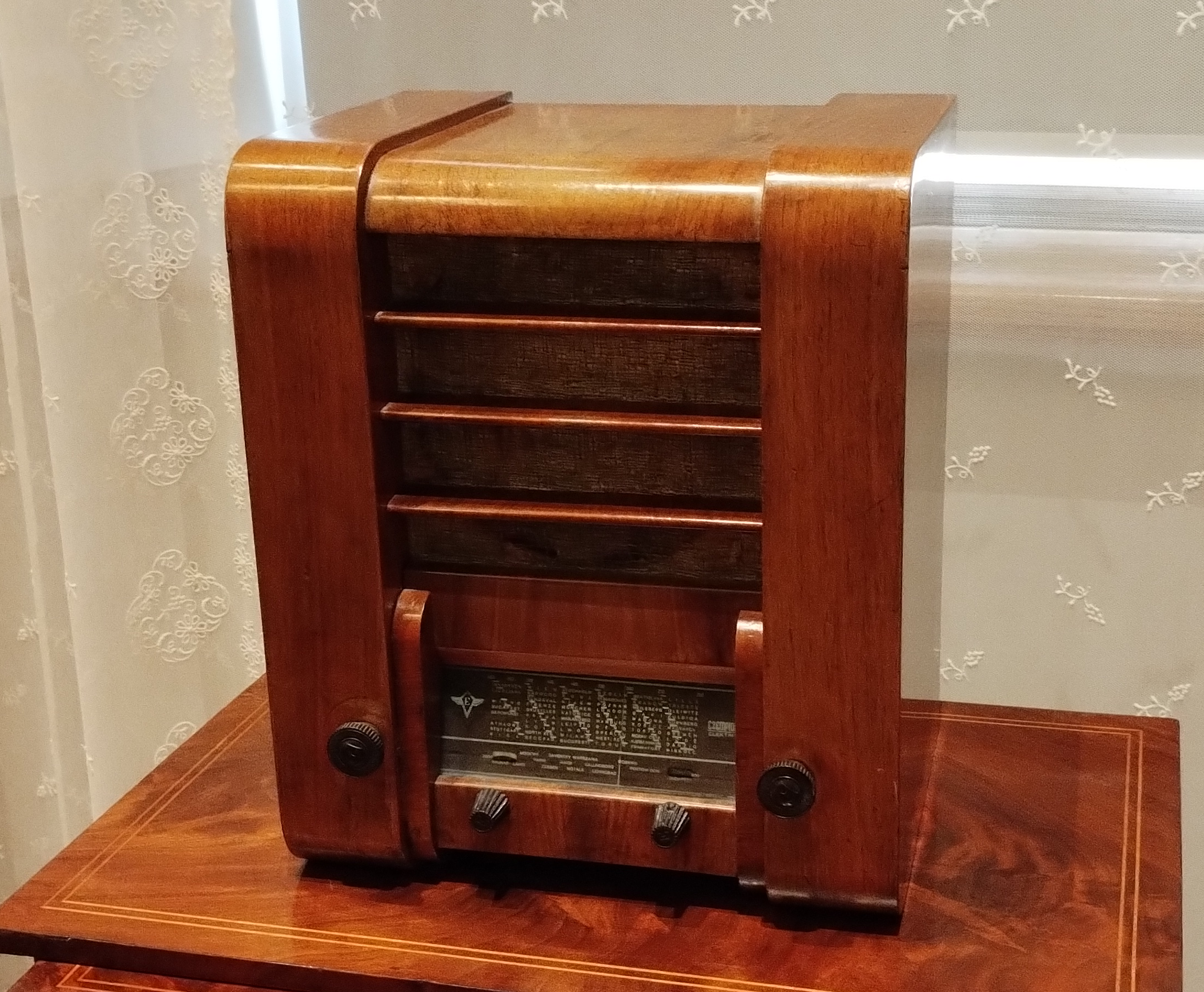
Czempion-Z

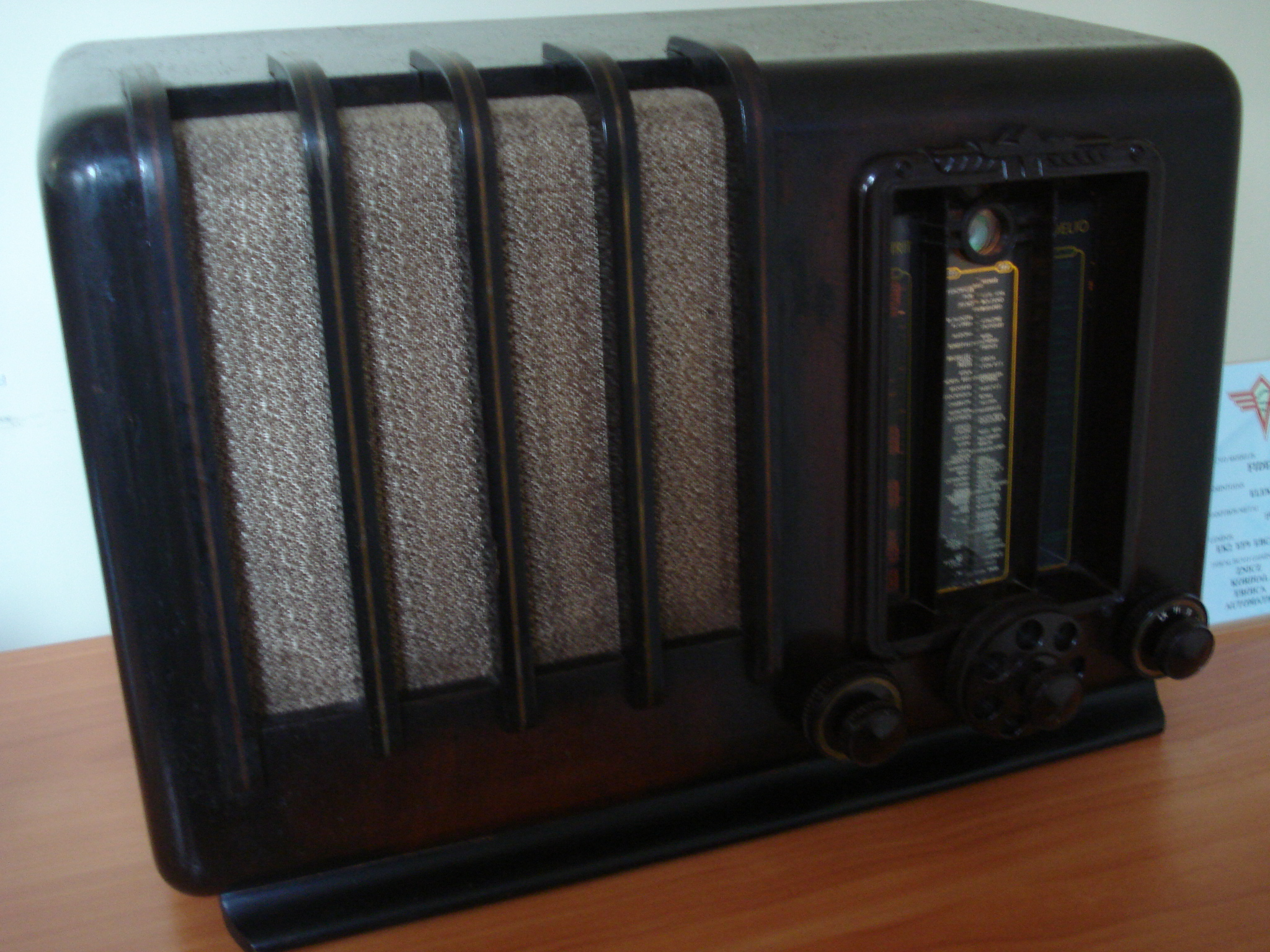
Fidelio
