= Kailis forced labor camp =

Nazi concentration camp for Jews in Lithuania

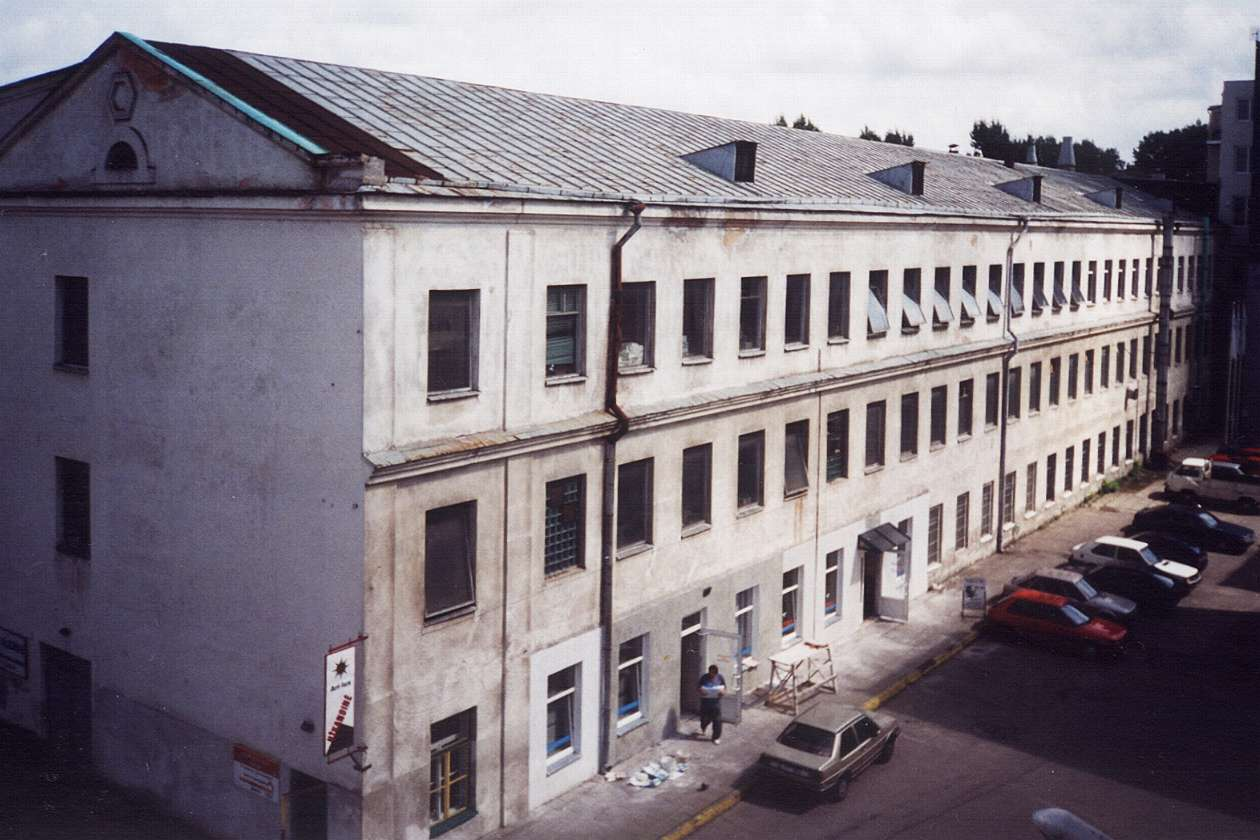
- Former building of the camp in 2001

- Location of Kailis forced labor camp within Lithuania
- Location: Ševčenkos street 16, Vilnius, Lithuania; 54°40′35″N 25°15′59″E
- Date: 5 October 1941 to 3 July 1944
- Incident type: Forced labor, imprisonment, mass shootings
- Organizations: Nazi SS
- Ghetto: Vilna Ghetto
- Victims: About 1,000 Jews

Kailis forced labor camp (kailis is Lithuanian for fur) was a Nazi labor camp for Jews in Vilnius (pre-war Second Polish Republic, post-war Lithuanian SSR) during World War II. It was based on a pre-war fur and leather factory and mostly produced winter clothing for the German military. At its peak, after the liquidation of the Vilna Ghetto in September 1943, the camp housed about 1,500 Jews. The camp was liquidated and its workers executed at Ponary on 3 July 1944, just ten days before Red Army captured the city.

== Establishment ==
There were several fur and leather workshops and factories in Vilnius, most of them owned by Jews. After the Soviet occupation in June 1940, private enterprises were nationalized. The three fur factories Furs, Nutria, (Note: Nutria was located in Paupys district (present-day Paupio street 28).) and Ursus were consolidated and merged into one fur factory. One factory was located behind the Vilnius Town Hall. (Note: The building is located on the corner of Didžioji st. and Etmonų st. Before 2011, it had a dual address of Didžioji st. 29 and Etmonų st. 1. In Polish, the street was known as ulica Hetmańska.) Almost immediately after the German invasion of Russia in June 1941, the factory was given orders to produce winter clothing for the Wehrmacht. Its director took measures to protect factory workers who were mostly Jewish from the atrocities committed in the Vilna Ghetto and Ponary massacre. For example, on 9 September, the director successfully petitioned the German administration to dedicate four houses within the ghetto to workers of Kailis.

On 5 October 1941, the factory was moved to the larger premises of the evacuated radio receiver factory Elektrit. (Note: Elektrit was located at present-day Ševčenkos street. In 1941, it was Mortos Mindaugienės street. Before that it was named after General Stanisław Szeptycki (ulica Generała Szeptyckiego).) The move was arranged by Oscar Glik, an Austrian Jew who managed to obtain Volksdeutsche papers and later, in effect, became director of the factory. At the time, the factory had 448 workers. Together with family members (a total of about 800–1,000 people), they lived in two large buildings at the factory site. (Note: The two blocks were at M. Mindaugienės st. 7/8 and M. Mindaugienės st. 15.) It was a relatively safe place; the workers were one of the first to receive work permits (known as yellow Schein) that protected them from Aktions – round ups for executions at Ponary. Ghetto inhabitants considered Kailis workers as "privileged" and resented them.

== The "quiet period" ==
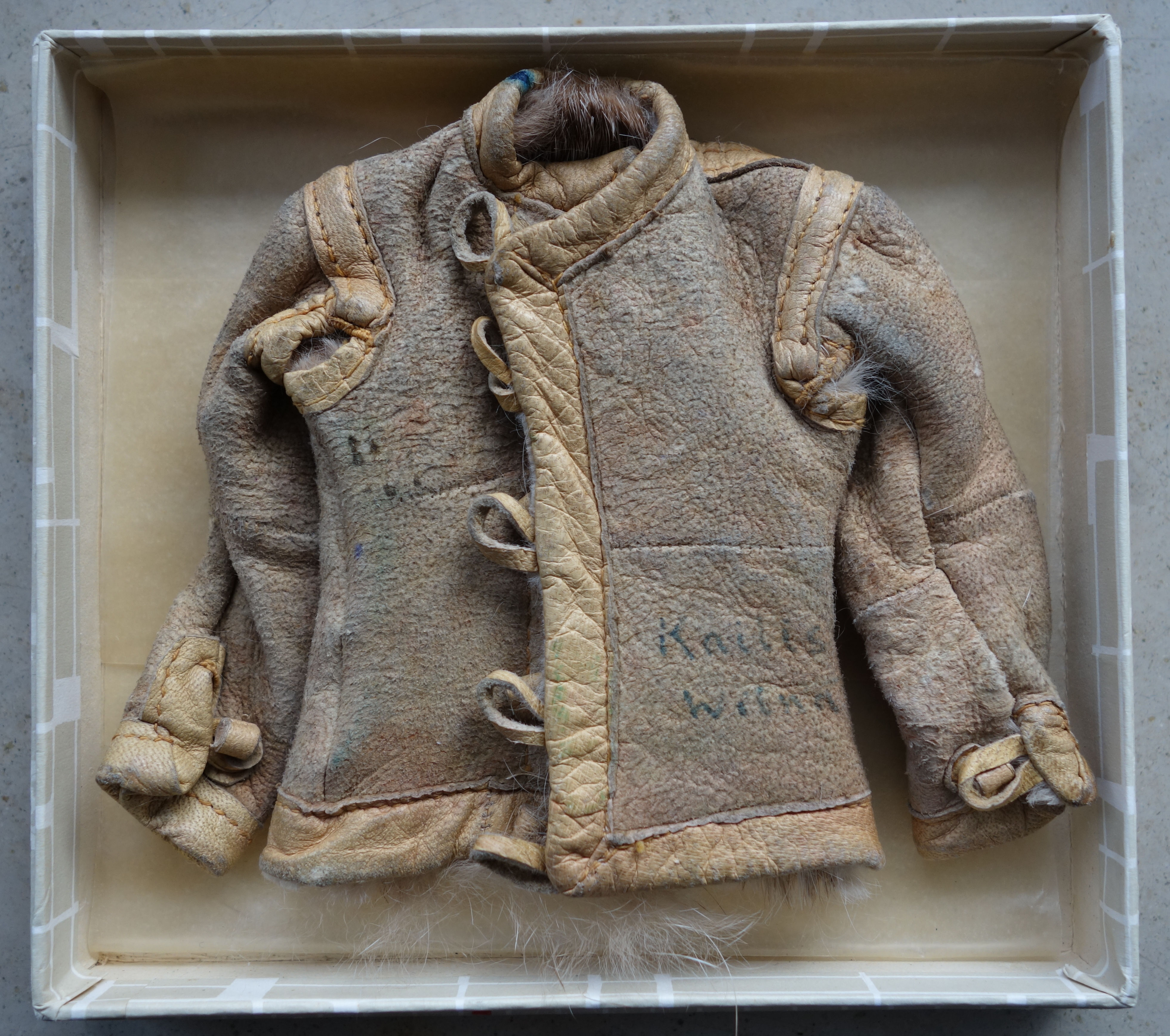
A miniature fur jacket produced at Kailis

On 18 January 1942, the factory suffered a major fire. The cause is not entirely clear. According to Abraham Sutzkever, it was a sabotage action by Fareinigte Partizaner Organizacje (FPO), but Isaak Kowalski stated that it was an accident. During the investigation, Germans discovered that Glik was a Jew and executed him and his wife.

In May 1942, Germans conducted a census in the Generalbezirk Litauen of the Reichskommissariat Ostland. The census counted 1,016 people from 348 families at Kailis. 1942 was the "quiet period" which provided an opportunity to establish some cultural life at the camp. The Jews established a school for children, a small library, sports competitions. The camp had its own Jewish police and clinic.

== Liquidation ==
In August–September 1943, Vilna Ghetto was liquidated and only the Kailis and HKP 562 forced labor camps and two other small groups (Note: The first was about 70 Jewish working at a military hospital in Antakalnis and the second was about 60 Jews working for the Gestapo.) remained in the city. The population of Kailis swelled up. Many Jews used the camp as a temporary refuge before finding a better hideout or joining the Jewish partisans in the forests. According to Yitzhak Arad, about 600 Jews passed through the camp. On 15 October, Bruno Kittel conducted a thorough inspection of the camp and executed about 30 Jews who could not account for their presence at the camp. The inspections were carried out a few more times. In November, Kailis received a new commander, SS-man Richter. He instituted a greater control of the camp and compiled a list of its residents. The list contained about 1,350 names, though another 100 or so were too afraid to register.

On 27 March 1944, the camp's children under age 16 were rounded up in an operation commanded by Martin Weiss. They were taken to the train station; their further fate is not known. Without a concrete evidence of their fate, various rumors spread. The Black Book published a testimony that the children were taken to Kraków where they were used as blood and skin donors for injured German soldiers. On 20 April, 80 workers from Kailis were taken to Ponary to exhume and burn corpses according to the Sonderaktion 1005. On 3 July 1944, remaining workers of Kailis were rounded up, transported to Ponary, and executed. In total, about 2,000–2,500 Jews from various camps were executed in Ponary that day.
