= Bruno Kittel =

Austrian SS officer

Bruno Kittel (born 1922 in Austria – disappeared 1945) was an Austrian Nazi functionary in the German SS and Holocaust perpetrator who oversaw the liquidation of the Vilna Ghetto in September 1943. Kittel became known for his cynical cruelty. He disappeared after the war.

== Early life ==
Kittel graduated from a theater school. He was an actor and a singer. He played saxophone and piano; on Sundays he played for Vilnius Radio.

== SS career ==
Kittel joined the SS and reached the rank of Oberscharführer. Before the appointment to Vilnius, he worked at the Commissariat-General for Jewish Affairs in France and Riga.

Kittel was transferred to Vilnius in occupied Lituania in June 1943. Effectively, he replaced Martin Weiss and Franz Murer. Kittel supervised the massacre of Jews in Kena and Bezdonys on 8–9 July: while Kittel addressed the Jews gathered inside a large building and promised them better food and security for good work, Lithuanian collaborators cordoned off the building and, once the speech was over, they set the building on fire and shot anyone who tried to escape. About 240 Jews were killed in Kena and 300–350 in Bezdonys. In Bezdonys, he offered a cigarette to a Jewish barber who had just given him a shave and asked him if he needed a light. The barber replied yes and Kittel gave him the light by shooting him. That was the signal to start the massacre.

When Yitzhak Wittenberg, a leader of the Fareynikte Partizaner Organizatsye (FPO), escaped from the custody of the Jewish ghetto police, Kittel issued an ultimatum stating that if Wittenberg did not surrender, the whole ghetto would be liquidated. Wittenberg turned himself in and was found dead (possibly due to a suicide by cyanide) on July 16. On 24 July, a group of 21 FPO members, the so-called Leon Group, left the ghetto to go wood cutting in a nearby labour camp in Naujoji Vilnia (they were trying to escape the ghetto). Nine men were killed in a German ambush. The Germans retaliated by executing 32 relatives of the nine men on 27 July and liquidating the labor camp on 28 July. Kittel further announced that collective punishments would be imposed in order to prevent such escapes: The Germans would execute the family members and even the neighbors of anyone who escaped.

The order to liquidate the ghetto was given by Rudolf Neugebauer, the commander of Einsatzkommando 3. Kittel supervised the liquidation of the ghetto on 23–24 September 1943. The remaining Jews were transported to the Klooga concentration camp in Estonia (about 2,000 men), the Kaiserwald concentration camp in Latvia (about 1,400–1,700 young women), and the others were transported to extermination camps, mainly Auschwitz (about 5,000–7,000 people who were unfit for work). During the liquidation of the ghetto, Kittel ordered that a piano be brought to a yard. He continued to play it with his left hand while he shot a Jewish boy who begged for mercy with his right hand.

After the liquidation of the Vilna Ghetto, Kittel visited the remaining labor camps and terrorized their inmates. On 15 October, he inspected Kailis forced labor camp and deported 30 Jews for execution in Ponary. In late 1943, Germans arrested a couple that escaped from the HKP 562 forced labor camp. Kittel organized a public hanging of the couple and their daughter, but the noose tore. He then personally shot the man and the woman; another Gestapo man shot the child. In December, Kittel demanded the location of Salk Dessler, deputy of Jacob Gens who escaped the ghetto. Dessler was betrayed by a former Jewish policeman and arrested with about 30 other Jews; most of them were executed. After the liquidation of the Vilnius Ghetto, Kittel was posted to the newly formed Kovno concentration camp in the reorganized Kovno Ghetto as a liaison between the SS commander in the ghetto and the Gestapo in the city of Kaunas. On 27 March 1944, Kittel participated in the Kinderaktion in the ghetto, a roundup of about 1,700 children and the elderly who were subsequently murdered. During that Aktion, Kittel interrogated Jewish policemen on their assistance to Jewish partisans and selected 33 of them for execution at the Ninth Fort.
