= Ponary =

- Village
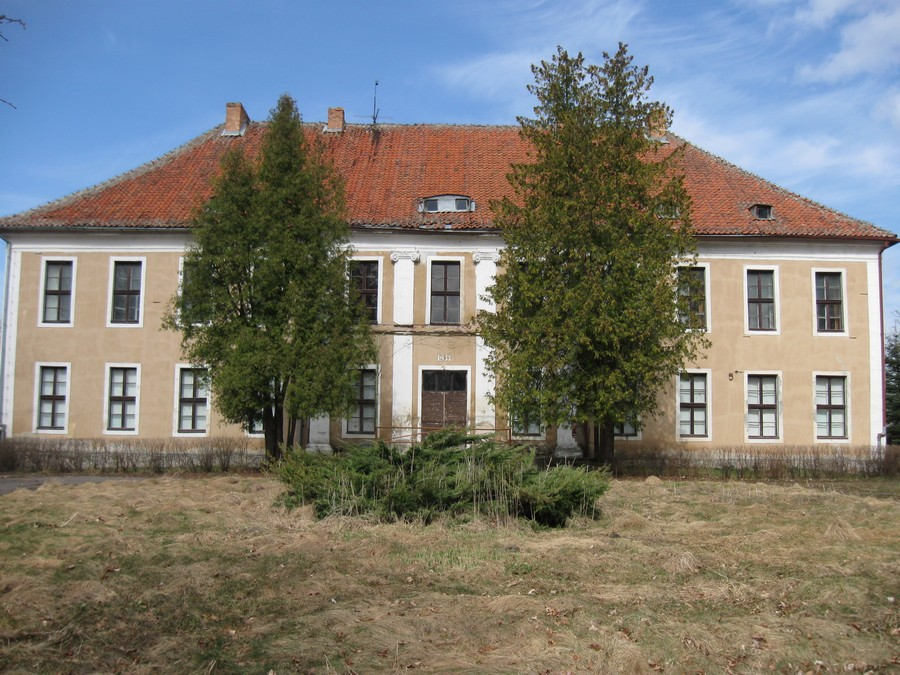

- Location within Poland
- Coordinates: 53°56′28″N 20°1′57″E
- Country: Poland
- Voivodeship: Warmian-Masurian
- County: Ostróda
- Gmina: Miłakowo
- Population: 120

Ponary [pɔˈnarɨ] is a village in the administrative district of Gmina Miłakowo, within Ostróda County, Warmian-Masurian Voivodeship, in northern Poland.
