= Rachel Kostanian =

Lithuanian Jewish activist (born ~ 1930)

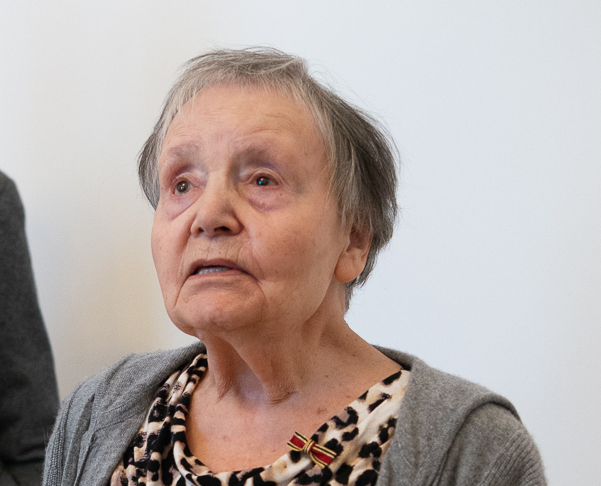
- Other names: Rachilė Kostanian; Rachelė Kostanian; Rachel Kostanian-Danzig

Rachel Kostanian is a Lithuanian Jewish activist, founder and longtime director of a Holocaust museum in Vilnius, and book author. She is a recipient of the Order of Merit of the Federal Republic of Germany.

== Early life ==
Kostanian was born Rachel Zivelchinski in Lithuania. Kostanian's father, Yosif Zivelchinski, was a judge in Šiauliai, and her mother Bluma (née Danzig) was a Yiddish teacher. The family followed Bundism. Kostanian and her mother escaped the Holocaust in 1941 because they were taken to the Soviet Union together with other families of Soviet officials. They lived in Balachna near Gorky until Kostanian was sent with 200 other Lithuanian, Jewish and non-Jewish children to a children's home in the Urals. At the end of 1944, Kostanian returned to Vilnius. After finishing high school, she studied law at Vilnius University, and earned a degree in law. She could not find work as a lawyer. She went on to work in Kirovakan as an English teacher at a music school.

In 1989, Emanuelis Zingeris offered Kostanian the position of Scientific Secretary for the Museum. Under her leadership, the Vilna Gaon Jewish State Museum with exhibits centering on the Holocaust, was established. The museum opened in 1991 in the so-called "Green House", formerly part of the Museum of the October Revolution. Kostanian expanded the museum's inventory of personal narratives by placing advertisements in local and international media asking for "letters, books, photographs, manuscripts, clothing, dishes."

A first conference on the Holocaust in Lithuania was held in Vilnius in 1993, on the 50th anniversary of the liquidation of the Vilnius ghetto. Zingeris and Kostanian jointly published the proceedings of the conference in 1995. In 2020, she participated in an international conference Remembering for the Future – The Holocaust in an Age of Genocide in Oxford. From this meeting, she wrote a paper describing the activities of Jews in the ghetto in the fields of health care, culture, art, science, music, sports, and religion.

== Selected publications ==
- Kostanian, Rachilė (2004). Spiritual resistance in the Vilna Ghetto. Vilnius: Vilna Gaon Jewish State Museum. ISBN 978-9986-9387-2-9.
- Kostanian, Rachilė; Atamukas, Solomon (1996). The Jewish State Museum of Lithuania. The Museum.
- Kostanian, Rachilė; Biber, Jevgenija. "Vilna ghetto posters : Jewish spiritual resistance : from the collection of the Vilna Gaon Jewish State Museum of Lithuania". search.worldcat.org.

== Awards and honors ==
At the age of 91, on February 9, 2021, Kostanian received the Federal Cross of Merit on Ribbon.
