= Martin Weiss (Nazi official) =

German Nazi official (1903–1984)

Martin Weiss

Martin Weiss (21 February 1903 – 30 September 1984) was a German Nazi official and de facto commander of the Vilna Ghetto and a Holocaust perpetrator. He was also the commander of the notorious German-sponsored Ypatingasis būrys killing squad, which was largely responsible for the Ponary massacre in which approximately 100,000 people were shot.

== Early life and military service ==
Weiss was born to a well-to-do Protestant family in Karlsruhe, Germany. Weiss followed his father's steps and received education in plumbing and heating installation. He was an apprentice in his father's shop. From 1923–1927 Weiss lived in South America, helping his brother to establish a farm. After his father's death in 1928, Weiss took over the family business. Two years later he got married. Weiss and his wife had three children.

He was not particularly interested in politics and joined Reiter SS, a branch of Schutzstaffel (SS) that focused on horsemanship and equestrianism, in 1934. In 1937, he also joined the National Socialist German Workers Party. When Nazi Germany invaded Poland in September 1939, he was drafted into the Wehrmacht. Because of his SS membership, he was placed in a Waffen-SS mechanical supply unit, with which he took part in the Battle of France. In August 1940, he returned to his hometown and resumed the family business.

== The Holocaust ==
In spring 1941, he was drafted again and assigned to Einsatzkommando 3, part of the Einsatzgruppe stationed in Bad Düben. In October 1941, he was assigned to work in the Office of the Commander of Security Police (Sicherheitsdienst or SD) and Security Police (Sicherheitspolizei or Sipo) in Vilnius, then part of the Reichskommissariat Ostland. Weiss held this position until July 1944. He was responsible for all aspects of the repression against the Jewish population of Vilnius, which is estimated to have been around 50,000 during the Holocaust. Despite his low rank of technical sergeant (SS-Hauptscharführer), he was in charge of the Vilna Ghetto and nearby Lukiškės Prison, as well as the Ypatingasis būrys killing squad responsible for the Ponary massacre, where Polish Jews and many non-Jewish Poles were brutally killed, including by smashing children's heads (according to professional reporter and eyewitness Józef Mackiewicz) until 1943. The German murderer, Martin Weiss personally supervised 13 to 15 executions at the site. In July 1943, Weiss became chief of the Gestapo prison in Vilnius in occupied Lithuania. In September 1943, he was selected to coordinate the work of the Sonderkommando 1005 to erase evidence of Jewish exterminations i.e unearthing and burning of the corpses.

On 27 March 1944, the children under age 16 of Kailis forced labor camp were rounded up in an operation (Kinderaktion) commanded by Weiss. They were taken to the train station; their further fate is not known.

Weiss was noted by the innocent people held in the ghetto for his merciless cruelty and frequent beatings. In one instance he shot a man on the spot for trying to bring a few potatoes and a bit of fish through the ghetto gates. There are reports of other German soldiers willing to pardon a Jew, but being afraid to do so knowing that Weiss would certainly not approve such an action. Because of his cruel and capricious conduct in sending Jews of the ghetto to the killing grounds at Ponary, Weiss was known in the ghetto by the paradoxical nickname "Weiss, das Schwarz" or "White, the Black".

== Criminal conviction ==
Weiss was arrested in May 1949. In February 1950, a court in Würzburg found him guilty of murder and being an accessory to murder and sentenced him to life imprisonment. In January 1971, Weiss's sentence was suspended; he was granted pardon in 1977.
