= List of Lithuanian Righteous Among the Nations =

Righteous Among the Nations (Hebrew: חסיד אומות העולם) is an honorary title given by Yad Vashem to non-Jews who risked their lives during the Holocaust rescuing Jewish people. The Lithuanian list of honorees includes 924 men and women as of January 1, 2024. The Lithuanian list includes not only Lithuanians, but also Polish and Russian citizens of Lithuania. Lithuania has the second highest count of rescuers per capita.

Most of the Jews were saved by peasants as it was easier to hide them in remote farms and most rescued Jews were children as they attracted less attention. More Jews were saved in Samogitia (western Lithuania) than in other areas of Lithuania. Many of the rescued Jews were helped by multiple people. For example, Glikas family (parents and five children) was helped by about twenty Lithuanian families; ten individuals were recognized as the Righteous Among the Nations in 2005. The search for the righteous is ongoing but it has become increasingly difficult to find survivors who can confirm the fact of rescue and tell their story.

The Righteous Among the Nations award was established in 1963. Julija Vitkauskienė and Ona Šimaitė were the first Lithuanians to be awarded this title in 1966. The majority of the Lithuanian rescuers, recognized as Righteous, have also received the Lithuanian State Award, the Life Saving Cross. The cross was first awarded in September 1992 and it was initiated by Vytautas Landsbergis, chairman of the Supreme Council – Reconstituent Seimas, and Emanuelis Zingeris, director of the Jewish Museum.

== Notable Lithuanian righteous ==
- Petras Baublys (recognized in 1977), pediatrician. He rescued children from the Kovno Ghetto and housed them in an orphanage.
- Kazys Binkis (recognized in 1988), writer and his wife Sofija Binkienė (1967). They hid Jews in their house in Kaunas and looked for other hiding places for them. During the German occupation, the Binkis house was informally known as the "Jewish Hotel". After the war, Sofija Binkienė compiled the first more comprehensive book on Jewish rescuers in Lithuania, Ir be ginklo kariai (Soldiers Even Without Weapons) published in 1967.
- Marija and Jeronimas Bukontas (1995), peasants. They saved and adopted Alfonsas Bukontas (born 1941), the future poet.
- Dainauskas family (2004). They saved Icchokas Meras (born 1934), the future writer, and his sister. He was helped by multiple people, six of whom were recognized as the Righteous Among the Nations.
- Kazys Grinius (2015), President of Lithuania. In 1942, he submitted a letter of protest against the killing of Lithuanian Jews to the German General Commissariat in Kaunas. In 1941–1942, Grinius sheltered Dimitrijus Gelpernas in his home. None of the visitors, who came to see the former president, betrayed Gelpernas.
- Steponas Kairys (2005), signatory of the Act of Independence of Lithuania. Together with his wife Ona, he sheltered a Jewish girl from the Vilnius Ghetto. Eleven-year-old Anusė Keilsonaitė lived with them for almost a year.
- Olga Kuzmina-Dauguvietienė (1985), actress, and her three daughters. They sheltered Ija Taubman as well as several Jewish children.
- Elena Kutorgienė (recognized in 1982), ophthalmologist. She rescued children from the Kovno Ghetto, hid them, and found more permanent housing for them.
- Sofija Kymantaitė-Čiurlionienė (1991), writer and widow of the painter and composer Mikalojus Konstantinas Čiurlionis with her daughter writer Danutė Čiurlionytė-Zubovienė and son-in-law architect Vladimiras Zubovas. They helped rescue Esther, one-year old daughter of the writer Meir Jelin. They worked with Petras Baublys and saved children and others from the Kovno Ghetto.
- Stefanija Ladigienė (1992), member of the Seimas and widow of General Kazys Ladiga. She sheltered Irena Veisaitė, the future theatre scholar.
- Petronėlė Lastienė (2000), teacher and university professor. She helped hide Tamara Lazerson and other students.
- Elena Lukauskienė (2006), chess master. Together with her husband, she helped three Jewish children.
- Ona Jablonskytė-Landsbergienė (1995), doctor, mother of politician Vytautas Landsbergis. She helped 16-year old Bella Gurvich (later Rozenberg).
- Antanas Macenavičius and his wife Marija (1976). They sheltered Aleksandras Štromas, the future political scientists, for about nine months.
- Pranas Mažylis (2006), physician. He smuggled minors out of the ghetto and arranged their further protection and care.
- Bronislovas Paukštys (1977), priest. He forged birth and baptismal records and helped Jews find a safe hiding place. He saved some 120 Jewish children.
- Kipras Petrauskas (1999), operatic tenor and his wife Elena Žalinkevičaitė-Petrauskienė (1999), actress and writer. They saved Dana Pomeranz-Mazurkevich, the future violinist and professor at Boston University College of Fine Arts.
- Antanas Poška (2000), traveler and anthropologist. During the war, he was a director of a public library in Vilnius and refused to destroy books in Hebrew and Yiddish. He helped Akiva Gerszater, a fellow Esperantist, first by employing him in the library and then hiding him in his home for about ten months.
- Jackus Sondeckis (1996), Mayor of Šiauliai. He saved the now famous theater critic, Markas Petuchauskas, and his mother.'
- Juozas Rutkauskas (1996), office worker. He got a job in a passport department and helped forge documents saving some 150 Jews. He was executed by the Gestapo in 1944.

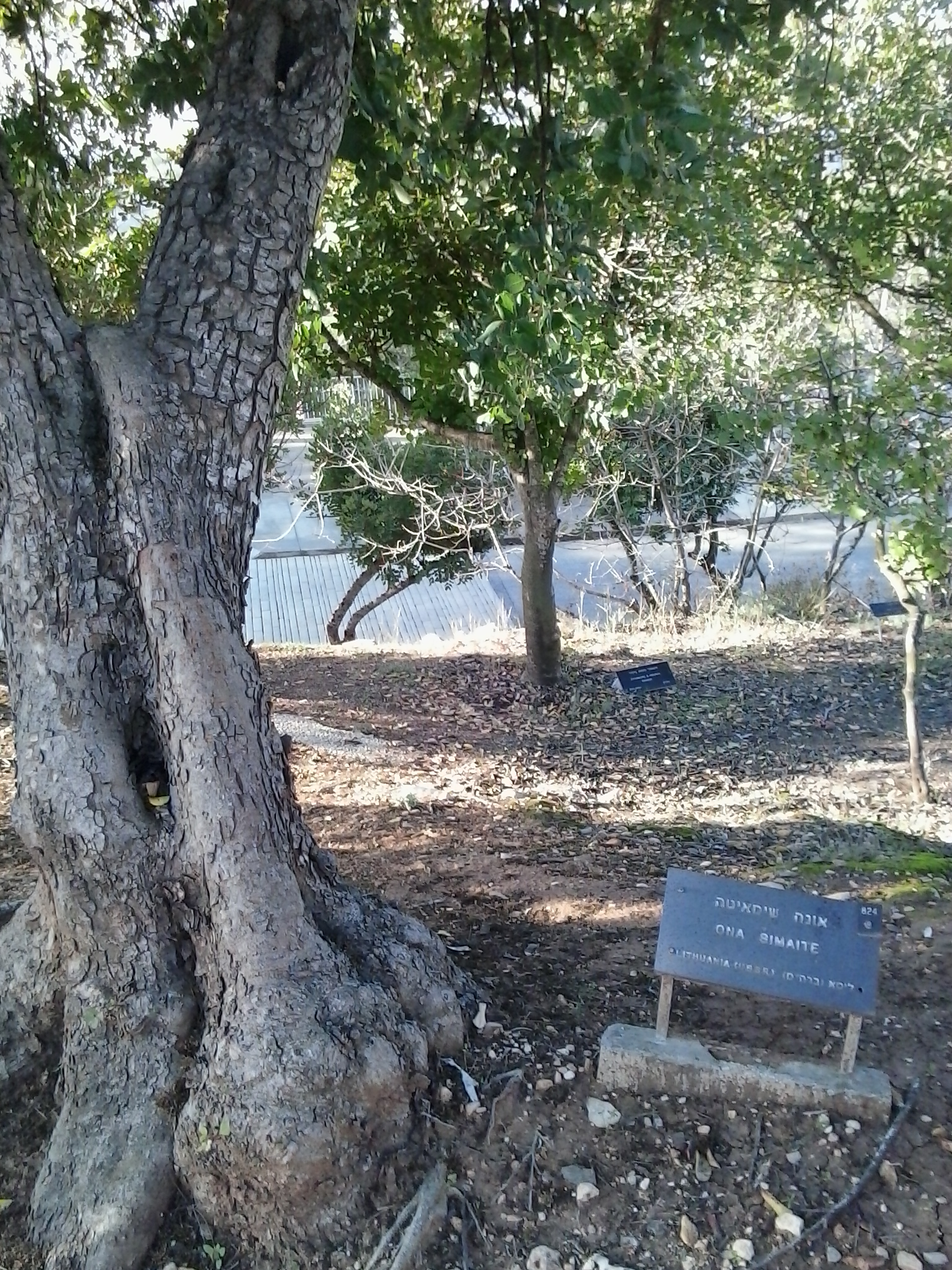
Tree dedicated to Ona Šimaitė in the Garden of the Righteous

- Ona Šimaitė (1966), librarian. She used her professional position of a librarian at Vilnius University to enter the Vilnius Ghetto claiming that she had to collect Jewish books from students. She smuggled food, medicine, documents, letters, money and other necessities into the ghetto and carried out documents and literary work thus helping to preserve Jewish cultural heritage. She became a regular liaison between the two worlds and received help from the writer Kazys Jakubėnas and colleagues at the university. Šimaitė rescued people by looking for shelter for them, and carrying small children in baskets. She managed to hide a young Jew, Tanya Wachsman, in the Vilnius University Library.
- Stasys Sviderskis (1997), leader of a youth camp in Druskininkai. At the start of the Operation Barbarossa, he evacuated about 70 Jewish children to Russia.
- Stanislava Jakševičiūtė-Venclauskienė (1995), actress and widow of Kazimieras Venclauskis, and her two daughters. She established a sewing workshop which employed nearly 50 Jewish women. Venclauskienė also hid several Jews.

== Non-Lithuanian righteous in Lithuania ==
- Anna Borkowska (Sister Bertranda) (1984), Polish nun. She hid members of Hashomer Hatzair, a local Zionist group, including Abba Kovner and Abraham Sutzkever. (Note: These rescuers saved Jews in Vilnius (Vilna, Wilno) which was part of the Second Polish Republic before the war and became part of the Lithuanian SSR after the war.)
- Karl Plagge (2004), German engineer, major with the German Army. As a leader of the HKP 562 forced labor camp, he issued work permits to non-essential workers.
- Anton Schmid (1964), Austrian Wehrmacht soldier. He hid Jews in his apartment, obtained work permits to save Jews from the Ponary massacre, transferred Jews in Wehrmacht trucks to safer locations. It is estimated that he saved as many as 300 Jews before his arrest and execution in early 1942.
- Chiune Sugihara (1984), vice consul for the Japanese Empire in Kaunas. He issued multiple transit visas to Jews. He is the only Japanese person recognized as the Righteous Among the Nations.
- Jan Zwartendijk (1997), Dutch businessman and diplomat. He issued more than 2,000 visas to Curaçao and Dependencies in the West Indies.

== Research ==
Number of recognized people by year
Years	People
1966–1969	6
1970–1974	8
1975–1979	42
1980–1984	79
1985–1989	13
1990–1994	126
1995–1999	178
2000–2004	115
2005–2009	215
2010–2014	96
2015–2019	38
2020–2024	8
Total	924

The first stories of rescuers appeared in Lithuanian press in late 1944, and Lithuanians who retreated west after the war collected questionnaires from Lithuanians in displaced persons camps in post-war Germany in 1947–1948. In total, 231 questionnaires were completed. However, the Holocaust research in the Soviet Union was generally suppressed. Therefore, information from these questionnaires was first published only in 1991–1992, i.e. after Lithuania declared independence in 1990. A book based on these questionnaires (originals are kept at the Department of Special Collections and Archives of Kent State University) by Jonas Rimašauskas was published in 2008, almost 40 years after the author's death. Sofija Binkienė compiled the first more comprehensive book on Jewish rescuers in Lithuania, Ir be ginklo kariai (Soldiers Even Without Weapons), and managed to get it published in Vilnius in 1967. The book listed about 400 names of rescuers and rescued Jews. In 1999, the Union of Lithuanian Canadian Journalists (Lithuanian: Kanados lietuvių žurnalistų sąjunga) published a list of rescuers and rescued Jews compiled by Antanas Gurevičius. Based on various sources, he counted 6,271 rescuers and 10,137 rescued Jews. However, the book has been criticized for lax inclusion criteria. For example, it includes 1,000 people who signed a petition in Raseiniai to save a Jewish family as rescuers (the petition was ignored); it also includes 2,000 Jewish children as rescued Jews based on an unsuccessful petition by women in Utena.

The Vilna Gaon Jewish State Museum was established in 1989 and began systematic study and collection of information about the rescuers and the rescued. As of 1998, it has collected information about more than 2,300 families (including 120 priests) who rescued Jews and has compiled a list of about 3,000 rescued Jews. In 1997, the Vilna Gaon Jewish State Museum started publishing the series Gyvybę ir duoną nešančios rankos (Hands Bringing Life and Bread), which documents stories of Jewish rescue. In 2009, the fourth volume was published. In 2009, the museum unveiled an exhibition "Išsigelbėjęs Lietuvos žydų vaikas pasakoja apie Šoa" (Rescued Lithuanian Jewish Child Tells about Shoa) with about 1,000 pages of text, 6,000 photos, 60 hours of visual and 5 hours of audio material. The exhibition was published as a DVD and is available online. In 2011, the museum published a book with a list of 2,570 names of Lithuanians who rescued Jews. In 2012, the Genocide and Resistance Research Centre of Lithuania published a list of rescuers that combined previously published lists by the Jewish State Museum, Gurevičius, Rimašauskas as well as the lists of those recognized as Righteous Among the Nations and awarded the Life Saving Cross to come up with a list of 3,277 names. The list was made available online.

== Commemoration ==
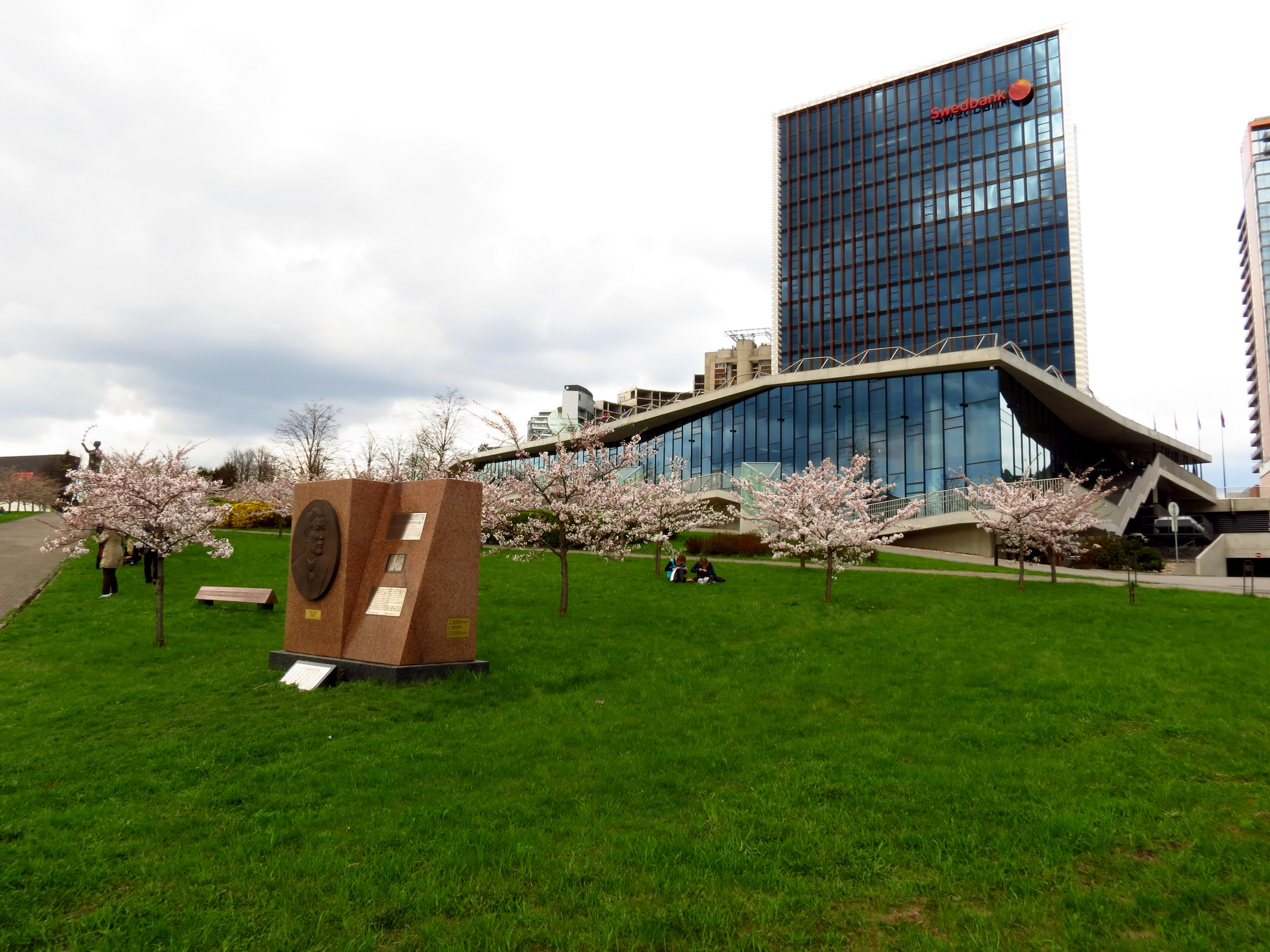
Sakura park in Vilnius in honor of Chiune Sugihara

In 2018, a twelve-part documentary film series Pasaulio teisuoliai (The Righteous Among the Nations) was released by the Lithuanian National Radio and Television. An exhibition "Išgelbėjęs vieną gyvybę, išgelbėja visą pasaulį" (One Who Saves One Life Saves the Entire World), a narrative of 105 stories about the rescuers, has been traveling throughout the country. In 2019, a comprehensive catalog of this exhibition was released.

In October 2001, sakura trees were planted in Vilnius to honor the 100th birth anniversary of the Japanese diplomat Chiune Sugihara. In 2011, a street in Viršuliškės, a district of Vilnius, was named after Juozas Rutkauskas who saved about 150 Jews and was executed by the Nazis. In 2015, a street in the Old Town of Vilnius was renamed after Ona Šimaitė. In June 2018, a monument to Jan Zwartendijk (about 2,000 LED rods connected into a 7-metre (23 ft) diameter spiral) was unveiled on Laisvės alėja, Kaunas by King Willem-Alexander of the Netherlands and President Dalia Grybauskaitė. On September 21, 2018 a memorial stone was unveiled on Maironis Street in Vilnius to honor Jewish rescuers in Nazi-occupied Lithuania. The stone marks the place where a memorial to Jewish rescuers will be erected in the future. In 2019, Šiauliai decided to reconstruct and dedicate a square next to the former Šiauliai Ghetto to the righteous among the nations. The construction is expected to finish in late 2020 or early 2021.

Architect Tauras Budzys started a private initiative to affix memorial medallions to the tombstones of the righteous among the nations. The medallions measure 76 millimetres (3.0 in) in diameter and are made of brass. They depict two hands that symbolize help, letters A✝A and RIP (short for amžiną atilsį and rest in peace), and inscription "Righteous Among the Nations" in Lithuanian, English, and Yiddish. As of June 2019, Budzys marked about fifty graves.
