= Orders, decorations, and medals of Lithuania =

Awards and decorations of Lithuania are governed by the Republic of Lithuania Law on State Awards of 2002, amended in 2003.

== State decorations ==
The state orders, medals and other decorations are bestowed by the President of Lithuania on 16 February – Day of Re-establishment of the State of Lithuania and 6 July – Day of the State (Coronation of King Mindaugas), and on other days on special occasions.

The President of Lithuania is awarded with the highest order, of Vytautas the Great, upon starting to hold his office after taking the oath, by the Chairman of the Seimas (Lithuanian parliament).

Decorations are minted in Lithuanian Mint, a state own enterprise. National awards are administered by Head of the Presidential Administration, who serves as the ex officio Grand Master of the Orders the Republic.

=== Orders ===
- the Order of Vytautas the Great;
- the Order of the Cross of Vytis;
- the Order of the Lithuanian Grand Duke Gediminas;
- the Order for Merits to Lithuania.

==== Insignia of the Orders ====
- the order with the golden chain (only the Order of Vytautas the Great);
- the Grand Cross (First Class Order);
- the Grand Cross of Commander (Second Class Order);
- the Cross of Commander (Third Class Order);
- the Cross of Officer (Fourth Class Order);
- the Cross of the Knight (Fifth Class Order).

=== Medals and other decorations ===
- Flag of the Order of the Cross of Vytis
- Independence Medal
- Life Saving Cross
- Medal of the Order of the Cross of Vytis
- Medal of the Order of Vytautas the Great
- Medal of the Order of the Lithuanian Grand Duke Gediminas
- Medal of the Order for Merits to Lithuania
- Commemorative Medal of 13 January

=== Order of precedence of decorations ===
1. the Order of Vytautas the Great with the Golden Chain;
2. the Grand Cross of the Order of the Cross of Vytis;
3. the Grand Cross of the Order of Vytautas the Great;
4. the Grand Cross of the Order of the Lithuanian Grand Duke Gediminas;
5. the Grand Cross of the Order for Merits to Lithuania;
6. the Grand Cross of Commander of the Order of the Cross of Vytis;
7. the Grand Cross of Commander of the Order of Vytautas the Great;
8. the Grand Cross of Commander of the Order of the Lithuanian Grand Duke Gediminas;
9. the Grand Cross of Commander of the Order for Merits to Lithuania;
10. the Cross of Commander of the Order of the Cross of Vytis;
11. the Cross of Commander of the Order of Vytautas the Great;
12. the Cross of Commander of the Order of the Lithuanian Grand Duke Gediminas;
13. the Cross of Commander of the Order for Merits to Lithuania;
14. the Cross of Officer of the Order of the Cross of Vytis;
15. the Cross of Officer of the Order of Vytautas the Great;
16. the Cross of Officer of the Order of the Lithuanian Grand Duke Gediminas;
17. the Cross of Officer of the Order for Merits to Lithuania;
18. the Cross of the Knight of the Order of the Cross of Vytis;
19. the Cross of the Knight of the Order of Vytautas the Great;
20. the Cross of the Knight of the Order of the Lithuanian Grand Duke Gediminas;
21. the Cross of the Knight of the Order for Merits to Lithuania;
22. the Life Saving Cross;
23. the Medal of the Order of the Cross of Vytis;
24. the Medal of the Order of Vytautas the Great;
25. the Medal of the Order of the Lithuanian Grand Duke Gediminas;
26. the Order for Merits to Lithuania;
27. the Commemorative Medal of 13 January.

== Other decorations ==
- Medal of Founding Volunteers of the Lithuanian Army
- Star of Riflemen
- Medal of the Star of Riflemen
- Medal of Darius and Girėnas

The above decorations are awarded by the Minister of National Defence. In addition, the Medal of Darius and Girėnas may be awarded by the Minister of Transport and Communications.

== Sources ==
- Official English translation of the Lithuanian law on state awards
- President of Lithuania's official site for Orders, Medals and Other Awards
