= Alis Baublys =

Lithuanian physician

- Born: 8 November 1940 (age 85); Kaunas, Lithuanian Soviet Socialist Republic
- Education: Vilnius University
- Occupation: Physician
- Awards: Order for Merits to Lithuania (2010)

Alis Baublys (born 8 November 1940) is a Lithuanian physician specializing in anesthesiology.

== Biography ==
Baublys was born on 8 November 1940 to the family of the Lithuanian pediatrician Petras Baublys. He graduated from Vilnius University in 1962 and became a Candidate of Medical Sciences in 1970.

Since 1962 and 1973, Baublys served as a lecturer and associated professor, respectively, at Vilnius University. From 1983 to 1991 he served as the head of the Cardiosurgical Resuscitation Department at Vilnius University Hospital Santaros Clinics. He was then head of the Second Clinic of Anesthesiology and Resuscitation at the Vilnius University Faculty of Medicine until 2002. He then returned to the Santaros Clinics and headed the Center for Anesthesiology, Intensive Care and Pain Management until his retirement in 2010.

Baublys also served as president of the Lithuanian Medical Association from 1992 to 1995.

== Works ==
He has published scientific reports on artificial blood circulation, heart failure diagnostics and treatment, and the history of anesthesiology. Together with a team of doctors headed by Algimantas Jonas Marcinkevičius, Baublys participated in the first heart transplant surgery in Lithuania on 2 September 1987.

He was the author of a textbook about anesthesiology and resuscitation.

== Aeromodelling ==
Baublys began modeling aircraft in 1955 at the Vilnius Aeroclub. In 1957, he became the Lithuanian champion in F1B class rubber-powered airplane models. He then switched to F1C class timer airplane models and became eight-time Lithuanian (1959–1966), Baltic (1963), and Soviet Union (1961) champion.

== Awards ==
Baublys received the following state awards:

- Lithuanian SSR State Prize, 1979
- Lithuanian Science Prize, 2005
- Order for Merits to Lithuania, 2010
