= Schwartzberg =

Schwartzberg is a surname. Notable people with the surname include:

- Allan Schwartzberg (born 1942), American rock drummer
- Hirsch Schwartzberg (born 1907), Jewish leader of Holocaust survivors under the Allied occupation of Berlin
- Joseph E. Schwartzberg (born 1928), American geographer
- Louis Schwartzberg, American director, producer, and cinematographer
