= Alfonsas Bukontas =

Lithuanian poet and translator (1941–2026)

Alfonsas Bukontas (11 September 1941 – 23 September 2026) was a Lithuanian poet, translator and publicist.

His Jewish parents were killed during the Holocaust and he was saved by the family of Marija and Jeronimas Bukontas, peasants of the Dapšiai village, Mažeikiai district, recognized among the Lithuanian Righteous Among the Nations in 1995. His father was arrested in 1945 and died in a labor camp in 1948. Alfonsas and his mother went into hiding and avoided deportation. His collection of poems Dapšiu kelio zlatvyslės ("Bog Lights of the Dapšiai Road") is a reminiscence associated with the village.

In 1964 he graduated in Lithuanian philology from the Vilnius University. After that he worked as a teacher, in various publishing outlets, and edited some magazines. His poems have been translated in several languages.

Bukontas died on 23 September 2026, at the age of 85.

== Publications ==
- Slenkančios kopos. Vilnius: Vaga, 1967. Poems.
- Piešiniai ant vandens. Vilnius: Vaga, 1972. Poems.
- Mėnulio takas. Vilnius: Vaga, 1977. Poems.
- Пока летит стрела. Москва: Советский писатель, 1990. ISBN 5-265-01377-6. Poetry.
- Penktas metų laikas. Vilnius: Vaga, 1997. A collection.
- Pirštų atspaudai. Vilnius: Tyto alba, 2011. 100 poems.
- Dapšių kelio žaltvykslės. Vilnius: Petro ofsetas, 2014. Poetry.

== Awards ==
- 1979: S. Šimkus award (Stasio Šimkaus premija) of 1st degree for the text for Algirdas Martinaitis Salve, Alma Mater.
- 1993: Award of P. Gaučys for the best literary translation into Lithuanian.
- 2000: Yotvingian Prize for poetry book Penktas metų laikas, and translations of Bhagavadgita, Lev Karsavin, Moyshe Kulbak.
- 2001: Award during Poetry Spring festival for poetry translations into Lithuanian language.
- 2018: Medal of the Order for Merits to Lithuania
