= Aeroflot Flight 2022 =

1973 aviation accident in the Soviet Union

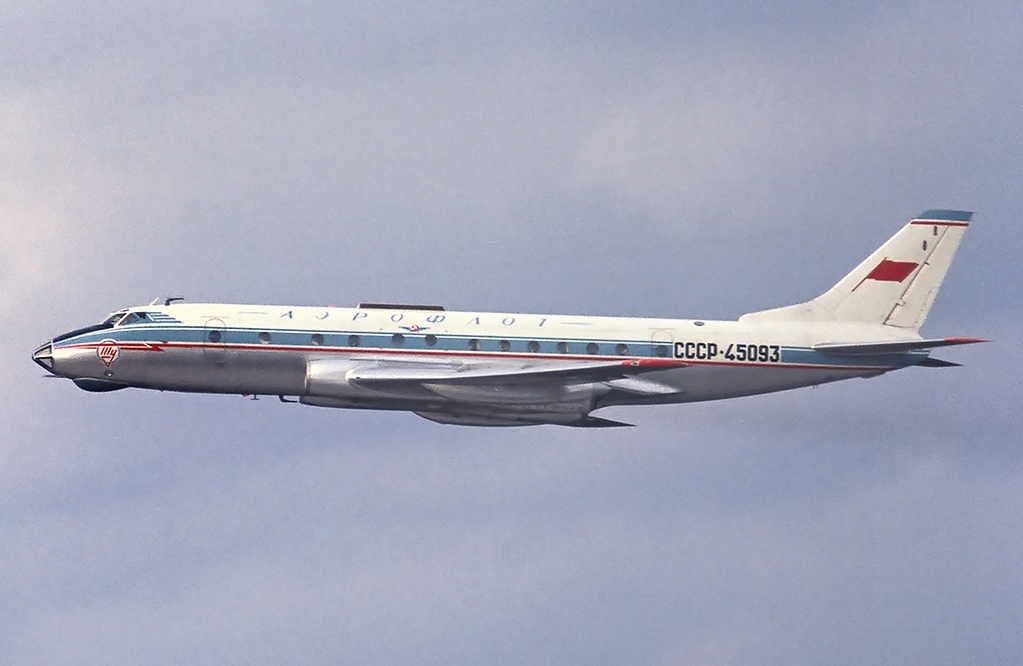
- An Aeroflot Tu-124V, similar to the one involved in the accident

Accident
- Date: 16 December 1973
- Summary: Failure of the horizontal stabilizer resulting in a loss of control
- Site: Near Karacharovo, Russian SSR; 55°44′26″N 35°47′15″E

Aircraft
- Aircraft type: Tupolev Tu-124V
- Operator: Aeroflot
- Registration: CCCP-45061
- Flight origin: Vilnius Airport (VNO/EYVI), Lithuanian SSR
- Destination: Moscow-Vnukovo Airport (VKO/UUWW), Russian SSR
- Occupants: 51
- Passengers: 45
- Crew: 6
- Fatalities: 51
- Survivors: 0

Aeroflot Flight 2022 was a scheduled Soviet domestic passenger flight between Vilnius Airport in Lithuanian SSR and Moscow–Vnukovo Airport in Russian SFSR, that crashed on 16 December 1973, killing all 51 people on board. The flight suffered a loss of control as a result of a malfunction of its elevator, causing it to crash as it made its final descent into Moscow. At the time of the crash, it was the worst accident in aviation history involving a Tupolev Tu-124 since it entered service with Aeroflot in 1962.

== Aircraft ==
The aircraft involved in the accident was a Tupolev Tu-124V, registered CCCP-45061, to Aeroflot. The Tu-124V was a variant of the original Tu-124 which had been introduced in 1962. The 'V' variant of the Tu-124 modified the aircraft to be able to seat 56 passengers, instead of the original 44, and also had increased range and payload capacity. CCCP-45061 was equipped with two Soloviev D-20P turbofan engines and had first flown in 1964. It was assigned to Aeroflot's Lithuania division. At the time of the accident, the aircraft had sustained 14,903 flight hours and 13,832 pressurization cycles.

== Crew and passengers ==
Six crew members were aboard Aeroflot Flight 2022. The flight crew consisted of:

- Captain Stepan Boyko
- Co-pilot Eugenijus Karnila
- Navigator Juozas Časas
- Flight engineer Yuno Shamaev
- Stewardess Maria Cricova

The crew also included a junior police lieutenant as a sky marshal (they were added after the hijacking of Aeroflot Flight 244 in 1970).

All of the passengers were Soviet citizens, with the exception of one who was a West German citizen. The majority of the passengers were Lithuanians. They included four noted Lithuanian pediatricians: Liudmila Steponaitienė, Raimondas Lučinskas, Ona Surplienė, and Petras Baublys, who was known for operating a foster home that saved approximately twenty Jewish orphans during the Holocaust. The doctors had been traveling to a medical conference in Kharkiv. There was one child on board.

The bodies of the victims were cremated in Moscow on 21 December. The four doctors were buried in a public ceremony attended by Lithuanian First Secretary Antanas Sniečkus in Antakalnis Cemetery.

== Accident ==
At 18:10 MSK on 16 December 1973, CCCP-45061 took off from Vilnius Airport in Lithuania SSR and proceeded east on a flight to Moscow-Vnukovo Airport in Russia with six crew and 45 passengers on board. Flight 2022 climbed to a cruising altitude of 7,800 meters (25,600 feet) and at 19:03 MSK air traffic controllers in Moscow gave the pilots clearance to begin a descent to 5,700 meters (18,700 feet). At 19:11 MSK, the pilots reported the aircraft had entered a steep dive and were having difficulties recovering. Just 2,000 meters (6,600 feet) above the ground, the pilots were able to briefly stabilize the aircraft; however, it then entered a stall, followed by a spin. At 19:13 MSK, the aircraft crashed into the ground near the village of Karacharovo, northwest of Moscow. All 51 people aboard the aircraft were killed. At the time of the crash, the visibility was reported to be 2-4 kilometers with haze and cloudy skies.

== Cause ==
An investigation ruled out engine problems or weather having playing a part in the crash. In addition, there were no physical jams in the aircraft's rudder, aileron, and wing trim tab components. Investigators determined that a spontaneous short circuit had caused the elevator trim tab to deflect to and maintain an upward position, which sent the aircraft into a dive and a resulting spin. Because of a loss of situational awareness and a gyro that had failed due to loads sustained in the dive, the crew again lost control of the airplane and it crashed.

== See also ==
- Aeroflot Flight 8641
- Northwest Airlines Flight 85
- United Airlines Flight 585
- 1966 Felthorpe Trident crash
