= Bronislovas Paukštys =

Lithuanian Roman Catholic priest

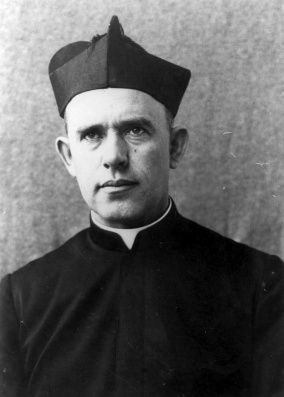
- Born: 15 February 1897; Kurynė, Suwałki Governorate, Congress Poland
- Died: 17 December 1966 (aged 69); Kaunas, Lithuanian SSR
- Occupation: Catholic priest
- Known for: Rescue of Jews during World War II
- Awards: Righteous Among the Nations (1977); Life Saving Cross (1999)

Bronislovas "Bronius" Paukštys (15 February 1897 – 17 December 1966) was a Lithuanian Roman Catholic priest who rescued around 120 Jewish children and 25 Jewish adults from the Holocaust in Lithuania. He was recognized as the Righteous Among the Nations in 1977.

Paukštys was a primary school teacher before joining the Salesians of Don Bosco and receiving an education in Italy. Ordained as a priest in 1935, he worked in Vytėnai, Saldutiškis, Kaunas. During World War II, he helped Jews by forging documents and by finding safe places to hide. After the war, he was arrested by the Soviet NKVD and sentenced to ten years in Gulag. He returned to Lithuania in 1956 and lived in obscurity.

== Biography ==
=== Early life ===
Paukštys was born in Kurynė in the present-day Kazlų Rūda Municipality. He was the ninth child in the family. He studied at a primary school in Lekėčiai and a progymnasium in Kaunas. He received a teacher's license and began teaching in 1911. In 1918, he completed teachers' courses in Kaunas and taught at primary schools in Švediškiai and Jankai.

=== Salesian ===
In 1925, at the age of 28, he learned about the Salesians of Don Bosco and decided to join them. Together with his brother Juozas and eight other Lithuanians, he traveled to Italy. After two years, he entered the novitiate and became the Salesian in 1928. He then studied philosophy at the Valsalice Salesian High School in Turin. In 1929, he published a six-act drama Sūnus vėjavaikis (The Prodigal Son) in Marijampolė. After the graduation, he spent a year in Borgomanero and two years in Turin where he helped editing the Salesian publication Saleziečių žinios. In 1931–1935, Paukštys studied theology at the Salesian Theologate of La Crocetta in Turin and was ordained as a priest in July 1935.

Paukštys returned to Lithuania in 1937 and became an administrator of the Salesian center in Vytėnai (now known as Pilis I). At the same time, he taught Lithuanian language and literature at the Salesian school. He was then assigned to Saldutiškis and to the Church of the Holy Trinity, Kaunas. He returned to Vytėnai as a confessor.

=== Rescue of Jews ===
He was rector of the St. Michael the Archangel Church, Kaunas in 1940–1942 and the dean of the Holy Trinity Parish in Kaunas in 1942–1946. He forged birth certificates and baptismal records for the Jews from the Kovno Ghetto, particularly for children. It is estimated that he helped about 120 Jewish children. He also sheltered adults (about 25 people) hiding them in a church or his office until a safer location was found with farmers in Suvalkija. In a 1963 letter, Paukštys recalled that he hid from the German Gestapo on three occasions and estimated that he spent 6,000 or 7,000 Reichsmarks helping 200 Jews. He was aided by his brother Juozas who was also recognized as the Righteous Among the Nations.

His rescue efforts were described by Hirsh Osherovitsh in The Black Book of Soviet Jewry. He was posthumously recognized as the Righteous Among the Nations in 1977 and awarded the Life Saving Cross in 1999.

=== Soviet persecution ===
In August 1946, Paukštys was arrested by the Soviet NKVD, accused of aiding the anti-Soviet Lithuanian partisans, and sent to Gulag camps for ten years. Hard physical labor, including as a stone crusher in road construction, damaged his health. He returned from Omsk to Lithuania in April 1956 and briefly served as an altarista in Alytus. After delivering a sermon which was deemed to be anti-Soviet, he was forced into hiding. He finally became a vicar in Simnas in 1964. He died in December 1966 in Kaunas and was buried in Sutkai.
