= Hirsch Schwartzberg =

Lithuanian Holocaust survivor (1907–1987)

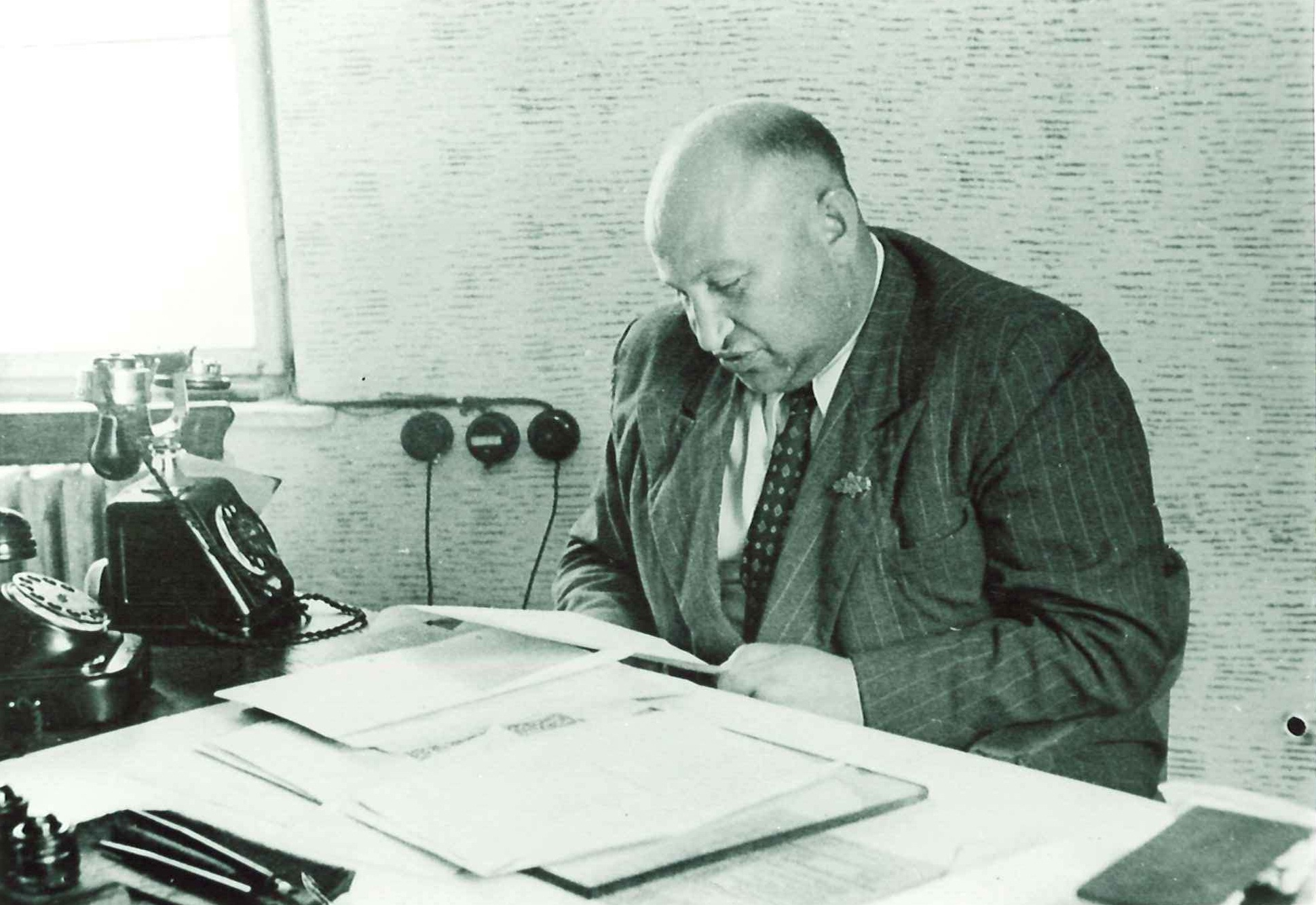
- Schwartzberg in the Düppel-Center Office
- Born: 28 October 1907; Vilna, Russian Empire (now Vilnius, Lithuania)
- Died: 17 October 1987 (aged 79); Ashdod, Israel
- Monuments: YIVO
- Occupations: truck business, Jewish DP leader, farmer in Vineland, New Jersey, USA
- Known for: Leading Holocaust surviving Jewish refugees in Berlin
- Political party: none
- Spouse: Rivkah Schwartzberg

Hirsch Schwartzberg (Szwarcberg, Schwarzberg) (28 October 1907, in Vilna – 17 October 1987 in Ashdod) was a Jewish leader of Holocaust survivors (Hebrew: שארית הפּליטה) under the American occupation of Berlin.

== Holocaust ==
All of Schwartzberg's family were murdered in the Holocaust except for himself, his wife, and their son. Together they survived the Vilna Ghetto. A couple weeks before its final liquidation in September 1943, they – along with a few hundred other Jews from the ghetto – escaped by obtaining permits to work in Karl Plagge's hastily expanded HKP 562 forced labor camp on Subačiaus Street in Vilnius. HKP562 served a few workshops spread out through Vilnius; one of its main tasks was retrofitting small trucks to use wood as fuel. At the workshop to which Schwartzberg was assigned, he served as the workers’ spokesman.

The survival rate at HKP562 was higher than in the liquidated Vilna ghetto. Yet Plagge and his more benevolent officers could not avert the final outcome: Most of the Jewish workers of the HKP were murdered – mainly by Ukrainian and Estonian SS forces – in July 1944, before Soviet troops occupied Vilna/Vilnius. Schwartzberg, with wife and son, survived by switching to new hiding places during the night – as their previous hideouts got discovered, and pursuing forces murdered Jews they caught. Most of those hideouts were makeshift and often overcrowded, increasing their likelihood of discovery.

== Soviet occupation of Lithuania, move to Berlin ==
For the Schwartzbergs and other surviving Jews, the subsequent Soviet occupation was a liberation. Yet Vilnius/Vilna, before the German invasion, was populated mainly by ethnic Poles and Jews. After the Nazi genocide in Lithuania, Vilna Jewish society – and the community that had nurtured Schwartzberg – no longer existed. So, after the Schwartzbergs recuperated – and as the Red Army proceeded westward towards Berlin – Schwartzberg and his family also left Vilnius and moved west. They arrived in Szczecin, Poland, and then – three weeks after the German capitulation – in Berlin.

Another calculation in Schwartzberg's decision to leave his hometown of Vilna was to avoid the Soviets’ forced migration east of many people – including surviving Jews – from Lithuania. On arrival in East Berlin, Schwartzberg lied about his place of birth, claiming he and his family were from Lodz, Poland. Stalin was, at that time, deporting people from Lithuania and the other Baltic states, often shipping them east into the Soviet Union.

== Jewish leader in Berlin ==
Schwartzberg was president of the Central Committee of Jewish Displaced Persons in Berlin. He controlled activities of two adjoining displaced-person camps in Berlin, in Düppel and Mariendorf. As a witness remembers, in the years of his leadership there was no riots or violence in the camps.

== Migration to the United States ==
In February 1949 Schwartzberg, and his wife and son, immigrated to the United States, where they operated a poultry farm.
