= International Commission for the Evaluation of the Crimes of the Nazi and Soviet Occupation Regimes in Lithuania =

- Formation: September 7, 1998
- Type: Government commission
- Purpose: Investigate crimes during the occupation of Lithuania (1940–1990)
- Chairman: Emanuelis Zingeris
- Affiliations: Platform of European Memory and Conscience
- Website: komisija.lt

The International Commission for the Evaluation of the Crimes of the Nazi and Soviet Occupation Regimes in Lithuania is a commission appointed by the President of Lithuania, Valdas Adamkus, by presidential decree on 7 September 1998. The Commission is tasked with investigating the crimes committed during the occupation of Lithuania by the Soviet Union and Germany that lasted from 14 June 1940 to 11 March 1990. The commission consists of two subcommissions, each dealing with the 48 years of Soviet occupation and the 3 years of German occupation respectively. The Chairman of the Commission is Emanuelis Zingeris MP (since 1998). The Commission is a member institution of the European Union's Platform of European Memory and Conscience.

The commission managed to hire Yitzhak Arad, an Israeli Holocaust scholar and founding director of Yad Vashem. However in April 2006, the daily newspaper Respublika called Arad a war criminal for having fought against the Nazis on the side of the Soviets, and the state prosecutor opened an investigation into Arad. Part of the investigation was dropped in 2008 after an international outcry. Arad resigned from the commission. The British historian Martin Gilbert also resigned from the commission, protesting the treatment of Arad.

In 2012, financing of the commission was renewed by presidential decree by President Dalia Grybauskaitė and new commission members appointed. The new commission members include Dina Porat and Arkadiy Zeltser (both of Yad Vashem), Andrew Baker (of the American Jewish Committee), Saulius Sužiedėlis (of Millersville University), Kęstutis Grinius (of Vilnius University), Alexander Daniel (of Memorial), Nicolas Lane (of the American Jewish Committee), Timothy D. Snyder (of Yale University), Françoise Thom (of Sorbonne University), Janos M. Rainer, and Arvydas Anušauskas (chairman of the Seimas Committee on National Security and Defense). Emanuelis Zingeris was again appointed chairman of the commission.

== See also ==
- Genocide and Resistance Research Centre of Lithuania
