= Petras Baublys =

Lithuanian pediatrician (1914–1973

- Born: 23 May 1914; Lida, Russian Empire
- Died: 16 December 1973 (aged 59); Near Karacharovo, Russian SFSR, Soviet Union
- Burial place: Antakalnis Cemetery
- Education: Vytautas Magnus University
- Occupation: Pediatrician
- Children: Alis Baublys
- Awards: Righteous Among the Nations

Petras Baublys (23 May 1914 – 16 December 1973) was a Lithuanian pediatrician and university professor.

Baublys graduated from Vytautas Magnus University in 1936. During World War II, he was the director of an orphanage and helped rescue Jewish children from the Kovno Ghetto. He was recognized as the Righteous Among the Nations in 1977. After the war, he moved to Vilnius where he lectured at Vilnius University (1944–1973) and was the chief pediatrician of the Ministry of Health (1950–1958). He published numerous medical articles and became a candidate of medical sciences in 1969. He died on 16 December 1973 in the crash of Aeroflot Flight 2022 from Vilnius to Moscow.

== Biography ==
Baublys was born on 23 May 1914 in Lida to a family of teachers. He was the youngest of six sons. He graduated from Kaunas Aušra Gymnasium and enrolled at the Vytautas Magnus University to study medicine. He graduated with distinction in 1936. He then worked at a tuberculosis sanatorium of the Lithuanian Red Cross and as an assistant at the pediatric department at his alma mater.

During the German occupation, from 1942 to 1944, Baublys was the director of the orphanage Lopšelis which was located near the Kovno Ghetto. Baublys agreed to rescue and hide Jewish children from the ghetto. Aided by a network of supporters, he would take in the children as orphans or foundlings, forge documents, and place older children with Lithuanian families, mainly with farmers in Suvalkija. About 20 names of rescued children are known, but the full scope of the rescue operation remains unknown.

In 1944, Baublys moved to Vilnius where he became a lecturer at Vilnius University; he continued to teach at the university until his death. From 1944 to 1954, he headed the university's Department of Infectious and Pediatric Diseases. From 1950 to 1958, he was the chief pediatrician of the Ministry of Health. From 1958 to 1973, he worked at the Vilnius City Clinical Hospital. Baublys became a candidate of medical sciences in 1969.

On 16 December 1973, Baublys and three other Lithuanian doctors traveled to a conference in Kharkiv. Due to poor weather, their flight to Kharkiv was cancelled but they rebooked tickets to Moscow. Their Aeroflot Flight 2022 crashed in Moscow Oblast killing all aboard. His remains were cremated in Moscow and the urn with ashes was buried in Antakalnis Cemetery.

== Publications ==
Baublys was long-term member of the editorial teams of the Lithuanian medical journal Sveikatos apsauga and the Russian journal Pediatrics (Журнал "Педиатрия" имени Г.Н.Сперанского). He authored some 150 medical articles. His bibliography was compiled and published in 1994.

He also published the following books on child care:

- Textbook Vaikų ligos (Children's Diseases), one of coauthors (1962, 2nd edition in 1976)
- Motina ir vaikas (Mother and Child), co-authored with Jonas Neniškis (1958)
- Vaikas auga (The Child Grows), co-authored with Liudmila Steponaitienė (1965, 2nd edition in 1969)
- Kad gimtų sveiki vaikai (For Birth of Healthy Children) (1969)
- Mano vaikas (My Child), co-authored with Liudmila Steponaitienė (1974)

== Legacy ==
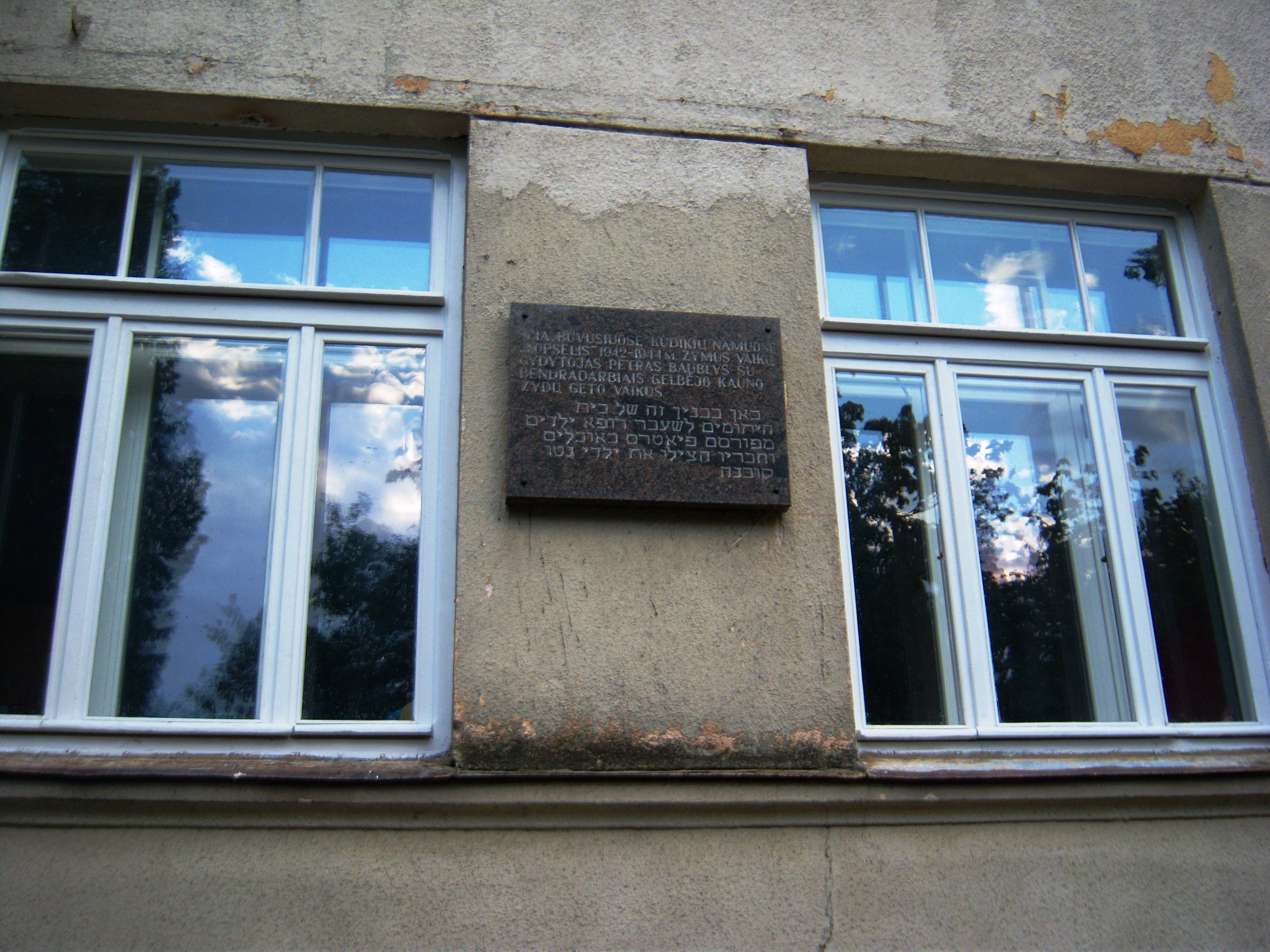
Memorial plaque at Kaunas Clinics

For his actions rescuing Jewish children, Baublys was posthumously recognized as the Righteous Among the Nations by Yad Vashem in 1977. At the same time, his brother Sergejus and sister-in-law Jadvyga were recognized for hiding Jewish children in their home. In 1993, he was also awarded the Lithuanian Life Saving Cross.

In 1984, a short biography of Baublys, Ateik vėl, daktare (Come Again, Doctor), was published by Vladas Minius.

In 1994, a memorial plaque was installed at the former Lopšelis orphanage in Kaunas (present-day part of Kaunas Clinics). In May 2014, a memorial plaque was affixed to the former home of Baublys in Antakalnis.

A street near Vilnius University Hospital Santaros Clinics is named after Baublys.
