= Petras Ciunis =

Lithuanian army officer (1898–1979)

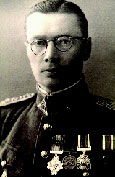
Petras Ciunis in 1939

Petras Ciunis (June 26, 1898 in Perloja – December 29, 1979 in Vilnius) was a Lithuanian army officer, educator.

== Biography ==
=== Lithuanian Wars of Independence ===
In 1918, Ciunis graduated from Voronezh Teachers' Seminary (a subsidiary of Tartu University at the time). In February 1919, he volunteered for the 1st Infantry Regiment of the Lithuanian Army. In June of the same year he started education at the War School of Kaunas. Upon graduation he was assigned to the 1st Infantry Regiment as company chief.

=== Interbellum ===
In July 1925, he graduated from the high courses for officers and became logistics and later drill company chief in the 1st Infantry Regiment in Ukmergė. In 1926 he became a captain. In 1933 he was transferred to the Lithuanian Riflemen Union, and in 1935 to Trakai military district.

=== World War 2 ===
==== First occupation of Lithuania ====
At the time of the Soviet Union's occupation of Lithuania in 1940, Ciunis was chief of the 2nd Company of the 2nd Infantry Regiment. The only opportunity to prevent Soviets from deporting the whole Ciunis family to Siberia was to donate most of the family estates to the state and join the Soviet military. In September 1940, he was assigned to the 2nd Company, 1st Battalion, 259th Rifle Regiment of the Red Army (RA). In December of the same year he was assigned to the 619th Artillery Regiment of the 184th Rifle Division, and became chief of the chemical warfare company.

In June 1941, Ciunis became chief specialist of the 179th Rifle Division for chemical warfare. As Operation Barbarossa started, German Army Groups North and Centre invaded the Lithuanian territory. This gave an opportunity for the brief anti-Soviet June Uprising. Reportedly, Ciunis did not directly participate in the uprising, but helped by sabotaging the RA.

As the events of war progressed, Ciunis found himself retreating with the remains of the RA 29th Rifle Corps to the depths of Russia. In August 1941, he was sent to the Soviet officers' academy „Bыстрел“ (Russian: Bыстрел, romanized: Vistrel) in Solnechnogorsk. Afterward he became a professor at the 2nd war academy in Omsk. As the 'Lithuanian' division was formed, Ciunis was assigned to it as chief chemical warfare specialist.

=== After the war ===
In 1946, Ciunis was assigned to Vilnius University as the chief lecturer in military faculty. In 1950 he retired from military service as a lieutenant colonel. From October 1950 to 1964, he headed the Vilnius regional library (now the Vilnius County Adomas Mickevičius Public Library).

Ciunis died in 1979 and is buried in Antakalnis Cemetery in Vilnius.

== Decorations ==
- 1928 – Lithuanian Independence Medal, Volunteer Medal
- 1929 – Lithuanian Order of the Lithuanian Grand Duke Gediminas, Officer's cross
- 1939 – Lithuanian Riflemen's Star
- 1944 – Soviet Order of the Red Star
- 1945 – Soviet Medal "For the Victory over Germany in the Great Patriotic War 1941–1945"
