= Riflemen's Star =

Military decoration on Lithuania

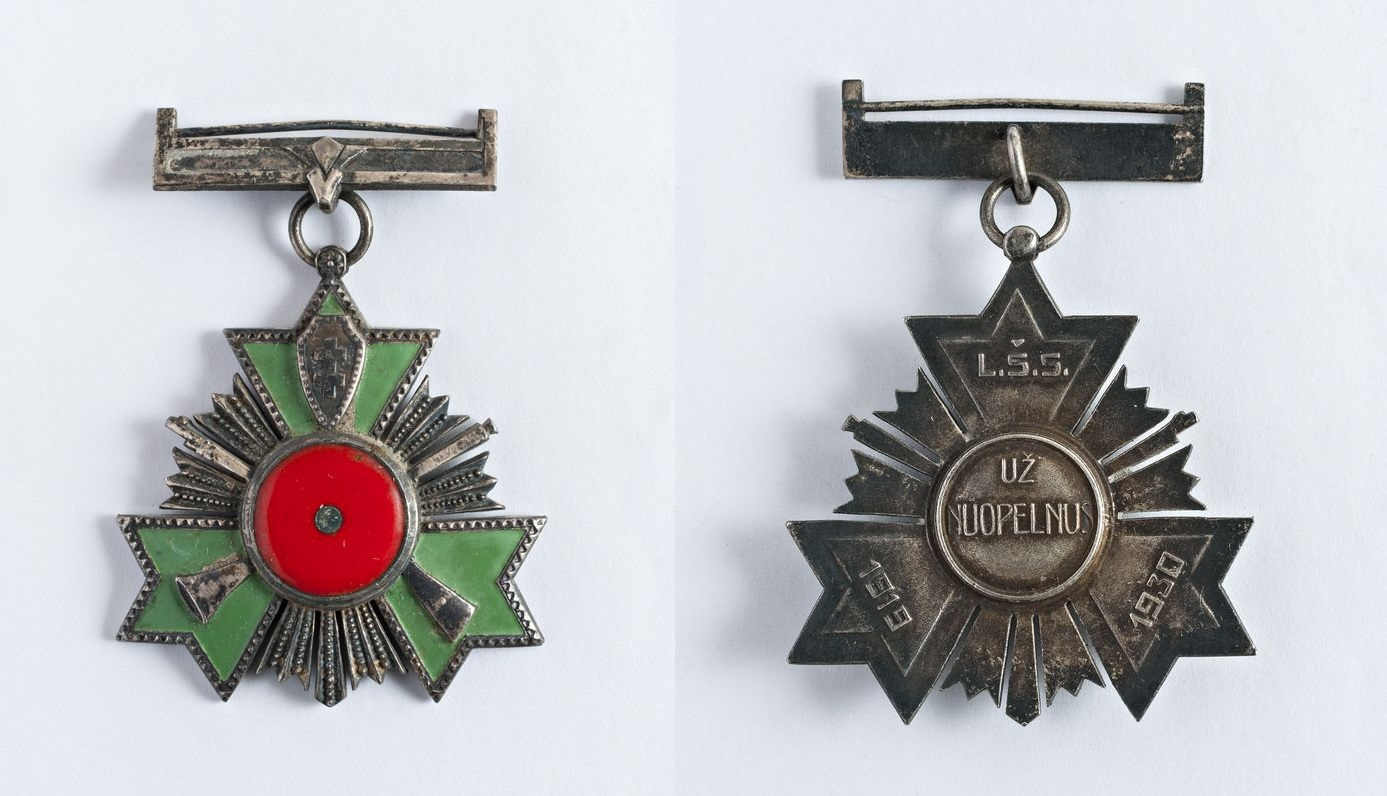
The Star of the award

Riflemen's Star (Lithuanian: Šaulių žvaigždė) is a decoration bestowed by the Minister of National Defence of the Republic of Lithuania. The star is awarded to distinguished members of the Lithuanian Riflemen's Union, other citizens of Lithuania and foreign countries for merits to the Riflemen's Union and the Republic of Lithuania. The Riflemen's star is recognised as an order.

== History ==
The idea of an award for the members of the Lithuanian Riflemen's Union was raised in 1927, before the tenth anniversary of the Union. However, the description and the statute of the order was approved only in 1930. The star was designed by the sculptor Petras Rimša. The first stars were awarded on 24 June 1931. 892 people received the award in interwar Lithuania. The bronze Riflemen's Star Medal was established in 1939 for the 20th anniversary of the Riflemen and was awarded to 2,156 people. The order was reestablished in 1991 along with other orders, decorations, and medals of Lithuania. Initially, it was awarded on behalf of the Seimas. Since 2003, it is awarded on behalf of the Ministry of National Defence.

== Description ==
Ribbon bar of the Riflemen's Star

The Riflemen's Star measures 44 millimetres (1.7 in) in diameter. It consists of three petal-shaped rays, resembling a lily, coated in green enamel, upon a silver sun. The top middle vertical ray depicts the Cross of the Jagiellons, one of the varieties of the Cross of Lorraine found on the coat of arms of Lithuania and used by the Riflemen's Union as its logo. Two other rays depict a rifle stock and a bell of a trumpet. A shield with the coat of arms of Lithuania is placed in the middle of the order. The reverse has inscriptions LŠS (Lithuanian acronym for the Riflemen's Union), dates 1919 (establishment of the union), 1930 (establishment of the order), and Už nuopelnus (For Merits).

The ribbon bar of the order is dark green with two white bands on the sides and a red band in the middle. The same ribbon is used in the flag of the Riflemen's Union.

== Bestowal ==
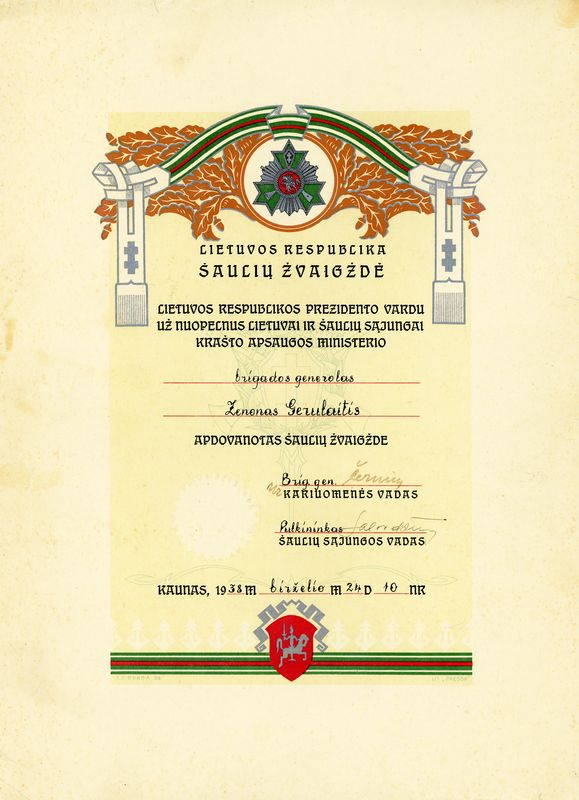
Recipient certificate from 1938

The Riflemen's Star is bestowed by Minister of National Defence on behalf of the leader of the Riflemen's Union. The Riflemen's Star is awarded to:

riflemen who, upon received a responsible role in the Riflemen Union, showed exceptional organisational talents,
riflemen privates who showed honesty, determination, and resilience,
citizens who merited the Riflemen Union or the Republic of Lithuania,
riflemen and citizens of foreign countries may be awarded the Riflemen's Star for showing significant benevolence to the Lithuanian Riflemen's Union.

Riflemen are awarded during the following national holidays:

16 February (Act of Independence of Lithuania)
24 June (Riflemen Day)
6 July (Statehood Day)
23 November (Lithuanian Military Day)

In special cases, the Riflemen's Star may be awarded on other dates. The same decoration is not awarded twice to the same person. A certificate of decoration is received with the star. People awarded with Riflemen's Star have the right to wear it on the uniform as well as civilian clothing.

== Notable recipients ==
- Antanas Žmuidzinavičius (1931)
- Mykolas Kalmantas (1931, 1939)
- Lauri Malmberg
- Stasys Raštikis
- Antanas Gustaitis (1939)
- Petras Ciunis (1939)
- Bernardas Brazdžionis (1996)
- Valdas Adamkus
