= Emanuelis Zingeris =

Lithuanian politician (born 1957)

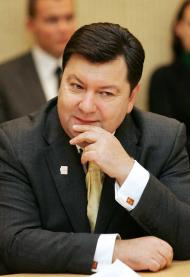

Member of the Seimas
- Incumbent
- Assumed office 15 November 2004
- Constituency: Multi-member
- In office 25 November 1996 – 17 October 2000
- Constituency: Multi-member
- In office 25 November 1992 – 24 November 1996
- Preceded by: Liudvikas Saulius Razma
- Succeeded by: Vytenis Andriukaitis
- Constituency: Žirmūnai

Vice President of the Parliamentary Assembly of the Council of Europe
- Incumbent
- Assumed office 2009

Chairman of the Foreign Affairs Committee of the Seimas
- Incumbent
- Assumed office 2010

President of the Parliamentary Forum of the Community of Democracies
- Incumbent
- Assumed office 2010

Chairman of the International Commission for the Evaluation of the Crimes of the Nazi and Soviet Occupation Regimes in Lithuania
- Incumbent
- Assumed office 1998

Personal details
- Born: 16 July 1957 (age 69) Kaunas, Lithuania
- Party: Homeland Union; European People's Party
- Spouse: Virginija Zingeris
- Children: Dovydas and Estera Zingeris

Emanuelis Zingeris (born 16 July 1957) is a Lithuanian philologist, museum director, politician, signatory of the 1990 Act of the Re-Establishment of the State of Lithuania, currently serving as a Member of the Seimas (1990–2000 and since 2004), chairman of its foreign affairs committee (since 2010), Vice President of the Parliamentary Assembly of the Council of Europe (since 2009) and President of the Parliamentary Forum of the Community of Democracies (since 2010). A Lithuanian Jew, he has been director of the Vilna Gaon Jewish State Museum, honorary chairman of Lithuania's Jewish community, and is Chairman of the International Commission for the Evaluation of the Crimes of the Nazi and Soviet Occupation Regimes in Lithuania. He is a founding signatory of the Prague Declaration on European Conscience and Communism, that proposed the establishment of the European Day of Remembrance for Victims of Stalinism and Nazism.

== Early life and education ==
Zingeris graduated from Vilnius University in 1981 with a degree in philology. Himself being Jewish, he wrote his post-graduate dissertation on the Jewish cultural heritage of Lithuania, a difficult subject at the time.

== Political career ==
Zingeris was a member of the pro-independence Sąjūdis movement and was elected to the Seimas (parliament) in 1990, where he served as chair of both the foreign affairs committee and the human rights committee, and as a member of several interparliamentary relations groups.

Zingeris failed to be reelected in 2000, and served as director of the Vilna Gaon Jewish State Museum, which he helped found, from 2000 to 2004. In 2004, he returned to parliament. Having formerly been a member of the Social Democratic Party, he is now representing the Homeland Union – Lithuanian Christian Democrats and the European People's Party at the European level.

Zingeris was honorary chairman of the Lithuanian Jewish Community, but resigned from this position in 1997 after he was elected chairman of the Lithuanian Parliamentary Committee on Human and Civic Rights and National Minorities, stating that he was "thus bound to have concern for all national minorities". In 1998, he was appointed chairman of the International Commission for the Evaluation of the Crimes of the Nazi and Soviet Occupation Regimes in Lithuania by President Valdas Adamkus.

In addition to his role in parliament, Zingeris has chaired the Lithuanian delegation to the Parliamentary Assembly of the Council of Europe (PACE) in 2009 and is one of the Vice Presidents of PACE. In this capacity, he has been serving as the Assembly's rapporteur on the case of Boris Nemtsov since 2020. In 2023, was appointed the Assembly's General Rapporteur on the Situation of Human Rights Defenders and Whistleblowers.

Zingeris has also chaired both the Lithuanian and Israeli inter-parliamentary group, and the Lithuanian and American inter-parliamentary group. In 2010, he was also elected President of the Parliamentary Forum of the Community of Democracies.

He is a founding signatory of the Prague Declaration on European Conscience and Communism.

== Recognitions ==
- Order of the Lithuanian Grand Duke Gediminas
- Order of Merit of the Federal Republic of Germany
- Order of Merit of the Republic of Poland
- Order of Merit of Ukraine

== Family ==
Zingeris is married and has a son and a daughter. His brother Markas Zingeris, a well-known writer and poet who headed the Vilna Gaon Museum from 2005 to 2019, died on April 20 April 2023. Emanuelis Zingeris speaks Lithuanian, Yiddish, Polish, German, English and Russian.
