= Order for Merits to Lithuania =

Order for Merits to Lithuania Ordinas Už nuopelnus Lietuvai'
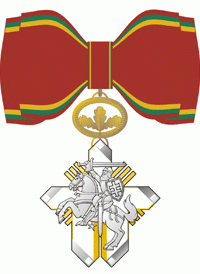
- Women's Commander's Cross for Humanitarian Contributions
- Type: 5 Class State Order
- Awarded for: Special merits to Lithuania
- Presented by: Lithuania
- Eligibility: Citizens of Lithuania and foreign nationals
- Established: 18 June 2002
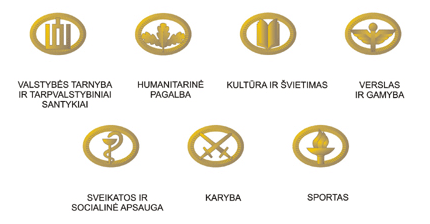
- Devices showing the area for which the award is made

Precedence
- Next (higher): Order of the Lithuanian Grand Duke Gediminas
- Next (lower): Life Saving Cross
- Related: Medal of the Order for Merits to Lithuania

The Order for Merits to Lithuania (Lithuanian: Ordinas Už nuopelnus Lietuvai) is an award, presented by the President of Lithuania, which may be conferred on the citizens of Lithuania and foreign nationals for distinguished services promoting name of Lithuania, expanding a develop international relationships, for distinguished merits in social, culture, science, business, sport, military and in other areas. The award is presented in five classes, in ascending order, Knight, Officer, Commander, Grand Commander, and Grand Cross.

== Appearance ==
The insignia of all of the classes contains a five-pointed cross is made of gold and covered with white enamel varying in size depending on the grade of the award. An oxidized silver Vytis is centered on the Cross with rays between the edges. The reverse of the cross depicts the coats of arms of Vilnius, Kaunas, Klaipėda, Šiauliai, and Panevėžys. Inscribed in the center is "Pro Lituania" and 2002. The ribbon is red moiré, with yellow and green stripes at the edges. The cross is attached to the ribbon by a device which depicts the area for which the award was made.

- Columns of Gediminas: Civil Service and International Relations
- Three Oak Leaves: Humanitarian Aid
- An Open Book: Culture and Education
- Wings of Mercury: Business and Industry
- Staff of Aesculapius: Health Care and Social Welfare
- Crossed Swords: Military Affairs
- Torch: Sports

The rank of Grand Cross was awarded to Olympics swimming gold medalist Rūta Meilutytė on 10 August 2012 by Lithuanian President Dalia Grybauskaitė for her achievement in sports.

Order for Merits to Lithuania Ribbon Bars
Grand Cross	Grand Commander	Commander	Officer	Knight	Medal

A lesser award is the Medal of the Order for Merits to Lithuania. Recipients of the medal are not inducted into the Order for Merits to Lithuania.

== Recipients ==
- Recipients of the Order for Merits to Lithuania
