= HKP 562 forced labor camp =

Nazi concentration camp for Jews in Lithuania

- Nazi concentration camp
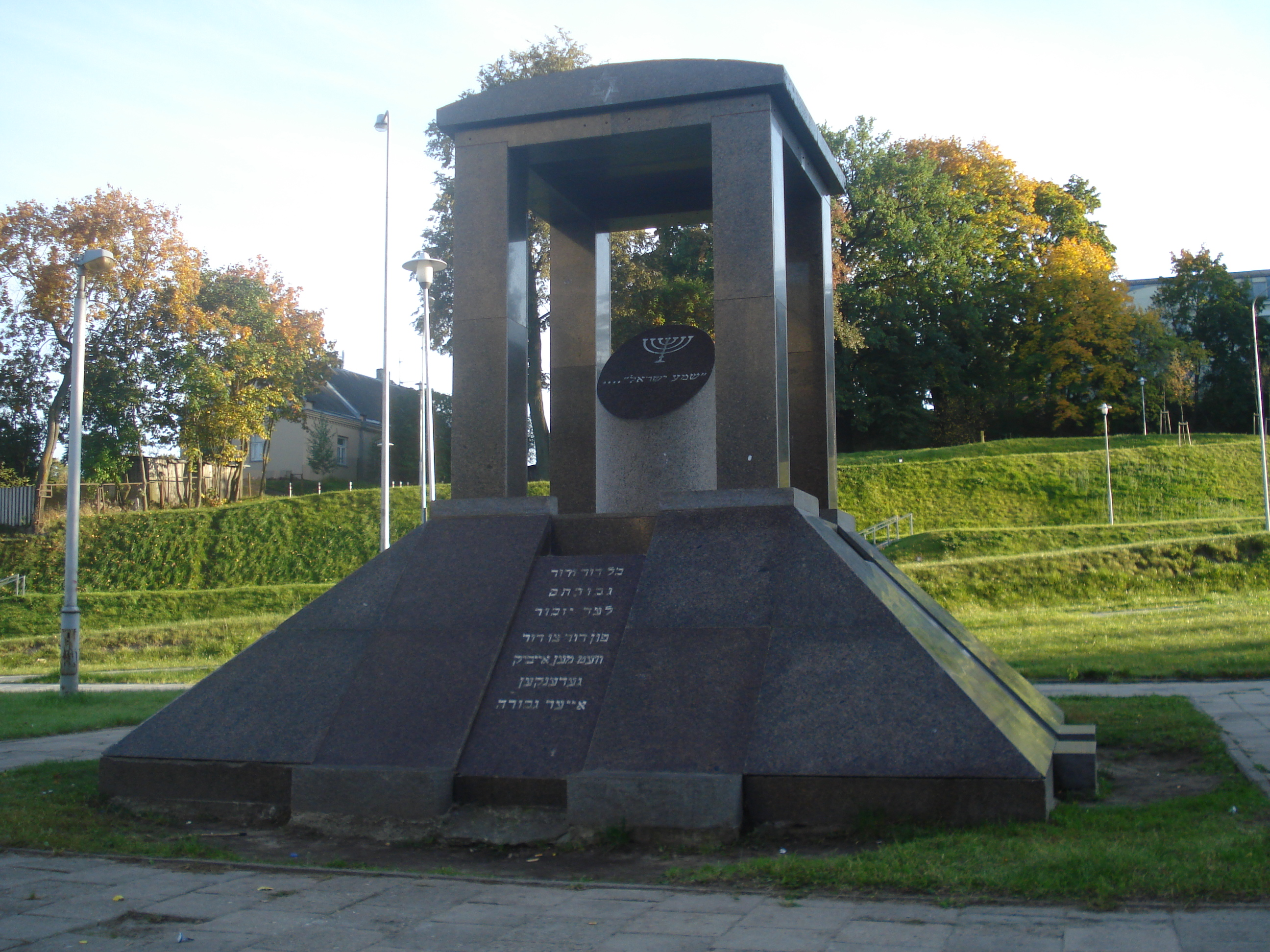
- A Holocaust memorial near the former camp, Subačiaus Street

- Location within Lithuania
- Coordinates: 54°40′34″N 25°18′18″E
- Known for: largest single group of Jewish survivors of the Holocaust in Vilnius
- Location: Vilnius, Lithuania
- Operated by: SS and Heereskraftfahrpark (HKP) 562 (Army Motor Vehicle Repair Park 562),
- Commandant: Major Karl Plagge
- Original use: apartment buildings
- Operational: 16 September 1943 – 3 July 1944
- Inmates: Jews
- Number of inmates: 1,234
- Killed: 750
- Liberated by: Red Army, July 1944
- Notable inmates: Hirsch Schwartzberg, Samuel Bak

HKP 562 was the site of a Nazi forced labor camp for Jews in Vilnius, Lithuania, during the Holocaust. It was centered around 47 & 49 Subačiaus Street, in apartment buildings originally built to house poor members of the Jewish community. The camp was used by the German army as a slave labor camp from September 1943 until July 1944.

During that interval, the camp was officially owned and administered by the SS, but run on a day-to-day basis by a Wehrmacht engineering unit, Heereskraftfahrpark (HKP) 562 (Army Motor Vehicle Repair Park 562), stationed in Vilnius. HKP 562's commanding officer, Major Karl Plagge, was sympathetic to the plight of his Jewish workers. Plagge and some of his men made efforts to protect the Jews of the camp from the murderous intent of the SS. It was partially due to the covert resistance to the Nazi policy of genocide toward the Jews by members of the HKP 562 engineering unit that over 250 Jewish men, women and children survived the final liquidation of the camp in July 1944, the single largest group of Jewish survivors of the Holocaust in Vilnius.

== Establishment ==
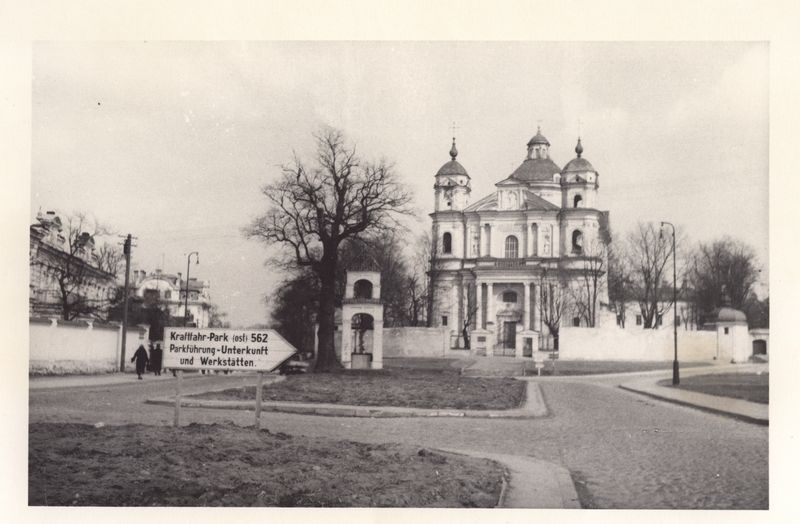
St. Peter and St. Paul's Church in Vilnius with a sign pointing to the HKP 562 forced labor camp

After having hired endangered Jews in the Vilna Ghetto to work in his unit's workshops from 1941 to 1943, thereby protecting the workers and their families from the murderous activities of the SS, the HKP camp was hastily erected in September 1943 when Plagge learned of the impending liquidation of the Vilna Ghetto, where all inhabitants were to be killed regardless of their work papers.

Plagge first traveled to Kaunas to the Wehrmacht headquarters and then to Riga to the SS administrative offices to argue on behalf of establishing a free-standing camp outside of the Vilna Ghetto. He met considerable resistance, especially from the SS, regarding this plan and his insistence that the women and children not be separated from the men, which he said would negatively affect worker morale and productivity. He was ultimately successful and on the evening of September 16, 1943, drove a convoy of trucks into the Vilna Ghetto and loaded more than 1,200 endangered Jewish ghetto residents onto his trucks and transported them to the relative safety of the newly erected HKP camp on Subocz (Subačiaus) Street.

The camp centered around two parallel residential houses built in 1898 by baron Hirsch for poor Jewish residents. The inhabitants were evicted by the Nazis in 1941 and later executed in the Paneriai massacre.

One week later the Vilna Ghetto was liquidated by the SS and its 15,000 remaining residents were either killed in the nearby killing grounds at Ponary or transported to concentration camps across Nazi-occupied Europe. Documents found by the Jewish Museum in Vilnius show that the camp housed 1,234 Jewish men, women and children. Initially, only men were employed in vehicle repair workshops in and around the camp; however, after an attempt was made by the SS to transfer the women and children to the Kaunas concentration camp in January 1944, Plagge engaged two clothing manufacturers to set up clothing repair shops in the top two floors of one of the apartment buildings and put the women and older children to work so that they would not appear to be idle to outside observers.

Plagge also gave orders that "the civilians are to be treated with respect", and thus the camp was largely free of the abuse and brutality found in most slave labor camps. Importantly, Plagge undertook great efforts to supplement the starvation-level rations for Polish and the even smaller rations for Jewish workers. While in the ghetto in Vilnius smuggling of food was punishable by death, under Plagge's command a blind eye was turned on the black market for food in the camp. Due to these measures no prisoner died of starvation in the camp. Similarly, the work hours were relatively humane, consisting of "only" twelve hours including a one-hour break.

In spite of the generally benign attitude of the officers and men of the HKP unit, the SS did enter the camp on several occasions and committed atrocities. Most notable was the Kinderaktion (an operation against the camp's children) on 27 March 1944, during which the SS, supervised by Martin Weiss, removed the vast majority of the 250 children living in the camp, who were then taken to their deaths.

== Liquidation ==
As the Red Army approached Vilnius in late June 1944, the Wehrmacht prepared to retreat. The Jewish prisoners in the camp were aware (having heard news reports from the BBC on covert radio sets) that whenever the Red Army liberated a Jewish slave-labor camp, they found all the inmates dead, having been shot by SS killing squads just before the Germans retreated. Thus many of the prisoners had been working on hiding places (called Malines) or escape plans in the months leading up to the summer of 1944. But they needed to know when the SS squads would arrive to exterminate the prisoners. On Saturday, 1 July 1944, Plagge entered the camp, with SS Oberscharfürhrer Richter at his side and made an informal speech as the camp's Jewish prisoners gathered around him. Plagge announced that he and his men had been ordered to withdraw to the west, and that he had not been able to obtain permission to take the workers with the unit; however he reassured them that the prisoners were to be relocated by the SS on Monday, July 3, and commented that they should not worry because they all knew that the SS was an organization devoted to the protection of refugees. With this covert warning, more than half the camp's prisoners went into hiding before the SS death squads arrived on 3 July 1944. The 500 prisoners who did appear at the roll call called by the SS were taken to the forest of Paneriai and shot. Over the next three days the SS searched the camp and its surroundings and succeeded in finding half of the missing prisoners; these 250 Jews were shot in the camp courtyard and behind Building 2. However, when the Red Army captured Vilnius a few days later, some 250 of the camp's Jews emerged from their hiding places and were the largest single group of Jewish survivors of the Holocaust in Vilnius.

After the end of the war, the apartment blocks were reverted to residential housing once more. After the restoration of the independence of Lithuania, commemorative plaques were installed on the buildings and a memorial was built nearby.

== Recent Research ==
In July and August 2017 a research team led by Richard Freund from the University of Hartford conducted archeological surveys of the former HKP camp site using non-invasive techniques such as ground penetrating radar, electric resistance tomography and drone-obtained high-resolution topographical maps. Their studies strongly supported the testimony which placed the location of a large mass grave from the final liquidation of the camp at the south end of the courtyard (under the current memorials as well as the parking area). They also confirmed the location of two pits in a trench near the outside wall of building number two (the western building) where witnesses reported that prisoners were shot and buried in a long trench along the side of the building. Additionally using drawings and written accounts of camp survivors the team was able to locate the "large maline" where 100 men, women and children succeeded in hiding during the final days of the camp and thus evaded the SS killing squads that descended on the camp on July 3–5, 1944.

A 2026 study of HKP 562 uses a recorded group interview from a 2010 reunion of former child prisoners in Tel Aviv to examine oral history and collective Holocaust memory. The study shows how survivors attempted to reconstruct a shared past decades after liberation, while correcting, interrupting, and challenging one another’s recollections. These tensions are interpreted not as simple failures of memory, but as part of the way traumatic experiences were remembered and negotiated collectively.

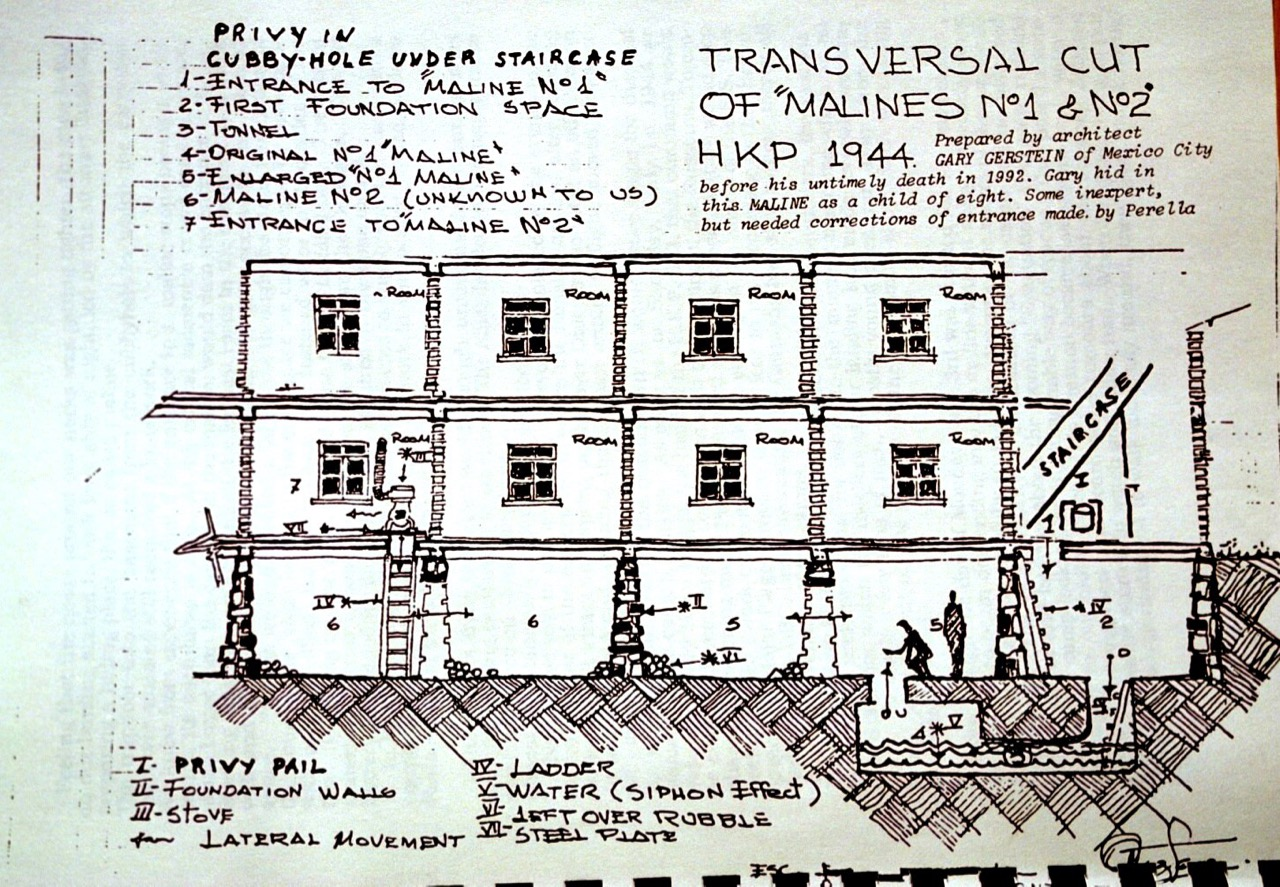
Sketch made by former HKP inmate Gary Gerstein, who was an 8-year-old child in July 1944. He later became an architect and drew this schematic of his hiding place with the help of his older cousin, Pearl Good, who also survived in this maline

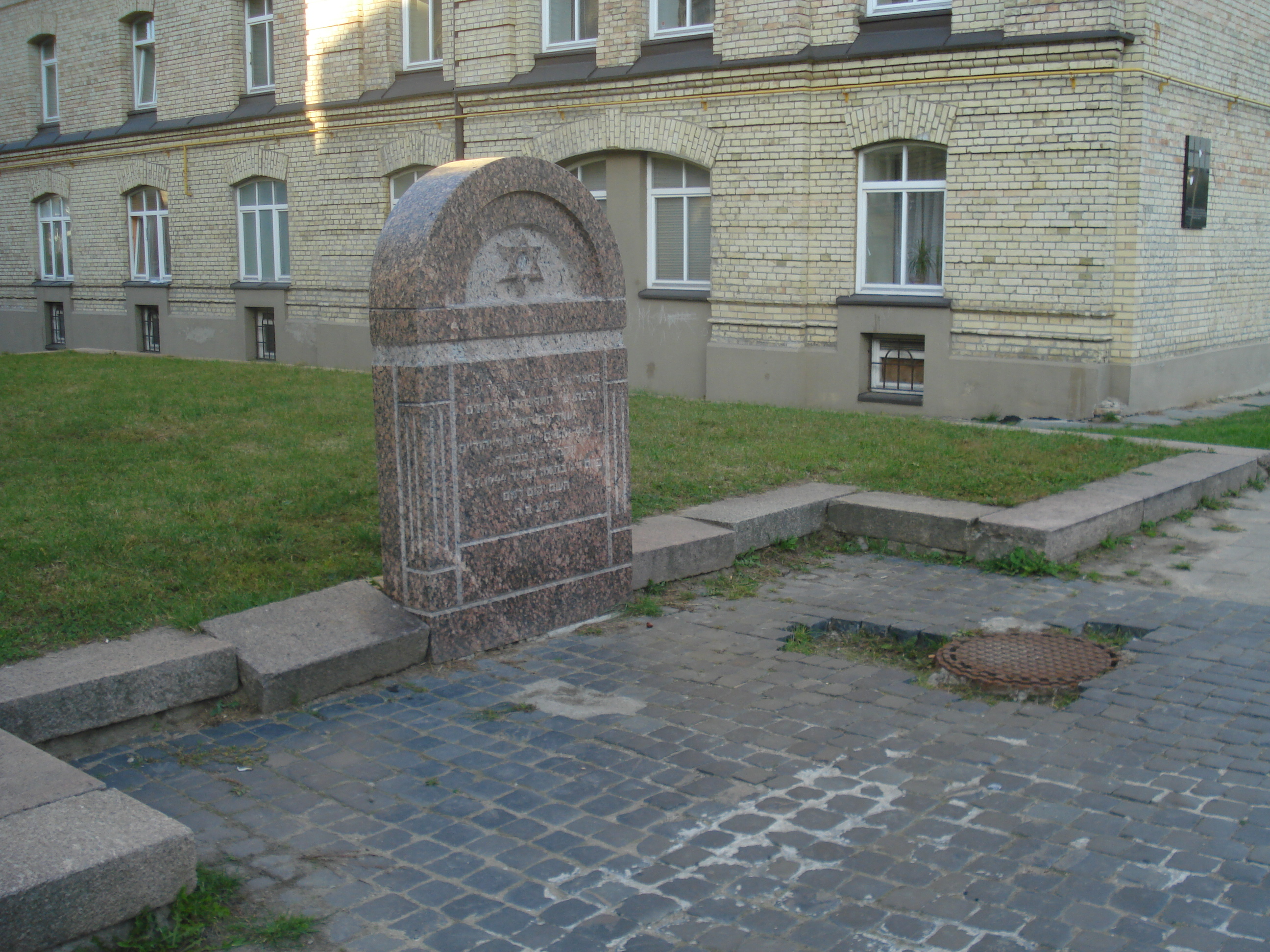
A memorial marking the burial site of Jews murdered at the former camp

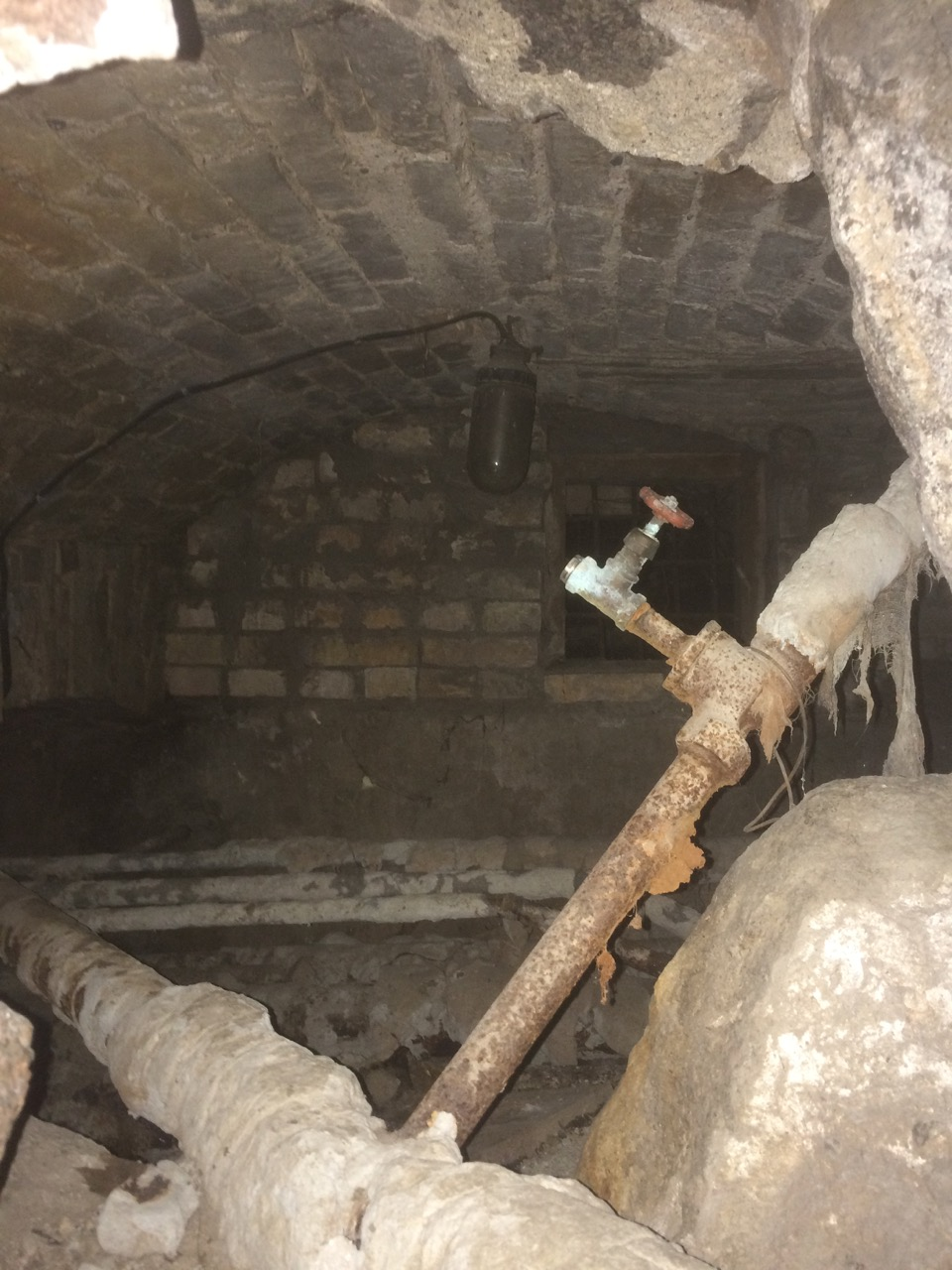
Interior of large maline found in 2017, corresponds to area 5 on Gary Gerstein's schematic of the maline

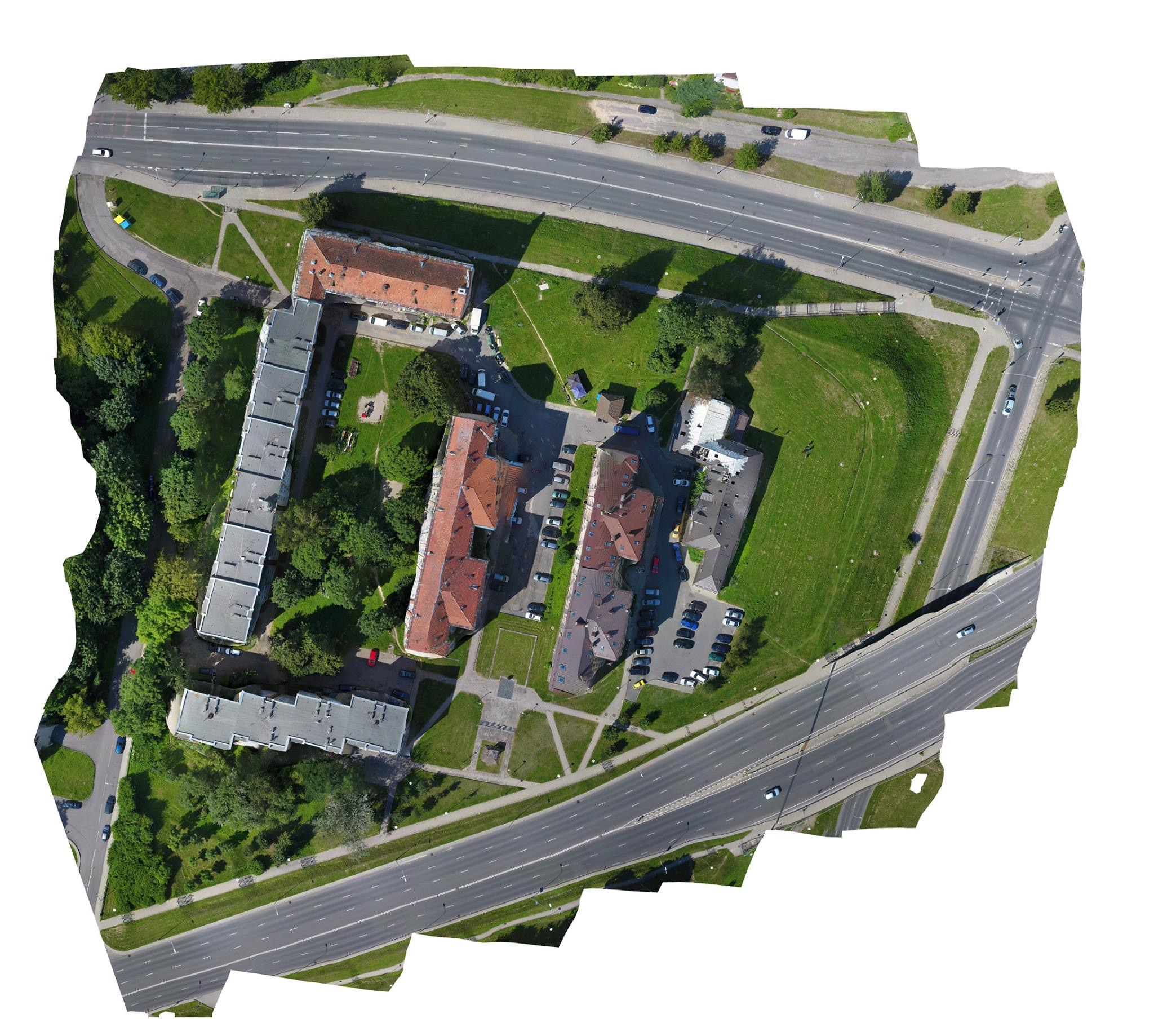
Drone obtained image of the former HKP Slave Labor Camp at 47-49 Subačiaus Street Vilnius

== Notable people ==
- Major Karl Plagge

Former Prisoners at HKP 562:

- Hirsch Schwartzberg, Jewish leader of Holocaust survivors (Yiddish: בפרייטה יידין אויף ברלין) under the American occupation of Berlin
- Samuel Bak
- Samuel Esterowicz
