= Life Saving Cross =

Life Saving Cross Žūvančiųjų gelbėjimo kryžius
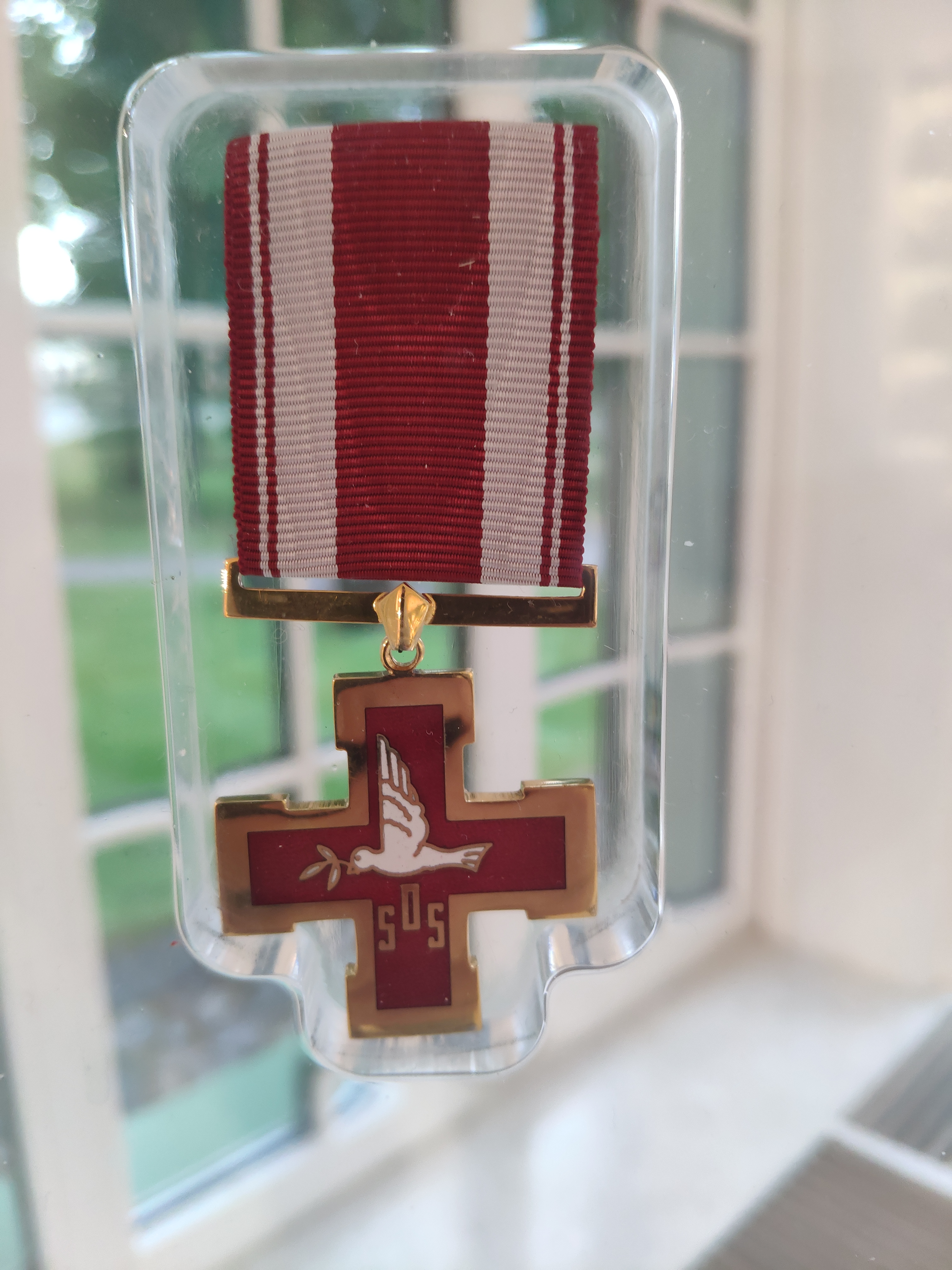

Awarded by President of Lithuania
- Type: State
- Established: 1930
- Country: Lithuania
- Awarded for: Life saving actions

Statistics
- Total inductees: 46 (1930–1940); 2,075 (1992–2026)
- Ribbon bar

The Life Saving Cross (Lithuanian: Žūvančiųjų gelbėjimo kryžius or previously Žūstančių gelbėjimo kryžius) is a state award of Lithuania awarded to those who rescue others despite danger to themselves. It is awarded by the President of Lithuania mainly to those who helped rescue Jews during the Holocaust in Lithuania.

== History ==
The cross was established in 1930 in interwar Lithuania and discontinued after the Soviet occupation of Lithuania in 1940. In the decade, it was awarded to 46 people, mostly those who rescued drowning persons.

The award was reestablished after Lithuania regained independence in 1990. The cross was first awarded on 23 September 1992 and it was initiated by Vytautas Landsbergis, chairman of the Supreme Council – Reconstituent Seimas, and Emanuelis Zingeris, director of the Jewish Museum. As of June 2026, it was awarded to 2,075 people.

== Recipients ==
In 1992–2025, 1,729 people received the award for rescuing Jews during the Holocaust in Lithuania. The Holocaust award ceremony usually takes place in September as 23 September (the day of the liquidation of Vilna Ghetto) is the Memorial Day for the Victims of the Holocaust in Lithuania.

Other people who received the award include persons who saved others from drowning, during fire or other disasters. For example, four local resident who alerted oncoming trains of the damaged bridge as a result of the Bražuolė bridge bombing received the cross in November 1994.

== Design ==
The award consists of a golden cross covered in red vitreous enamel. The obverse depicts a white peace dove carrying a laurel branch and has the gold inscription SOS underneath. The reverse side depicts a stylized knight from the coat of arms of Lithuania surrounded by the inscription "žūvančiųjų gelbėtojui" (to the rescuer of dying people) in capital letters. If the person receives more than one Life Saving Cross, the additional awards are indicated with a golden star attached to the ribbon. The cross measures 36 millimetres (1.4 in). The ribbon is of dark red moiré with two wide and two narrow white stripes at the edges. It measures 32 millimetres (1.3 in) in width.

During the interwar, the cross was produced by Arthus-Bertrand in Paris. Since 1992, it is produced in Lithuania.

== See also ==
- List of Lithuanian Righteous Among the Nations
