= Karl Plagge =

German military officer (1897–1957)

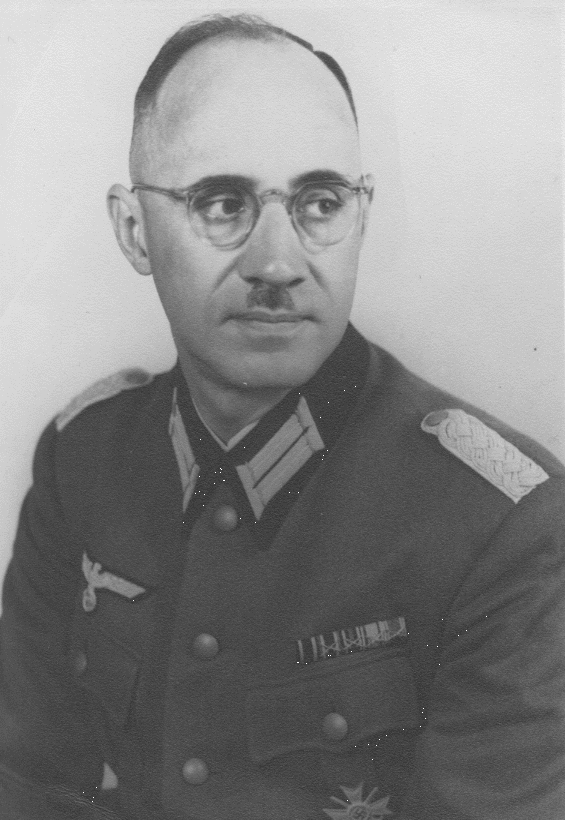
- Plagge in December 1943
- Born: 10 July 1897; Darmstadt, Grand Duchy of Hesse, German Empire
- Died: 19 June 1957 (aged 59); Darmstadt, West Germany
- Monuments: Major-Karl-Plagge barracks, Pfungstadt, Germany
- Education: Technische Hochschule Darmstadt
- Occupation: Mechanical engineer
- Known for: Rescuing Jews during the Holocaust
- Political party: Nazi Party
- Spouse: Anke Madsen
- Awards: Righteous Among the Nations
- Military career
- Allegiance: German Empire (to 1918); Weimar Republic (to 1933); Nazi Germany
- Branch: German Army
- Service years: 1939–1945
- Rank: Major
- Commands: HKP562
- Conflicts: World War I World War II
- Website: searchformajorplagge.com

Karl Plagge (pronounced [kaʁl ˈplaɡə]; 10 July 1897 – 19 June 1957) was a German officer who rescued Jews during the Holocaust in Lithuania by issuing work permits to non-essential workers. A partially disabled veteran of World War I, Plagge studied engineering and joined the Nazi Party in 1931 in hopes of helping Germany rebuild from the economic collapse following the war. After being dismissed from the position of lecturer for being unwilling to teach racism and his opposition to Nazi racial policies, he stopped participating in party activities in 1935 and left the party when the war broke out.

During World War II, he used his position as a staff officer in the German Army to employ and protect Jews in the Vilna Ghetto. At first, Plagge employed Jews who lived inside the ghetto, but when the ghetto was slated for liquidation in September 1943, he set up the HKP 562 forced labor camp, where he saved many male Jews by issuing them official work permits on the false premise that their holders' skills were vital for the German war effort, and also made efforts to save the worker's wives and children by claiming they would work better if their families were alive. Through these efforts he was able to protect over 1250 Jews from the genocide occurring in Vilna until the final days of the German occupation. Although unable to stop the SS from liquidating the remaining prisoners in July 1944, Plagge managed to warn the prisoners of the imminent arrival of SS killing squads, allowing about 200 to successfully hide from the SS and survive until the Red Army's capture of Vilnius. Of 100,000 pre-war Jews in Vilnius, only 2,000 survived, of which the largest single group were saved by Plagge.

Plagge was tried before an Allied denazification court in 1947, which accepted his plea to be classified as a "fellow traveler" of the Nazi Party, whose rescue activities were undertaken for humanitarian reasons rather than overt opposition to Nazism. Survivors he rescued testified on his behalf. Plagge died ten years after the trial.

According to historian Kim Priemel, the success of Plagge's rescue efforts was due to working within the system to save Jews, a position that required him to enter a "grey zone" of moral compromise. In 2000, the story of his rescues was uncovered by the son of a survivor of HKP 562. In 2005, after two unsuccessful petitions, the Holocaust memorial Yad Vashem recognized him as one of the "Righteous Among the Nations".

== Early life and education ==
Plagge was born to a Prussian family in Darmstadt, Germany, on 10 July 1897; many of his ancestors had been military doctors. Plagge's father died in 1904, leaving Plagge, his mother, and his older sister.

After graduating from Ludwig-Georgs-Gymnasium, where a bust and memorial plaque honor him today, a secondary school that focused on the classics, Plagge was drafted into the Imperial German Army. He fought as a lieutenant in World War I on the Western Front, participating in the battles of the Somme, Verdun, and Flanders. Imprisoned in a British prisoner-of-war camp from 1917 to 1920, he caught polio and became disabled in his left leg.

Upon his release, Plagge studied chemical engineering at the Technische Universität Darmstadt, graduating in 1924. He had wanted to study medicine but was prevented from the longer study program required due to his family's financial problems. After graduating, he married Anke Madsen, but the couple had to live with his mother due to their finances. Unemployed, he ran a pharmaceutical laboratory from the house.

== Interwar period ==
He was ideologically a national conservative, but joined the Nazi Party on 1 December 1931. Many years later, during his denazification trial, Plagge stated that he was initially drawn to the promises of Adolf Hitler and the Nazi Party to rebuild the German economy and national pride, which suffered during the years that Germany experienced after the signing of the Treaty of Versailles. Between 1931 and 1933, Plagge worked as a local organizer for the party.

He came into conflict with the leadership of the party after 1933 when Hitler seized power. According to his later testimony, Plagge refused to accept Nazi racial theories, which he considered unscientific, and was disgusted by the persecution of political opponents and the corruption of many Nazi functionaries. Instead of leaving the party, he attempted to effect change from within, accepting a position as a scientific lecturer and leader of a Nazi educational institute in Darmstadt. Because he refused to teach Nazi racial ideology, he was dismissed from his position in 1935. A local party official accused Plagge of being on good terms with Jews and Freemasons, treating Jews in his home laboratory, and opposing the Nazi boycott of Jewish businesses, threatening to bring Plagge before a party tribunal. Instead, Plagge ceased his activity with the party, disenchanted with Nazism.

In 1934, Plagge began to work at Hessenwerks, an engineering company run by Kurt Hesse, whose wife Erica was half-Jewish. By hiring a nominal Nazi, Hesse hoped to prevent the "Aryanization" of his business. After Kristallnacht in 1938, Plagge became the godfather of Hesse's son Konrad. The same year, Plagge took over as chief engineer of the Hessenwerks.

== Service in Lithuania ==
=== HKP 562 ===
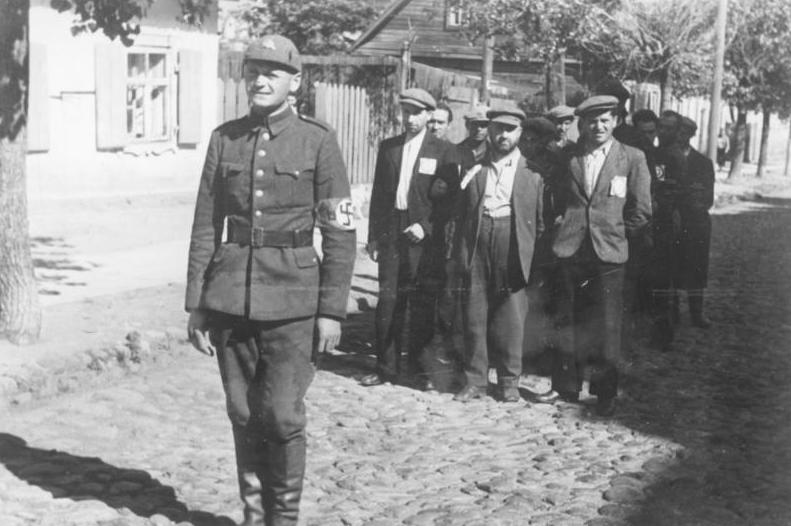
Lithuanian collaborator with Jewish prisoners, July 1941

Plagge was drafted into the Wehrmacht (German Army) as a captain in the reserve at the beginning of World War II, and stopped paying Nazi Party membership fees at the same time. Serving initially in Poland after the German invasion, he witnessed atrocities that caused him to decide "to work against the Nazis". In 1941, he was put in command of an engineering unit, Heereskraftfahrpark 562 (vehicle maintenance unit 562, or HKP 562; literally, "Army motor-vehicle park"), which maintained and repaired military vehicles. After the German invasion of the Soviet Union, HKP 562 was deployed to Vilna, Lithuania, in early July 1941. Plagge witnessed the genocide being carried out against the Jews of the area.

Plagge gave work certificates to Jewish men, certifying them as essential and skilled workers regardless of their actual backgrounds. This kind of work permit protected the worker, his wife, and up to two of his children from the SS sweeps carried out in the Vilna Ghetto, in which Jews without work papers were captured and killed at the nearby Ponary execution grounds. As a work assignment, HKP 562 was particularly sought after by Jews because of Plagge's efforts to treat his workers well. Plagge also made efforts to help Poles and Soviet prisoners of war forced to work for the Wehrmacht. Plagge was the "quasi-sovereign" of his unit, retaining his independence so long as the repair work got done, and worked to insulate his workers from the genocide perpetrated by the SS. He reassigned antisemitic or violent subordinates so that they did not interact with Jewish workers and turned a blind eye to the smuggling and black market that kept the workers alive. During the autumn of 1941, when many Jews were rounded up and shot in "Aktions", Plagge's workshop was the fourth-largest employer of Jews in Vilnius, with 261 work permits allocated.

When his workers were captured during sweeps, Plagge attempted to free them from Lukiškės Prison before they could be executed at Ponary. If only a few Jews were arrested, he sent a subordinate. However, in late 1941, 70 Jewish workers and their families were arrested. Plagge exaggerated their importance to the war effort and managed to secure the release of all of them. In 1942, 200 Jews working for Plagge were rounded up for deportation. Plagge argued with SS-Obersturmführer Rolf Neugebauer in an attempt to secure their release, but was unable to save them. In 1943, after negotiations with the SS, Plagge was able to expand his workforce from 394 Jews in July to more than 1,000 when the ghetto was liquidated in September.

=== Labour camp ===
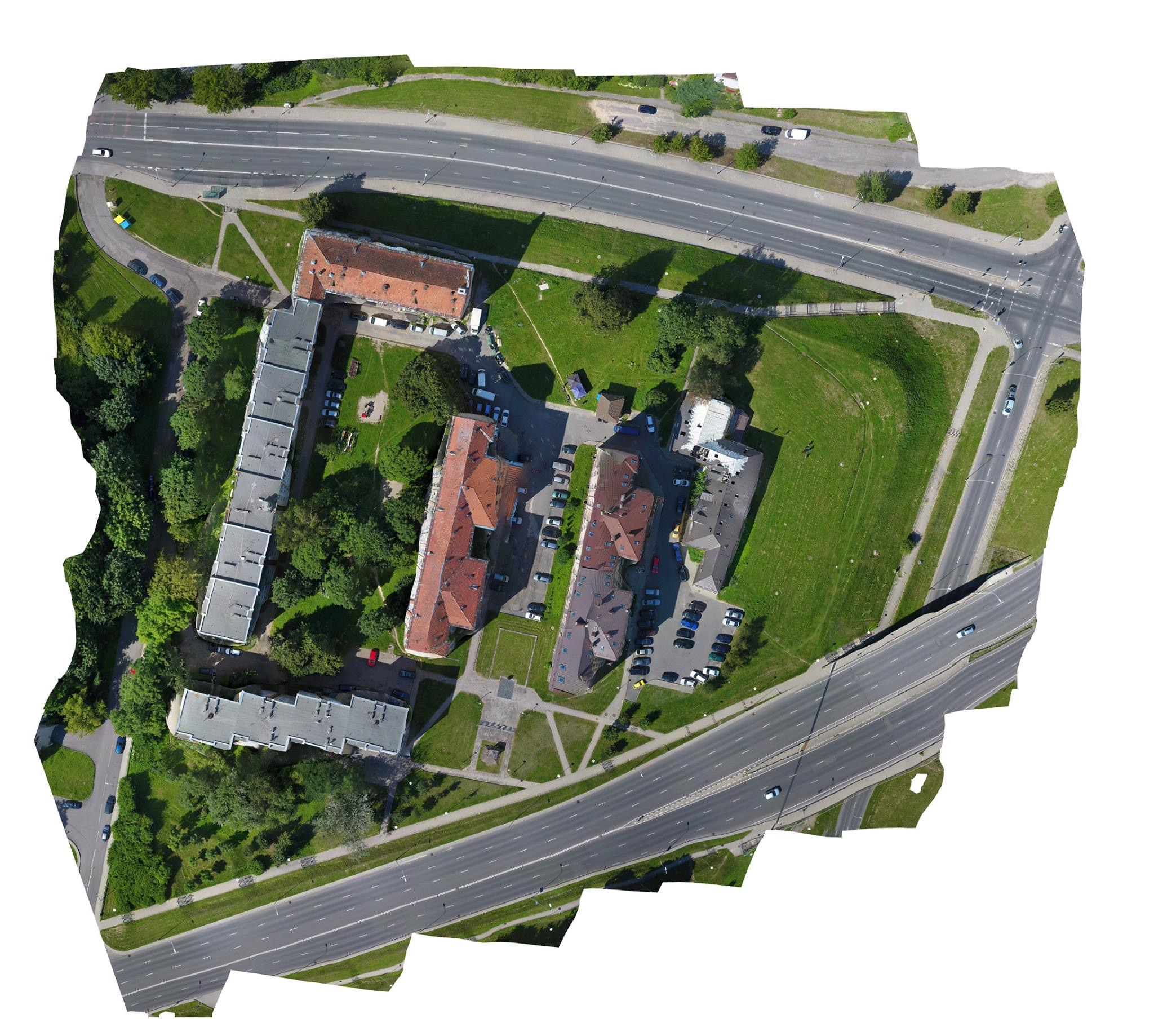
Aerial photograph of the former HKP 562 camp

In the aftermath of the April 1943 Warsaw Ghetto Uprising and an increase in Soviet partisan activity, Heinrich Himmler, the head of the SS, decided to liquidate all Nazi ghettos, regardless of the slave labor they provided to the Wehrmacht's war effort. In particular, the Vilna Ghetto was seen as a threat because of its extensive underground movement and the proximity of partisans in the woods around the city. Plagge, who had been promoted to major, secured permission from the SS to establish a Juden-KZ for HKP 562 on Subocz Street on the outskirts of Vilnius. HKP 562 was the only Wehrmacht unit allowed to retain Jewish workers. On 1 September, about 300 of Plagge's workers were seized by the SS for transportation to the Klooga concentration camp. Plagge went to the train station to argue with an SS non-commissioned officer, Bruno Kittel, who was in charge of the liquidation. Initially able to secure their release, Plagge left the Jews with subordinates, but Kittel's superior officer, SS-Obersturmführer Rolf Neugebauer, ordered them to be deported anyway. Plagge attempted to contact Neugebauer, but was unable to, and the Jews were all deported to Klooga. He then ordered his subordinates to recruit other Jewish workers to replace those who had been deported.

On 16 September 1943, Plagge transported over 1,000 of his Jewish workers and their families from the Vilna Ghetto to the newly built HKP camp at 37 Subocz Street, where they remained in relative safety. Plagge saved not only skilled male workers but also their wives and children, arguing that the workers would not be motivated without their families. Less than a week later, on 23 September, the SS liquidated the Vilna Ghetto. The rest of Vilna's Jews were either executed immediately at Ponary or sent to concentration camps in Nazi-occupied Europe. A few Jews hid in the ruins of the ghetto; arguing that he needed more workers, Plagge brought 100 arrested Jews into HKP. Another 100 Jews were smuggled in by the resistance movement with Plagge's acquiescence, and the population peaked at 1,250 early in 1944. The camp, which consisted of two multistory tenements originally constructed to house Jews on welfare, was surrounded by barbed wire and guarded by Lithuanian collaborators and SS men. About 60% of the Jews worked at the vehicle repair depot or a shop for repairing Wehrmacht uniforms. Plagge established various industries for the rest of his workers, including a rabbit farm, a nursery, and a carpenter's shop, declaring all of his workers essential to the war effort. He strongly resisted the SS's efforts to remove these nonessential workers.

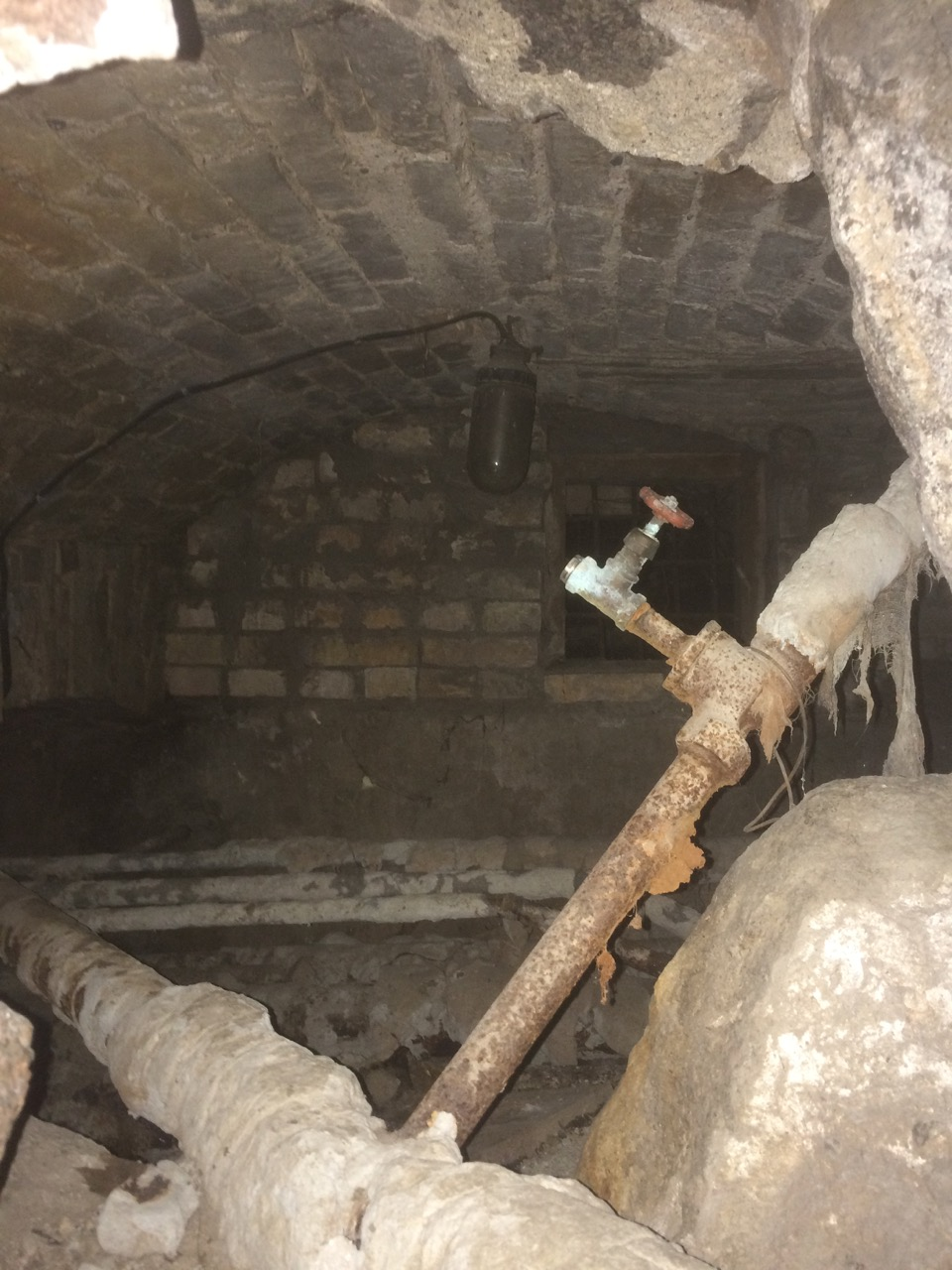
A maline (Yiddish slang for 'hiding place') where Jews hid during the liquidation of the camp

On certain occasions, Plagge's policy of non-confrontation with the SS put him "in a catch-22 situation with serious moral implications", according to historian Kim Priemel. On multiple occasions, HKP 562 loaned trucks and drivers to the SS to transport Jews to Ponary for execution. In November 1943, a Jewish prisoner named David Zalkind, his wife and child attempted to escape from the camp and were caught by the Gestapo. They were executed in the camp courtyard in front of the other prisoners; the SS officer who ordered the killing reported that it was done "in accord with the Park-leader Major Plagge". Following Zalkind's execution, 36 Jewish women were executed by Bruno Kittel and SS soldiers. On 27 March 1944, while Plagge was away on home leave in Germany, the SS carried out a Kinderaktion ("Children Operation"): they entered the camp, rounded up about 250 children and elderly Jews, and took them to Ponary for execution. Although Plagge claimed upon his return that he would have saved the children if he had been present, it is doubtful that he could have done so. Plagge's acquiescence to these killings made him "[in] moral terms... as much a collaborator" as a rescuer, according to Priemel. However, Plagge's collaboration was "arguably a rational choice", because he was able to save more Jews than any other Wehrmacht rescuer in Vilnius.

=== Dissolution ===
During the summer of 1944, the Red Army advanced to the outskirts of Vilnius and the Wehrmacht withdrew abruptly in early July. The camp was to be dissolved; accused of being soft on Jews, Plagge was forbidden to take them with his unit. Knowing that the camp would be liquidated before the Red Army arrived, the Jews made hiding places in the camp in secret bunkers, in walls, and in the rafters of the attic. However, they needed to know when the camp would be liquidated so they could implement their plans to escape or hide. On 1 July, Plagge made an informal speech to the Jewish prisoners in the presence of SS Oberscharführer Richter:

The front line is moving west and HKP's assignment is to always be a certain number of miles behind the front line... As a result, you the Jews, and the workers will also be moved... since all of you are highly specialized and experienced workers in an area of great importance to the German Army, you will be reassigned to an HKP unit... You will be escorted during this evacuation by the SS which, as you know, is an organization devoted to the protection of refugees. Thus, there's nothing to worry about...

— Karl Plagge's speech according to survivor William Begell

In response to a question from the assembled Jews, Plagge added that there was no need to bring their luggage. When the SS came to the camp on 4 July, 500 Jews appeared at the roll call and were executed at Ponary. The rest either tried to escape or hid inside the camp. About 150 or 200 Jews survived the searches and were liberated by the Red Army on 13 July. Of the 100,000 Jews in Vilnius, only 2,000 survived the Holocaust; survivors of the HKP camp constituted the largest single group.

== Post-war ==
Perhaps others lacked only a little determination to act in the same way in order to prevent or reduce the horror. I have never felt that this work took special courage. It only required a convincing strength that anyone can draw from the depths of a moral conscience everyone has. Moreover, it takes perhaps a bit of goodwill, occasionally a good idea, and dedication to the task at hand. I never had the feeling that I was in great danger... Basically, I am not a "hero" but a rather timid person.

— Karl Plagge

After leaving Vilnius, Plagge led his unit westward and surrendered to the United States Army on 2 May 1945 without suffering a single casualty.

Because he had joined the Nazi Party so early and commanded a labor camp where many prisoners were murdered, he was tried in 1947 as part of the postwar denazification process; he hired a lawyer to defend him. Plagge and his former subordinates told the court about his efforts to help Jewish forced laborers; Plagge's lawyer asked for him to be classified as a fellow traveler rather than an active Nazi. Former prisoners of HKP 562 in a displaced person camp in Ludwigsburg told Maria Eichamueller about Plagge's actions. After reading about the trial in a local newspaper, Eichamueller testified on Plagge's behalf, which influenced the trial result in his favor. The court did not exonerate Plagge completely, because it believed that his actions had been motivated by humanitarianism rather than opposition to Nazism.

The judges may have been reluctant to recognize the extent of Plagge's humanitarian achievements because they cast a bad light on the indifference of ordinary Germans to the Holocaust and the retention of Nazi judges in the postwar judicial system.

After the trial, Plagge lived the final decade of his life quietly and died of a heart attack in Darmstadt on 19 June 1957. In a letter to a Jewish lawyer, R. Strauss, dated 26 April 1956, Plagge compared himself to Dr. Rieux, a character in Albert Camus's novel The Plague. In the novel, which was written while Camus was living under Nazi occupation in France, Rieux risks his life to save people from the plague, but his efforts cannot save very many people and often appear useless. Like Plagge, Rieux does not see himself as a hero.

Originally a Lutheran, Plagge lost his belief in God because of the atrocities that he witnessed during the Holocaust.

== Assessment and legacy ==
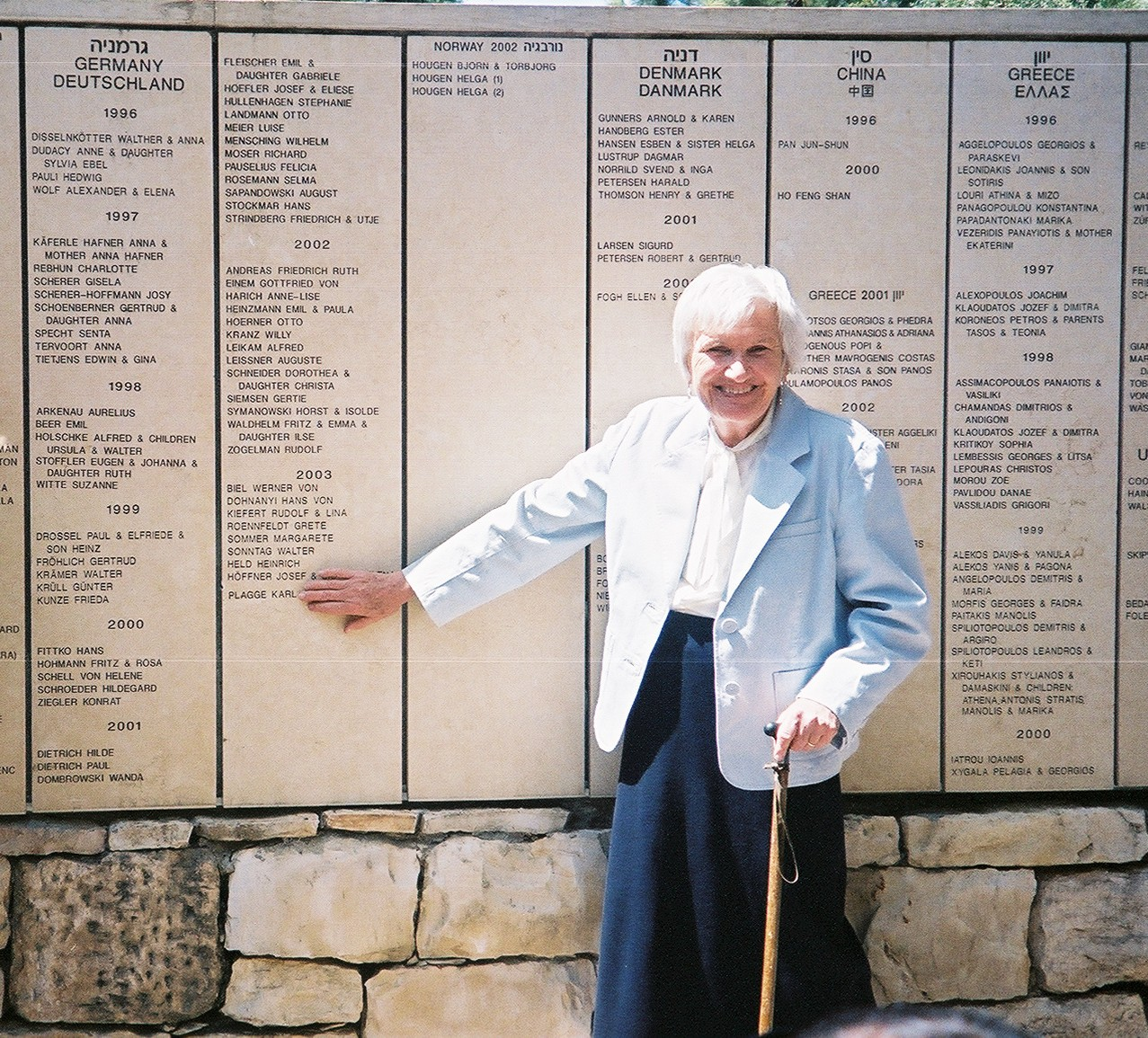
HKP survivor Pearl Good points to Plagge's name on the Wall of the Righteous at Yad Vashem

In 1999, HKP 562 survivor Pearl Good traveled to Vilnius with her family. Good's son, Michael, decided to investigate the story of Plagge, but he had trouble locating him because survivors knew him only as "Major Plagge" and did not know his full name or place of birth. After fourteen months, Good was able to find Plagge's Wehrmacht personnel file. He eventually published the results of his research in 2005 as The Search for Major Plagge: The Nazi Who Saved Jews. Good formed an organization of researchers and friends that he called the "Plagge Group" and, along with HKP survivors, petitioned Yad Vashem, Israel's official memorial to the Holocaust, to have Plagge recognized as "Righteous Among the Nations".

Their first petition, in 2002, was rejected. They applied again the next year and received a reply stating that "we fail to understand what possible risks he had to fear from his superiors". In Yad Vashem's view, Plagge's efforts to save Jewish workers and treat them humanely were probably related to serving the German war effort. The Plagge Group disagreed, pointing out that Wehrmacht soldiers associating with Jews were threatened with being treated as Jews; indeed, Wehrmacht Sergeant Anton Schmid had been executed in 1942 for helping Jews in the Vilna Ghetto. In 2004, the letter that Plagge had written in 1956 to Strauss was discovered. Letters between Plagge and SS-Obersturmbannführer Wilhelm Göcke, which persuaded the latter to spare the female forced laborers in the HKP 562 camp, were uncovered that same year.

The Yad Vashem committee voted on 22 July 2004 to recognize Plagge as Righteous Among the Nations. The ceremony, held in Jerusalem on 11 April 2005, was attended by many survivors, Konrad Hesse, and a few members of Plagge's extended family. Mordecai Paldiel, the director of the committee, thanked Pearl Good for making the trip to Vilnius with her family and sparking the chain of events that uncovered Plagge's actions during the war. Because Plagge had no descendants, the president of the Technische Universität Darmstadt accepted the award on his behalf. In February 2006, the former Frankensteinkaserne, a Bundeswehr base in Pfungstadt, Germany, was renamed the Karl-Plagge-Kaserne. A bust of Plagge was placed in the schoolyard of the Ludwig-Georgs-Gymnasium in Darmstadt. Following archaeological work done at the HKP 562 site in 2017, a documentary about Plagge and the camp, The Good Nazi, premiered in Vilnius the following year.

Plagge's actions were very unusual: very few Wehrmacht soldiers helped Jews during the Holocaust. However, the soldiers under his command and other Wehrmacht officials, including Hans Christian Hingst, the civilian administrator of German-occupied Vilnius, were aware of Plagge's rescue activities and did not denounce him. The historian Kim Priemel, examining Wehrmacht rescuers in Vilnius, concludes that Plagge "remained within a 'grey zone' of moral compromise, which, however, was vital to the success of [his] rescue efforts".
