= Medal of the Order for Merits to Lithuania =

Medal of the Order for Merits to Lithuania Ordino „Už nuopelnus Lietuvai“ medalis
- Type: Medal of order
- Awarded for: Merits to Lithuania
- Presented by: Lithuania
- Established: 2002
- Ribbon
- Related: Order for Merits to Lithuania

The Medal of the Order For Merits to Lithuania (Lithuanian: Ordino „Už nuopelnus Lietuvai“ medalis) is a state award of Lithuania, established in 2002. The 2020 revision of the law states that it is awarded by a decree of the President of Lithuania to persons for their merits in promoting the name of Lithuania in the fields of culture, science, education, business, production, health, social security, military, sports, economy and other fields, as well as for humanitarian aid to Lithuania, for merits for maternity, paternity, guardianship or care. For example, it is awarded to mothers who have given birth to and raised well seven or more children.

The medal is silver, 36 mm in diameter. On the obverse the Order for Merits to Lithuania is engraved. On the reverse a wreath, the inscription "Pro Lituania" and the year when the medal was instituted (2002) are engraved. The medal uses the ribbon the Order.

== See also ==
- Order for Merits to Lithuania
