= Vilna Gaon Museum of Jewish History =

Museum in Vilnius, Lithuania

- Vilniaus Gaono žydų istorijos muziejus

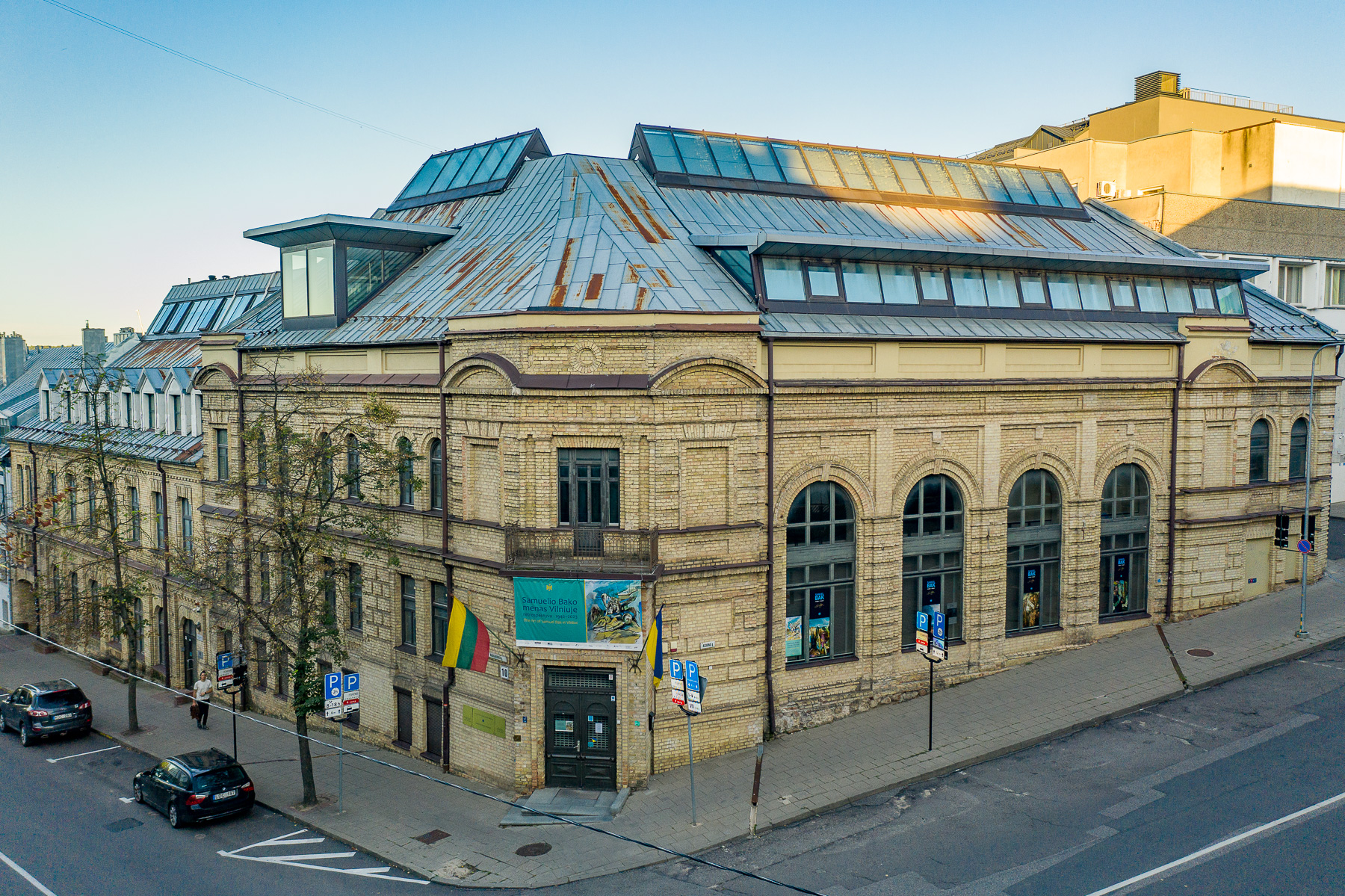
- Vilna Gaon Museum of Jewish History
- Established: 1989
- Location: Lithuania
- Coordinates: 54°40′37″N 25°16′36″E
- Website: www.jmuseum.lt/en/

Vilna Gaon Museum of Jewish History (Lithuanian: Vilniaus Gaono žydų istorijos muziejus; Yiddish: דער ווילנער גאון מלוכהשער יידישער מוז, romanized: Der Vilner Gaun Mlukhhsher Eydisher Muz) is a Lithuanian museum dedicated to the historical and cultural heritage of Lithuanian Jewry.

== History ==
The Vilna Gaon museum was established in 1989 by the Lithuanian Ministry of Culture. Over the years, its collection has been expanded to include objects from other museums in Lithuania. The museum was renamed in 1997 to commemorate the 200th anniversary of the death of the Talmudic scholar Vilna Gaon.

The museum has five branches that focus on different aspects of Jewish history and culture:

- The Tolerance Center's collections include works of sacred, modern, and traditional art along with historical materials
- The Green House is a Holocaust exhibit
- The Paneriai Memorial is dedicated to the Paneriai (Ponary) Massacre
- The Jacques Lipchitz Memorial Museum in Druskininkai exhibits his lithographs
- The former Tarbut Gymnasium displays the history of Lithuanian Jews in the interwar and Nazi period.

The museum acquires and systematizes materials, issues publications, conducts research, organizes permanent and temporary exhibitions, and sponsors educational activities.

In 2010, the Museum and the Austrian Verein Gedenkdienst joined forces to launch the Lithuanian Holocaust Atlas project. Expanding on previous research on Holocaust murder sites in Lithuania, the project created an internet database, and in 2011 published the Lithuanian Holocaust Atlas, a 318-page volume reference book of 227 mass graves with detailed information on the location, coordinates, perpetrators, victims and their number. Dr. Arūnas Bubnys served as the project's historian.

== See also ==
- History of the Jews in Lithuania
