= List of Heroes of the Soviet Union (T) =

The title Hero of the Soviet Union was the highest distinction of the Soviet Union. It was awarded 12,775 times. Due to the large size of the list, it has been broken up into multiple pages.

- David Tavadze ru
- Afanasy Tavakov ru
- Pyotr Tavrovsky ru
- Vladimir Tagiltsev ru
- Aleksey Tazaev ru
- Tokybai Taygaraev ru
- Vasily Talalaev ru
- Viktor Talalikhin
- Nikolai Talalushkin ru
- Konstantin Talakh ru
- Arnaldo Tamayo Méndez
- Vladimir Tambiev ru
- Pyotr Tananaev ru
- Aleksandr Tanaseychuk ru
- Vasily Tanachev ru
- Pyotr Tankov ru
- Ivan Tankopy ru
- Nikolai Tansky ru
- Grigory Tantsorov ru
- Vasily Tantsurenko ru
- Ivan Tantsyura ru
- Samuil Tapikov ru
- Yuri Taptunov ru
- Aleksandr Tarakanov ru
- Aleksey Tarakanov ru
- Nikolai Nikolaevich Tarakanov ru
- Nikolai Sergeevich Tarakanov ru
- Nikolai Tarakanchikov ru
- Grigory Taran ru
- Pavel Taran (twice)
- Pyotr Taran ru
- Ivan Taranenko
- Ivan Taranov ru
- Vasily Taranovsky ru
- Pyotr Tarantsev ru
- Ismailbek Taranchiev
- Vladimir Tarasevich ru
- Konstantin Tarasevich ru
- Aleksandr Tarasenko ru
- Vasily Fyodorovich Tarasenko ru
- Vasily Fomich Tarasenko ru
- Ivan Tarasenko ru
- Pavel Tarasenko ru
- Pavel Taraskin ru
- Dmitry Taraskov ru
- Aleksey Tarasov ru
- Georgy Tarasov ru
- Grigory Tarasov ru
- Dmitry Vasilylevich Tarasov ru
- Dmitry Zakharovich Tarasov ru
- Yevgeny Tarasov ru
- Konstantin Tarasov ru
- Luka Tarasov ru
- Nikolai Arsentevich Tarasov ru
- Nikolai Grigorievich Tarasov ru
- Pavel Tarasov
- Pyotr Maksimovich Tarasov ru
- Pyotr Mikhailovich Tarasov ru
- Fyodor Yefremovich Tarasov ru
- Fyodor Illarionovich Tarasov ru
- Vasily Tarlovsky ru
- Abram Tarnopolsky ru
- Iosif Tarsukov ru
- Semyon Tartykov ru
- Sergey Tarkhov ru
- Grigory Taryanik ru
- Kenilbay Taskulov ru
- Boris Tasuy ru
- Dmitry Tatarenko ru
- Ivan Tatarinov ru
- Leonid Tatarinov ru
- Pyotr Tatarkin ru
- Aleksey Tatarnikov ru
- Pyotr Tatarchenkov ru
- Aidogy Takhirov ru
- Ilya Takhtarov ru
- Mikhail Tashkin ru
- Yuri Tvarkovsky ru
- Georgy Tvauri ru
- Mikhail Tvelenev ru
- Arsenty Tverdokhlebov ru
- Ilya Tverdokhlebov ru
- Dmitry Tveritinov ru
- Pavel Tebekin ru
- Anatoly Tebenkov ru
- Vladimir Tegentsov ru
- Pavel Tezikov ru
- Anatoly Televinov ru
- Grigory Telegin ru
- Yakov Telechenko ru
- Andrey Teleshev ru
- Yevgeny Teleshev ru
- Mikhail Teleshevsky ru
- Nikolai Telyakov ru
- Leonid Telyatnikov
- Seytkhan Temirbaev ru
- Abram Tamnik ru
- Viktor Temnov ru
- Ivan Temchenko ru
- Vasily Temchuk ru
- Ivan Tenishchev ru
- Mikhail Teodorovich ru
- Mikhail Petrovich Teplov ru
- Mikhail Fedotovich Teplov ru
- Sergey Teplov ru
- Mikhail Teploukhov ru
- Dmitry Teplyakov ru
- Martyn Teplyakov ru
- Arsen Ter-Oganov ru
- Yevgeny Terezov ru
- Akaky Tereladze ru
- Nikolai Terenkov ru
- Boris Terentev ru
- Grigory Terentev ru
- Ivan Teryokhin ru
- Makar Teryokhin
- Nikolai Teryokhin ru
- Filipp Terekhov ru
- Sergey Tereshkevich ru
- Pyotr Teryoshkin ru
- Aleksey Tereshkov ru
- Valentina Tereshkova
- Vasily Tereshchenko ru
- Mikhail Tereshchenko ru
- Nikolai Tereshchenko ru
- Spiridon Tereshchenko ru
- Ivan Tereshchuk ru
- Vladimir Terletsky ru
- Ivan Ternavsky ru
- Boris Ternovoy ru
- Vladimir Ternovoy ru
- Pyotr Ternovoy ru
- Georgy Ternovsky ru
- Pyotr Tertyshny ru
- Pyotr Teryaev ru
- Nikolai Tesakov ru
- Richard Tesařík
- Ilya Teslenko ru
- Pavel Teslenko ru
- Nikolai Testov ru
- Mamasaly Teshebaev ru
- Shota Tibua ru
- Pyotr Tikilyaynen ru
- Grigory Tikunov ru
- Aleksandr Timakov ru
- Vasily Timonov ru
- Fyodor Timonov ru
- Aleksey Timofeyev ru
- Andrey Timofeyev ru
- Vasily Timofeyev ru
- Dmitry Timofeevich Timofeyev ru
- Dmitry Fomich Timofeyev ru
- Konstantin Timofeyev ru
- Nikolai Aleksandrovich Timofeyev ru
- Nikolai Pavlovich Timofeyev ru
- Ryurik Timofeyev ru
- Severyan Timofeyev ru
- Sergey Timofeyev ru
- Ivan Timofeenko ru
- Gury Timokhin ru
- Anatoly Timoshenko ru
- Afanasy Timoshenko ru
- Vladimir Ivanovich Timoshenko ru
- Vladimir Yakovlevich Timoshenko ru
- Ivan Timoshenko ru
- Mikhail Timoshenko ru
- Semyon Timoshenko (twice)
- Fyodor Timoshenko ru
- Aleksandr Timoshchenko ru
- Vasily Timoshchuk ru
- Vladimir Timoshchuk ru
- Dmitry Timoshchuk ru
- Georgy Timushev ru
- Vasily Timchenko ru
- Pyotr Timchenko ru
- Ivan Timchuk ru
- Pavel Timshin ru
- Nikolai Tinkov ru
- Aleksandr Tipanov ru
- Stepan Titarenko ru
- Andrey Titanko
- Konstantin Titenkov ru
- Ivan Titkov ru
- Ivan Titlin ru
- Mikhail Titlov ru
- Aleksey Timofeevich Titov ru
- Aleksey Fyodorovich Titov ru
- Andrey Titov ru
- Valentin Titov ru
- Vasily Titov ru
- Vladimir Titov
- German Titov
- Ivan Antonovich Titov ru
- Nikolai Mikhailovich Titov ru
- Nikolai Petrovich Titov ru
- Fyodor Titov ru
- Fyodor Titov ru
- Vladimir Titovich ru
- Sergey Titovka ru
- Leonid Tikhmyanov ru
- Anatoly Tikhov ru
- Aleksandr Tikhomirov ru
- Vladimir Tikhomirov ru
- Ivan Vasilyevich Tikhomirov ru
- Ivan Nikolaevich Tikhomirov ru
- Ilya Tikhomirov ru
- Stepan Tikhomirov ru
- Boris Tikhomolov ru
- Andrey Tikhonenko ru
- Ivan Tikhonenko ru
- Aleksey Tikhonov ru
- Boris Tikhonov ru
- Vasily Gavrilovich Tikhonov ru
- Vasily Ivanovich Tikhonov (soldier) ru
- Vasily Ivanovich Tikhonov (politruk) ru
- Viktor Ivanovich Tikhonov ru
- Viktor Pavlovich Tikhonov ru
- Grigory Tikhonov ru
- Konstantin Tikhonov ru
- Mikhail Ivanovich Tikhonov ru
- Mikhail Fyodorovich Tikhonov
- Nikolai ViktorovichTkachyov Tikhonov ru
- Nikolai Ivanovich Tikhonov ru
- Pavel Tikhonov ru
- Viktor Tishko ru
- Aleksandr Tishenko ru
- Matevy Tishchenko ru
- Mikhail Tishchenko ru
- Konstantin Tkabladze ru
- Aleksandr Tkanko ru
- Vladimir Tkachyov ru
- Grigory Tkachyov ru
- Makar Tkachyov ru
- Nikolai Tkachyov ru
- Fyodor Tkachyov ru
- Yuri Tkachevsky ru
- Aleksandr Kuzmich Tkachenko ru
- Aleksandr Prokhorovich Tkachenko ru
- Andrey Grigorievich Tkachenko ru
- Andrey Yakovlevich Tkachenko ru
- Vasily Tkachenko ru
- Vladimir Tkachenko ru
- Grigory Tikhonovich Tkachenko ru
- Grigory Trofimovich Tkachenko ru
- Ivan Vasilyevich Tkachenko ru
- Ivan Fillipovich Tkachenko ru
- Ilya Ivanovich Tkachenko (1914—1979) ru
- Ilya Ivanovich Tkachenko (1924—1943) ru
- Mikhail Tkachenko ru
- Nikanor Tkachenko ru
- Pyotr Tkachenko ru
- Platon Tkachenko ru
- Yakov Tkachenko ru
- Ivan Tkachuk ru
- Mikhail Tobolenko ru
- Aleksandr Tovpenko ru
- Vasily Tovstukho ru
- Kaurbek Toguzov ru
- Vasily Tokarev ru
- Yegor Tokarev ru
- Moisey Tokarev ru
- Nikolai Tokarev ru
- Sergey Tokarev ru
- Stepan Tokarev ru
- Mikhail Tokarenko ru
- Nikita Tokarlikov ru
- Rakhimzhan Tokataev ru
- Yevgeny Tokmakov ru
- Yakov Tokmakov ru
- Ivan Tokmin ru
- Grigory Tokuev ru
- Fyodor Tolbukhin
- Vasily Tolkachyov ru
- Grigory Tolkachyov ru
- Mikhail Tolkachyov ru
- Aleksandr Tolmachyov ru
- Aleksey Tolmachyov ru
- Grigory Tolmachyov ru
- Mikhail Tolmachyov ru
- Nikolai Tolmachyov ru
- Boris Toloknov ru
- Vasily Tolstikov ru
- Yevgeny Tolstikov
- Pavel Tolstikov ru
- Valentin Tolstov ru
- Vasily Tolstov ru
- Pyotr Tolstov ru
- Ivan Tolstoy ru
- Stepan Tolstoy ru
- Nikolai Tolstukhin ru
- Vasily Tolstykh ru
- Vasily Tomarov ru
- Pyotr Tomasevich ru
- Nikolai Tomashevich ru
- Ivan Tomashevsky ru
- Kazimir Tomashevsky ru
- Valentin Tomzhevsky ru
- Leonid Tomilin ru
- Pavel Tomilin ru
- Arsenty Tomilov ru
- Goergy Tomilovsky ru
- Vitaly Tomilovskikh ru
- Yegor Tomko ru
- Aleksey Tomsky ru
- Ivan Tonkonog ru
- Anatoly Topaller ru
- Mamadali Topivoldiyev ru
- Nikolai Topolnikov ru
- Arsenty Topolsky ru
- Vitalu Topolsky ru
- Ivan Toporikov ru
- Andrey Toporkov ru
- Ivan Toporkov ru
- Yakov Toporkov ru
- Filipp Torgovtsev ru
- Pyotr Torhunakov ru
- Ivan Torshinsky ru
- Ivan Tornev ru
- Aleksey Toropkin ru
- Aleksandr Toropov ru
- Artemy Topopov ru
- Nikolai Toropchin ru
- Aleksandr Tortsev ru
- Nikolai Torchigin ru
- Nikolai Totmin ru
- Dmitry Totmyanin ru
- Tulegen Tokhtarov ru
- Vikenty Toshchenko ru
- Ivan Vasilyevich Travkin
- Ivan Mikhailovich Travkin ru
- Pyotr Traynin ru
- Yegor Trakhtaev ru
- Nikolai Tregubov ru
- Dmitry Tremasov ru
- Konstantin Trembach ru
- Ivan Lukich Tretyak ru
- Ivan Moiseevich Tretyak ru
- Nikolai Tretyakov ru
- Konstantin Treshchyov ru
- Aleksey Tribunsky ru
- Aleksandr Tripolsky ru
- Aleksandr Trifonov ru
- Boris Trifonov ru
- Ivan Trifonov ru
- Feoktist Trifonov ru
- Gennady Troitsky ru
- Nikolai Trostinsky ru
- Sergey Trofimenko
- Andrey Trofimov ru
- Vladimir Trofimov ru
- Dmitry Trofimov ru
- Yevgeny Trofimov ru
- Ivan Andreevich Trofimov ru
- Ivan Maksimovich Trofimov ru
- Nikolai Trofimov ru
- Nikolai Trofimov ru
- Fyodor Trofimov
- Aleksey Troshin ru
- Aleksandr Troshkov ru
- Nadezhda Troyan
- Vasily Trubachyov ru
- Vasily Trubachenko ru
- Ivan Trubin ru
- Mikhail Trubitsyn ru
- Nikolai Trubitsyn ru
- Valery Trubov ru
- Andrey Trud ru
- Vasily Trudolyubov ru
- Vladimir Truzhnikov ru
- Pavel Trunkin ru
- Pavel Trunov ru
- Viktor Trusov ru
- Yevgeny Trusov ru
- Ivan Trusov ru
- Mikhail Trusov ru
- Pyotr Trufanov ru
- Pyotr Trukhanov ru
- Ivan Trukhin ru
- Konstantin Trukhinov ru
- Andrey Trukhov ru
- Lavrenty Truchak ru
- Ivan Trushev ru
- Vasily Trushechkin ru
- Vasily Andreevich Trushin ru
- Vasily Trushin ru
- Vasily Trushkin ru
- Ilya Trushkov ru
- Nikolai Trushkov ru
- Sergey Trushkovsky ru
- Pyotr Trushnikov ru
- Aleksandr Trynin ru
- Yerminingeld Tryasin ru
- Aleksandr Tryaskin ru
- Andrey Tryaskin ru
- Andrey Tsaplin ru
- Pavel Tsaplin ru
- Ivan Tsapov ru
- Aleksandr Tsaryov ru
- Aleksey Tsaryov ru
- Aleksey Tsaregorodsky ru
- Lavrenty Tsarenko ru
- Boris Tsarikov ru
- Konstantin Tsaritsyn ru
- Vladimir Tsaryuk ru
- Vyacheslav Tsvetaev
- Vasily Tsvetkov ru
- Stepan Tsvik ru
- Pyotr Tsvily ru
- Mikhail Tselak ru
- Kirill Tselik ru
- Georgy Tselio ru
- Nikolai Tselkovsky ru
- Sergey Tselykh ru
- Grigory Tsibenko ru
- Ivan Tsibizov ru
- Leonid Tsibizov ru
- Vasily Tsibulko ru
- Viktor Tsivchinsky ru
- Platon Tsikoridze ru
- Boris Tsindelis ru
- Dmitry Tsirubin ru
- Mikhail Tsiselsky
- Yefim Tsitovsky ru
- Irakly Tsitsishvili ru
- Gennady Tsokolaev ru
- Mariya Tsukanova
- Boris Tzulukidze ru
- Stepan Tsuprenkov ru
- Aleksandr Tsurtsumiya ru
- Konstantin Tsutskiridze ru
- Ivan Tskhovrebov ru
- Pyotr Tsyban ru
- Ivan Tsybenko ru
- Ivan Tsybin ru
- Alekseu Tsybulyov ru
- Nikolai Tsybulsky ru
- Vasily Tsygankov ru
- Pyotr Tsygankov ru
- Yevgeny Tsyganov ru
- Mikhail Tsyganov ru
- Nikolai Tsyganov ru
- Pyotr Tsyganov ru
- Mikhail Tsykin ru
- Pavel Tsylyov ru
- Andrey Tsymbal ru
- Vasily Tsymbal ru
- Ivan Tsymbal ru
- Vasily Tsymbalenko ru
- Ivan Tsymbalist ru
- Andrey Tsymbalyuk ru
- Yevgeny Tsyplenkov ru
- Nikolai Tsyplukhin ru
- Vasily Tsys ru
- Aleksandr Tsytsarkin ru
- Kydran Tugambaev ru
- Yelisy Tugushin ru
- Sergey Tuzhlikov ru
- Vasily Tuzov ru
- Mikhail Tuzov ru
- Nikolai Tuzov ru
- Leonid Tuygunov ru
- Urmash Tuktubaev ru
- Zhambyl Tulaev
- Cholpolbai Tuleberdiev ru
- Dmitry Tulinov ru
- Aleksandr Tulintsev ru
- Konstantin Tulupov ru
- Andrey Tulnikov ru
- Mikhail Tumakshin ru
- Ivan Tumanov ru
- Viktor Tumar ru
- Grigory Tupikin ru
- Andrey Tupitsin ru
- Grigory Tupitsyn ru
- Ivan Tupitsyn ru
- Dzhurakul Turaev ru
- Mikhail Turbai ru
- Viktor Turbin
- Dmitry Turbin ru
- Pyotr Turbin ru
- Mikhail Turgel ru
- Fyodor Turgenev ru
- Saidkul Turdyev ru
- Yevgeny Turenko ru
- Boris Turzhansky
- Aleksey Turikov ru
- Ivan Turkenich
- Denis Turkov ru
- Nikolai Turkov ru
- Vladislav Turkuli ru
- Fyodor Turov ru
- Nikita Turovets ru
- Vasily Turovtsev ru
- Gennady Turunov ru
- Goergy Turukhanov ru
- Nikolai Turtsevich ru
- Nikolai Turchenko ru
- Pavel Turchenko ru
- Vasily Turchin ru
- Nikolai Turchin ru
- Adam Turchinsky ru
- Valeryan Turygin ru
- Pinkhus Turyan
- Zinaida Tusnolobova-Marchenko
- Pyotr Tutukov ru
- Semyon Tutuchenko ru
- Ivan Tuftov ru
- Aleksandr Tukhlanov ru
- Georgy Tuchin ru
- Ivan Tushev ru
- Kuzma Tushnolobov ru
- Ismail Tkhagushev ru
- Grigory Tkhor
- Aleksandr Tkhorzhevsky ru
- Daniil Tykvach ru
- Georgy Tyrin ru
- Vladimir Tyrsa ru
- Nikolai Tyrykin ru
- Vladimir Tytar ru
- Vladimir Tyshevich ru
- Kozhakhmet Tyshkanbaev ru
- Vasily Tyshkevich ru
- Ivan Tyshkun ru
- Yevgeny Tyshchik ru
- Vladimir Tyukov ru
- Ivan Vladimirovich Tyulenev
- Ivan Nikolaevich Tyulenev ru
- Fyodor Tyulenev ru
- Sergey Tyulenin ru
- Aleksandr Tyulin ru
- Aleksey Tyulga ru
- Mikhail Tyulkin ru
- Yakov Tyulkin ru
- Fyodor Tyumentsev ru
- Fyodor Tyunin ru
- Sergey Tyurikov ru
- Aleksandr Tyurin ru
- Aleksandr Tyurin ru
- Vasily Tyurin ru
- Ivan Tyurin ru
- Konstantin Tyurin ru
- Leonid Tyurin ru
- Mikhail Tyurin ru
- Dmitry Tyurkin ru
- Pyotr Tyunev ru
- Aleksandr Tyuryumin ru
- Nikolai Tyusin ru
- Nikolai Tyavkin ru
- Yefim Tyagushev ru
- Aleksey Tyapushkin ru
- Gavriil Tyashchenko ru
