= Belarusian-Polish conflict in the Generalbezirk Weißruthenien =

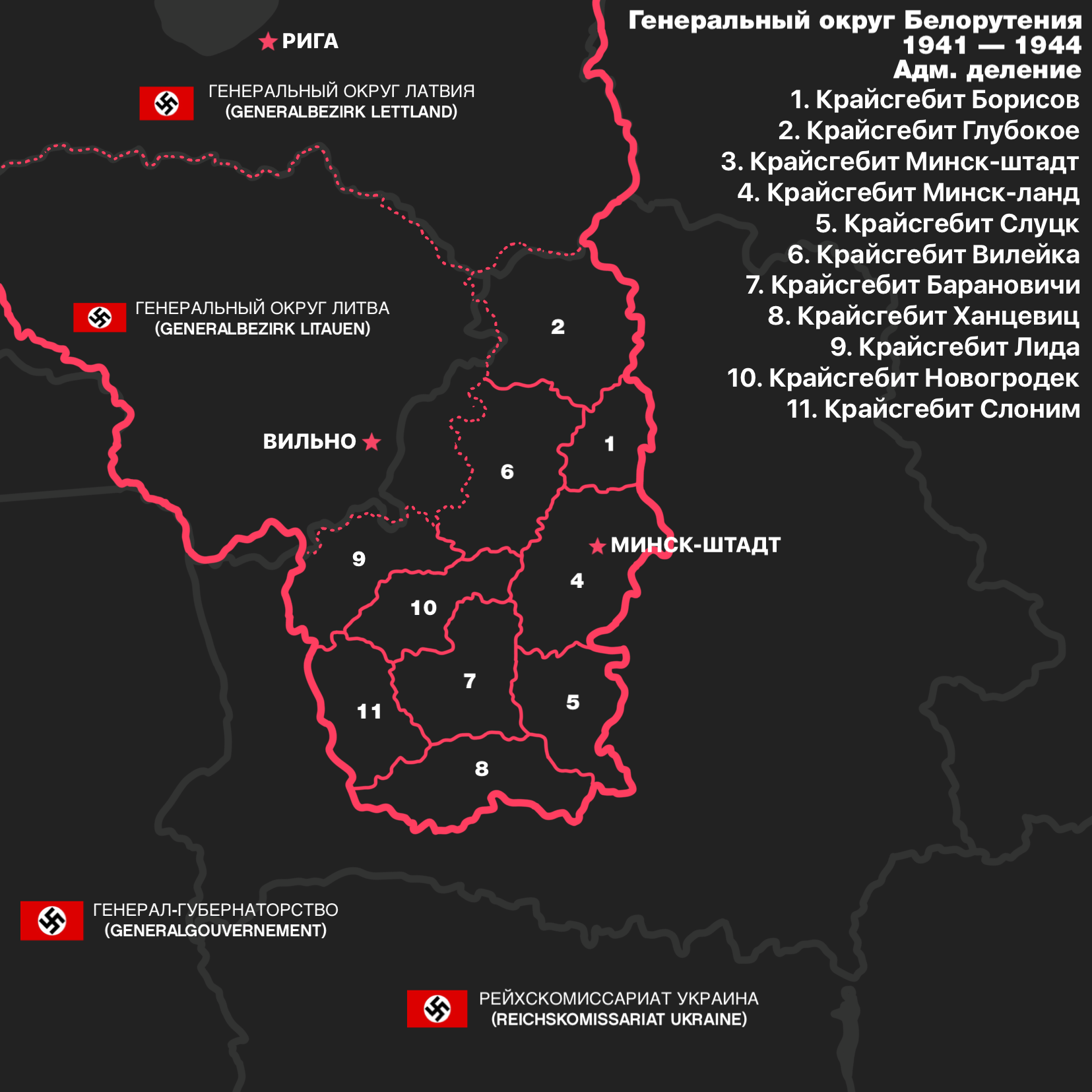
Administrative map of Generalbezirk Weißruthenien

The Belarusian-Polish conflict in the Generalbezirk Weißruthenien was between the Belarusian and Polish national movements under German occupation of Byelorussia during World War II.

== Nazi politics ==
The conflict initially broke out between the collaborators. At the beginning of the occupation, the Germans created an administration of Polish representatives. This caused discontent of the Belarusian collaborators. The figures of the national movement, who supported the Germans, were dissatisfied. Soon the Polish administration was replaced by the Belarusian one. The Nazis began persecuting the Polish people.

Since the autumn of 1941, the Germans gave preference to Belarusians. The occupation authorities feared the strengthening of the Polish national movement, so they supported the Belarusian forces. From the second half of 1943 the repressions stopped.

== Escalation ==
The result of the struggle for the loyalty of the Germans were denunciations. Belarusian and Polish figures accused each other of working for the Communists. There were also military clashes. These were mainly skirmishes between Polish partisans and Belarusian collaborators.

== Results ==
The results of the Belarusian-Polish struggle were controversial. In some regions, the power of Poles has been preserved, and in others, the power of Belarusians has been strengthened.

== Literature ==
- Весялкоўскі Ю. Што прывяло Армію Краёву на Беларусь. — Лондан, 1995.
- Грыбоўскі Ю. Польска-беларускі канфлікт у Генеральнай акрузе «Беларусь» (1941—1944 гг.) // Białoruskie Zeszyty Historyczne, nr 25, 2006, s. 116–167.
- Крывашэй Дз. Беларуска-польскія адносіны ў гады нямецкай акупацыі // Białorunruskie zeszyty historyczne, nr 24, 2005. — s. 153–165.
- Крывашэй Дз. Польская супольнасць Беларусі пад час акупацыі // Беларусь у выпрабаваннях Вялікай Айчыннай вайны: масавыя забойствы нацыстаў, Мн., 2005, с. 139–148.
- Туронак Ю. Беларусь пад нямецкай акупацыяй. — Мн., 1993.
- Stosunki polsko-bialoruskie w wojewodztwie bialostockim w latach 1939–1956, Warszawa 2005.
