= Georgy Zakharov =

Georgy Zakharov may refer to:

- Georgy Zakharov (army general)
- Georgy Zakharov (air force general)
