= Erich Ehrlinger =

Nazi Germany SS commander, war criminal

- Erich Ehrlinger (sometime before 1945)
- Born: October 14, 1910; Giengen an der Brenz, Kingdom of Württemberg
- Died: July 31, 2004 (aged 93); Karlsruhe, Baden-Württemberg, Germany
- Other name: Erich Fröscher
- Organization: Schutzstaffel
- Motive: Nazism
- Convictions: Crimes against humanity in Lithuania, Latvia, Estonia, Belarus, and Russia.
- Penalty: Twelve years imprisonment, later partially remitted

Erich Ehrlinger (14 October 1910 – 31 July 2004) was a member of the Nazi Party (number: 541,195) and SS (number: 107,493). As commander of Special Detachment (Sonderkommando, also known as Einsatzkommando or EK) 1b, he was responsible for mass murder in the Baltic states and Belarus.

He was also the commander of the Security Police (SiPo) and the Security Service (SD) for central Russia as well as a department chief in the Reich Security Main Office (Reichssicherheitshauptamt or RSHA). He eventually rose to the rank of SS-Oberführer.

== Youth and education ==
Ehrlinger was the son of the mayor of Giengen an der Brenz, a small town in southwestern Germany, in what is now the state of Baden-Württemberg. In 1928 he completed high school (Abitur) in Heidenheim, then studied law in Tübingen, Kiel, Berlin. There in 1931 he joined the SA and continued at Tübingen. The nationalist and xenophobic atmosphere at the University of Tübingen (already by 1931 there were no longer any Jewish professors there) fit in well with his later legal career in the SD, the RSHA, and the Einsatzgruppen.

Ehrlinger was not only active at the university. According to his SA certificate of good conduct, "Ehrlinger was one of the few Tübingen-connected students, who even before the seizure of power put himself regularly where he was needed with the propaganda or other service."

== Nazi career ==
After he completed an SA leadership training course in 1934, Ehrlinger gave up his legal career and became a full-time SA functionary. He was the leader of an SA sport school at Rieneck Castle and then a "Training Chief" ("Chef AW" for SA-Ausbildungswesen). In May 1935, Ehrlinger was accepted into the SD. By September 1935, he had been assigned to the main office of the Berlin SD. Ehrlinger was with the SD in 1938 during the Nazi takeover in Austria and in April 1939 in Prague.

=== Crimes during World War II ===
Ehrlinger was with the headquarters staff of Einsatzgruppe IV during the German invasion of Poland in September 1939. In August 1940 he went to Norway for the buildup of the Waffen-SS forces there under his later chief, Franz Walter Stahlecker. In April 1941, he took over leadership of Special Commando (Sonderkommando) 1b, which was part of Einsatzgruppe A, of which Stahlecker was overall commander.

After the beginning of the German invasion of the Soviet Union, on 22 June 1941, Ehrlinger's unit, 70 to 80 men strong, followed behind Army Group North in the Baltic states and the area south of Leningrad. Ehrlinger led the mass murder of Jews behind the front, in particular in the ghettos of Kovno, Dünaburg and Rositten.

For example, on 16 July 1941, the SD entered Dünaburg. Ehrlinger reported that "[a]s of now the EK 1b has killed 1,150 Jews in Dünaburg." Ehrlinger himself oversaw these shootings, euphemistically called "actions", as a "hardened SS perpetrator who stood at the shoot pit and led the killers in the shooting."

In December 1941, after the completion of the work of Einsatzkommando 1b, Ehrlinger was promoted to commandant of the Security Police and SD (Kommandeur der Sicherheitspolizei und des SD or KdS) for central Russia and Belarus, where under his orders many executions were carried out.

In September 1943 Ehrlinger was promoted to SS-Standartenführer (colonel) and went to Minsk where he succeeded Curt von Gottberg as SS and Police Leader for Generalbezirk Weißruthenien. He became the liaison man of SD chief Ernst Kaltenbrunner to the commanding generals of the security troops of Army Group Center, as well as taking over the offices of Einsatzgruppe B chief and Commander of the Security Police and the SD (Befehlshaber der Sicherheitspolizei und des SD or BdS) for central Russia and Belarus. There he was involved with the murder of the remaining Jews of Minsk.

In 1944, Ehrlinger returned to Berlin. On 1 April 1944, he became chief of Department I (Personnel) in the Reich Security Main Office (Reichssicherheitshauptamt or RSHA), replacing Bruno Streckenbach. In November 1944 Ehrlinger also became a special delegate from Ernst Kaltenbrunner to SS chief Heinrich Himmler.

== Post-war ==
At the end of the war, Ehrlinger disguised himself as a Wehrmacht NCO and gave himself up to the British forces under a false name. After a few weeks as a POW, Ehrlinger was released and made his way to the Schleswig-Holstein area. He made contact with his family, but did not provide his whereabouts. In 1947, his wife discovered him under an assumed identity living with another woman with whom he was about to have a baby. They reached an agreement that Ehrlinger would continue to support the family, which he did until 1952. By then Ehrlinger was using his real identity and making a comfortable living. Ehrlinger decided to reduce the alimony payments, making his wife concerned that he was about to emigrate and prompting her to denounce him to the police. Thus alerted, the authorities still took six years to arrest him.

Ehrlinger was finally arrested in December 1958. Ehrlinger was convicted in a 1961 trial in connection with 1,045 cases of murder and was sentenced to 12 years imprisonment. The case was appealed and eventually returned to the public prosecutor's office. His sentence was officially remitted in 1969, four years after he was released from prison.

== See also ==
- (in German) Befehlshaber der Sicherheitspolizei und des SD

== Sources ==
- Bryant, Michael. Eyewitness to Genocide: The Operation Reinhard Death Camp Trials, 1955-1966, Univ. of Tennessee Press, 2014
- Ezergails, Andrew, The Holocaust in Latvia 1941-1944: The Missing Center, ISBN 9984-9054-3-8
- Ingrao, Christian (2013). Believe and Destroy: Intellectuals in the SS War Machine. Malden, MA: Polity. ISBN 978-0-7456-6026-4.
- (in German) Stadlbauer, Peter, Eichmanns Chef: Erich Ehrlinger. Exzellente SS-Karriere und unterbliebene strafrechtliche Sühne. Eine Fallstudie, unveröffentl. Magisterarbeit, Wien 2005
- (in German) Wildt, Michael, Generation der Unbedingten – Das Führungskorps des Reichssicherheitshauptamtes. Hamburger Edition, Hamburg 2003, ISBN 3-930908-75-1
- (in German) Wildt, Michael, Erich Ehrlinger - Ein Vertreter „kämpfender Verwaltung“. In: Klaus-Michael Mallmann, Gerhard Paul: Karrieren der Gewalt. Nationalsozialistische Täterbiographien. Wissenschaftliche Buchgesellschaft, Darmstadt 2004, ISBN 3-534-16654-X.
