= Turzhansky =

Turzhansky is a surname. Notable people with the surname include:

- Boris Turzhansky (1900–1948), Soviet pilot
- Leonard Turzhansky (1875–1945), Russian painter
