= Taranenko =

Taranenko (Ukrainian: Тараненко) is a gender-neutral Ukrainian surname. Notable people with the surname include:

- Iryna Taranenko-Terelia (born 1966), Ukrainian cross-country skier
- Ivan Taranenko (1912–1995), Soviet fighter pilot
- Leonid Taranenko (born 1956), Belarusian weightlifter
