= Karl Schäfer =

Karl Schäfer may refer to:

- Karl Schäfer (figure skater), Austrian figure skater and swimmer
- Karl Schäfer (SS-Brigadeführer), German SS officer
- Karl Emil Schäfer, German pilot in the first world war

== See also ==
- Karl Schaefer, American television producer
