= Soviet Volunteer Group =

- Советские добровольцы в Китае
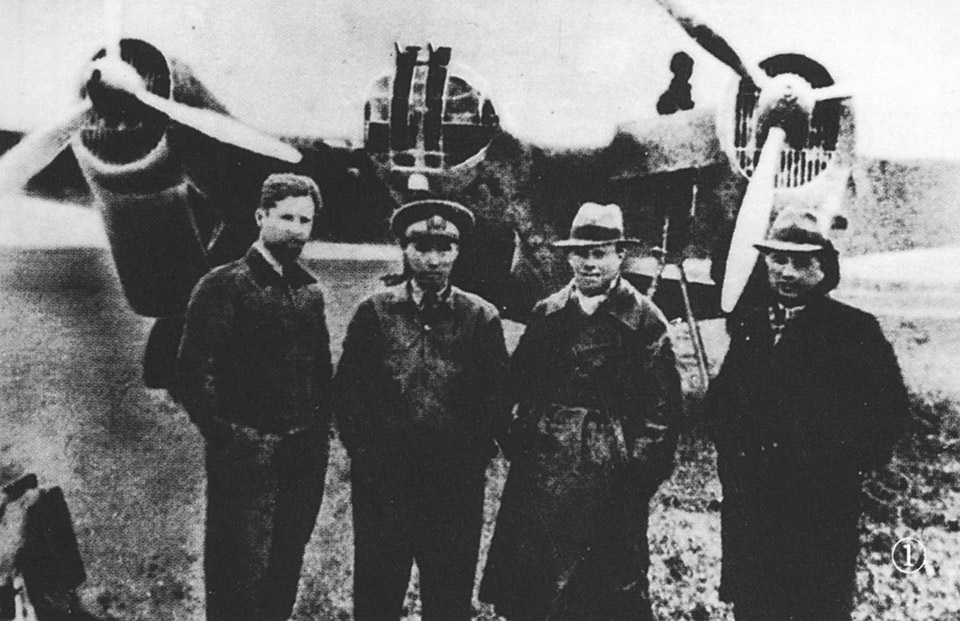
- Soviet aviators at Hankou airfield
- Active: 1937–1941
- Country: Soviet Union
- Allegiance: Republic of China
- Branch: Nationalist Chinese Air Force
- Size: 3,665 pilots and ground crew (peak)
- Garrison/HQ: Nanjing; Nanchang; Lanzhou
- Engagements: Second Sino-Japanese War

Aircraft flown
- Bomber: Tupolev TB-3, Tupolev SB
- Fighter: Polikarpov I-16, Polikarpov I-15

The Soviet Volunteer Group was the volunteer part of the Soviet Air Forces sent to support the Republic of China during the Second Sino-Japanese War between 1937 and 1941. After the Marco Polo Bridge Incident, the Sino-Soviet Non-Aggression Pact was signed leading to considerable Soviet military assistance to China, including the volunteer squadrons. China paid for the support with raw materials.

== Background ==
In the aftermath of the Wall Street crash of 1929 and the subsequent worldwide economic crisis, the Empire of Japan pursued an expansionist policy against its weakened neighbors in the Far East. On 18 September 1931, Japan staged the Mukden Incident using it as a pretext for its invasion of Chinese Manchuria. Japan went on to transform the north–east of China into a puppet state under the name of Manchukuo. In the plans of the Japanese general staff, Manchukuo was to serve as a stepping stone for the future conquest of the rest of China. Facing increasing pressure China strengthened its ties with Germany. Starting from 1933, a German mission headed by Hans von Seeckt provided crucial military support to the government of Chiang Kai-shek, reorganizing the army and providing training and modern arms. German aid began to wane in 1937 and was cut completely in May 1938, as Adolf Hitler realigned himself with Japan and Manchukuo instead.

Sino–Soviet diplomatic ties had been cut following the Sino-Soviet conflict (1929). At the time the Soviet Union was undergoing a country wide program of mass industrialization in preparation for a potential war on two fronts (with Germany and Japan respectively). The establishment of Manchukuo complicated the situation as its territory now housed a colony of 40,000 Soviet citizens working on the Chinese Eastern Railway. Although the Soviets refused to officially recognize the new state, they sold the railway to the Japanese in March 1935, at a cut-rate following a series of Japanese provocations. The Soviets felt unready for a new confrontation with Japan, opting to improve relations with China as a temporary countermeasure. The League of Nations remained silent on the issue of Japanese imperialism, pushing China to reactivate its unofficial communication channels with its only remaining potential ally. The Anti-Comintern Pact, signed on 25 November 1936, erased the last doubts held by both sides regarding the ongoing reconciliation efforts. On 7 July 1937, the Marco Polo Bridge Incident marked the beginning of the Second Sino-Japanese War. On 21 August, China and the Soviet Union signed a non–aggression pact. Although the pact made no mention of Soviet military support, it de facto established a tacit understanding that the Soviets would provide both military and material aid.

In September 1937, a secret decree issued by the Soviet Orgburo ordered that 225 aircraft, including 62 Polikarpov I-15, 93 Polikarpov I-16 and 8 Yakovlev UT-4 trainers, be sent to China. In March and July 1938 as well as in July 1939, China received loans of 50, 50 and 150 million $ respectively, with an annual interest of 3%. The loans were to be repaid through exports of tea, wool, leather and metals. Upon a Chinese request the Soviets also agreed to provide military advisors and volunteer pilots. The first group of military advisors arrived in China in early June 1938. By February 1939, 3665 Soviet military specialists headed by Mikhail Dratvin had been deployed.

== Operation ==
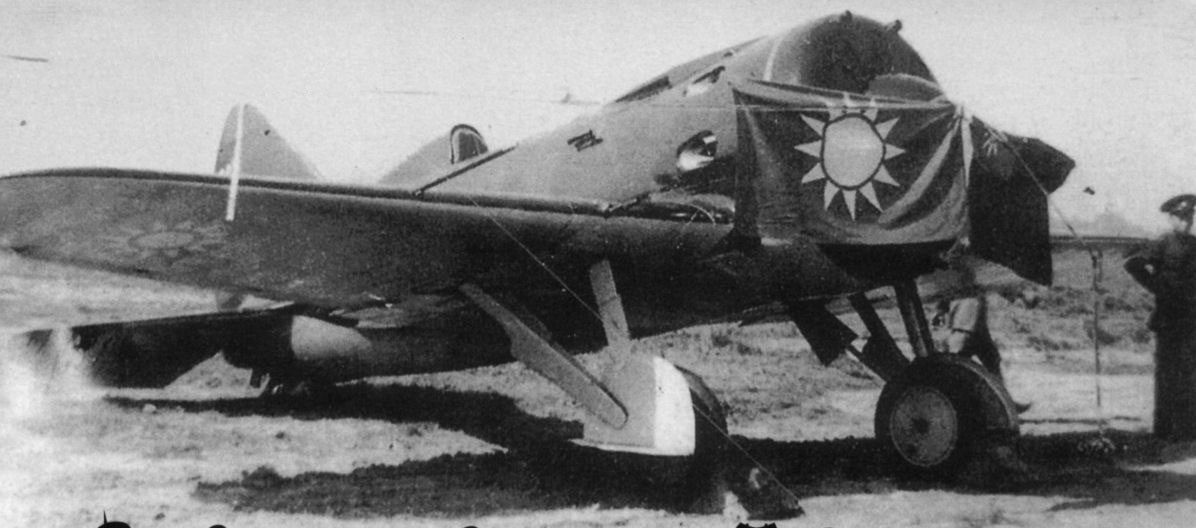
Polikarpov I-16 with Chinese insignia. The I-16 would be the primary fighter plane used by the Chinese Air Force and Soviet volunteers

In October 1937, some 450 Soviet pilots and technicians assembled in Moscow, subsequently traveling to Alma Ata to bring 155 fighter aircraft, 62 bombers, and 8 trainers into China. A highway through the Hexi Corridor to Lanzhou would be constructed to facilitate the overland transport of aircraft among other supplies. The Soviets arrived as private citizens and initially wore civilian clothing, the mission remaining a secret even from their closest relatives. They were instructed to avoid using the term comrade, and in the event of their capture they were to claim that they were former members of the White movement permanently residing in China. Prior to each mission, the pilots changed into Chinese uniforms, whilst their planes were marked with Chinese Air Force insignia. In 1938 the Group bombed Taipei; the physical results of the attack are believed to have been limited but the propaganda impact was significant.

By 1941, there would be 885 Soviet-built aircraft sent to China. Apart from the aforementioned I-15, I-16 and UT-4, the Soviets also supplied Tupolev SB and Ilyushin DB-3 bombers. Six Tupolev TB-3 heavy bombers were provided as well, though these would be lost in accidents before seeing combat. Over 1,200 aircraft had been sent to China by the end of 1941. At the time of the arrival of the first Soviet volunteers, the Chinese Air Force had been reduced to less than 100 serviceable aircraft. These were machines so outdated that the Soviets described them as a "museum of antiquity", and were manned by less than 600 men. Morale was low and the improvement of the situation was hampered by corrupt officials who bought outdated foreign equipment in return for bribes. The Japanese outnumbered the Chinese in the air by a 13:1 ratio and were better trained. Moreover, the Japanese aircraft were faster and equipped with such novelties as night vision devices and radios, easily outmaneuvering and overpowering any opposition.

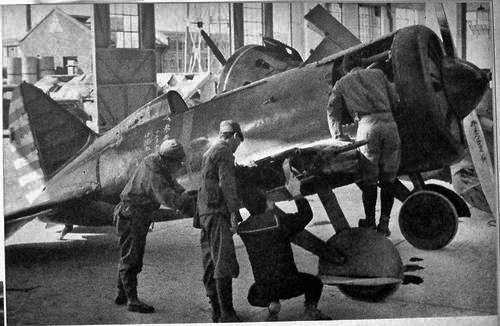
Japanese aircraft engineers examine a captured I-16 with Chinese markings

Although the personnel were briefed on the situation in China and the importance of their participation in the fight against Japan, they were not volunteers; Soviet Air Force commander Aleksandr Loktionov and his deputy Yakov Smushkevich selected the personnel for the Soviet Volunteer Group. At its peak the Soviet Volunteer Group numbered 3,665 personnel, including doctors, drivers, mechanics, meteorologists, cryptographers, radio operators, airfield managers and pilots. 2,000 of these were pilots and 1,000 took part in combat missions. Some of them had been sent directly from the front lines of the Spanish Civil War where the Soviets also had a sizeable military mission. Of the aircraft supplied, half were turned over to the Chinese Air Force and half were flown and maintained by Soviet personnel. The Soviet air units were stationed at bases near the cities of Nanjing, Hankou, and Chongqing, and at Lanzhou in China's northwest at the terminus of the Soviet supply route. On 13 December 1937, the former temporary capital of Nanjing fell to the Japanese, turning the aerodrome of Xiangyang into the main Soviet base. 200 Soviet pilots took part in the defense of the new capital, Hankou, flying in mixed squadrons along with Chinese pilots.

On 23 February 1938, the Soviet Volunteer Group conducted its first operation outside Chinese borders, with 12 and 28 bombers departing from Nanjing and Hankou, respectively. The target was the island of Taiwan, the main base of the Japanese Air Force, which also housed a wide array of cargo ships containing fuel and spare parts intended for the base. Flying at high attitude and approaching the island from the north, the bombers remained undetected until they dropped their payload, safely returning. As a result of the raid the Japanese lost a large shipment of fuel, 40 aircraft were destroyed on the ground, port facilities and hangars were destroyed while several ships sustained minor damages. On 28 April, the Japanese launched a massive air raid on the Wuhan military airport with the intent of celebrating the birthday of emperor Hirohito. At 10:00 a.m. they were met by 60 Soviet I-15 and I-16 fighters. In the largest air battle at that point of the war the Japanese lost 21 aircraft, while Soviet losses were limited to 2. Among those killed was Soviet pilot Lev Shuster, who performed an aerial ramming after running out of fuel and ammunition. On 31 May, 18 Japanese bombers approached Wuhan for a second time, covered by 36 fighters. At the conclusion of the fight, the Japanese bombers missed their targets and 14 of them were shot down by Soviet fighters. By May, Soviet pilots had destroyed 625 enemy aircraft and damaged 150 military and civilian ships. The Soviet squadrons were withdrawn after the signing of the Soviet–Japanese Neutrality Pact in April 1941. As a result, the Chinese turned to the United States, which authorized the creation of the American Volunteer Group Flying Tigers.

== Monuments ==
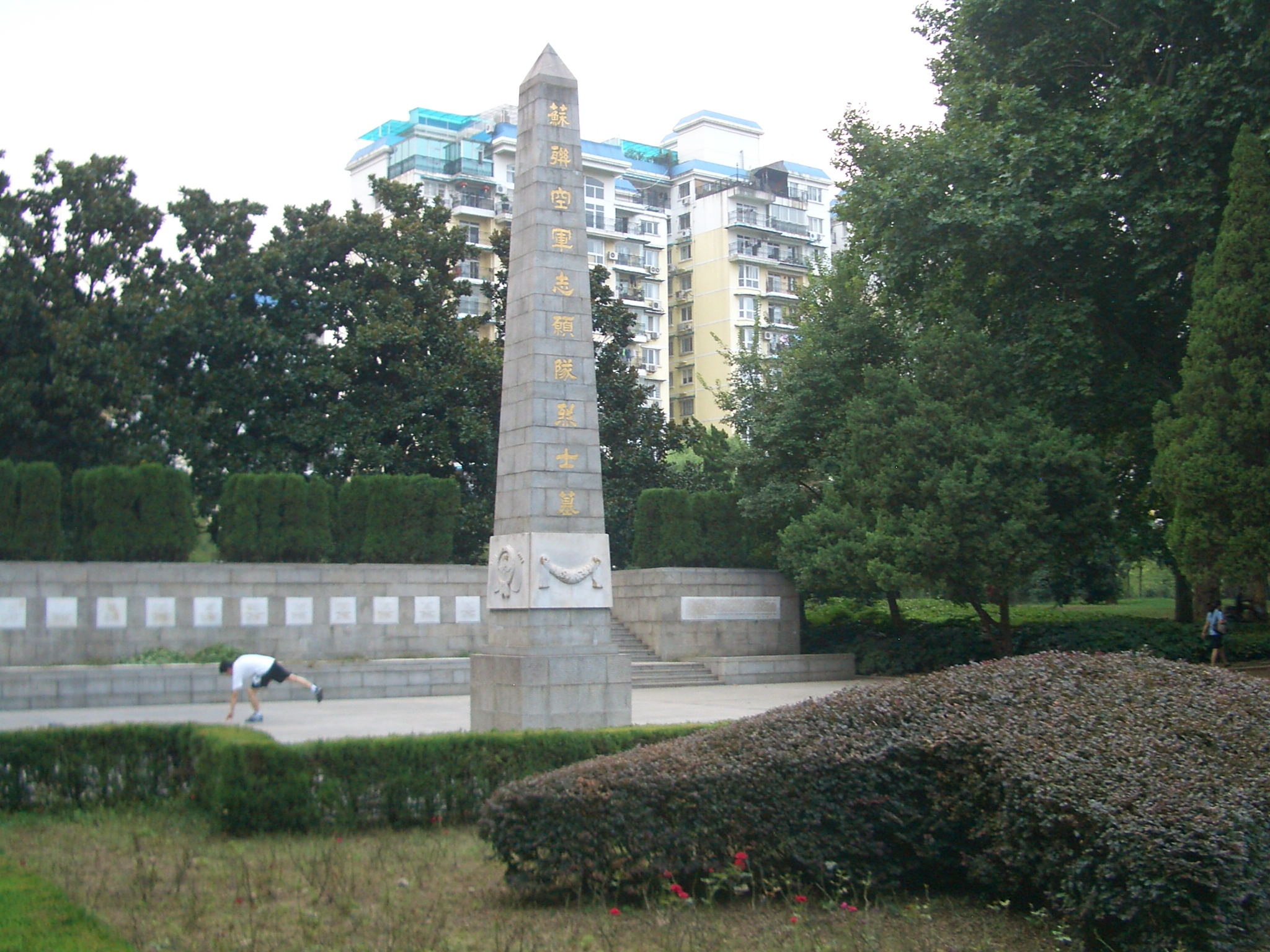
Monument to the Soviet aviators in Wuhan

Distinguished pilots who fought in the unit include Fyodor Polynin, Pavel Rychagov, Sidor Slyusarev, Timofey Khryukin, Stepan Suprun, Grigory Kravchenko, Konstantin Kokkinaki, Georgi Zakharov, Grigory Tkhor and Pavel Zhigarev. Between 1937 and 1940, a total of 236 Soviet pilots were killed in action or in accidents. There are a total of 70 monuments to the Soviet aviators in China. The most notable of which being Jiefang Gongyuan (Liberation Park) in Wuhan, which was built in 1956 and houses the remains of 15 Soviet pilots. The Liberation Park Memorial was renovated in 2008.

== See also ==
- Arthur Chin, among the first group of volunteer Chinese-American combat aviators from before 1937
- American Volunteer Group
