= Yelena Mazanik =

Soviet Belarusian partisan (1914–1996)

- Алена Мазанік
- Born: 2 March 1914; Poddegtyarnaya village, Minsk Governorate, Russian Empire (now Belarus)
- Died: 7 April 1996 (aged 82); Minsk, Belarus
- Awards: Hero of the Soviet Union; Order of Lenin; Order of the Patriotic War, 1st Class

Yelena Grigoryevna Mazanik (Russian: Еле́на Григо́рьевна Маза́ник, Belarusian: Але́на Рыго́раўна Маза́нік, romanized: Aliena Ryhoraǔna Mazanik; 2 March 1914 – 7 April 1996) was a Soviet Belarusian partisan responsible for the assassination of Wilhelm Kube, General-Kommissar of Nazi-occupied Belarus, whom she killed by placing a small time-bomb under his bed while working for him as a housemaid. For assassinating him she and her co-conspirators were awarded the title Hero of the Soviet Union on 29 October 1943 by decree of the Supreme Soviet. Her post-war life was spent as a librarian.

== Early life ==
Mazanik was born on 2 March 1914 to a Belarusian peasant family in the village of Poddegtyarnaya of the Minsk Governorate, then part of the Russian Empire. Her education was average for the time, as she graduated from only six grades of school before leaving in 1931 to work as a waitress at the dining room of the Byelorussian SSR Council of People's Commissars. Soon she married a man by the name of Boleslav Antonovich Tarletsky, who was a chauffeur and an employee of the NKVD. In 1935 she gave birth to a son, but he only lived for a year and a half. After giving birth to her first son she changed jobs to work at the gym of the Belarusian Council of People's Commissars. In 1939 she gave birth to another son, this time very prematurely, and he did not survive. That same year she went back to her previous job working as a waitress.

After the Germans took control of Minsk, Mazanik infiltrated a Wehrmacht unit using the pseudonym of Galina, but later moved on to working as a waitress at a dining hall and casino for German officers until she was recruited to work at the mansion of Wilhelm Kube in June 1943.

== Assassination of Wilhelm Kube ==
=== Planning and preparation ===
By the time Mazanik had begun working as a maid in the Kube mansion, partisans had already been planning his assassination. After receiving authorization from Moscow the partisan detachments in the Minsk area began preparing to liquidate him. On 22 July 1943 they detonated a bomb in a Minsk theater, killing around 70 German soldiers; however, Kube had left the theater just minutes before the bomb went off. On 6 September 1943 after partisans attacked a banquet for German officers they managed to kill 36 high-ranking officials and officers, but because Kube was not present for unknown reasons they did not kill him that day, nor did they when they attempted to ambush him on a road on which he often traveled.

On 8 August 1943, Tatyana Kalita, one of the maids who had worked for Kube, introduced Mazanik to other members of a partisan unit that had been given the task of killing Kube, including Nadezhda Troyan under the pseudonym "Kanskaya" and a man named Artur working for the partisan detachment known as "Dyadi Koli". In a series of meetings, Mazanik agreed to kill Kube, either using an explosive or poison, but not before waiting for her sister Valentina Shchutskoi to confirm the identity of Mariya Osipova and Nikolai Pokhlebayev, who had introduced Osipova to Mazanik while Troyan was trying to get her to agree to a task. Before carrying out the assassination they made plans for her family to be evacuated from Minsk because they would undoubtedly face retaliation. She then met with several other partisans, and after a few bumps in the road Mariya Osipova provided Mazanik with a bomb and a poison capsule in case she was caught. Originally they planned to poison Kube with arsenic, but Mazanik did not want to do that because there were children in Kube's mansion who might eat the food they would poison.

=== Execution of the plot ===
On the night of 21 September 1943 Mazanik, with the assistance of her sister Valentina, set the bomb to go off in 24 hours. At 6:30 the next morning she wrapped the small bomb in a handkerchief and placed it in her purse before leaving to observe a mass execution. Meanwhile, Valentina and the rest of her family were packing their possessions into carts and leaving Minsk for partisan-controlled areas of the forest.

The guards standing at the entrance to Kube's mansion did not pay much attention to the maids they knew worked for Kube, but nevertheless tried to see what was under the handkerchief in Mazanik's bag; however, she managed to stop them from lifting it enough to see the bomb by interrupting them by saying it held a gift for Kube's wife Anita. After entering the house Mazanik went to the bathroom and hid the bomb under her dress.

At 10:00 am Kube left for his job while his older children attended school. Anita and her youngest child went on a shopping trip, leaving only Mazanik and one other servant in the house; she then entered Kube's bedroom and planted the small bomb under his bed between the mattress and springs. At about the same time Mazanik's family were leaving the city for the forest. After planting the bomb Mazanik left the apartment, saying she was going to go to the doctor for a toothache. At 1:20 am on 22 September 1943, the bomb under Kube's bed went off forty minutes early, killing him. His pregnant wife was not hurt because she had been sleeping in a different bed at the time. A truck had evacuated Mazanik from Minsk and she was never apprehended by the Nazis, but over 1,000 people in Minsk were forced to dig their own mass grave and were shot in collective punishment inflicted on the city.

Late at night on 12 October all of the conspirators in the plot were flown out of Belarus to Moscow, and after writing the final report on the mission the partisans were interrogated by Vsevolod Merkulov, Bogdan Kobulov, and Fyodor Kuznetsov at the Lubyanka. On 29 October 1943 the three main conspirators, Mazanik, Troyan, and Osipova, were awarded the title Hero of the Soviet Union.

=== Other parties who claimed responsibility ===
Soviet intelligence agencies had assigned the task of killing Kube to twelve different partisan units, several leaders of which assumed that their members were the ones who executed the plot when they got news of his death. One leader of a partisan unit in Belarus, Stepan Kazantsev, claimed that a prisoner in the Minsk ghetto by the name of Leo Lieberman had planted the bomb under Kube's bed. While Lieberman did work at Kube's mansion, Kazantsev's claims that Lieberman was the assassin did not hold up to scrutiny. Another partisan group, nicknamed "The Avengers" claimed they were responsible and that Mazanik was a member of their unit, but this was considered erroneous.

== Postwar life ==
Mazanik did not remarry after the end of the Second World War. In 1946 she joined the Communist Party before graduating from the Minsk Pedagogical Institute in 1952. She later worked as the deputy director of the Main Library of the Academy of Sciences of the Byelorussian SSR. She died on 7 April 1996 and was buried in the Eastern Cemetery of Minsk.

== See also ==
- List of female Heroes of the Soviet Union
- Soviet partisans
