= Mariya Osipova =

Soviet Belarusian partisan (1908–1999)

- Марыя Осіпава
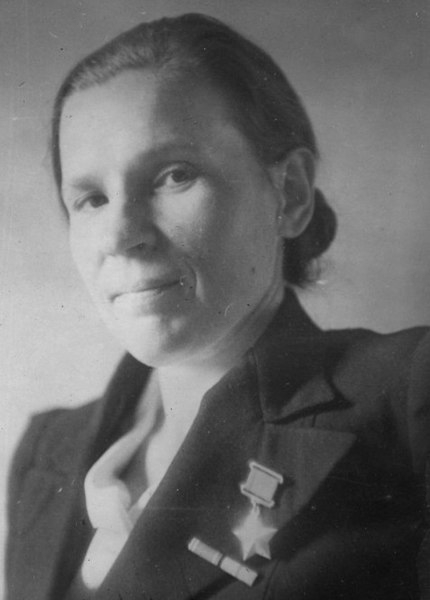
- Osipova in 1944
- Born: Mariya Borisovna Sokovtsova; 27 December 1908; Serkavitsy, Mogilev Governorate, Russian Empire (now Belarus)
- Died: 5 February 1999 (aged 90); Minsk, Belarus
- Awards: Hero of the Soviet Union; Order of Lenin; Order of the Patriotic War, 1st Class

Mariya Borisovna Osipova (Belarusian: Марыя Барысаўна Осіпава, romanized: Maryja Barysaǔna Osipava, Russian: Мари́я Бори́совна О́сипова; 27 December 1908 – 5 February 1999) was a Soviet Belarusian partisan who provided Yelena Mazanik with the bomb she used to kill Wilhelm Kube, Generalkommissar of Nazi-occupied Belarus. For doing so, Osipova and her co-conspirators were awarded the title Hero of the Soviet Union on 29 October 1943.

== Early life ==
Osipova was born to a Belarusian peasant family in Serkavitsy, in the Mogilev Governorate of the Russian Empire. She started working at a glass factory at the age of 13 and was the chairman of her young pioneer chapter. In 1924 she met her husband, Yakov Osipov, while she was delegate to the 6th Komsomol Congress. Later she married and changed her surname from Sokovtsova to Osipova. In 1928 she became a member of the Communist Party and graduated from the Agricultural School of Minsk in 1935. She then went on to attend law school, which she graduated from in 1940 before serving at the Supreme Court of the Byelorussian SSR. She left her job at the Supreme Court to work as an assistant at a law practice in May 1941, just a few weeks before the start of the war.

== World War II ==
=== Early resistance activities ===
Shortly after German forces took over Minsk, Osipova worked with a teacher at the law school where she had previously studied to organize a resistance movement that would be headquartered at the school. The partisan group started off with 14 members, but by 1943 the organization had 50 active members. Initially the organization printed anti-Axis leaflets, provided hiding for the city's Jews facing persecution, and helped Soviet prisoners of war escape from German custody. After the group contacted a partisan detachment in 1941, the organization began conducting reconnaissance and sabotage missions against the German military. By late 1941 the group was in communication with the Communist Party of Byelorussia. Since then, Osipova served as the communication liaison between her unit and several other partisan units including the "Dima" unit commanded by D. Keimakh, the "Mestnyye" unit commanded S. Vaupshasov, the "Dyadi Koli" brigade commanded by N. Nikitin, the "Zheleznyak" brigade commanded by I. Titkov, and the "200th" unit named in honor of K. Rokosovsky. She also wrote for the underground newspaper "Zvezda" that was circulated throughout German-occupied Minsk. The partisans sheltered prisoners of war and Jewish refugees in their attics. On sabotage operations the partisans would steal weapons and medicine from the German military, stockpile them, and provide them to other partisans and refugees as needed. Osipova's pseudonym was Chernaya.

=== Assassination of Wilhelm Kube ===
Osipova's best known accomplishment as a partisan was the assassination of high-ranking SS official and General-Kommissar of Nazi-occupied Belarus Wilhelm Kube, who oversaw the Minsk Ghetto. In late 1941 the deputy commander of the "Dima" unit tasked Nadezhda Troyan with finding someone who worked inside Kube's house and would be willing to assist in a plot to kill him. Valentina Shchutskoi, who was the sister of Yelena Mazanik, suggested that Mazanik, who worked in Kube's mansion as a maid, would be suitable for the task. Troyan took a while to gain the trust of Mazanik, who was very afraid of betrayal, but after her sister Valentina confirmed the identity of Osipova for her she agreed to try to kill Kube. After explaining the plot and discussing the best methods to do it, it was decided to plant a bomb under Kube's bed. Before Mazanik placed the bomb, Osipova and Troyan left Minsk for the forest controlled by partisans, along with their families and most of Mazanik's family. Osipova gave Mazanik a small magnetic mine which she carried in her purse, having obtained the mine from a partisan unit. The assassination went as planned and after Kube was killed, she, Mazanik, and Troyan were declared Heroes of the Soviet Union.

== Later life ==
After the end of the war Osipova returned to Minsk to participate in the reconstruction of the war-torn city. She later worked in the office of Vasily Kozlov, Chairman of the Presidium of the Supreme Council of the Byelorussian SSR, and from 1947 to 1963 she was a deputy in the Supreme Soviet of the Byelorussian SSR. She had also headed the pardon department of the Presidium of the Supreme Council of Belarus and worked to get many members of the Minsk resistance rehabilitated after myths spread that the Minsk resistance was engaged in collaboration with the Nazis. She died at the age of 90 on 5 February 1999 and was buried in the Eastern Cemetery of Minsk.

== See also ==
- List of female Heroes of the Soviet Union
- Soviet partisans
