= Karl Schäfer (SS-Brigadeführer) =

SS and Police Leader and SS-Brigadeführer

- Born: 17 June 1892; Gorlitz, Kingdom of Saxony, German Empire
- Died: 2 November 1943 (age 51); Krivoi Rog, Reichskommissariat Ukraine
- Military career
- Allegiance: German Empire; Nazi Germany
- Branch: Imperial German Navy; Schutzstaffel
- Service years: 1914–1918; 1931–1943
- Rank: SS-Brigadeführer and Generalmajor of Police
- Commands: SS and Police Leader, "Weissruthenien"; "Dnjepropetrowsk-Krivoi Rog"
- Conflicts: World War I World War II
- Awards: Iron Cross, 1st and 2nd class Wound Badge in silver

Karl Schäfer (17 June 1892 – 2 November 1943) was a German SS-Brigadeführer and Generalmajor of Police who served as an SS and Police Leader in the Soviet Union, where he was killed in action during the Second World War.

== Early life ==
Schäfer was born in Gorlitz and, after his secondary education, worked as a translator in German South West Africa from 1911 to 1914. On the outbreak of the First World War, he joined the Imperial German Navy in August 1914 and served throughout the war, earning the Iron Cross, 1st and 2nd class and the Wound Badge in silver. He was an early member of the Nazi Party, joining in 1922. He left the Party after the failed Beer Hall Putsch in November 1923 but rejoined in August 1930 (membership number 419,439).

== Peacetime SS career ==
In October 1931, Schäfer became a member of the SS (member number 20,865). He served with the 35th SS-Standarte based in Kassel. He was commissioned an SS-Sturmführer on 1 December 1932 and served as a company and battalion commander in that unit. From 7 May 1934 to 1 April 1936, Schäfer was the commander of the 35th SS-Standarte in Königsberg. He was next given command of SS-Abschnitt (SS District) XXII, with headquarters in Allenstein until 1 March 1937. On that date he was transferred to the command of SS-Abschnitt XII, based in Frankfurt, and would retain this command until his death.

== Second World War ==
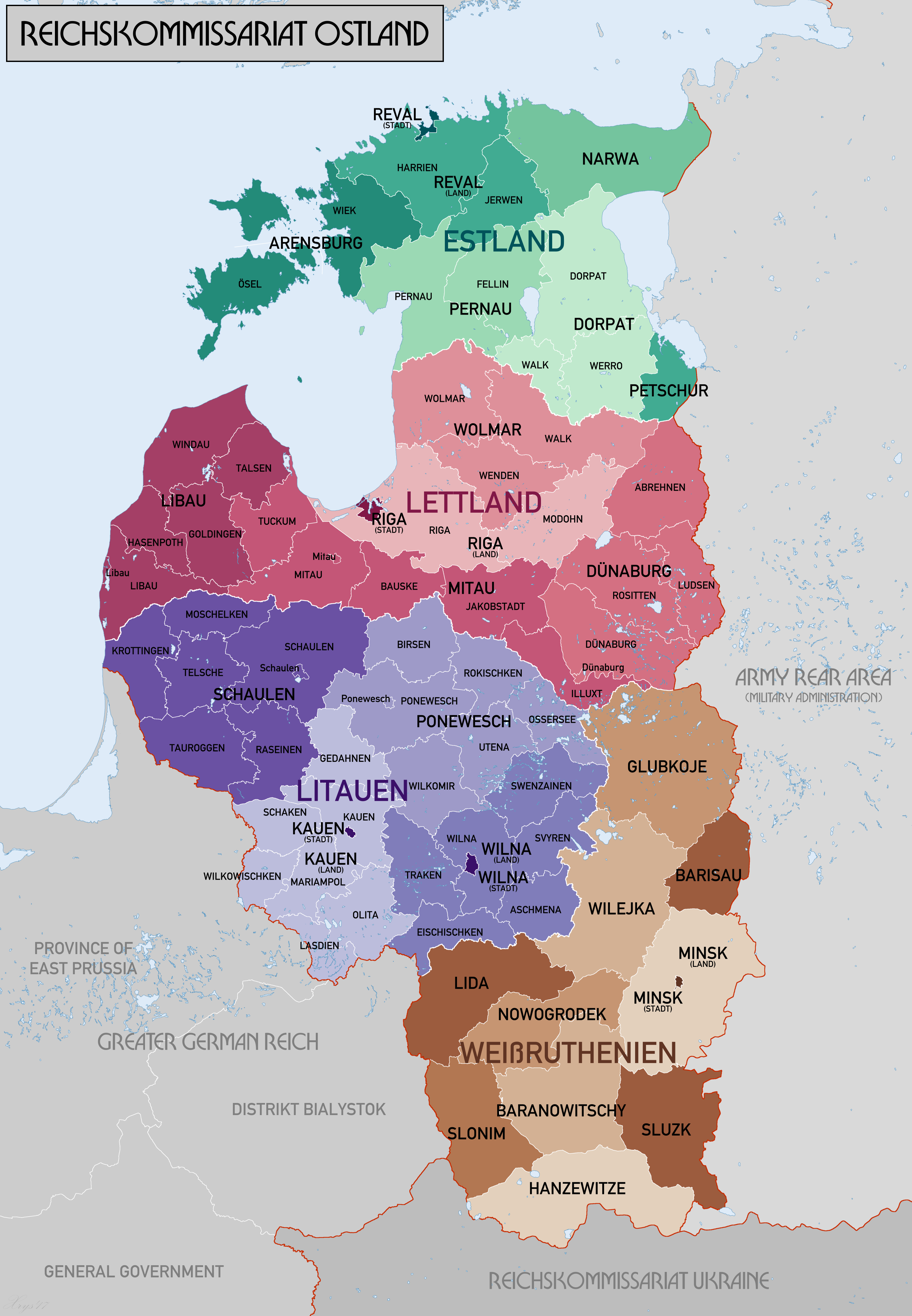
Reichskommissariat Ostland, where Schäfer held SSPF commands in three of the four Generalbezirke (General Districts).

After the German invasion of the Soviet Union in 1941, Schäfer was posted to the Reichskommissariat Ostland where he would hold several important regional commands. He first served briefly as the Acting SS and Police Leader (SSPF) "Lettland" in Riga from 7 to 25 April 1942. He then went on to serve as the Acting SSPF "Litauen" in Kaunas from 25 April to 22 May 1942. On that date he became the permanent SSPF "Weissruthenien" in Minsk and served there until 21 July when he was succeeded by SS-Brigadeführer Curt von Gottberg. At that point he was transferred to the staff of SS-Oberabschnitt (SS Main District) "Weichsel" in Danzig for two months, and then was posted to the staff of the Higher SS and Police Leader (HSSPF) "Russland-Süd," SS-Obergruppenführer Hans-Adolf Prützmann.

On 4 October 1942, Schäfer succeeded SS-Brigadeführer Hermann Harm as SSPF "Dnjepropetrowsk-Krivoi Rog" in the Reichskommissariat Ukraine under Prützmann's command. His activities here largely consisted of anti-partisan warfare. Just over a year later, Schäfer was killed in action near Krivoi Rog on 2 November 1943. He was the last holder of this post, as by then the area was being overrun by the Soviet Red Army and the command was disbanded.

SS and Police Ranks
| Date | Rank |
|---|---|
| December 1932 | SS-Sturmführer |
| July 1933 | SS-Sturmhauptführer |
| November 1933 | SS-Sturmbannführer |
| November 1934 | SS-Obersturmbannführer |
| April 1935 | SS-Standartenführer |
| September 1936 | SS-Oberführer |
| June 1943 | SS-Brigadeführer and Generalmajor of Police |

== Sources ==
- Schiffer Publishing Ltd., ed. (2000). SS Officers List: SS-Standartenführer to SS-Oberstgruppenführer (As of 30 January 1942). Schiffer Military History Publishing. ISBN 0-7643-1061-5.
- Yerger, Mark C. (1997). Allgemeine-SS: The Commands, Units and Leaders of the General SS. Schiffer Publishing Ltd. ISBN 0-7643-0145-4.
