= Carl Zenner =

German Nazi politician and SS-Brigadeführer

- Born: 11 June 1899; Oberlimberg, Rhine Province, Kingdom of Prussia, German Empire
- Died: 16 June 1969 (aged 70); Andernach, Rhineland Palatinate, West Germany
- Military career
- Allegiance: German Empire; Nazi Germany
- Branch: Imperial German Army; Schutzstaffel
- Service years: 1917-1919; 1926–1945
- Rank: SS-Brigadeführer and Generalmajor of Police
- Commands: Police President of Aachen, 1937–1943; SS and Police Leader, "Weißruthenien"
- Conflicts: World War I; World War II
- Awards: Iron Cross, 2nd class War Merit Cross, 1st and 2nd class with Swords

Carl Peter Zenner (11 June 1899 – 16 June 1969) was a German Nazi Party politician and an SS-Brigadeführer who served as SS and Police Leader in Generalbezirk Weißruthenien during the Second World War. An active participant in the Holocaust, he was convicted and jailed for crimes against humanity.

== Early life ==
Zenner was born in the village of Oberlimberg, the son of a quarry manager. He attended Volksschule in Brohl and Gymnasium in Andernach. He joined the Imperial German Army in 1917 and fought in the First World War with the 9th Foot Artillery Regiment, earning the Iron Cross, 2nd class. After the war, he became a member of the Freikorps between January and the end of September 1919, serving in the Baltic, and in Hamburg to suppress disorders associated with the Spartacist uprising. He studied economics and business administration at a commercial college in Cologne beginning in October 1920 and graduating in December 1921 with a degree in business administration. He then worked in business in Brohl until the end of 1931.

== Peacetime Nazi career ==
Zenner joined the Nazi Party in August 1925 (membership number 13,539). He then worked for the party until 1928 as the Ortsgruppenleiter (local group leader) in Koblenz and the Bezirksleiter (district leader) of the Koblenz-Trier district. As an early Party member, he later would be awarded the Golden Party Badge. In addition, he was an active propagandist as a Gau and Reich speaker until 1933. He became an early member of the SS (membership number 176) on 1 August 1926. During the occupation of the Ruhr, he was briefly jailed but subsequently acquitted in April 1927 by a French court-martial in Koblenz for breaching the peace. Later in June, he was sentenced to a fine for Nazi activities in Mainz.

Zenner unsuccessfully sought seats in both the Landtag of Prussia and the Reichstag at the elections of May 1928. From 1929 to 1933, he was a member of the Ahrweiler Kreistag (district council) and became Deputy Bürgermeister (mayor) of the city of Ahrweiler. He was elected to the Reichstag from electoral constituency 21 (Koblenz-Trier) in the election of July 1932, but lost his seat in November 1932. After the Nazi seizure of power, Zenner was returned to the Reichstag in March 1933 and retained this seat until the end of the Nazi regime.

Commissioned an SS-Sturmführer on 2 April 1930, Zenner was promoted to SS-Standartenführer on 8 August 1931 and formed SS units in Koblenz, Trier, and Aachen. From 1 January 1932 to 5 April 1934, he commanded the 5th SS-Standarte, based in Brohl. Leaving Brohl in April 1934, he served until 1 January 1935 as the commander of SS-Abschnitt (District) IV, headquartered in Braunschweig. Promoted to SS-Oberführer on 5 April 1934, Zenner became the chief-of-staff of SS-Oberabschnitt (Main District) "Süd" in Munich from January 1935 to 15 January 1937. He then transferred to police duties and served in the SS Main Office. From 1937 to July 1942 he was an honorary civilian judge at the People's Court. From May 1937 until January 1943 he was Police President of Aachen. During his time as chief of the police force in Aachen, the Kristallnacht pogrom of 9–10 November 1938 took place, in which 70 Jews were arrested and sent off to concentration camps, Jewish homes and shops were looted and the synagogue was burned down.

== Second World War ==
On 21 June 1941 Zenner was promoted to SS-Brigadeführer. On 14 August 1941 he took a leave of absence from Aachen and was appointed SS and Police Leader (SSPF) "Weißruthenien," headquartered in Minsk. On 26 September 1941 he was given the additional position of Generalmajor of Police. His time in Minsk was marked by the height of the Holocaust in Belarus and his direct involvement is noted in the following:

Zenner voluntarily offered his troops and his authority in order to help the Einsatzgruppen - in this case Sonderkommando 1b - to kill the Jews. Zenner's participation was particularly evident during the action against the Jews of the Minsk ghetto, from November 7–11, 1941, during which, according to Operational Situation Report No. 140, 6,624 Jews were shot. The officer nominally in charge of the Sonderkommando … asked Zenner for help, and Zenner was more than willing to oblige. Not only did he promise the Ukrainian Hiwis under his command as the execution squad, he effectively took charge of the entire operation, from the clearing of the ghetto to the closing of the mass graves. Zenner supplied the manpower and the vehicles for the action, including the Order Police units that rounded up the Jews, the forces that guarded the execution site, and, of course, the shooters … Zenner was the mastermind of the operation.

Zenner was also involved in developing the anti-partisan campaign in the areas behind the front lines. Leaving his Minsk SSPF post on 22 May 1942, he worked as a special duty SSPF setting up the German plan to deal with the threat coming from Soviet partisan groups. He was the author of a report dated 13 June 1942 that analyzed the situation and recommended actions to combat it, including clearing all trees and brush within 300 meters of roads and railways to reduce the potential for ambush. He also recommended heightened mobility by strengthening motorized contingents of police units, including the use of armored personnel carriers. Increased levels of pursuit troops were to hunt down and kill all partisans. To this end, he proposed the formation of specialized combat groups (Kampfgruppe) and the use of airplanes in close support. Submitting his report directly to Reichsführer Heinrich Himmler, Zenner breached protocol and embarrassed his direct superiors, SS-Obergruppenführers Friedrich Jeckeln and Erich von dem Bach-Zelewski. By July, Bach-Zelewski, the leader of the anti-partisan campaign, dismissed Zenner from his post, allegedly for insufficient pursuit of the anti-partisan campaign. He was reassigned to Berlin to become head of the requisitioning office (Amt B-II) in the SS Main Office. Charged with dereliction of duty in September 1942, the Supreme SS and Police Court dropped the proceedings against him in December 1943. He remained in his Berlin post until the end of the war.

== Postwar life and prosecutions ==
After the end of the war, Zenner was taken prisoner by the French on 29 May 1945 and interned. Eventually he was handed over to a British military tribunal and, on 12 June 1947, was sentenced to five years in prison and a 5,000 Reichsmark fine for his role in the Kristallnacht pogrom. After his release from prison on 13 June 1950, he worked in business as a managing director in Brohl.

Rearrested in 1961, Zenner was put on trial in the Koblenz Regional Court for the murder of the 6,624 Jewish men, women and children from the Minsk Ghetto. Despite his unconvincing denial of any involvement or even knowledge of the massacre, on 12 June 1961 he was convicted and sentenced to 15 years in prison. He was released from prison on health grounds in 1967, and died in 1969.

== Sources ==
- Blood, Philip W. (2011). Hitler's Bandit Hunters: The SS and the Nazi Occupation of Europe. Potomac Books, Inc. ISBN 978-1-597-97445-5.
- Klee, Ernst (2007). Das Personenlexikon zum Dritten Reich. Wer war was vor und nach 1945. Frankfurt-am-Main: Fischer-Taschenbuch-Verlag. ISBN 978-3-596-16048-8.
- Langerbein, Helmut (2004). Hitler's Death Squads: The Logic of Mass Murder. Texas A&M University Press. ISBN 978-1-585-44285-0.
- Schiffer Publishing Ltd., ed. (2000). SS Officers List: SS-Standartenführer to SS-Oberstgruppenführer (As of 30 January 1942). Schiffer Military History Publishing. ISBN 0-7643-1061-5.
- Yerger, Mark C. (1997). Allgemeine-SS: The Commands, Units and Leaders of the General SS. Schiffer Publishing Ltd. ISBN 0-7643-0145-4.
