= Wilhelm Kube =

German politician and Nazi official (1887–1943)

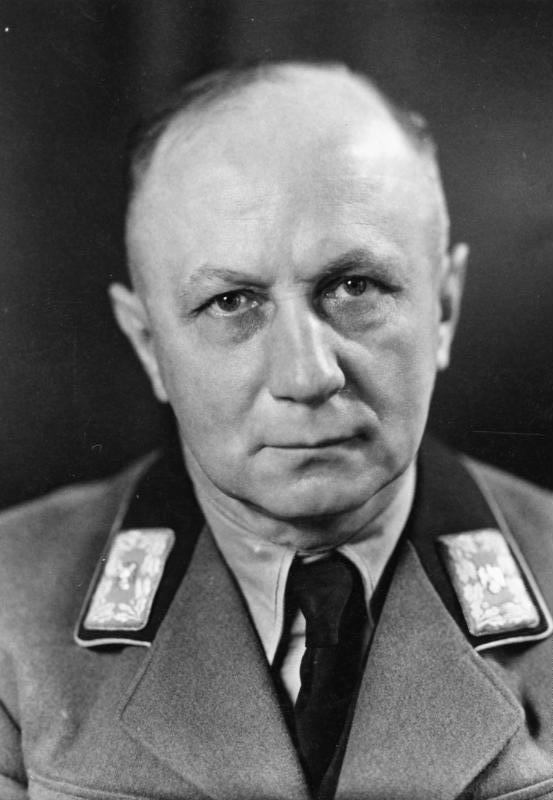
- Kube in 1942

Generalkommissar for Generalbezirk Weißruthenien
- In office 17 July 1941 – 22 September 1943
- Preceded by: Position created
- Succeeded by: Curt von Gottberg

Oberpräsident of Posen-West Prussia
- In office 18 July 1933 – 7 August 1936
- Preceded by: Hans von Meibom
- Succeeded by: Emil Stürtz

Oberpräsident of Brandenburg
- In office 29 May 1933 – 7 August 1936
- Preceded by: Adolf Meier
- Succeeded by: Emil Stürtz

Gauleiter of Gau Kurmark
- In office 1 June 1933 – 7 August 1936
- Succeeded by: Emil Stürtz

Gauleiter of Gau Ostmark
- In office 1 February 1928 – 1 June 1933

Personal details
- Born: 13 November 1887 Glogau, Silesia, Kingdom of Prussia, German Empire
- Died: 22 September 1943 (aged 55) Minsk, RK Ostland
- Cause of death: Assassination
- Party: Nazi Party
- Education: History, economics and theology
- Alma mater: University of Berlin

Military service
- Allegiance: Nazi Germany
- Rank: Generalkommissar

Wilhelm Kube (13 November 1887 – 22 September 1943) was a German Nazi politician and official who served as the Generalkommissar of Generalbezirk Weißruthenien in the Reichskommissariat Ostland from 1941 to 1943.

Kube was involved in numerous far-right and antisemitic organisations before becoming a leader of the Nazi Party in the Free State of Prussia from 1928 to 1933. Kube was an important figure in the German Christian movement and the Gauleiter of Gau Kurmark during the early years of Nazi rule. Kube was removed from all of his offices and forced out of the SS in 1936 due to a scandal over his personal feud with Walter Buch.

Kube was rehabilitated into the SS by Heinrich Himmler in 1940 and appointed Generalkommissar of Generalbezirk Weißruthenien based in Minsk shortly after the German invasion of the Soviet Union. Kube was a participant in the Holocaust and approved numerous war crimes against Jewish people in western Belarus, having said: "What plague and syphilis are to humanity, are Jews to the white race" though his relatively mild treatment of German Jews during his early rule was controversial. Kube under pressure from his SS superiors was fully compliant in the extermination of German Jews by 1942.

Kube was assassinated by Soviet partisan Yelena Mazanik with a bomb in 1943.

== Early life ==
Wilhelm Kube was born on 13 November 1887 in Glogau, Prussian Silesia (present-day Głogów, Poland) the son of tax collector Richard Kube and his wife Ida (née Kadach). Kube was raised in Berlin and attended the Gymnasium zum Grauen Kloster, a prestigious gymnasium where he developed a reputation for his anti-semitic remarks. From 1908 to 1912, he studied history, economics and theology at the Royal Friedrich Wilhelm University of Berlin. He was active in the Völkisch movement as a student and a member of the Berlin chapter of the anti-semitic German Student Association. In 1911, he received a Moses Mendelssohn Scholarship, ironically named in honour of Moses Mendelssohn, a German-Jewish philosopher and theologian. In 1917, during World War I, Kube was briefly conscripted into the Imperial German Army, but his service was quickly deferred due to his position as general-secretary of the German Conservative Party in Silesia. Kube worked as a journalist for a number of conservative newspapers after the war, and joined the German National People's Party (DNVP) in 1919 when the German Conservative Party merged into it. He co-founded the Bismarck Youth, the DNVP's youth wing, and became leader of that organisation in 1922. He became general-secretary of the Berlin DNVP in 1920 and sat on the Berlin City Council from 1922 to 1923.

== Nazi Party ==
Kube first became involved with Nazism in 1923 when he left the DNVP, believing it not militant enough, and instead joined the more radical German Völkisch Freedom Party (DVFP) which had splintered from the DNVP a year earlier. At the time, the DVFP had a close relationship with the National Socialist Freedom Movement (NSFP), the legal replacement of the Nazi Party that had been banned after the failed Beer Hall Putsch. In May and December 1924, Kube was elected to the Reichstag from the NSFP electoral list though he was not an official member, and served until May 1928. In February 1925, the NSFB was dissolved when the Nazi Party reformed after its ban expired in January and Adolf Hitler had been released from prison. Kube continued his affiliation with the DVFP, but infighting within the party led to his expulsion in 1926. Members from northern and eastern Germany also left the DVFP with Kube to join the Nazi movement.

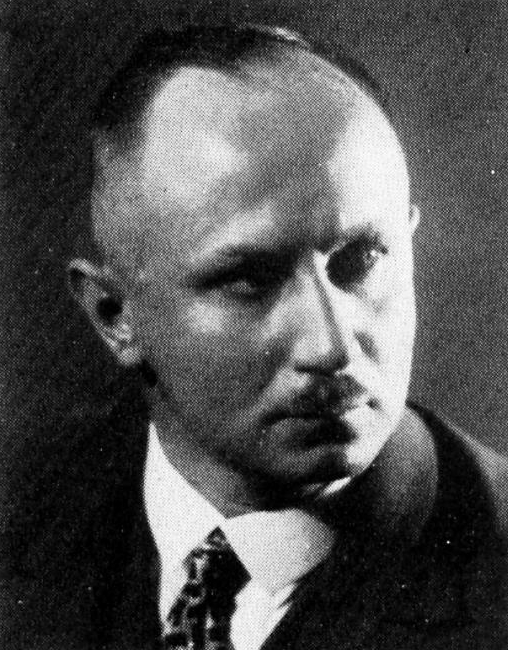
Kube's official Landtag portrait, 1932

Kube joined the Nazi Party (membership number 71,682) in late 1927 and soon became the leader of the party in the Prussian Landtag. Under his leadership, the Nazi Party in Prussia grew from a tiny faction of 6 seats in 1928 to be the largest party in the Landtag by 1932. On 1 February 1928, he was appointed Gauleiter (regional party leader) of Gau Ostmark with his seat at Frankfurt an der Oder. At the July 1932 election, Kube returned to the Reichstag as a deputy from electoral constituency 5 (Frankfurt an der Oder. On 1 June 1933, Kube's Gau Ostmark was merged with the neighboring Gau Brandenburg to form Gau Kurmark, which was later reorganized as the Gau March of Brandenburg with its seat in Berlin. After the Nazis came to national power in 1933, he was made Oberpräsident of the Prussian provinces of Brandenburg and Posen-West Prussia, thus uniting under his leadership the highest party and governmental offices in the provinces. On 14 September 1933, he was appointed to the Prussian State Council by Prussian Minister-President Hermann Göring. Kube joined the SS on 29 September 1933 with the rank of SS-Oberführer and on 27 January 1934, he was promoted to SS-Gruppenführer. In November 1933 and March 1936, he was again returned as a Nazi deputy to the Reichstag from constituency 5, Frankfurt an der Oder. He retained a Reichstag seat until the fall of the Nazi regime, being elected from the Nazi electoral list in April 1938. On 9 September 1935, Kube was made a member of the Academy for German Law.

== Nazification of Christianity ==
Kube remained an active Christian as well as a zealous Nazi, becoming one of the leading supporters of the Nazification of Christianity. In 1932, he organised the list of candidates of the Faith Movement of the German Christians for the ordinary election of presbyters and synodals within the Evangelical Church of the old-Prussian Union on 13 November that year. The German Christians then gained about a third of all seats in presbyteries and synods. Kube was elected as one of the presbyters of the congregation of Gethsemane Church in Prenzlauer Berg, Berlin. The presbyters elected him from their midst as synodal into the competent deanery synod (German: Kreissynode; Berlin then comprised 11 deaneries altogether), and these synodals again elected him a member of deanery synodal board (German: Kreissynodalvorstand). He remained active in the German Christian movement which sought to "Nazify" the 28 Protestant Landeskirche (church bodies) in Germany. For 23 July 1933, Hitler ordered an unconstitutional, premature re-election of all presbyters and synodals, with the German Christians now gaining 70–80% of the seats, so Kube could then further advance as head of the Berlin synod of the old Prussian Church. Following the German conquest of Poland in 1939, his Nazi party domain was extended to include Reichsgau Danzig-West Prussia and Reichsgau Wartheland.

== Accusations and removal from office ==
In late 1935, the Supreme Party Court under Chairman Walter Buch, the father-in-law of Martin Bormann, began an investigation into Kube due to allegations of adultery and corruption in running his Gau, including nepotism, favoritism and a dictatorial management style. In December, Kube was issued a letter of reprimand and, swearing revenge, sent an anonymous letter claiming that Buch was married to a "half-Jew". This, of course, would have far-reaching implications not only for Buch but for Bormann, whose wife consequently also was accused of not being a pure Aryan. Kube was leveling serious charges at two Party Reichsleiters. In the course of a Gestapo investigation, it came to light that the letter had been written by Kube. Buch and Bormann saw to it that Kube was removed from all of his posts on 7 August 1936. Only on Hitler's orders was he allowed to retain the title of Gauleiter, albeit without a Gau. Furthermore, owing to a dispute with Reinhard Heydrich over a search conducted of Kube's mistress' apartment, he offered his resignation from the Allgemeine SS on 11 March 1936; he was officially discharged on 1 April.

In 1940, Kube was rehabilitated by Reichsführer-SS Heinrich Himmler and reinstated as a full member of the SS with the rank of Rottenführer (Squad Leader). He was appointed to Dachau concentration camp in Bavaria.

== Generalkommissar of White Ruthenia ==
On 17 July 1941, in the wake of the German invasion of Soviet Union, Kube was appointed General Commissioner (Generalkommissar) for Generalbezirk Weißruthenien (General District White Ruthenia), one of the four districts of Reichskommissariat Ostland. Kube, with his headquarters in Minsk, was responsible for Nazi civil administration over the western half of Byelorussian SSR. In this role, he oversaw the extermination of the large Jewish population of this area and crushing the partisan resistance. He pursued a policy of tolerance towards the non-Jewish Belarusian population and sought to prevent them from supporting partisans by both concessions and force. Nazi propaganda lightly endorsed Belarusian nationalism in White Ruthenia, including use of the "white-red-white flag" and distinguishing Belarusians from Russians. He declared Belarusian as the co-official language alongside German. On 9 September 1941, Kube made an announcement to the population stating that those found in possession of firearms or ammunition were to be shot.

Kube was outraged by the Slutsk Affair (or Slutsk Massacre) in October 1941, when Einsatzgruppen (mobile death squads) of the SS and the Lithuanian Auxiliary Police liquidated the Jewish ghetto in Slutsk without his authority. Many non-Jewish Belarusians were also killed in the sloppy operation, creating great resentment among the population. Kube wrote in protest to his supervisor and SS chief Himmler:

The town was a picture of horror during the action. With indescribable brutality on the part of both the German police officers and particularly the Lithuanian partisans, the Jewish people, but also among them Belarusians, were taken out of their dwellings and herded together. Everywhere in the town shots were to be heard and in different streets the corpses of shot Jews accumulated. The Belarusians were in greatest distress to free themselves from the encirclement.

The letter concluded:

I am submitting this report in duplicate so that one copy may be forwarded to the Reich Minister. Peace and order cannot be maintained in Belarus with methods of that sort. To bury seriously wounded people alive who worked their way out of their graves again is such a base and filthy act that the incidents as such should be reported to the Führer and Reichsmarschall.

Despite these misgivings, Kube participated in an atrocity at the Minsk Ghetto on 2 March 1942. During a search by German and Belarusian police, a group of children were seized and thrown into pits of deep sand to die.

At that moment, several SS officers, among them Wilhelm Kube, arrived, whereupon Kube, immaculate in his uniform, threw handfuls of sweets to the shrieking children. All the children perished in the sand.

== Holocaust ==
Kube was actively involved in the Holocaust and governed an area located at the heart of the Pale of Settlement, where there was a particularly high population of Jews. He began to distinguish between "German Jews" (German-speaking Jews from Central Europe) versus the "non-German Jews" (mostly Yiddish-speaking Jews from Eastern Europe). His less hostile view of German Jews is shown in his behaviour towards those deported to Minsk in late 1941. He was particularly incensed by the presence of deportees who were Mischlings or had been decorated for their service in World War I. On at least one instance, he was able to arrange for the transfer of a Jewish decorated World War I veteran to Theresienstadt. The man, Karl Loewenstein, survived the war there. His interest in these Jews, whom he regarded as belonging "to our cultural milieu," prompted him to file a complaint with the Reich Security Main Office and Heydrich, in which he stated that "during the evacuation of Jews from the Reich, the guidelines on who was to be evacuated had not been properly observed" and he attached a list of names. During the 2 March 1942 massacre, Kube withheld German Jews from a mass shooting, which was conducted in Minsk under the supervision of Sturmbannführer Eduard Strauch, at which 3,412 Jews were killed. This unprecedented act provoked a formal complaint from the SS, according to which "Generalkommissar Kube appears to have promised to the German Jews, who before my time were delivered to the ghetto five thousand strong, that life and health would remain theirs". Kube told Strauch that his methods were "unworthy of a German person and a Germany of Kant and Goethe". Strauch wrote a letter to Erich von dem Bach recommending Kube's dismissal, accusing him of being unable to differentiate between a German and a German Jew, his open appreciation for the ethnically Jewish composers Jacques Offenbach and Felix Mendelssohn, warning the Minsk Judenrat about an upcoming "resettlement", and calling a policeman a "pig" for shooting a Jew. Heydrich flew to Minsk to deliver Kube a reprimand, after which he felt compelled to comply with extermination actions. On 31 July, he wrote to his friend, the Reichskommissar for the Ostland, Hinrich Lohse, in Riga:

Following lengthy talks with the SS-Brigadeführer Zenner and the extraordinarily diligent head of the SD, SS-Obersturmbannführer Strauch, in the last two weeks in White Russia we have liquidated roughly 55,000 Jews....In the city of Minsk about 10,000 Jews were liquidated on 28 and 29 July. Of these, 6,500 were Russian Jews, predominantly women, children, and the aged; the rest were Jews unfit for labor, mainly from Vienna, Brünn, Bremen, and Berlin. The latter had been sent to Minsk last year in accordance with the Führer's orders....In Minsk proper there are 2,600 Jews from Germany left.

By March 1942, Kube's preferential treatment of German Jews appeared to come to an end after pressure from his superiors within the SS. In the spring of 1942, contrary to the opinion of SS-Obersturmführer Kurt Burkhardt, he ordered the resumption of mass murders in the ghettos, which had been interrupted during the winter months because of the frozen ground. He justified this with the fear of the spread of epidemics in the ghettos. In an order dated 8 September 1942, Kube stressed that "the strong presence of Jews among the [partisans]" could only be counteracted by "cleansing the country of Jews". In May 1943, Kube demonstrated a gas chamber to a delegation of Italian fascists. Kube planned to level Minsk and replace it with a German settlement called Asgard.

== Assassination ==
At 1:20 am on 22 September 1943, Kube was assassinated in his Minsk apartment by a time-detonated bomb hidden in his mattress. The bomb was placed by Yelena Mazanik, a Belarusian Soviet partisan who was hired in Kube's household as a maid and was convinced to assassinate him. According to an alternate version, the explosives were set up by Lev Liberman from the Minsk Ghetto, who was also employed in the household, but this later proved to be false. In total, 12 groups received an order from Moscow to assassinate Kube. The bomb went off 40 minutes early, purportedly due to higher air temperature than that during bomb testing. SS-Gruppenführer Curt von Gottberg, the SS and Police Leader of White Ruthenia, temporarily replaced Kube as Generalkommissar.

In retaliation for the assassination, the SS killed more than 1,000 male citizens of Minsk. Owing to Kube's antagonistic attitude to some SS anti-Jewish actions, Himmler felt that the dead man had been well on the way to booking himself a place in a concentration camp anyway, and reportedly described the assassination as a "blessing".

Mazanik escaped the reprisals and continued to fight with the partisans. On 29 October 1943, she was awarded the title Hero of the Soviet Union, along with other members of the assassination group Nadezhda Troyan and Mariya Osipova. After the war she went on to become deputy director of the Fundamental Library of the Belarusian Academy of Sciences.
