= Generalbezirk Weißruthenien =

Nazi occupation regime in Belarus 1941-1944

Generalbezirk Weißruthenien Belarusian: Генеральная акруга Беларусь
- Generalbezirk of Reichskommissariat Ostland
- 1941–1944
- Flag of Nazi Germany Emblem

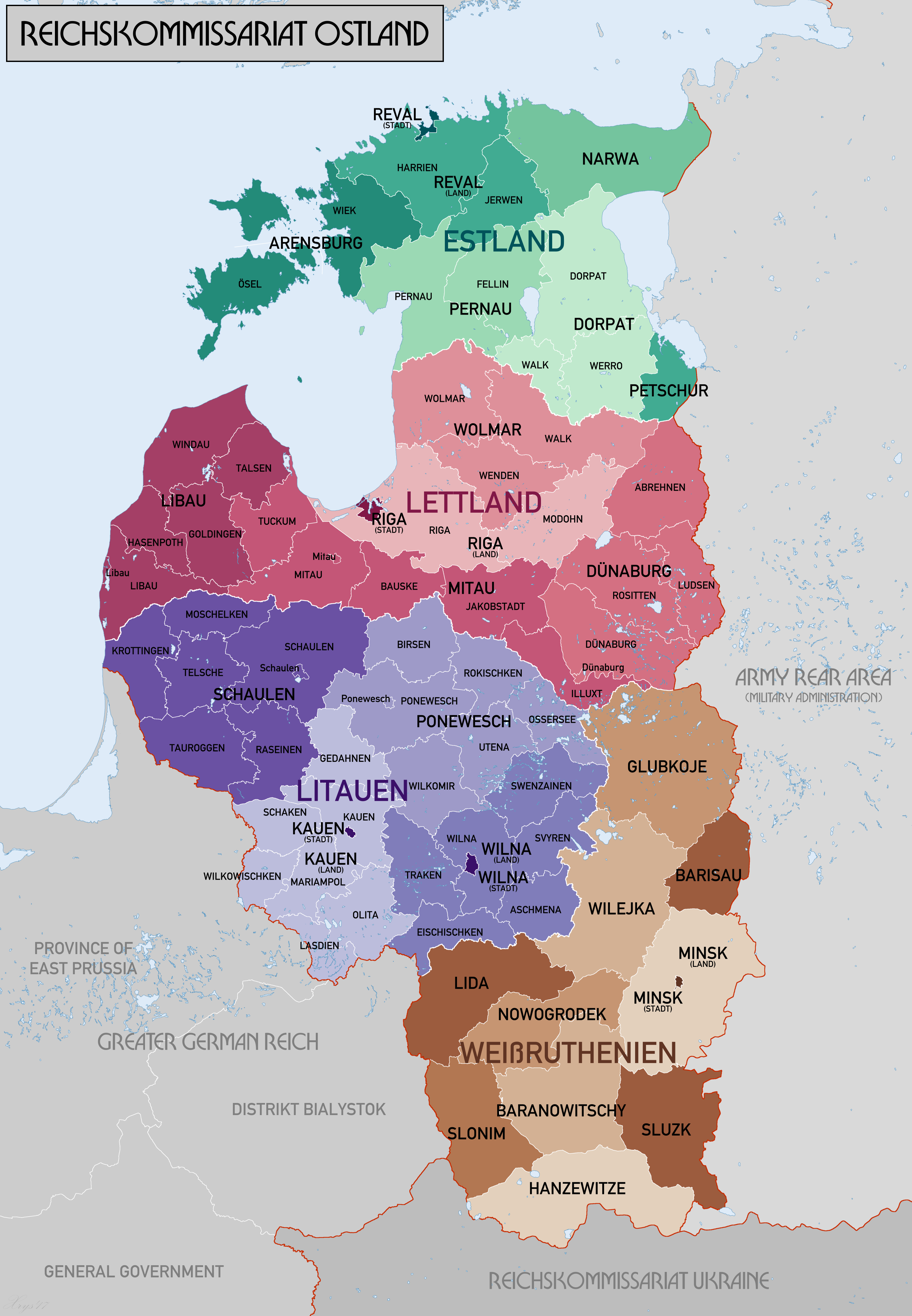
- Map of Generalbezirk Weißruthenien (in shades of brown) within the Reichskommissariat Ostland
- Capital: Minsk
- Government: Civil administration
- Generalkommissar
  - 1941-1943: Wilhelm Kube
  - 1943-1944: Curt von Gottberg
- SS and Police Leader
  - 1941: Jakob Sporrenberg
  - 1941-1942: Carl Zenner
  - 1942: Karl Schäfer
  - 1942-1943: Curt von Gottberg
  - 1942-1943: Erich Ehrlinger
- Historical era: World War II
  - Established: 1 September 1941
  - Dissolved: 1 August 1944
Preceded by
Army Group Centre Rear Area
- Today part of: Belarus

Generalbezirk Weißruthenien (Belarusian: Генеральная акруга Беларусь; lit. 'General District White Ruthenia') was an administrative subdivision of the Reichskommissariat Ostland of Nazi Germany that covered western Belarus from 1941 to 1944. It served as the Nazi civilian administration for the German occupation of Belarus during World War II, and supervised the collaborationist Belarusian Central Council of Radasłaŭ Astroŭski.

Wilhelm Kube was the Generalkommissar of Generalbezirk Weißruthenien until his death in 1943. Kube was succeeded by SS and Police Leader Curt von Gottberg who served as Generalkommissar for the remainder of its existence.

== Organization and structure ==
Generalbezirk Weißruthenien was established in the Byelorussian SSR (Belarus) on 1 September 1941, the third of the four administrative districts of Reichskommissariat Ostland. It was organized on the territory of German-occupied Byelorussia, primarily the West Belarus region (including the Wilno and Nowogródek regions of the eastern territories of Poland annexed by the Soviet Union) which had until then been under the military administration of the Wehrmacht's Army Group Centre.

Minsk was the capital of Generalbezirk Weißruthenien and the Belarusian Central Council, a puppet government led by Radasłaŭ Astroŭski set up by the Germans with Belarusian collaborators to administer the territory. The Belarusian Central Council had a limited role in governing and mostly served as a facade for the German administration.

On 1 April 1944, Generalbezirk Weißruthenien was detached from Reichskommissariat Ostland and was subordinated directly to the Reich Ministry for the Occupied Eastern Territories.

== Administrative divisions ==
Generalbezirk Weißruthenien was subdivided into Gebiete (areas). According to different sources, it had from as few as 9 to as many as 39 such subdivisions, some of them planned but never transitioned from military to civilian administration. These were to be subordinated to four or five Hauptgebiete (main areas) headquartered in Baranowitschi, Minsk, Mogilew, Witebsk, and possibly Smolensk.

== Civil and police leadership ==
Civil administration was led by a Generalkommissar (General Commissioner) directly appointed by Adolf Hitler, and who reported to Ostland Reichskommissar Hinrich Lohse, headquartered in Riga. In addition, police and security matters were overseen by an SS and Police Leader (SSPF) directly appointed by Reichsführer-SS Heinrich Himmler, and who reported to the Higher SS and Police Leader (HSSPF) Ostland und Russland-Nord in Riga, SS-Gruppenführer Hans-Adolf Prützmann until 1 November 1941, and SS-Obergruppenführer Friedrich Jeckeln until 1 April 1943. At that point, jurisdiction was transferred to the HSSPF "Russland Mitte" (Central Russia) headed by SS-Obergruppenführer Erich von dem Bach-Zelewski until 21 June 1944, and SS-Gruppenführer Curt von Gottberg from that date forward.

- Generalkommissar: Wilhelm Kube (17 July 1941 – 22 September 1943). On 22 September 1943, Kube was assassinated by a bomb placed in his house by a Soviet partisan. He was succeeded by the SS and Police Leader, SS-Gruppenführer Curt von Gottberg (22 September 1943 – 1 August 1944).
- SS and Police Leader: SS-Gruppenführer Jakob Sporrenberg (21 July – 14 August 1941); SS-Brigadeführer Carl Zenner (14 August 1941 – 22 May 1942); SS-Oberführer Karl Schäfer (22 May – 21 July 1942); SS-Gruppenführer Curt von Gottberg (21 July 1942 – 22 September 1943); SS-Standartenführer Erich Ehrlinger (22 September 1943 – 1 April 1944).

== Holocaust ==
Precise demographic data on the Jewish population of Generalbezirk Weißruthenien in August 1941 is not available, but it is likely there were over 300,000 Jews. The area was in the heart of the Pale of Settlement, and ten of thousands of Jewish refugees had arrived from central and western Poland in the fall of 1939, but many of them were deported to the Soviet interior before June 1941. A further unknown figure is the number of Jews who were evacuated or fled in time or were recruited into the Red Army. As an example, of the 70,998 Jews registered in Minsk in 1939, it is estimated that about 55,000 remained when the Germans invaded on 28 June 1941. By 1944, it is estimated that roughly 800,000 Byelorussian Jews, or about 90% of the Jewish population of Byelorussia, were murdered.

Following the German invasion, the Nazi death squads of Einsatzgruppe B immediately began the systematic murder of Jews. Following a massive wave of killings between mid-May and the end of July 1942, Kube reported that in the 10 weeks, 55,000 Jews had been liquidated. Only in the districts of Baranowitsche and Hansewitschi were such large operations still to be conducted, especially in Baranowitsche, where about 10,000 Jews remained. The escape of up to 20,000 Jews from the Jewish ghettos to the Soviet partisans forced the Germans to accelerate the liquidations of ghettos. By the spring of 1943, ghettos remained only in a few locations, including Minsk, Lida, Nowogródek, and Głębokie. In October 1943, the Minsk Ghetto, the largest ghetto in the Nazi-occupied Soviet Union, was the last in Generalbezirk Weißruthenien to be liquidated, and nearly all of its nearly 100,000 detainees perished.

== Dissolution ==
On 22 June 1944, the Red Army launched Operation Bagration into Byelorussia which rapidly encircled and defeated most German forces in the region. On 29 June 1944, the Red Army launched the Minsk offensive and, on 3 July, the city fell. On 1 August, administration of those parts of Byelorussia still under German occupation reverted to military administration of Army Group Centre under the command of Walter Model, and Generalbezirk Weißruthenien effectively ceased to exist. Gottberg was transferred to the Waffen-SS to become commander of XII SS Corps on the Western Front.

== See also ==
- German occupation of Byelorussia during World War II
- The Holocaust in Belarus
