= Pavel Tarasov (pilot) =

- Павел Тимофеевич Тарасов
- Born: 21 September 1914; Igren, Yekaterinoslav Governorate, Russian Empire
- Died: 29 July 1944 (aged 29); Ukmergė, Lithuanian SSR, USSR
- Military career
- Allegiance: Soviet Union
- Branch: Soviet Air Force
- Service years: 1934—1944
- Rank: Major
- Conflicts: World War II; Invasion of Poland; Winter War; Eastern Front
- Awards: Hero of the Soviet Union

Pavel Timofeevich Tarasov (Russian: Павел Тимофеевич Тарасов; 21 September 1914 — 29 July 1944) was a Soviet fighter pilot during World War II. Awarded the title Hero of the Soviet Union on 13 April 1944 for his victories, by the time of his death his tally stood at 31 solo plus and one shared shootdowns.
