= Grigory Tkhor =

Major general of the Soviet Air Force

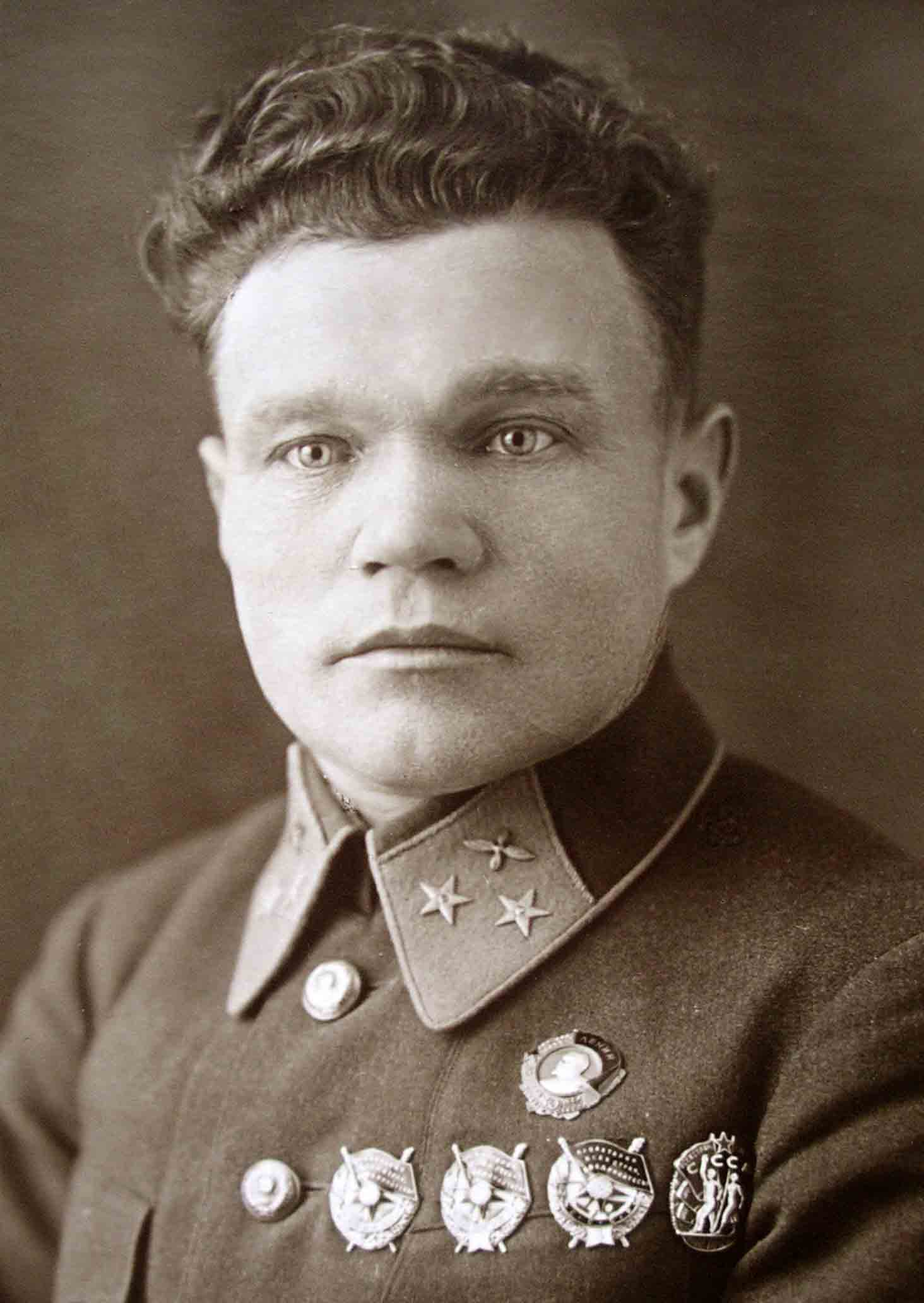
- Born: 28 September 1903; Podlipnoe, Russian Empire
- Died: January 1943 (aged 39) Nuremberg, Nazi Germany
- Allegiance: Soviet Union
- Branch: Soviet Air Force
- Rank: Major general
- Conflicts: Spanish Civil War; Second Sino-Japanese War; World War II; Battle of Kiev
- Awards: Hero of the Soviet Union

Grigory Tkhor (Russian: Григорий Илларионович Тхор; 28 September 1903 [O.S. 8 June], in Podlipnoe – January 1943, in Nuremberg) was a Soviet aviator, Spanish Civil War and Second Sino-Japanese War volunteer, and major general of the Soviet Air Force. He was captured during the course of the Battle of Kiev (1941). He was imprisoned in a number of concentration camps, and repeatedly tortured, until his execution by firing squad in January 1943. He was posthumously decorated with the title Hero of the Soviet Union.

== Biography ==
Grigory Illarionovic Tkhor was born on 28 September 1903, in the village of Podlipnoe, Konotop Raion. He belonged to a family of ethnic Ukrainian farmers. After graduating from a five grade school, he went on to work at his father's farm. In 1923 he enlisted into the Red Army. In 1924 he graduated from an infantry academy, subsequently commanding various infantry formations. In 1931, he graduated from a school for navigator pilots, in 1935 he became a pilot. He commanded a number of squadrons until 1937 when he was promoted to a command a brigade belonging to the 64th Heavy Bomber Division.

Tkhor fought in the Spanish Civil War, flying 102 combat missions in support of the Republican forces. He then served as deputy commander of the Transbaikal Military District's air force. In late April 1938, Tkhor's heavy bomber squadron left Irkutsk, to join the Soviet Volunteer Group fighting on the Chinese side in the Second Sino-Japanese War. The unit made stops in Mongolia, Suzhou and Lanzhou, before reaching its final destination Hankou. In China, Tkhor distinguished himself as an able pilot who was able to fly on a variety of aircraft, that Chinese pilots had previously discarded as unserviceable. He simultaneously acted as a senior advisor in the Republic of China Air Force. On 4 August 1939, he was granted the rank of Kombrig.

Upon his return from China, Tkhor was transferred to the Kiev Military District where he held the position of deputy commander of the 62nd Heavy Bomber Division under the rank of major general. In May 1941, he graduated from the Military Academy of the General Staff of the Armed Forces of Russia. At the outbreak of Operation Barbarossa he took part in the defense of the Ukrainian border. His plane was shot down in a dogfight at the closing stage of the Battle of Kiev (1941), he landed behind enemy lines and was found unconscious by a German patrol. He was initially taken to the Moabit detention center where he refused to become a turncoat despite being subjected to torture. He was subsequently detained in Oflag-XIII D, a prison in Nuremberg and the Flossenbürg concentration camp. During this time frame he was questioned regularly, often returning on blood soaked stretchers. He was executed by a firing squad in January 1943. Details about his captivity and death were declassified 15 years after the end of the war.

== Awards ==
Tkhor was awarded with the Order of the Badge of Honour in 1936. He had been decorated with the Order of the Red Banner on three occasions (1937, 1937, 1938), he received the Order of Lenin in 1939. On 26 June 1991, Mikhail Gorbachev posthumously awarded him with the title Hero of the Soviet Union, citing his bravery during the course of World War II.
