= Nadezhda Troyan =

Soviet Belarusian partisan, assassin of Wilhelm Kube (1921–2011)

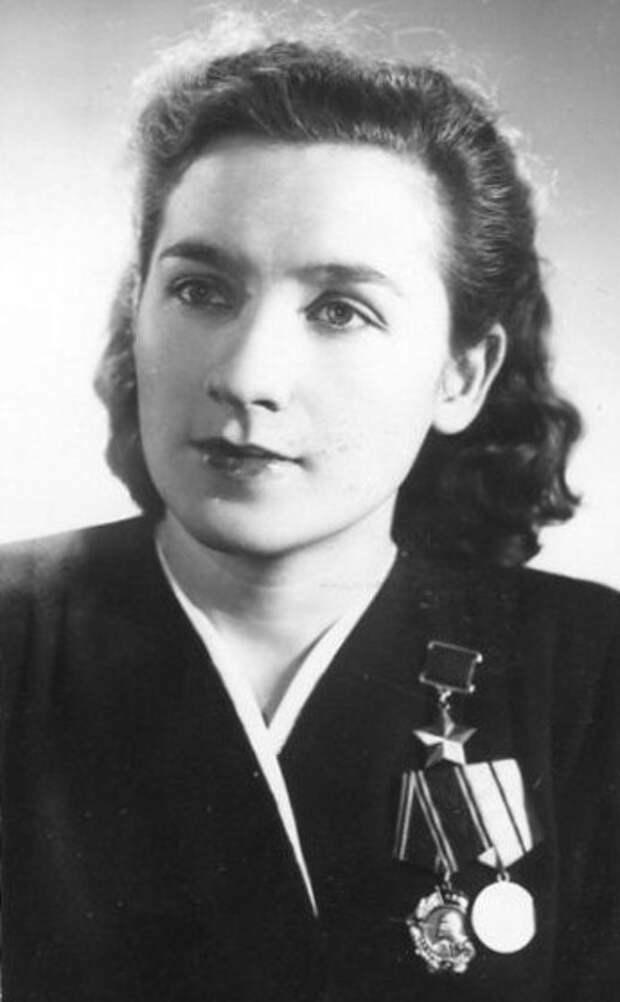
- Troyan in c. 1943–1948
- Native name: Надзея Віктараўна Траян
- Born: 24 October 1921; Drissa, Byelorussian SSR. Soviet Union (now Verkhnyadzvinsk, Belarus)
- Died: 7 September 2011 (aged 89) Moscow, Russia
- Allegiance: Soviet Union
- Conflicts: World War II
- Awards: Hero of the Soviet Union; Order of the Red Banner of Labour (2); Order of the Red Star

Nadezhda Viktorovna Troyan (Belarusian: Надзея Віктараўна Траян, Nadzieja Viktaraŭna Trajan; Russian: Надежда Викторовна Троян; 24 October 1921 – 7 September 2011) was a Soviet Russian intelligence officer who also served as a nurse in a partisan unit. She is most known for her role in the assassination of Wilhelm Kube, for which she and her fellow co-conspirators were honored with the title Hero of the Soviet Union on 29 October 1943.

== Early life ==
Nadezhda Viktorovna Troyan was born on 24 October 1921 to a working-class Russian family in the village of Drissa, located within the Vitebsk province of present-day Belarus. Her family frequently moved to different parts of the Soviet Union including Chechnya and Siberia. After completing ten grades of school with excellent marks she entered training at the Moscow Medical Institute, but transferred to the Minsk Medical Institute when her family moved to Minsk.

== World War II ==
After the German invasion of the Soviet Union in 1941 the German army quickly took control of Troyan's hometown and she was forced to clean the Wehrmacht's barracks. She was later reassigned to kitchen duty, and worked with several prisoners of war. She found an anti-occupation pamphlet in her backyard and spread out several copies, but after her family moved to Smalyavichy she became more involved in the resistance movement after learning that a fellow nurse at the hospital where she worked, Nyura Kosarevskaya, was helping a group of partisans.

Eventually, Troyan gained Kosarevskaya's trust and Troyan assisted the partisan unit by working as a translator since she knew quite a bit of German. She began producing leaflets written in German directed at Wehrmacht soldiers, then hid them in the bottom of containers of food sold to German troops, and she would smuggle weapons and supplies to the Minsk resistance whenever a German officer took her to Minsk. Later the Germans became more suspicious of her in the summer of 1942, so they forced her to watch a mass execution of alleged partisans. After that she managed to leave Smalyavichy and began working as a nurse in the "Dyadi Koli" partisan unit. She was then assigned to the 5th sub-detachment, which was supposed to derail trains, destroy German equipment, and help Soviet prisoners escape.

In Spring 1943 Troyan was assigned the dangerous task of finding someone to assassinate Wilhelm Kube, a high-ranking member of the SS and the General-Kommissar of Nazi-occupied Belarus. Troyan eventually settled on a young woman by the name of Yelena Mazanik, who worked in Kube's mansion as a maid and was the sister of another partisan, Valentina Shchutskoi. Mazanik was very afraid to trust Troyan at first but after Mazanik's sister verified the identity of the co-conspirator who would provide the bomb, Mariya Osipova, Mazanik was more at ease and agreed to the plan. Mazanik planted the bomb the assassination went as planned; afterward all three members of the plot including Troyan were awarded the title Hero of the Soviet Union on 29 October 1943. She continued participating in resistance activities until the end of the war.

== Later life ==
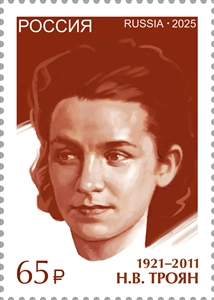
Troyan on a 2025 stamp of Russia

After the end of the war Troyan graduated in 1947 from medical school in Moscow and went on to become a surgeon. She became a Candidate of Medical Sciences in 1962 after writing her dissertation, after which she worked for the Ministry of Health at the Central Scientific Research Institute for Health Education of the USSR, and eventually became the program's director. Her son Aleksei became a cardiovascular surgeon. She died in Moscow on 7 September 2011 at the age of 89.

== See also ==
- List of female Heroes of the Soviet Union
- Soviet partisans
- Yelena Mazanik
- Mariya Osipova
