= Fyodor Trofimov =

Soviet soldier (1919–1993)

Fyodor Leontievich Trofimov
- Фёдор Леонтьевич Трофимов
- Born: 15 February 1919; Novosergeevka village, Tomsk Uyezd, Tomsk Governorate, Russian SFSR (now Kozhevnikovsky District, Tomsk Oblast, Russia)
- Died: 5 November 1993 (aged 74); Seversk, Tomsk Oblast, Russia
- Military career
- Allegiance: Soviet Union
- Branch: Red Army
- Service years: 1943–1945
- Rank: Senior Sergeant
- Unit: 681st Rifle Regiment
- Conflicts: World War II
- Awards: Hero of the Soviet Union; Distinguished Service Cross; Several others (see below)

Fyodor Leontievich Trofimov (Russian: Фёдор Леонтьевич Трофимов) (15 February 1919 - 5 November 1993) was a Soviet soldier who served during World War II and recipient of the title Hero of the Soviet Union.

== Early life ==
Trofimov was born into a peasant family of Russian ethnicity. He graduated from the 7th grade of a school in Tomsk and served a foreman at the Siberia matchstick factory from 1937 to 1939. From 1939, he studied at the Kemerovo Mining and Coal College and at the same time he worked in a mine. From 1942, he served as a fitter at the Pioneer mine in Kemerovo.

== World War II ==
In October 1943, he was drafted into the Red Army and from December 1943, he served as a scout of the 681st Rifle Regiment of the 133rd Rifle Division of 2nd Ukrainian Front.

Trofimov distinguished himself in offensive battles from the period from 8 March 1944 to 20 March 1944. On the night of 24 March, the soldiers of 681st Rifle Regiment began crossing the Dniester River. As Trofimov and a group of scouts crossed the river first near the village of Lipchany in Vinnytsia Oblast, a battle ensured with the German troops and scouts led by Trofimov. Despite the numerical superiority of the enemy troops, Trofimov fought using grenades and engaging in hand-to-hand combat, resulting him in killing 20 enemy troops. On March 28, as part of the scouts taking part in the battle for the village of Medveja in Moldavian SSR, Trofimov repelled eight enemy counterattacks for four hours and then went on to launch a counterattack with several grenades and broke through from the encirclement, managing to kill 80 German soldiers and officers. He participated in the Second Jassy–Kishinev offensive and in May 1944, while performing a combat mission near the Siret River, he was seriously wounded.

By decree of the Presidium of the Supreme Soviet of the USSR of 13 September 1944, "for the exemplary performance of command assignments on the front of the struggle against the Nazi invaders and the courage and heroism shown at the same time", Trofimov was awarded the title of Hero of the Soviet Union with the award of the Order of Lenin.

In the autumn of 1944, he was the commander of a section of the 129th Communications Line Battalion. In 1945, as a reconnaissance officer, Trofimov led out of the encirclement a group of American paratroopers in Czechoslovakia, for which he was awarded the Distinguished Service Cross by the U.S. Army.

He ended the war at the Czechoslovak city of Brno. He was wounded five times and three of his brothers were killed in action during the war.

== Later life ==
After World War II, Trofimov took in operations against the Organization of Ukrainian Nationalists (Banderites) in Western Ukraine.

He studied at the Moscow Mechanical Institute of the People's Commissariat of Ammunition and Kirov Tomsk Polytechnic Institute from 1945 to 1946, but was unable to complete his studies due to the consequences of his war injuries. In 1949, he completed his studies and graduated from Tomsk Polytechnic University. On the same year, he worked at the construction of the Siberian Chemical Combine, which manufactured highly enriched uranium-235 and plutonium and later served as the head of the technical supply of the Khimstroy plant in Tomsk. He became a member of the Communist Party of the Soviet Union on 1966. Trofimov retired in April 1979 and resided in the city of Seversk.

Trofimov died on 5 November 1993, at the age of 74. He was buried at the Walk of Fame section of the city cemetery in Seversk.

== Personal life ==
Trofimov was married to Nina Kuzminichna Trofimova. The couple had two sons: Vyacheslav (born 1947) and Vladimir (born 1954).

== Awards and honors ==
Hero of the Soviet Union (13 September 1944)
Order of Lenin (13 September 1944)
Order of the Red Banner (19 February 1944)
Order of the Patriotic War, 1st class (11 March 1985)
Order of the Patriotic War, 2nd class (21 February 1944)
Order of the Red Star (6 March 1944)
Medal "For Courage"
Medal "For the Victory over Germany in the Great Patriotic War 1941–1945" (1945)
Distinguished Service Cross (United States)

- jubilee medals
- Honorary Citizen of Seversk
- A memorial plaque honoring Trofimov was installed on house number 2 on Lenin Street in Seversk, where he had resided.
