= Georgy Zakharov (air force general) =

Georgi Nefiodovich Zakharov
- Георгий Нефёдович Захаров
- Born: 24 April 1908; Samara Oblast, Russian Empire
- Died: 6 January 1996 (aged 87); Moscow, Russia
- Burial place: Kuntsevo Cemetery
- Military career
- Allegiance: Soviet Union
- Branch: Red Air Force
- Service years: 1930–1960
- Rank: Major General
- Conflicts: Spanish Civil War; Second Sino-Japanese War; World War II
- Awards: Hero of the Soviet Union; Knight of the Legion of Honor; Order of Alexander Nevsky

Georgi Nefiodovich Zakharov (Russian: Георгий Нефёдович Захаров; 24 April 1908 – 6 January 1996) was a Soviet Air Force general.

== Biography ==
=== Early life ===
Born to a peasant family, Zakharov graduated from an agricultural institute and went to work in a Sovkhoz, joining the Communist Party in 1929. In 1930 he joined the Red Army, completing pilot training in the 7th Military Flight School at Stalingrad during 1933. Afterwards, he served in the North Caucasus Military District and in the 36th Aviation Brigade of the Kiev Military District.

=== Interwar years ===
In late 1936, Zakharov volunteered to assist the Spanish Republic in the Spanish Civil War. He arrived in Cartagena on 20 October 1936, under the alias 'Enrique Lores'. He was soon dispatched to Madrid, that was besieged by the Nationalists. At an air battle on 4 November, while flying an I-15, he shot down two enemy Fiat CR.32's. On 9 November, he intercepted an IMAM Ro.37. On 8 December 1936, he shot down a civilian plane on board of which was the French journalist Louis Delaprée, who was fatally wounded in the incident. By the end of 1937, Zakharov was recalled to the Soviet Union. Overall, he claimed six solo and four group kills during his tour in Spain. For his accomplishments, he was awarded the Order of the Red Banner and promoted to captain. After his return, he first served as a test pilot and later as the commander of the 109th Interceptor Flight.

In April 1938, he was assigned to command a detachment of the Soviet Volunteer Group in China, based in Hankou, which was supporting the National Revolutionary Army in the Second Sino-Japanese War. During his service with the Group, which ended in November, he shot down three Japanese Mitsubishi A5M's. While flying a captured Mitsubishi to a Soviet airfield, he crashed in a remote region, but rescued later.

=== World War II ===
During 1939, Zakharov graduated from a course in the General Staff Academy and was promoted to Colonel. He was posted as the commander of the Siberian Military District's air component. On 7 May 1940, he was granted the rank of Major General. On November, he left Siberia to command the 43rd Interceptor Division, that was stationed in Minsk, at the Western Special Military District.

On 18 June 1941, Zakharov flew a Polikarpov Po-2 in a special reconnaissance mission over the German lines in the other side of the border. He spotted what he referred to as "an unprecedented German build-up." In an interview, former GRU Colonel Vladimir Kvachkov claimed that Zakharov's report reached the Kremlin and prompted Joseph Stalin to order a full alert on the front, but Marshal Dmitry Pavlov failed to carry out the directive.

On 22 June, when Operation Barbarossa was commenced, Zakharov - flying a Polikarpov I-16 - shot down two Ju 88 over Minsk. In November, he was relieved from his position in the 43rd Brigade and sent to the rear, to head the Trans-Baikal Military Flight School in Ulan-Ude, at Central Asia.

In December 1942 he returned to front duty, and was given command of the 303th Interceptor Division, which was forming in the Kubinka. He served in that capacity until the end of the war. In April 1943, the 303rd Division was reinforced by the Free French Normandie-Niemen Squadron.

Zakharov's unit participated in the Battle of Kursk and provided air support for the 3rd Belorussian Front during the Battle of Smolensk and the campaign in Belarus. They later took part in the fighting in Eastern Prussia.

=== Post-war career ===
During the Great Patriotic War, Zakhrov had personally flown 153 sorties, participated in 48 air battles and shot down ten enemy aircraft. For his "outstanding command and personal bravery", Major General of the Aviation Zakharov was awarded the title Hero of the Soviet Union and the Order of Lenin. He was later also awarded the Legion d'honneur (Chevalier) and made an honorary citizen of Paris.

After the war, Zakharov served in the Far Eastern Military District and in the military aircraft industry. He retired from active service in 1960.

== Awards and decorations ==
Soviet Union and Russia

Hero of the Soviet Union (19 April 1945)
Order of Zhukov (25 April 1995)
Order of Lenin, thrice (19 April 1945, 5 November 1954, 29 August 1955)
Order of the Red Banner, three times (2 January 1937, 17 July 1937, 14 November 1938, 19 November 1951)
Order of Kutuzov, 2nd class (3 July 1934)
Order of Alexander Nevsky (31 August 1943)
Order of the Patriotic War, 1st class (11 March 1985)
Order of the Red Star, twice (6 November 1945, 22 February 1955)
Medal "For Battle Merit" (3 November 1944)
Medal "For the Capture of Königsberg" (9 June 1945)
Medal "For the Capture of Berlin" (9 June 1945)
Medal "For the Victory over Germany in the Great Patriotic War 1941–1945" (9 May 1945)

- jubilee medals

Foreign

Legion of Honour, Officer (France)
Croix de Guerre, with Palm (France)
