= Ivan Taranenko =

Soviet fighter pilot and general

Ivan Andreevich Taranenko
- Иван Андреевич Тараненко
- Born: 28 April 1912; Gubinikha, Yekaterinoslav Governorate, Russian Empire
- Died: 4 March 1995 (aged 82); Moscow, Russian Federation
- Spouse: Serafima Amosova
- Military career
- Allegiance: Soviet Union
- Branch: Soviet Air Force
- Service years: 1933–1972
- Rank: General-lieutenant of aviation
- Conflicts: World War II; Winter War; Eastern Front
- Awards: Hero of the Soviet Union

Ivan Andreevich Taranenko (Russian: Иван Андреевич Тараненко; 28 April 1912 – 4 March 1995) was a Soviet fighter pilot, flying ace, and regimental commander in World War II who went on to become a general.

== Early life ==
Taranenko was born on 28 April 1912 to a Ukrainian peasant family in Gubinkha. After completing his seventh grade of school he worked as a carpenter at a factory in Dnepropetrovsk and later as secretary of the Komsomol committee of a plant in Pavlograd before entering the military in August 1933. Upon graduating from the Kharkov Military Aviation School of Pilots in 1934 he worked as an instructor and flight commander at the school. During the 1939-1940 war with Finland he flew 22 sorties on the I-153 as a squadron commissar in the 149th Fighter Aviation Regiment, but gained no confirmed aerial victories.

== World War II ==
Immediately after the start of Operation Barbarossa in June 1941, Taranenko entered combat, initially as a senior political instructor in the 12th Fighter Aviation Regiment. Wounded on 26 July 1941, he was transferred to the 298th Fighter Aviation Regiment when he recovered, of which he soon became the commander of. By mid November that year he totaled 85 sorties and was credited with shooting down an Ju 88 bomber, although later analysis by has led historians to believe he did not successfully shoot down any enemy aircraft until 1943. From May 1942 to February 1943 his regiment left active combat to retrain to fly the P-39. The next month he gained his first aerial victory, shooting down an S-52 Northwest of Taman on 13 March 1943. In June 1943 he was nominated to for the title Hero of the Soviet Union, having been credited with four solo and four shared shootdowns at the time; by then his regiment surpassed 100 enemy aircraft shot down, seeing heavy combat in the intense aerial battles over Kuban. On 27 July 1943 he was promoted to commander of the 294th Fighter Aviation Division, and on 2 September be was awarded the title Hero of the Soviet Union. In 1944 his division was honored with the guards designation and renamed to the 13th Guards Fighter Aviation Division. Despite his high position, he continued to fly in combat, going on be credited with shooting down two FW 190 in 1945 while piloting a Yak-3. By the end of the war Taranenko was credited with accumulating 253 sorties, engaging in 54 aerial battles and gaining either six solo and seven shared or four solo and three shared shootdowns.

== Postwar and personal life ==
Taranenko stayed in the Air Force after the end of the war, and in 1946 he graduated from officer training at the Air Force Academy in Monino. He went on to hold a variety of high posts in the military, graduating from Military Academy of General Staff in 1955 and holding a variety of high posts before retiring from the air force with the rank of general-lieutenant in 1972. He then worked as an engineer at the Ilyushin Design Bureau from 1973 to 1982.

Shortly after the end of the war he married Serafima Amosova, an officer from the all-female 46th Guards Night Bomber Aviation Regiment. He died on 4 March 1995 and his remains were placed in the Novodevichy cemetery.

== Awards ==
- Hero of the Soviet Union (2 September 1943)
- Two Order of Lenin (2 September 1943 and 31 October 1967)
- Five Order of the Red Banner (4 March 1940, 12 February 1942, 23 July 1943, 24 September 1944, and 3 November 1953)
- Order of Bogdan Khmelnitsky 2nd class (28 April 1945)
- Two Order of the Patriotic War 2nd class (2 May 1943 and 11 March 1985)
- Order of the Red Star (20 June 1949)
- Medal "For Battle Merit" (3 November 1944)
- campaign and jubilee medals
