= Curt von Gottberg =

German Nazi official, SS-Obergruppenführer

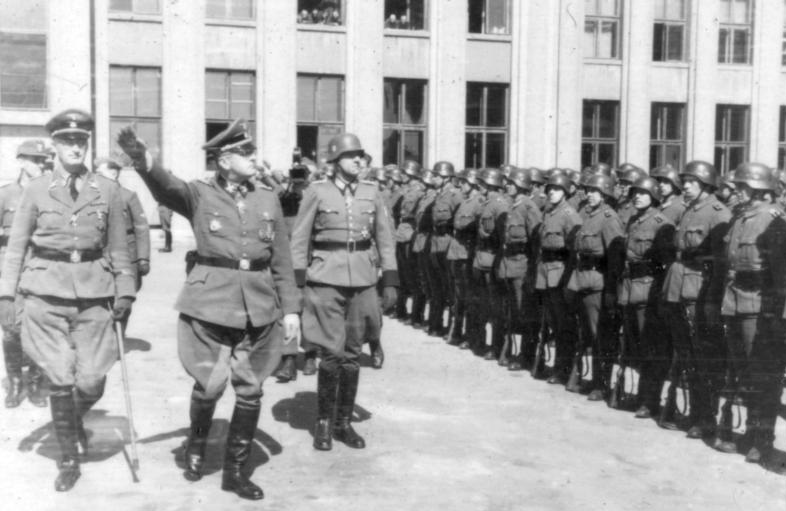
- Curt von Gottberg (left) and Erich von dem Bach-Zelewski In Minsk, 1943.
- Born: 11 February 1896; Preussisch Wilten (now Pravdinsky District), East Prussia, German Empire
- Died: 31 May 1945 (aged 49); Flensburg, Allied-occupied Germany
- Military career
- Allegiance: German Empire
- Service years: 1914–1918
- Unit: Prussian Army
- Awards: Iron Cross 2nd and 1st Class
- Freikorps and SS career
- Allegiance: Weimar Republic; Nazi Germany
- Branch: Waffen-SS
- Service years: 1919–1920; 1933–1945
- Rank: SS-Obergruppenführer and General of the Waffen-SS and Police
- Service number: NSDAP #948,753; SS #45,923
- Unit: Marinebrigade Ehrhardt
- Commands: Higher SS and Police Leader (HSSPF) "Russland Mitte und Weissruthenien"; Kampfgruppe von Gottberg; XII SS Corps
- Awards: Knight's Cross of the Iron Cross; German Cross in Gold

Curt Gustav Friedrich Walther von Gottberg (11 February 1896 – 31 May 1945) was a high-ranking SS-Obergruppenführer who served as Higher SS and Police Leader for central Russia and, from September 1943, as the Generalkommissar (Commissioner-General) of occupied Belarus, combining the highest civil and police powers in that jurisdiction during the Second World War.

Gottberg personally ordered many war crimes and commanded units that committed atrocities against the civilian population of occupied territories. After the end of the war, he was arrested and committed suicide while in custody.

== Early life ==
Gottberg was born in East Prussia, to an old Farther Pomeranian aristocratic family. After a training in agricultural management, from 1912, he fought in World War I, serving from 2 August 1914. He served through nearly the entire war, receiving numerous bullet and shell wounds, and was decorated with the Iron Cross 1st and 2nd Class. Along with other demobilised officers, he then joined the Marinebrigade Ehrhardt (a Freikorps). Gottberg returned to East Prussia in 1924, finished his agricultural training and until the end of the 1920s managed personal estates near Königsberg.

== Early SS career ==
Following a common route for former Freikorps members, Gottberg joined the SA in 1931, and the Nazi Party in February 1932. In September 1932 he joined the Schutzstaffel (SS). By the end of 1933, as an SS-Sturmbannführer, he was head of the 3rd battalion of the SS-Verfügungstruppe regiment 1 in Ellwangen: the desire to construct a military force (the basis for the Waffen-SS) compelled the SS leadership to rely on trained military personnel from World War I.

In 1936, Gottberg assumed leadership of the 49th SS-Standarte in Brunswick. In January 1936 Gottberg was involved in a car accident, and his left leg was amputated below the knee. Heinrich Himmler personally intervened on his behalf: the cost of medical care and of the damaged car (which was not Gottberg's) was covered. Himmler also intervened so that Gottberg was promoted to head of the Office for Settlement into the Race and Settlement (RuSHA) in July 1937. However, Gottberg became overwhelmed by his duties; by summer 1939 he was also the acting Commissar of Land Management for Prague. Gottberg's financial mismanagement in these roles (dubious transactions, "donations", loans to private individuals, lack of supervision of subordinates, losses running into the millions) led to a scandal within the SS administration. In November 1939 his superior at RuSHA, Günther Pancke, called for Gottberg's resignation, even threatening him with dispatch to a concentration camp.

His suspension and 'house arrest' lasted until November 1940, after interventions on his behalf. The long-delayed disciplinary proceedings at an internal SS court took place in April 1942, ending with Gottberg's rehabilitation. It was decided that "factual errors" had led him to make "inappropriate" decisions, but that he had also conducted himself with "remarkable" persistence, intelligence and "personal devotion".

== Later SS career and war crimes ==
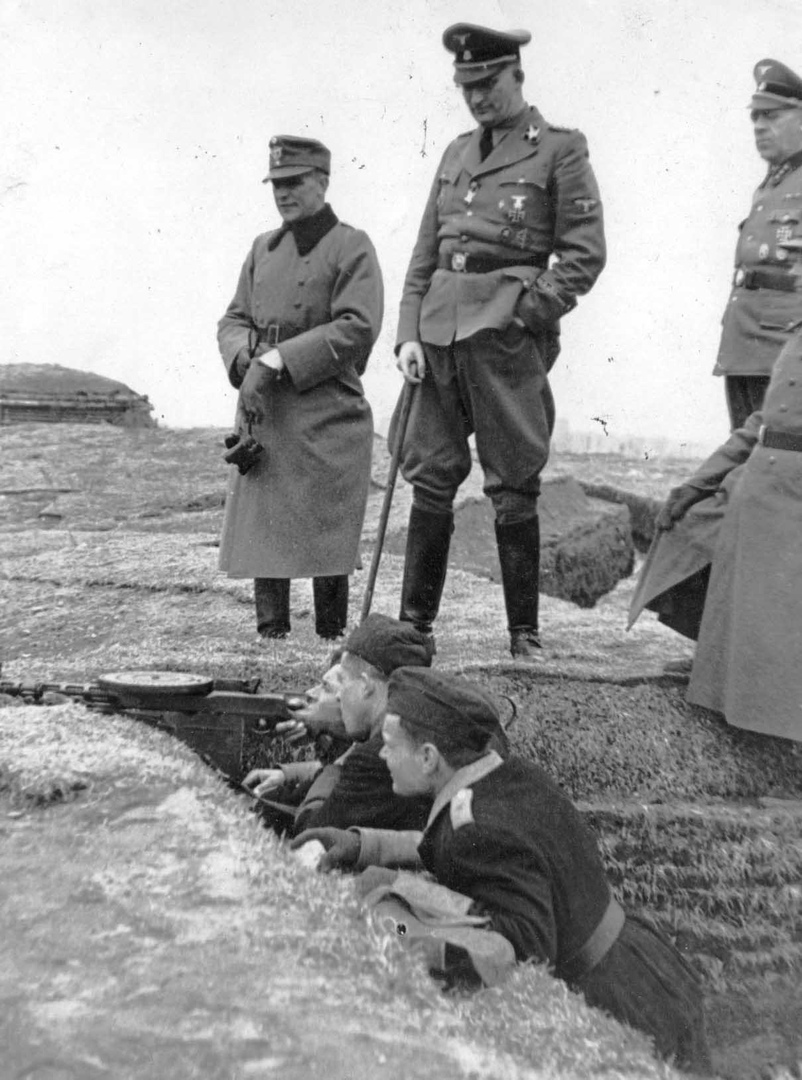
Curt von Gottberg (with walking stick) and collaborators from the Belarusian Home Defence (1944)

Gottberg was appointed SS and Police Leader "Weissruthenien", encompassing Belarus, effective 21 July 1942, and served in that capacity until 22 September 1943 when he was made Generalkommissar for Generalbezirk Weissruthenien after Wilhelm Kube was assassinated by a bomb in Minsk. In addition, on 5 July 1943, he was appointed standing Deputy and Acting Higher SS and Police Leader (HSSPF) for "Russland-Mitte und Weissruthenien," when the incumbent, Erich von dem Bach-Zelewski, was detailed to lead anti-partisan activities.

Gottberg developed a new 'strategy' in the fight against partisans on the occupied territory of the Soviet Union, mounting aggressive operations against suspected 'partisan bases' (generally ordinary villages; Gottberg's strategy seems to have largely involved terrorising the civilian population). Whole regions were classified as "bandit territory" (German: Bandengebiet): residents were expelled or murdered and dwellings destroyed. "In the evacuated areas," said Gottberg in an order, "all people are in future fair game". An order of Gottberg's of 7 December 1942 stated: "Each bandit, Jew, gypsy, is to be regarded as an enemy". After his first operation, Nürnberg, Gottberg reported on 5 December 1942: "Enemy dead: 799 bandits, over 300 suspected bandits and over 1800 Jews [...] Our losses: 2 dead and 10 wounded. One must have luck".

As a result, Kampfgruppe von Gottberg, along with the SS-Sonderbataillon Dirlewanger and Kaminski Brigades, under the coordination of Bach-Zelewski, were responsible for the organised mass murder of countless civilians in Belarus. On 21 June 1944, a few days before the collapse of the front, was made permanent HSSPF for Central Russia in succession to Bach-Zelewski and, on 30 June, he was promoted to the rank of SS-Obergruppenführer and General of the Waffen-SS and the Police. He was also awarded the Knight's Cross of the Iron Cross.

The defeat of Army Group Centre saw Kampfgruppe von Gottberg thrown into front-line service against the Red Army's Minsk, Vilnius and Belostock Offensive Operations, all part of the strategic offensive Operation Bagration. His forces were tasked with helping to defend Minsk and subsequently Lida, though in both cases they withdrew (contrary to Wehrmacht orders) when faced with Soviet attack.

From August to October 1944, Gottberg commanded XII SS Corps. In September 1944, he was appointed the head of all anti-partisan activity in occupied France but, because of the rapid German retreat, he never actually assumed this post. From December to the end of the war, Gottberg served as Himmler's Deputy Commander of the Replacement Army. In March 1945, Himmler put Gottberg in charge of screening the railroad system for soldiers who were traveling away from fighting fronts. Joseph Goebbels also directed Gottberg that spring as desperate efforts were made to send men who had been released from the Wehrmacht back to combat.

== Arrest and suicide ==
Gottberg was arrested by the Allies after the war's end. He committed suicide on 31 May 1945 while in British captivity in Flensburg.

== Awards and decorations ==
- German Cross in Gold on 7 August 1943 as SS-Brigadeführer and Generalmajor of the Police, commander of a Kampfgruppe, and SS and SS and Police Leader "Weißruthenien"
- Knight's Cross of the Iron Cross on 30 June 1944 as SS-Gruppenführer and Generalleutnant of the Police and leader of Kampfgruppe von Gottberg
