= Boris Turzhansky =

Boris Aleksandrovich Turzhansky
- Native name: Борис Александрович Туржанский
- Born: 9 March [O.S. 25 February] 1900; Smolensk, Russian Empire
- Died: 14 June 1948 (aged 48); Moscow, USSR
- Allegiance: Soviet Union
- Service / branch: Soviet Air Force
- Rank: Colonel
- Battles / wars: Russian Civil War; Spanish Civil War; World War II
- Awards: Hero of Soviet Union

Boris Aleksandrovich Turzhansky (Russian: Борис Александрович Туржанский; 9 March [O.S. 25 February] 1900 – 14 June 1948) was a Soviet pilot and the first person awarded the title of Hero of the Soviet Union for actions in combat. His brother, Aleksandr Turzhansky, was one of founders of Soviet attack aviation.

== Early life ==
Turzhansky was born in Smolensk on 9 March [O.S. 25 February] 1900 in a family of a clerk. After completing his third year of secondary school in 1913 he became a student of the Smolensk gymnasium, and in 1915 he moved to Moscow; there he attended the Moscow Art School and became an artist.

== Military career ==
=== Russian Civil War ===
Shortly after the outbreak of the Russian Civil War, Tuzhansky entered the Red Army in 1918. Initially he worked as a telephone operator for the 7th Fighter Aviation Detachment, but in 1920 he began working for the political department of the 9th Army.

=== Aviation career ===
In 1921 Turzhansky graduated from Yegoryevsk Military Theoretical Aviation School and Zaraysk Flight School of Preliminary Training. In the following year he graduated from Kacha Military Aviation School of Pilots, and in 1923 he graduated from Moscow Higher Aviation School and Serpukhov Aviation School of Aerial Gunnery and Bombardment. From then until 1924 he was a flight instructor at the Kacha Military Aviation School of Pilots, after which he was sent to a combat unit in the Kiev Military District. From 1925 to 1927 he returned to being a flight instructor, taking his work to the Zhukovsky Air Force Academy.

His Air Force service continued from 1927 in a combat unit in Kiev Military District as assistant chief of staff of aviation brigade and detachment commander. In 1929 he graduated from courses of improvement of command personnel at Zhukovsky Air Force Academy. In 1932-1933 he commanded 7th Dzerzhinsky Fighter Squadron. From 1934 to 1936 Turzhansky commanded an aviation brigade in Baku, protecting the local oil wells. He trained his pilots for night flights. He was elected into the government of Transcaucasian Socialist Federative Soviet Republic. For his excellent work he was awarded a Harvey bike.

In 1936 Boris Turzhansky started his education at operative department of Zhukovsky Air Force Academy.

=== Spanish Civil War ===
From 22 October 1936 to 11 February 1937 Turzhansky participated in the Spanish Civil War as the commander of Polikarpov I-15 aviation group. on the Northern Front. He was wounded and lost one eye as the consequence. He was awarded the title of Hero of Soviet Union (medal No.12).

=== Peacetime ===
In 1937 he became an inspector pilot of the Air Force Department of the Red Army. Since 1937 till 1939 he worked as test pilot at Aviation Factory No.1 in Moscow. He tested there such aircraft as Polikarpov I-15bis and Polikarpov I-153. In 1939 he was promoted to head of flight-testing station of Aviation Factory No.1 and worked at testing of Polikarpov I-153, Mikoyan-Gurevich MiG-1 and Mikoyan-Gurevich MiG-3.

=== World War II ===
During July 1941 he was in 1st Independent Fighter Aviation Squadron of PVO (anti-aircraft defence) of Moscow and was on night combat duties at Moscow central airport.

From July to December 1941 he took position of head of flight-testing station of Aviation Factory No.301 in Khimki, where he tested Yakovlev Yak-1 and Yakovlev Yak-7. From the end of 1941 to 1943 he moved to flight-testing station of Aviation Factory No.153 in Novosibirsk, where he tested Yakovlev Yak-7 and Yakovlev Yak-9. Since 1943 he worked as the head of flight-testing station of Aviation Factory No.82 (Tushino) with Yakovlev Yak-7 and Yakovlev Yak-9. In 1945 he was made a test pilot, 1st class.

He died of a serious illness on 14 June 1948 in Moscow and was buried in the Moscow Armenian Cemetery.

== Combat feat ==
Squadron under Turzhansky's command in active aerial combat over Spain shot down 6 enemy airplanes (Boris Turzhansky personally downed 3 airplanes). At December 20, 1936, during an emergency landing after a battle he was heavily wounded (the airplane nosed in mountainous terrain), lost his eye as the result of difficult cranial operation and was sent home.

For his valor and heroism, shown while carrying out his military and international duty, kombrig Boris Aleksandrovich Turzhansky was 31 December 1936, awarded the title of Hero of Soviet Union. He became the first Hero of Soviet Union to be awarded with this title for military deeds. After the establishment of the gold star medal for recipients of the title he was given the medal on 4 November 1939.

== Memorials ==
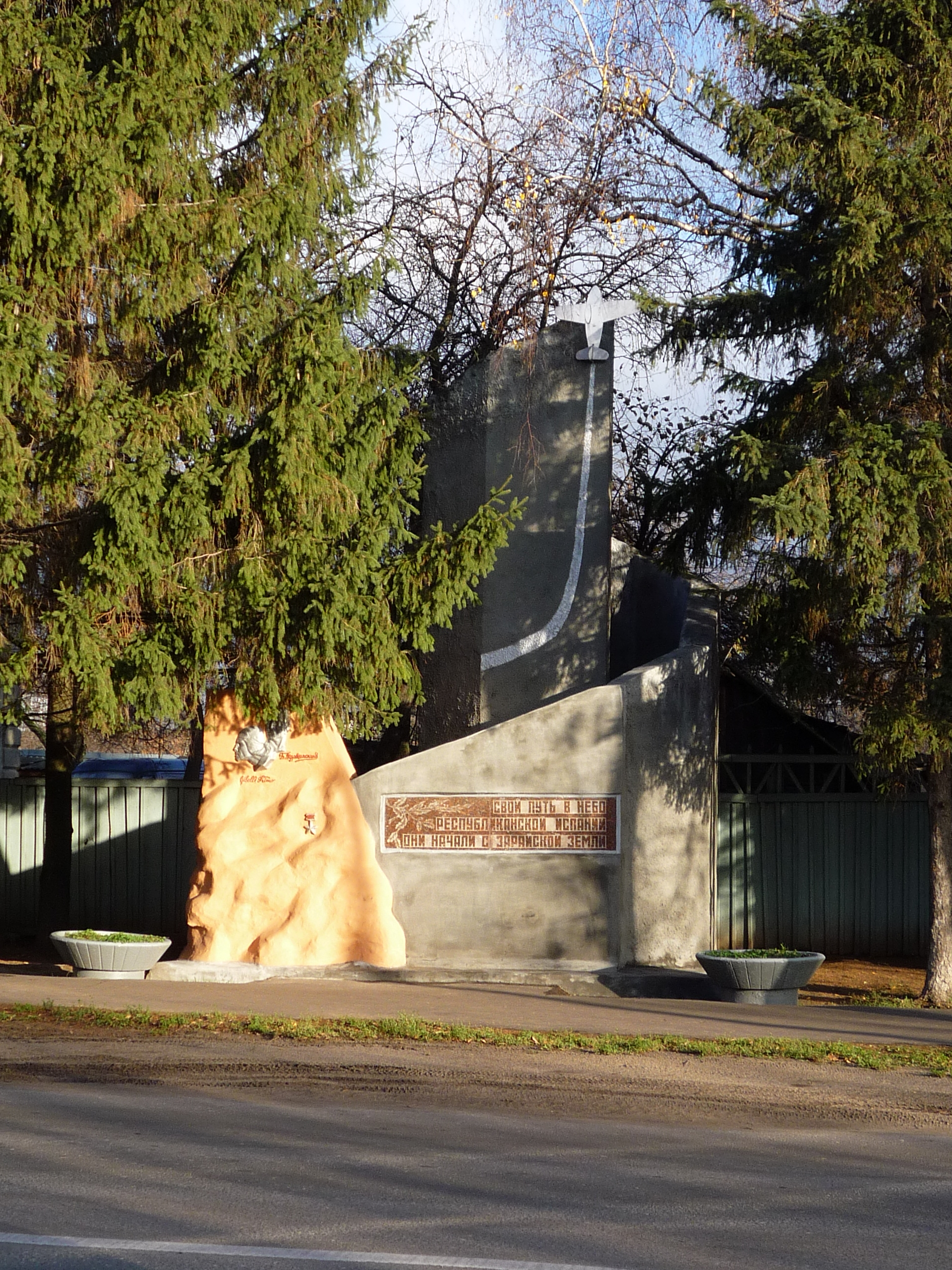
A memorial to Turzhansky in Zaraysk

- A monument and a memorial plaque after Turzhansky are put in Zaraysk.
- A supersonic missile carrier was named after Turzhansky in March 1971.

== Awards ==
- Hero of Soviet Union (31 December 1936)
- Two Orders of Lenin (31 December 1936 and 21 February 1945)
- Two Orders of the Red Banner (3 November 1944 and 1948)
- Order of the Patriotic War 1st class (19 August 1944)
- Order of the Red Star (2 July 1945)
- campaign medals.
