= Usievalad Rodzka =

Belarusian Axis collaborator

- Усевалад Родзька

Mayor of Vitebsk
- In office 3 July 1941 – 27 June 1944

Personal details
- Born: 21 June 1920 Near Malyja Čučavičy, Civil Administration of the Eastern Lands, Second Polish Republic (now Belarus)
- Died: 1946 (aged 26) Minsk, Byelorussian SSR, Soviet Union (now Belarus)
- Party: Belarusian Independence Party

Military service
- Allegiance: Second Polish Republic; Nazi Germany
- Branch/service: Polish Land Forces; Heer
- Years of service: 1939; 1941; 1944–1945
- Commands: Byelorussian Home Defence; Dahlwitz Landing Battalion
- Battles/wars: World War II; Invasion of Poland; Eastern Front

Usievalad Filaretavič Rodzka (Belarusian: Усе́валад Філарэ́тавіч Родзька, Russian: Все́волод Филаре́тович Ро́дзько; 21 July 1920 – 1946) was a Belarusian collaborator with Nazi Germany during World War II. He served as commander of the Dahlwitz Byelorussian Landing Battalion, was burgomaster of Vitebsk from 3 July 1941 until its recapture by the Red Army on 27 June 1944, and served as Chairman of the Central Committee of the Belarusian Independence Party.

== Early life and career ==
Usievalad Filaretavič Rodzka was born on 21 July 1920 in rural Brześć District. His father, Filaret Rodzka, was a local teacher. His sister, Halina Rusak, would later become a painter.

Rodzka attended gymnasium in Novogrudok. Originally attending a Belarusian gymnasium, after the institution's closing in 1934 the Belarusian students were moved to the Adam Mickiewicz Polish Gymnasium, a Polish-language gymnasium in the same city. While studying at the Mickiewicz Gymnasium, Rodzka was friends with Jazep Sažyč and Barys Rahulia, together forming an anti-socialist social circle. The social circle was supportive of Vasil Rahulia, a local Belarusian nationalist and agrarian politician who had been imprisoned by the Polish government. In 1938, following his graduation, Rodzka joined the Polish Land Forces, studying at the artillery school in Zambrów.

== World War II ==
Immediately following the invasion of Poland, Rodzka was conscripted into the Polish Land Forces as a member of the 42nd Infantry Regiment. On 19 September 1939, he was wounded and captured by the Germans, and was sent to a prisoner of war camp in Poznań. On 20 August 1940, however, he was released and allowed to participate in Belarusian nationalist activities, in preparation for Operation Barbarossa.

Following his release, Rodzka commonly travelled between Warsaw and Kraków, where he made contacts with Vincent Hadleŭski and the Organization of Ukrainian Nationalists, respectively. Alongside Hadleŭski, Rodzka allegedly helped to create the Belarusian Independence Party in 1940 in German-occupied Poland, though other accounts have disputed the time and date of this.

=== Political activities ===
Following the beginning of the German occupation of Byelorussia, Rodzka was appointed as burgomaster (mayor) of Vitebsk on 3 July 1941. Together with Hadleŭski, Rodzka was recruited by the Abwehr and tasked with spreading anti-Soviet propaganda in occupied Belarus. As mayor of Vitebsk, Rodzka was tasked with the Derussification of the city and the promotion of Belarusian culture. He maintained close personal contacts with Taras Bulba-Borovets and Stepan Bandera, both Ukrainian nationalist leaders.

In 1942, following Hadleŭski's execution, Rodzka became head of the Belarusian Independence Party's central committee. He began working with Mikola Abramchyk, head of the Belarusian People's Republic in exile, in 1943 developing a plan to flee to Berlin and continue agitation for Belarusian independence there. However, Abramchyk's plans were interrupted by German authorities, who forced him to return to Paris.

As leader of the Belarusian Independence Party, Rodzka appointed cadres of various chapters, corresponding with the territory of the Belarusian People's Republic. Among other appointments, Michał Vituška was selected as chief of the Smolensk chapter of the party, while his ally Dzmitryj Kasmovič was appointed as chief of the party's Bryansk chapter. The public was ideologically indoctrinated in anti-communist activism, including preparing youths for military service.

It has been claimed that Rodzka formulated plans to revolt against Germany, following the example of Bandera's 1941 declaration of independence and the subsequent creation of the Ukrainian Insurgent Army. However, such plans never came to fruition, and it has been postulated by historian Siarhiej Jorš that Vituška, instead, formulated such plans. Following Operation Bagration, existing plans for a revolt in 1944 were cancelled, with the Soviet Union being viewed as a more significant threat than Nazi Germany, and cooperation was strengthened between the Belarusian Independence Party and the Abwehr.

In 1944, Rodzka was appointed to the Belarusian Central Council, and became a member of the Central Council's presidium. As part of the presidium, Rodzka worked closely with fellow Belarusian Independence Party member and personal friend Mikalaj Škialionak, with Rodzka being placed in charge of youth affairs and Škialionak propaganda activities.

=== Military activities ===
In August 1941, Rodzka, along with Jakub Chareǔski and Michał Vituška, led Belarusian collaborationist troops in combat against Belarusian partisans in the Polesia region. In 1944, Rodzka expressed his belief that Belarusian military units needed to be established and modernised, referencing the interwar Polish army as a source of inspiration for organising Belarusian nationalist forces. That year, the Byelorussian Home Defence was organised as a vehicle to mobilise Belarusian nationalists against the advancing Red Army. Rodzka was on 20 March 1944 placed as a lieutenant in charge of propaganda. However, unsatisfied with this role, Rodzka soon moved to participate directly in combat, and participated in the destructive Operation Frühlingsfest against Belarusian partisans.

Following the capture of Vitebsk, Belarusian nationalist soldiers and politicians, Rodzka among them, began to retreat west. In the village of Dahlwitz, in East Prussia (now Listovoye, Kaliningrad Oblast, Russia), Rodzka underwent Abwehr training in sabotage, and was appointed as political commissar of the Dahlwitz Landing Battalion. Rodzka felt a calling to be political and military leader of the anti-Soviet forces remaining in Belarus, and established contacts with the forest brothers in the Baltic States, as well as Bulba-Borovets and Bandera. Rodzka also spoke unsuccessfully in favour of an alliance between the Central Council and the Russian Liberation Army of Andrey Vlasov, being the only member of the Central Council to support such a measure.

== Defeat and death ==
By May 1945, the Dahlwitz Battalion had been completely destroyed. Rodzka subsequently fled to Białystok, where, according to various accounts, he either lived under an assumed name or was involved with a Polish woman through whom he intended to flee westwards. However, he was soon discovered, arrested, and sent to Minsk, where he was put on trial. Rodzka, along with the rest of the Belarusian Independence Party, was sentenced to death and executed in 1946.
