= Byelorussia in World War II =

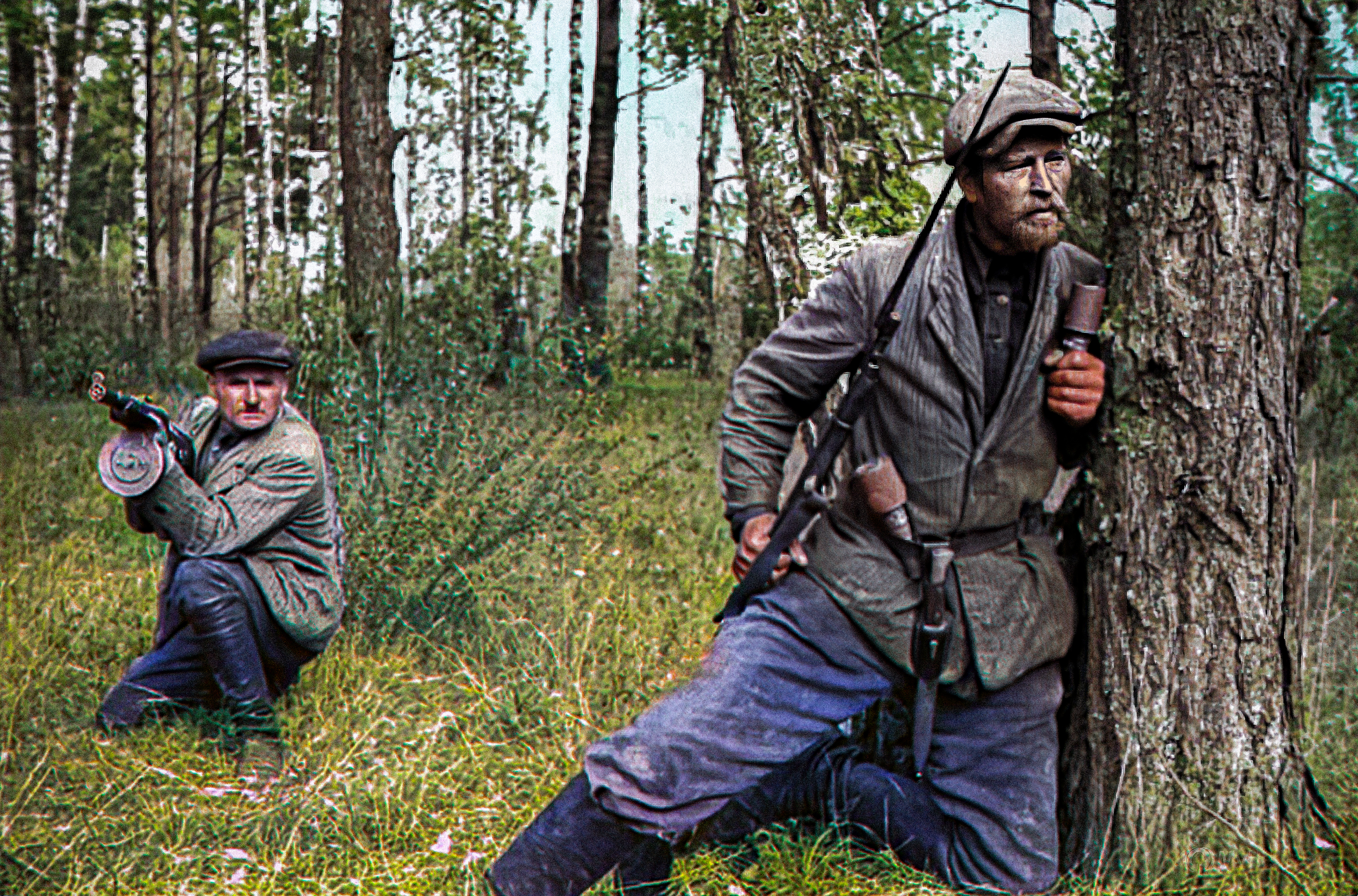
Soviet partisans in Belarus in 1943.

When the Second World War in Europe began, the territory which now forms the country of Belarus was divided between the Soviet Union (specifically the Byelorussian Soviet Socialist Republic) and the Second Polish Republic. The borders of Soviet Belarus were greatly expanded in the Soviet invasion of Poland of 1939. In 1941, the country was occupied by Nazi Germany. Following the German military disasters at Stalingrad and Kursk, the collaborationist Belarusian Central Council (BCC) was formed by the Germans in order to raise local support for their anti-Soviet operations. The BCC in turn formed the twenty-thousand strong Belarusian Home Defence (BKA), active from 23 February 1944 to 28 April 1945. Assistance to collaborators was offered by the local Soviet administrative governments, and prewar public organizations including the former Soviet Belarusian Youth. The country was soon retaken by the Red Army in 1944. Devastated by the war, Belarus lost significant populations and economic resources. Many battles occurred in Belarusian territory. Belarusians also participated in the advance towards Berlin.

== September 1939 – June 1941 ==
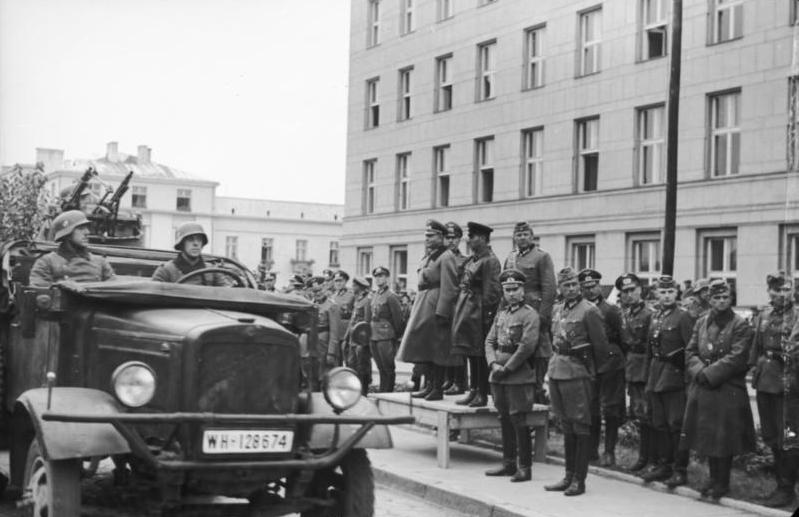
German–Soviet military parade in Brest-Litovsk. Troops passing the platform with the officers. September 22, 1939

The Molotov–Ribbentrop Non-Aggression Pact of August 1939 had established a non-aggression agreement between Nazi Germany and the Soviet Union, and a secret protocol described how Finland, Estonia, Latvia, Lithuania, Poland (Second Polish Republic) and Romania would be divided between them.

In the Invasion of Poland of 1939 the two powers invaded and partitioned Poland, and to return the Ukrainian, Belarusian, and Moldavian territories in the North and North-Eastern regions of Romania (Northern Bucovina and Bessarabia).

The Polish defense was already broken, with their only hope being retreat and reorganisation in the south-eastern region (the Romanian Bridgehead), when on 17 September 1939, it was rendered obsolete overnight. The 800,000 strong Soviet Union Red Army, divided into the Belarusian and Ukrainian fronts, invaded the eastern regions of Poland that had not yet been involved in military operations, in violation of the Soviet-Polish Non-Aggression Pact. Soviet diplomacy were protecting the Ukrainian and Belarusian minorities inhabiting Poland in view of Polish imminent collapse.

Polish border defence forces (Korpus Ochrony Pogranicza) in the east (about 25 battalions) were unable to defend the border, and Edward Rydz-Śmigły further ordered them to fall back and not engage the Soviets. This, however, did not prevent some clashes and small battles, like the defence of Grodno was defended by soldiers and local population. The Soviets murdered a number of Poles, including prisoners-of-war like General Józef Olszyna-Wilczyński. Ukrainians rose against the Poles, and communist partisans organised local revolts, e.g. in Skidel, robbing and murdering Poles. Those movements were quickly disciplined by the NKVD.

Prior to the Soviet partisans support from the East, the Polish military's fall-back plan had called for long-term defence against Germany in the southern-eastern part of Poland (near the Romanian border), while awaiting relief from a Western Allies attack on Germany's western border. However, the Polish government decided that it was impossible to carry out the defence on Polish territories. It ordered all units to evacuate Poland and reorganize in France.

Meanwhile, Polish forces tried to move towards the Romanian bridgehead area, still actively resisting the German invasion.

From 17 September to 20 September, the Polish Armies Kraków and Lublin were crippled at the Battle of Tomaszów Lubelski, the second largest battle of the campaign. Oksywie garrison held until 19 September. Polish gained victory at the battle of Szack, and the Red Army reached the line of rivers Narew, Bug, Vistula and San by September 28, in many cases meeting German units advancing from the other side. The last operational unit of the Polish Army, General Franciszek Kleeberg's Samodzielna Grupa Operacyjna "Polesie", capitulated after the 4-day Battle of Kock near Lublin on 6 October, marking the end of the September Campaign.

Adolf Hitler had argued in Mein Kampf of the necessity of acquiring new territory for German settlement (Lebensraum) in Eastern Europe. However, these plans were delayed through the period of the Phoney War, followed by the Nazi invasions of Norway, France and Benelux, Denmark, and the failed Battle of Britain.

Polish citizens took an active part in the Soviet partisan movement in the occupied territory of the former USSR. 2,500 Polish citizens took part in the Soviet partisan movement in the territory of the Byelorussian SSR, of which 703 were awarded with Soviet state awards A further 2000 Polish citizens took part in the Soviet partisan movement on the territory of the USSR.

== June 1941 – September 1941 ==
At 04:45 on 22 June 1941, four million German soldiers, to be joined by Italian, Romanian and other Axis troops over the following weeks, burst over the borders and stormed into the Soviet Union, including the Byelorussian SSR. For a month the offensive was completely unstoppable north of the Pripiet marshes, as the Panzer forces encircled hundreds of thousands of Soviet troops in huge pockets that were then reduced by slower-moving infantry divisions while the panzers charged on, following the Blitzkrieg doctrine.

Army Group Centre comprised two Panzer groups (2nd and 3rd), which rolled east from either side of Brest and affected a double encirclement at Belostok and west of Minsk. They were followed by 2nd, 4th and 9th Armies. The combined Panzer force reached the Berezina river in just six days, 650 km (400 mi) from their start lines. The next objective was to cross the Dnieper river, which was accomplished by 11 July. Following that, their next target was Smolensk, which fell on 16 July, but the engagement in the Smolensk area blocked the German advance until mid-September, effectively disrupting the blitzkrieg.

Operation Barbarossa: the German invasion of the Soviet Union, 21 June 1941 to 5 December 1941 to 9 July 1941 to 1 September 1941 to 9 September 1941 to 5 December 1941

With the capture of Smolensk and the advance to the Luga river, Army Groups Centre and North had completed their first major objective: to get across and hold the "land bridge" between the Dvina and Dnieper.

The German generals argued for an immediate drive towards Moscow, but Hitler overruled them, citing the importance of Ukrainian grain and heavy industry if under German possession, not to mention the massing of Soviet reserves in the Gomel area between Army Group Centre's southern flanks and the bogged-down Army Group South to the south.

After a meeting held in Orsha between the head of the Army General Staff, General Halder, and the heads of three Army Groups and armies, it was decided to push forward to Moscow since it was better, as argued by head of Army Group Center, Field Marshal Fedor von Bock, for them to try their luck on the battlefield rather than just sit and wait while their opponent gathered more strength.

== Occupation and Collaboration 1941 – June 1944 ==
Atrocities against the Jewish population in the conquered areas began almost immediately, with the dispatch of Einsatzgruppen (task groups) to round up Jewish people and shoot them. Local gentiles were encouraged to carry out their own pogroms. By the end of 1941, there were more than 50,000 troops devoted to rounding up and killing Jews. In three years of occupation, between one and two million Soviet Jews were killed.

== June 1944 – May 1945 ==
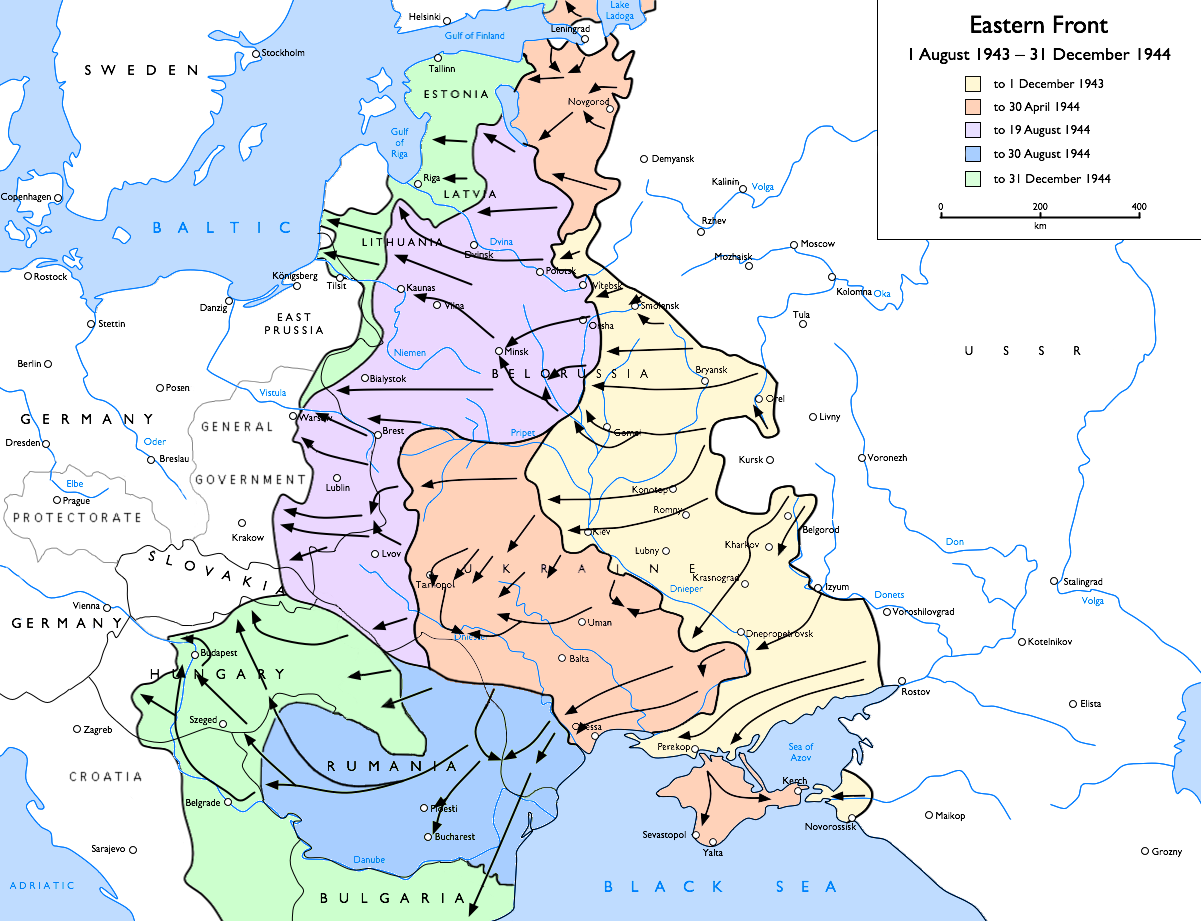
Soviet advances from 1 August 1943 to 31 December 1944 to 1 December 1943 to 30 April 1944 to 19 August 1944 to 31 December 1944

In the summer of 1944 a balcony-shaped frontline had shaped following advances by the Red Army during late 1943. This invited an encirclement attack to cut off and destroy Army Group Centre. For Operation Bagration, as it was to be called, the Red Army achieved a ratio of ten to one in tanks and seven to one in aircraft over the enemy. At the points of attack, the numerical and quality advantages of the Soviets were overwhelming. More than 2.5 million Soviet troops went into action against the German Army Group Centre, which could boast a strength of less than 800,000 men. The Germans crumbled, with the loss of almost 400,000 men who were either overrun or encircled. Minsk, the capital, was taken on 3 July 1944, trapping 100,000 Germans. Ten days later the Red Army reached the prewar Polish border. In West Belarus, as the Red Army approached the Polish Home Army launched the Operation Tempest. Despite the war now passing out of Belarus, the Soviet Fronts name "Byelorussian" kept their name until the end of the war, and were to distinguish themselves in the battles in Poland and Germany in 1944 and 1945.

In the Soviet Union the end of World War II in Europe is considered to be 9 May, when the surrender took effect Moscow time. This date is celebrated as a national holiday, Victory Day, or День Победы in Belarus, Russia and some other post-Soviet countries.

== Belarusian volunteers in German forces ==
- Belarusian Abwehr/Brandenburg Sabouteur agents
- Vorkommando Einsatzgruppe B, also Vorkommando Moskau
- Belarusian Interior Guard
- 29th Waffen-SS Division/(weissruthenische Gr.)
- Waffen-Grenadier-Brigade der SS (weißruthenische Nr. 1)
- 30.Waffen-Grenadier-Division der SS (weissruthenische Nr. 1)
- weissruthenische Waffen-Grenadier-Regiment der SS 75
- I./weissruthenische Waffen-Grenadier-Regiment der SS 75
- II./weissruthenische Waffen-Grenadier-Regiment der SS 75
- III./weissruthenische Waffen-Grenadier-Regiment der SS 75
- weissruthenische Artillerie-Abteilung
- weissruthenische Panzerjäger-Abteilung
- weissruthenische Reiter-Schwadron
- Waffen Sturm-brigade Belarus
- "Black Cat" Special undercover unit

== German commanders and officers linked with Belarus ==
- Generalkommissar Wilhelm Kube, head of the civil administration
- SS-Obergruppenführer Curt von Gottberg, SS and Police Leader; succeeded Kube as Generalkommissar
- Wehrmacht Generalleutnant Reinhard Gehlen, Chief of German East-Front Intelligence with offices in Smolensk
- SS-Gruppenführer Jakob Sporrenberg, SS and Police Leader
- SS-Brigadeführer Dr. Franz Six
- SS-Obersturmbannführer Hans Siegling
- SS-Obersturmbannführer Otto Skorzeny

== Belarusian Anti-Soviet commanders ==
- Źmicier Kasmovič, the police chief of Smolensk
- Francišak Kušal, Commander of local BKA police forces
- Michał Vituška, Commander of Čorny Kot

== Timeline ==
=== 1939 ===
- 14 – 17 September Battle of Brześć Litewski.
- 17 September The eastern front of the Campaign opens with the invasion of Poland by the Soviet Union. Kutno falls to the 8th Army and Brześć Litewski falls to the 3rd Army.
- 18 September Red Army reach Wilno and Brześć.
- 21 – 24 September Battle of Grodno (1939).
- 2 October The Battle of Kock begins with a German advance.
- 6 October The Battle of Kock ends with the surrender of defending Polish forces. This is the final significant military resistance to the German or Soviet invasions.

=== 1940 ===
- Spring Dr. Franz Six, a former professor of political science and head of the Vorkommando (SS forward unit) for Einsatzgruppe B (Einsatzgruppen), made contact with the local branch of the Belarusian "self-help" organization in Warsaw and put together a task force of some thirty to forty trusted Belarusians to serve as guides, administrators and informers.

=== 1941 ===
- 22 June Operation Barbarossa launched — Axis invasion of the Soviet Union, including Byelorussian SSR.
- 22 June – 9 July Battle of Białystok-Minsk — Soviet 3rd and 10th armies encircled.
- 10 July – 10 September Battle of Smolensk — Soviet 16th and 20th armies encircled.
- August Following bloody encirclement battles, all of the Byelorussian SSR territory was occupied by Nazi Germany.
- Battle of Vyazma-Bryansk.
- 13 October - establishment of the Belarusian Self-Help (Беларуская Самапомач), a nationwide Belarusian charitable organisation offering medical assistance and material support to the local population.

=== 1942 ===
- January – April Rzhev-Vyazma Offensive (1942) — disastrous Soviet attempt to cut off the Rzhev salient.
- 10 May Maly Trostenets extermination camp.
- July First Rzhev-Sychevka Offensive in Russia.
- July - establishment of the Maly Trascianiec extermination camp
- November – December Second Rzhev-Sychevka Offensive — another disastrous Soviet attempt to cut off Rzhev salient; Georgy Zhukov's worst defeat.
- 24 December - padre Vincent Hadleŭski, a leader of the Belarusian antifascist pro-independence movement, executed by Nazis in Maly Trascianiec

=== 1943 ===
- March - Rzhev-Vyazma Offensive (1943) in Russia.
- 22 July - establishment of the Union of Belarusian Youth, an influential nationalist group
- 30 July In the largest partisan sabotage action of the entire Second World War, the so-called Asipovičy diversion: four German trains with supplies and Tiger tanks were destroyed.
- August Donbas strategic offensive (August 1943)
- August Battle of Belgorod.
- Battle of Smolensk (1943).
- October Battle of Lenino.
- 5 December: assassination of Vaclaŭ Ivanoŭski, mayor of Minsk
- December: establishment of the Belarusian Central Rada, a Belarusian self-government.

=== 1944 ===
- 22 June - the Second All-Belarusian Congress took place in Minsk Opera a few days before the city was recaptured by the Red Army. The Congress gathered 1,039 delegates from all Belarusian provinces and proclaimed the independence of Belarus.
- 28 June The SS assigned a special train that carried 800 collaborators and their families to Germany.
- June – August Operation Bagration — destruction of German Army Group Centre.
- Autumn: the Belarusian Independence Party starts active armed resistance to the returned Soviet regime. 30 Belarusians were airdropped in Belarus. These were known as Čorny Kot led by Michał Vituška. They had some initial success due to disorganization in the Red Army's rear-guard. Anti-Soviet partisan resistance in Belarus lasted until at least the late 1950s.

=== 1945 ===
- Čorny Kot carries out guerrilla warfare against Soviet forces.
- At the end of 1945 Radasłaŭ Astroŭski held a special meeting of the Belarusian Central Council which decided to dissolve the government in order to avoid being sent back to Byelorussian SSR as war criminals. The BCR was eventually revived in exile by Astroŭski and his group and became one of the political centres of the Belarusian diaspora until its dissolution in the 1980s.

== See also ==
- Battle of Brześć Litewski
- Battle of Grodno (1939)
- Battle of Smolensk (1941)
- Belarusian resistance movement
- Brest-Litovsk fortress
- Łachwa Ghetto
- Maly Trostenets extermination camp
- Occupation of Belarus by Nazi Germany
- Reichskommissariat Ostland
- 30th Waffen Grenadier Division of the SS (1st Belarusian)
