= Belarusian Independence Party =

Belarusian Independence Party Беларуская незалежніцкая партыя
- Founded: 1939
- Dissolved: 1949
- Ideology: Belarusian nationalism Anti-communism

The Belarusian Independence Party (Belarusian: Беларуская незалежніцкая партыя, БНП, Biełaruskaja niezaležnickaja partyja, BNP) was a Belarusian nationalist political organization during the Second World War.

== Creation ==
The BNP was probably created in 1939—1940 in Vilnius (according to a different version, in Minsk in 1942). The initiator of its creation was Father Vincent Hadleŭski. The organization was composed predominantly of young people.

Formally the BNP introduced itself as a patriotic undercover organization fighting for the independence of Belarus, but in reality its leadership cooperated with the German Abwehr from the very beginning.

The BNP started its practical activity in June 1944 by creating several undercover guerrilla troops in Belarus to fight against the approaching Red Army. (according to other sources, the training of such groups has been organized with the help of Abwehr in autumn 1943, especially actively in winter and spring of 1944).

As its political programme the BNP proposed to use the "inevitable conflict" between the USSR and its Western Allies after the victory over Germany in the Second World War to gain independence for Belarus.

After evacuation in 1944, the Foreign Sector of the BNP was created in Germany, led by Dzmitryj Kasmovič.

== Relations with the Belarusian Central Rada ==
In 1944 the leaders of the BNP heavily criticized the Belarusian Central Rada, the pro-German government of Belarus, and its leader Radasłaŭ Astroŭski for taking a loyal position towards the Nazis. In early 1945 the BNP stopped all cooperation with the BCR.

The BNP especially criticized the badly organized evacuation and practical liquidation of the Biełaruskaja Krajovaja Abarona, the military of the BCR, and Astroŭski's inefficient attempts to create a Belarusian army in Germany.

Several guerrilla units of the BNP continued its activities in Soviet-occupied Belarus in 1945-1946 but were soon liquidated by the Soviets.

== Activity after the war ==
After the war the BNP acted among Belarusian refugees in Western Europe. The organization underwent many internal conflicts and a split in two parts in 1948-1949. In 1954 the BNP recognized the Belarusian Central Rada as "the only legitimate and representative centre".

== Structure ==
The organization had a Central Committee and five regional committees.

Leadership:

- Usievaład Rodźka (Central Committee)
- Dzmitryj Kasmovič (member of the CC)
- Michał Vituška (member of the CC)
- Juljan Sakovič (Minsk District Committee)
- Francišak Alachnovič (Vilnius District Committee)
- and others.

In 1942-1943 the BNP had its branches in the regions of Briansk and Smalensk as well.

== Publishing activity ==
Under the Nazi occupation of Belarus the BNP published a formally illegal bulletin Biuleten BNP ("Бюлетэнь БНП", The BNP Bulletin), after the war - the bulletin Praca i Vola ("Праца і Воля", Labour and Freedom, two issues published in 1949).

== Sources ==
- (Туронак) Jerzy Turonek, Bialorus pod okupacja niemiecka. "WERS", Warszawa—Wroclaw, 1989. 186 s.
- (Ёрш) Сяргей Ёрш, Вяртаньне БНП. Асобы і дакумэнты Беларускай Незалежніцкай Партыі. — Менск-Слонім: БГАКЦ, 1998. — 186 с. — (Архіў Найноўшае Гісторыі). ISBN 985-6012-62-7.
- С. Ёрш, С. Горбік, Беларускі супраціў. Львоў, 2006.
- Д. Касмовіч, Успаміны пра Беларускую Незалежніцкую Партыю (БНП)
