= Jazep Sažyč =

Belarusian politician (1917–2007)

- Язэп Сажыч
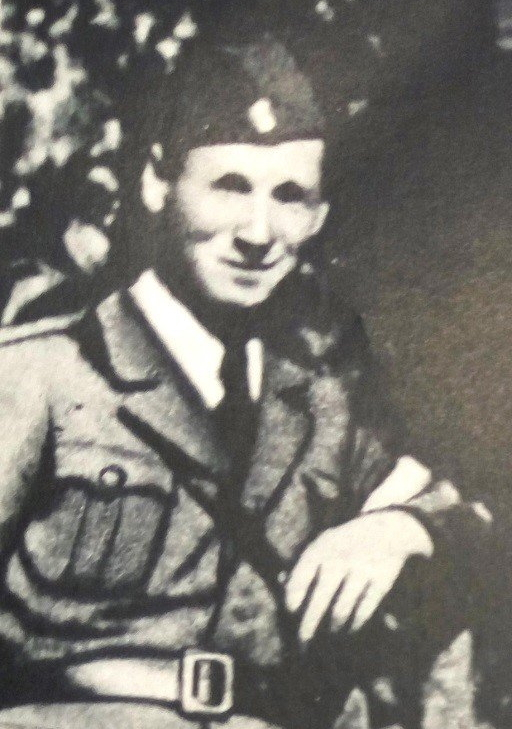
- Sažyč in between 1942 and 1944

President of the Rada of the Belarusian Democratic Republic in exile
- In office November 1980 – 1997
- Preceded by: Vincent Žuk-Hryškievič
- Succeeded by: Ivonka Survilla

Personal details
- Born: 5 September 1917 Haradziečna, Russian Empire (present-day Belarus)
- Died: 19 November 2007 (aged 90) Detroit, Michigan, U.S.
- Party: Belarusian Independence Party
- Education: University of Marburg
- Profession: Military officer, Doctor

Jazep Symonavič Sažyč (Note: Belarusian: Язэп Сымонавіч Сажыч, romanized: Yazep Symonavich Sazhych, anglicized: Joseph Sazyc) (5 September 1917 – 19 November 2007), also spelled Joseph Sazyc was a Belarusian politician and military commander.

== Life in the Second Polish Republic ==
Jazep Sažyč was born in Haradziečna (now in Navahrudak district, Grodno Region). He graduated from a Polish gymnasium in Nowogródek. In 1938 he was mobilized into the Polish army where he underwent an officer training course. During the German invasion of Poland Sažyč was commander of a minor military unit. He was wounded and taken by the Germans as a POW. He was later transferred to a hospital in Łódź from where he managed to get to Białystok and later to Navahrudak. He worked as an accountant in a village store and enlisted as a student at the University of Lviv.

However, with Germany attacking the Soviet Union, Sažyč was mobilized into the Red Army. He soon deserted and returned to Lviv, where he worked at a shop and supported the Organization of Ukrainian Nationalists.

He then went back to Navahrudak where he joined Belarusian collaborators organizing military units. Sažyč served in the local pro-German police. In 1942 he was appointed commandant of the Under Officer School of the Belarusian Self Help. In February 1943 he was given the task to organize a Belarusian railway guard unit in Lida. From July 1943 he taught at an officer school in Minsk.

In early 1944 Jazep Sažyč joined the Biełaruskaja Krajovaja Abarona and, at the same time, the Belarusian Independence Party.

== In emigration ==
In July 1944 Sažyč left Belarus for the Western Front in Saarbrücken. The Belarusian undercover government gave him the task to establish contacts with the French Resistance. However, as the Germans got to know about that, Sažyč was immediately transferred to Berlin. In Berlin, he was participating in training the Čorny Kot partisan troupe and was commandant of the officer school of the 30th Waffen Grenadier Division of the SS (1st Belarusian).

After the war ended he landed in Thuringia, later moved to Hessen. After that, he studied medicine at the University of Marburg.

Upon graduation, in 1950 he left for the United States, where he worked as anesthesiologist and became actively involved in the life of the Belarusian diaspora in the USA.

Jazep Sažyč was one of the founders of the Belarusian-American Association in Michigan. From 1953 he was a member of the Belarusian People's Republic government in exile; between 1980 and 1997 he was the government's president.

He died in Detroit, Michigan in 2007.
