= Michał Vituška =

Belarusian Axis collaborator

- Міхал Апанасавіч Вітушка
- Born: 5 November 1907; Nyasvizh, Minsk Governorate, Russian Empire (today Belarus)
- Died: 7 January 1945 (aged 37); Byelorussian SSR, Soviet Union (today Belarus)
- Military career
- Allegiance: Belarusian Central Council; Nazi Germany; Belarusian Independence Party
- Branch: Byelorussian Home Defence; SS Jagdverbände
- Service years: 1941–1945
- Commands: Black Cat
- Conflicts: World War II
- Awards: Order of the Pahonia

Michał Apanasavič Vituška (Belarusian: Міхал Апанасавіч Вітушка; Russian: Михаи́л Афана́сьевич Виту́шко, romanized: Mikhaíl Afanásyevich Vitúshko; Polish: Michał Wituszka; 5 November 1907 – 7 January 1945) was a Belarusian leader of the Black Cats, a unit of the SS-Jagdverbände, during World War II.

== Biography ==
Michał Apanasavič Vituška was born in the city of Nyasvizh in the Minsk Governorate of the Russian Empire (present-day Belarus) and studied in Belarusian gymnasiums in Kletsk and Vilnius. He graduated from a university in Prague and the Warsaw University of Technology. In Warsaw, Vituška joined the Belarusian Student Movement. Between 1939 and 1940, he served under the Chief of Soviet Police in Nyasvizh.

On 2 November 1939, after the Soviet invasion of Poland, the territories of West Belarus were annexed by the Soviet Union. The local population remained disaffected towards the Soviet occupants, so when Germany invaded the Soviet Union, many people organized around the Belarusian Central Council, a Belarusian representative council in the Nazi-occupied Belarus, Vituška among them. In August 1941 he became one of the commanders of the Belarusian Self-Defense units formed in the Western part of Belarus. He was also a chief organizer of the Belarusian Auxiliary Police in Minsk. From 1942 to 1943 he organized Belarusian forces in Bryansk, Smolensk and Mogilev. He also became a part of the Belarusian Self-Help and had the rank of a major in the Byelorussian Home Defence. He took part in the 2nd Belarusian congress and beginning in the late summer of 1944 was also the officer of the Dallwitz parachute battalion.

Still, soon some Belarusian national activists including Vituška formed a pro-Nazi Belarusian Independence Party (Belarusian: Беларуская незалежніцкая партыя, romanized: Biełaruskaja nezaležnickaja partyja) that was led by Vituška along with Vincent Hadleŭski and Usievalad Rodzka. However, unlike Hadleŭski, who would later turn against Germany, Vituška remained at Germany's side until his ultimate death.

=== Black Cats ===
Meanwhile, special units (SS-Jagdverbände, 'SS Hunter Units') of local collaborationists were trained by the Germans to infiltrate the Soviet rear. They were trained in Dahlwitz near Berlin by SS-Standartenführer Otto Skorzeny. The paratroopers came from Reichskommissariat Ostland; and were split into commandos based on the country of origin. As part of the Nazi effort to combat the growing Soviet partisan movement in Belarus during the war, some thirty Belarusians from the espionage and sabotage outfit known as Čorny Kot (Чорны Кот, "Black Cat"), led by Vituška, were airdropped by the Luftwaffe in late 1944 behind the lines of the Red Army. At that time, the German forces had been expelled from the present-day Belarus during Operation Bagration.

The Black Cats experienced some initial successes due to disorganization in the rear of the Red Army. Other German-trained Belarusian nationalist units also slipped through the Białowieża Forest in 1945. Vituška became the leader of a small anti-Soviet movement in Belarus. However, the NKVD secret police informants infiltrated these units. As a result, they were ambushed and killed in short order.

According to both western sources, such as the British MI6, and the Soviet MGB, agreed that Vituška was likely executed in January 1945, and that organised resistance in Belarus had ceased by 1946. This conclusion is supported by historians Anton Rudak and Igor Valakhanovich.

Conspiracy theories as to Vituška's continued survival, however, persist. Siarhiey Jarš in 2006 claimed Vituška's son had told him that he had died in a sanatorium at 98 in Munich. However, no proof for his claims has been provided.

== Legacy ==
Historian Andrej Kotljarchuk writes that Vituška is a popular figure for far-right and conservative circles of Belarusian youth. The myth, according to which Vituška led an anti-Soviet partisan army in 1944–1959, was created by veterans in exile and reimported to Belarus after it gained independence in 1991.

Vituška is honoured by the Young Front. On 5 November 2007, activists of the organization were arrested after celebrating Vituška's hundredth birthday. On 25 March 2014 members of the Young Front visited a demonstration with a banner, featuring Vituška along with Vincent Hadleŭski, Stepan Bandera, Stanisław Bułak-Bałachowicz and Roman Shukhevych bearing the description: "Heroes do not die".

In 1949, several Belarusian anti-Soviet partisans, including Vituška, were awarded the Order of the Pahonia by decree of the President of the Rada of the Belarusian Democratic Republic, Mikola Abramchyk. He was also awarded the Order of the Iron Knight, 3rd Class by the Rada.

== See also ==
- Belarusian Central Rada
- Occupation of Belarus by Nazi Germany
