= Belarusian Resistance =

Belarusian Resistance may refer to:

- Belarusian resistance movement
- Belarusian resistance during World War II
- Belarusian opposition
- Belarusian partisan movement (2020–present)
