= Belarusian Peasants' and Workers' Union =

Former political party in Poland

Belarusian Peasants' and Workers' Union Беларуская Сялянска-Работніцкая Грамада Biełaruskaja Sialanska-Rabotnickaja Hramada
- Founded: July 1925
- Dissolved: De-legalized on March 21, 1927
- Headquarters: Wilno, Poland
- Membership (November 1936): 120,000
- Ideology: Belarusian separatism Socialism; Left-wing nationalism Agrarian socialism
- Political position: Left-wing
- Colours: White, red and white
- Sejm: 4

Party flag

The Belarusian Peasants' and Workers' Union or the Hramada (Belarusian: Белару́ская сяля́нска-рабо́тніцкая грамада́, romanized: Biełaruskaja Sialanska-Rabotnickaja Hramada, Polish: Białoruska Włościańsko-Robotnicza Hromada) was a socialist agrarian political party created in 1925 by a group of Belarusian deputies to the Sejm of the Second Polish Republic that included Branisłaŭ Taraškievič, Symon Rak-Michajłoŭski, Piotra Miatła, and the founder of Hramada, Pavieł Vałošyn. The group received logistical help from the Soviet Union, and financial aid from the Comintern.

== Ideology ==
The main points of BPWU's program were: the democratic self-governance for West Belarus within Poland, introduction of an eight-hour working day, the recognition of the Belarusian language in Poland as a second official language, the cancellation of the "colonization of Belarus" by the Polish Osadniks, and the free distribution to peasants of land owned by landlords upon its confiscation. There was also a semi-official goal to unite all of Belarusians of West Belarus and East Belarus within one Soviet state.

== Background ==
Hramada was formed legally in July 1925. Its leaders were among prominent members of the Belarusian national liberation movement of the early 20th century: Symon Rak-Michajloŭski has previously been a high-ranking diplomat for the Belarusian Democratic Republic, Branisłaŭ Taraškievič is known as the creator of the first modern Belarusian grammar.

The Polish authorities began to suppress the activities of the Hramada in late 1926 due to its policy coordination with the delegalized Communist Party of Western Belarus. Belarusian media in Poland faced increased pressure and censorship from the authorities.

== Membership and structure ==
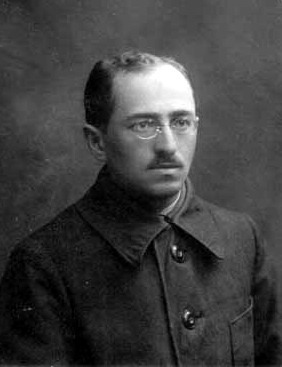
Branisłaŭ Taraškievič, one of the leaders of the BPWU

Membership numbers of the Hramada grew on a very fast pace with sometimes entire Belarusian villages becoming members. By November 1926 the party has enrolled 120,000 members, which is believed to be the largest political party in Belarusian history today, and one of the largest revolutionary-democratic organizations of its time.

The Hramada had party cells in the following powiats of the Nowogródek Voivodeship in Second Polish Republic: Baranovichi (Baranowicze), Bielsk, Valozhyn (Wołożyn), Vawkavysk (Wołkowysk), Vileyka (Wilejka), Wilno, Grodno, Dzisna, Kosava, Lida, Maladzyechna, Navahrudak, Pastavy, Pinsk, Slonim, Stouptsy and Sokółka.

The Belarusian Peasants' and Workers' Union Hramada established several periodicals devoted not only to politics, but also to culture and business, including Zyccio bielarusa, Bielaruskaja niva, Bielaruskaja sprava, Narodnaja sprava, and Nasa sprava. The total circulation of publications of the Hramada in early 1927 was above 10,000 copies.

== Radicalization and dissolution ==
As the years went on, due to ongoing polonization of West Belarus (called Kresy macroregion in interwar Poland) and increasingly discriminatory and nationalistic policies of the central Polish government, the Belarusian national movement in grew more loyal to the Soviet regime and its communist ideology. The Soviets also gained increasingly more control over the Belarusian Peasants' and Workers' Union, and gave the Belarusian national liberation movement in Poland a communist context. According to Polish sources in Belarus, the Hramada received not only logistical, but also physical help from the Soviet Union, and financial aid from the Comintern.

The connection between Hramada and the delegalized Communist Party of Western Belarus aided by Moscow was inevitably discovered by the Polish authorities. On 15 January 1927 some top activists of Hramada were arrested under the charge of subversive anti-Polish activities. The trial of the leaders of Hramada became known as the Trial of the Fifty Six (Belarusian: Працэс 56-ці). The leaders including Branisłaŭ Taraškievič, Symon Rak-Michajłoŭski, Piotra Miatła, and Pavieł Vałošyn, were each sentenced to 12 years in prison. The Polish authorities handed them over to the Soviets in 1930 (Rak-Michajłoŭski, Vałošyn, Miatła) and 1933 (Taraškievič) in exchange for political prisoners held in the USSR (including the West Belarusian journalist and playwright Francišak Alachnovič). A few years later, all four former leaders of the Hramada were either executed by the Soviet regime as "Polish spies" or sent to perish in the GULAG.

In the aftermath of the party's de-legalisation, on February 3, 1927 a riot erupted in Kosava where the Soviet diversionist cell was already formed by Moscow with all required help. Polish police responded to attacks with fire, killing 6 people and wounding several dozens.

== Historical role, legacy and criticism ==
According to historian Andrew Savchenko, by 1927 the Hramada organization was controlled entirely by agents deployed from Moscow, whose aim was to destabilize the region and recruit partisans. According to Polish media, the Hramada turned into a cover for infiltration of Poland by the Soviet Union. According to Savchenko, BPWU only theoretically demanded independence for Belarus, but in practice promoted only the idea of incorporating the ethnically Belarusian lands into the Soviet Union which meant yet another partition of Poland. The Russian agents attempted to isolate the Belarusian ethnic minority in Poland from the political process in the country. In turn, Hramada leaders did exactly what their Moscow advisers suggested they do, and disseminated Comintern propaganda, which resulted in the rapid growth of its rank and file. By March 1927 the party had 120,000 members. The membership of the Communist Party decreased at the same time by a thousand.

In Belarus, the BPWU is viewed positively by both the official regime and the opposition. It is seen as a mass democratic party that emerged in West Belarus as a response to harsh ethnic discrimination of the Belarusians in mid-war Poland. It is being pointed out that the Hramada was persecuted by both the Polish regime and by the Stalinist USSR.

== Notable members ==
- Branisłaŭ Taraškievič, linguist, writer, later executed by the Soviets in 1938
- Symon Rak-Michajłoŭski (be-tarask), former diplomat of the Belarusian Democratic Republic, later executed by the Soviets in 1938
- Michaś Mašara (be-tarask), writer and poet
- Piotra Miatła (be-tarask), later sentenced to 10 years in GULAG, died in a concentration camp
- Ryhor Šyrma (be-tarask), musician and composer
- Pavieł Vałošyn (be-tarask), later executed by the Soviets in 1937
- Ludvika Sivickaja (alias Zośka Vieras) (be-tarask), poet and writer, former member of the Rada BNR and delegate to the First All-Belarusian Congress
- Radaslau Astrouski, later President of the Belarusian Central Rada and member of the Belarusian community in the United States

== See also ==
- Communist Party of West Belarus
- Belarusian Social Democratic Party (Assembly)
