= Andrej Kotljarchuk =

Swedish historian of Belarusian descent (born 1968)

Dr. Andrej Kotljarchuk
- Андрей Котлярчук
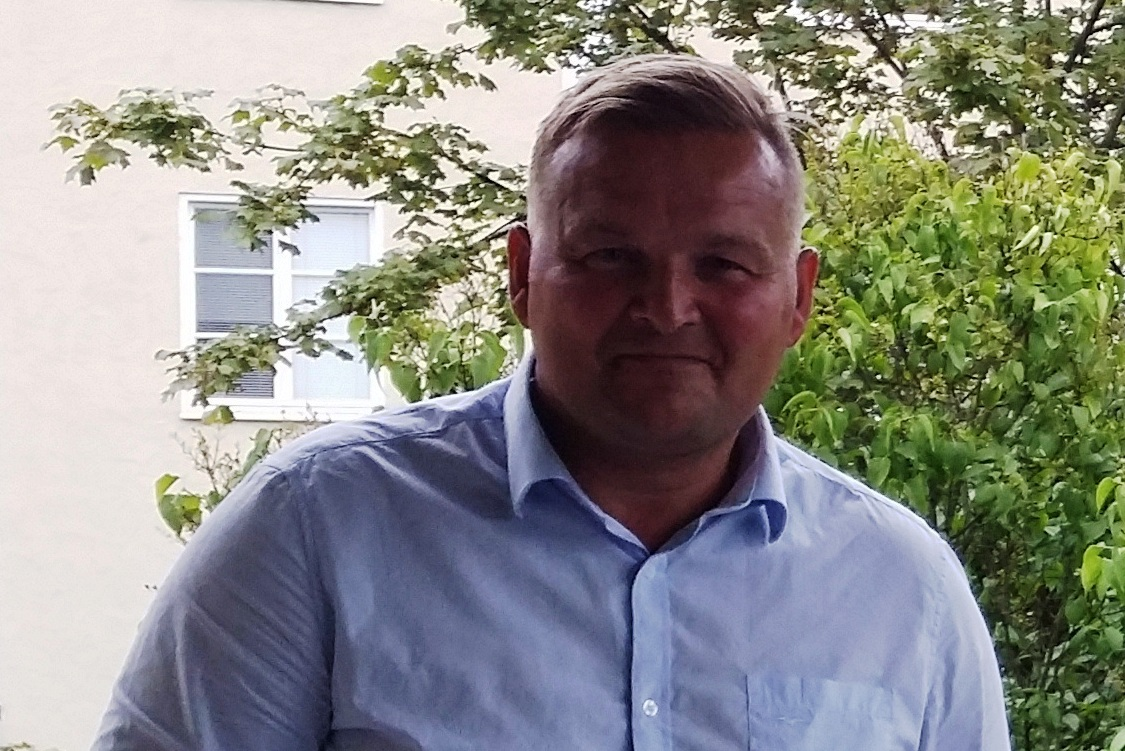
- Born: Novocherkassk (USSR, now Russia)
- Education: Bryansk State University
- Occupation: Historian

Andrej Kotljarchuk (born 1968, Novocherkassk, USSR) is a Swedish historian of Belarusian descent. His research focuses on ethnic minorities and role of experts’ communities, mass violence and the politics of memory.

== Career ==
Kotljarchuk holds a PhD degree in history from Stockholm University (2006) and a candidate of historical science degree from the Russian Academy of Sciences (1999). Currently he is a university lecturer at the Department of History of the Stockholm University and a senior researcher at the School of Historical and Contemporary Studies, Södertörn University.

== Selected works ==
=== Monographs ===
1. In Forge of Stalin. Swedish colonists of Ukraine in the totalitarian experiments of the twenties century (Stockholm University Press/Södertörn University Academic Studies) 2014, 389 pp. ISBN 978-91-87235-96-2. http://www.diva-portal.org/smash/get/diva2:768629/FULLTEXT01.pdf
  Russian edition: V kuznitse Stalina. Shvedskie kolonisty Ukrainy v totalitarnykh experimentakh 20 veka. Moskva: Rosspen. international series "History of Stalinism". 2012. 224 pp. ISBN 978-5-8243-1684-1. http://www.diva-portal.org/smash/get/diva2:579093/FULLTEXT03.pdf
2. In the Shadows of Poland and Russia: the Grand Duchy of Lithuania and Sweden in the European Crisis of the mid-17th Century. PhD dissertation. Södertörn University, 2006, 347 pp. ISBN 91-89315-63-4. http://www.diva-portal.org/smash/get/diva2:200752/FULLTEXT01.pdf
  2nd revised edition: Making the Baltic Union. The 1655 Federation of Kedainiai between Sweden and the Grand Duchy of Lithuania. Saarbrücken: Verlag Dr. Müller, Germany, 2008. 344 pp. ISBN 978-3-639-04331-0.
  Edition in Belarusian: U tsianiu Polshchy i Rasei: Vialikaie kniastva Litouskaie I Shvetsyia u chase eurapeiskaha kryzisu siaredziny XVII st. Minsk: Institute for Belarusian Studies, 2010, 305 pp. ISSN 1392-9682. http://prastora.by/knihi/katliarcuk-andrej-u-cieniu-polscy-i-rasiei-vialikaie-kniastva-litouskaie-i-svecyia-u-casie-eurapiejskaha-kryzisu-siaredz#sthash.D0WsfkSm.dpuf
  Second edition in Belarusian: U tsianiu Polshchy i Rasei: Vialikaie kniastva Litouskaie i Shvetsyia u chase eurapeiskaha kryzisu siaredziny XVII st. Smolensk: Inbelkult, 2015, 305 pp. ISBN 978-5-00076-010-9
3. Shvedy u history i kultury belarusau [Swedes in Belarusian history and culture]. Minsk, 2002, 296 pp. ISBN 985-6599-58-X.
  2nd revised edition: Vilnius: Institute for Belarusian Studies, 2007. http://www.diva-portal.org/smash/get/diva2:860434/FULLTEXT01.pdf
4. Prazdnichnaya kultura v gorodakh Rossii i Belorussii 17 veka: ofitsialnye tseremonii i krestianskaya obriadnost” [The festival culture of the 17th century Russian and Belarusian towns: official ceremonies and popular rite]. St. Petersburg: Slavica Petropolitana, 2001, 240 pp. Russian Academy of Sciences: Diss. ISBN 5-85803-177-3.https://www.livelib.ru/book/1000123027

=== Selected list of peer-reviewed articles and book chapters ===
1. ”Ethnic cleansing in the Barents region”, The Barents Encyclopedia. Umeå, 2016.
2. “Koldyczewo concentration camp” (co-authored with Martin Dean) in: Encyclopedia of Camps and Ghettos, 1933–1945, vol. V Extermination, Transit, and Forced Labor Camps for Jews. Ed. by Martin Dean & Geoffrey Megargee. Bloomington: Indiana University Press, 2016.
3. ”Norwegians in the Stalinist Terror: New Perspectives for Research”, Fortid, 2015:2, pp. 18–22. https://web.archive.org/web/20151222104006/http://www.fortid.no/tidsskrift/download/fortid_2_2015_hires.pdf
4. “Nazi Genocide of Roma in Belarus and Ukraine: the significance of census data and census takers”, Etudes Tsiganes, 2015:1.
5. “The Memory of Roma Holocaust in Ukraine. Mass Graves, Memory Work and the Politics of Commemoration”, Towards a Common Past? Conflicting Memories in Contemporary Europe. Ed. by Barbara Tornqvist-Plewa. Berlin, New York: Walter de Gruyter. 2015.
6. “The 1655 Union of Keidaniai between Lithuania and Sweden: Dynastical Dimensions in Historical Perspective”, Lithuania-Poland-Sweden. European Dynastic Unions and Historical-Cultural Ties, Vilnius: National Museum, 2014, pp. 364–391.
7. “The Nordic Threat: Soviet Ethnic Cleansing on the Kola Peninsula”, The Sea of Identities. A century of Baltic and East European Experiences with Nationality, Class, and Gender, Norbert Götz (ed.), Södertörn University Academic Studies, vol. 60, Stockholm, Elanders, 2014, pp. 53–83. http://www.diva-portal.org/smash/get/diva2:748534/FULLTEXT01.pdf
8. "The Nazi genocide of Roma on the territory of occupied Ukraine: the role of Soviet path dependency in contemporary politics of memory", Holocaust and Modernity, 2014:12, [in Russian] pp. 24–50. https://web.archive.org/web/20160307145025/http://holocaust.kiev.ua/news/jurnal_nodostup/Kotljarchuk12.pdf
9. “Little Red Sweden in Ukraine: the 1930s Comintern project in Gammalsvenskby”, The Lost Swedish Tribe: Reapproaching the history of Gammalsvenskby in Ukraine, Piotr Wawrzeniuk & Julia Malitska (eds.), Södertörns högskola, Huddinge, 2014, pp. 111–149. http://www.diva-portal.org/smash/get/diva2:704718/FULLTEXT01.pdf
10. “World War II Memory Politics: Jewish, Polish and Roma Minorities of Belarus”, The Journal of Belarusian Studies. 2013:1, pp. 7–40. http://belarusjournal.com/article/world-war-ii-memory-politics-jewish-polish-and-roma-minorities-belarus-205
11. ”Kola Sami in the Stalinist terror: a quantitative analysis", Journal of Northern Studies, 2012:2, pp. 59–82. http://www.diva-portal.org/smash/get/diva2:606912/FULLTEXT01.pdf
12. ”Tvångsnormaliseringens teknik och kollektivt motstånd. Ukrainasvenskar i Gulagarkipelagen", Historisk Tidskrift. 2011:1, pp. 3–24. http://www.historisktidskrift.se/fulltext/2011-1/pdf/HT_2011_1_003-024_kotljarchuk.pdf
13. ”Hidden History, Divided Memory: the concentration camp of Kaldycheva in Nazi-occupied Belarus”, Conference paper presented at the international symposium “Nazi Camps in the Occupied Soviet Territories” Paris. The research centre Yahad–In Unum and the Université Paris-IV Sorbonne. September 19–20, 2011. DVD publication. Paris: Yahad–In Unum. 2012, vol. 4.
14. SWOT 2. Analysis and Planning for Cross-border Co-operation in Northern Europe. Institute of International Sociology Gorizia. Council of Europe, 2010, chapter 4.1,. ”Prospects for “good” cross-border cooperation between Belarus and Latvia”; chapter 8 ”Belarus-Latvia”. http://www.diva-portal.org/smash/get/diva2:779068/FULLTEXT01.pdf
15. “Ruthenian Protestants and the Orthodoxy in the Grand Duchy of Lithuania”, Lithuanian Historical Studies. 2009:12, pp. 41–62. ISSN 1392-2343. http://www.diva-portal.org/smash/get/diva2:579102/FULLTEXT02.pdf
16. 10. “Historians in entrenchments: the Belarusian scholarship under Lukashenka”, Ukraina Moderna. 2007. Vol 12:1, pp. 62–71. (In Ukrainian). https://uamoderna.com/images/archiv/12_1/4_UM_12_Doslidzennia__Kotlyarchuk.pdf
17. “Paganism in the Grand Duchy of Lithuania in views of Swedish and English early modern historians”, Druvius. 2008:2, pp. 79–86. (In Belarusian).
18. “Ukrainian Swedes in Komi ASSR: survival and everyday life”, Skandinavskie chteniya 2008. St. Petersburg, pp. 306–325. (In Russian). https://www.kunstkamera.ru/files/lib/978-5-88431-187-9/978-5-88431-187-9_25.pdf
19. “The 1655 Union of Kedainiai between Lithuania and Sweden and the nobility of Grodno”, Haradzienski palimpsest. Bialystok, 2008, pp. 40–48.
20. “Riga and commercial aspects of the Lithuanian-Swedish relations during the first half of the seventeenth century”, Groninger Hanze Studies 2. Ed. Hano Brand, Poul Holm and Leos Müller. Groningen. 2007. pp. 240–249. ISBN 978-90-6550-882-9.
21. “German colonists of Ukraine and their relations with Swedish neighbours”, Voprosy Germanskoi Istorii. Dnepropetrovsk, 2007. (In Russian). pp. 27–35.
22. “Students from the Grand Duchy of Lithuania at the Dutch universities: confession, social and ethnic origin and everyday life”, ARCHE, 2007:11.(in Belarusian). https://store.arche.by/item/1684
23. “The pro-Swedish Advisory Council of the Grand Duchy of Lithuania in 1655-1656: the origin, structure and fate of members”, Faworyci i opozycjoniści. Król a Elity polityczne w Rzeczypospolitej XV-XVII wieku. Krakow, 2006, pp. 311–329.
24. “The Second Northern War and the last Swedish operation in Belarus. A siege of Brest and conflict for the city”, Belarusian Historical Review, vol. XII:1-2. 2006, pp. 30–69. (In Belarusian with summary in Swedish). https://www.belhistory.eu/andrej-katlyarchuk-drugaya-pa%D1%9Enochnaya-vajna-i-aposhnyaya-shvedskaya-aperacyya-%D1%9E-vkl-abloga-berascya-1657-g-i-sprechka-za-mesta/
25. “The tradition of Belarusian Statehood: a war for the past”, Contemporary Change in Belarus. Baltic and Eastern European Studies. Vol. 2. Södertörn University. 2004, pp. 41–72. ISBN 91-85139-02-5.
26. ”Diplomatic relations between Sweden and Ukraine in 1654-1660”, Ukraina i sosednie gosudarstva v XVII. Sankt Petersburg, 2004, pp. 90–107. (In Russian).
27. “The image of Swedes in Belarusian literature”, Annus Albaruthenicus, 2002, vol. 3, pp. 79–93.
28. “Karl XII and Belarusian folklore”, Skandinavskie chteniya 2002. St. Petersburg, pp. 419–427. (In Russian). http://www.kunstkamera.ru/index/science/books/books/skandinavskie_chtenia2002/
29. “Karl XII in Mahileu”, Past and present history of Mahileu. The materials of the international conference. Mahileu. 2001, pp. 95–99. (In Belarusian).
30. “Polish-Church-Slavonic dictionary of Simeon Polatski in Sweden”, Contacts and dialogues. The journal of the International Association for Belarusian studies. Minsk, 2001, vol.6. pp. 31–42. (In Belarusian).
31. “Belarusian minority in the Bryansk region of Russia”, ARCHE, 2001:2, pp. 155–166. (In Belarusian). https://web.archive.org/web/20151222163140/http://arche.bymedia.net/2001-2/katla201.html
32. “Swedes in history and folklore of Belarusians”, Skandinavskie chteniya 1998. St. Petersburg, 2000, pp. 187–193. (In Russian). http://urss.ru/cgi-bin/db.pl?lang=Ru&blang=ru&page=Book&id=71419
33. “The Bakhtin’s theory and the studies of Belarusian popular culture”, Dialogue. Carnival, Chronotop. International Bakhtin Journal, 1998, 3 (24), pp. 46–59. (In Russian). http://nevmenandr.net/dkx/?y=1998&n=3&abs=KOTL

=== Reviews ===
- Weiss-Wendt, Anton (ed.), The Nazi genocide of the Roma: reassessment and commemoration, Berghahn Books, New York, 2013, in: Holocaust and Modernity, 2014:1, pp. 105–118. http://holocaust.kiev.ua/
- Deland, Mats. Purgatorium: Sverige och andra världskrigets förbrytare. Stockholm: Atlas.2012, in: Arche, ISSN 1392-9682, Vol. 5, pp. 166–172. http://www.diva-portal.org/smash/get/diva2:749122/FULLTEXT02.pdf
- Audronė Janužytė Historians as Nation State-Builders: the Formation of Lithuanian University 1904-1922. 2006, in: Nordisk Østforum, ISSN 0801-7220, Vol. 20: 4, pp. 459–461. http://www.diva-portal.org/smash/get/diva2:579147/FULLTEXT02.pdf
- Bernhard Chiari. Alltag hinter der Front: Besatzung, Kollaboration und Widerstand in Weißrußland 1941–1944. Düsseldorf, 1998. Ab Imperio. 2007:3. pp. 482–492. http://abimperio.net/cgi-bin/aishow.pl?state=srch&idlang=2&s=котлярчук
- Gaunt David, Levine Paul A. and Palosuo Laura (eds). 2004. Collaboration and Resistance during the Holocaust. Belarus, Estonia, Latvia, Lithuania. Bern: Peter Lang, 2004. ARCHE, vol. 3. 2005. https://web.archive.org/web/20160304042220/http://arche.bymedia.net/2005-3/katlarcuk305.htm
- Eriksonas, Linas. 2004. National heroes and national identities. Scotland, Norway and Lithuania. Brussels. 320 pp. Belarusian Historical Review, 2004:11. https://www.belhistory.eu/eriksonas-linas-national-heroes-and-national-identities-scotland-norway-and-lithuania-andrej-katlyarchuk/
- Lindner, Rainer. 1999. Historiker und Herrschaft: Nationsbildung und Geschichtspolitik in Weissrussland im 19. und 20. Jahrhundert. München. ARCHE. Minsk, 2004:2. https://web.archive.org/web/20160304035649/http://arche.bymedia.net/2004-2/katlarcuk204.htm
- Stone, Daniel. 2001. The Polish-Lithuanian state, 1386-1795. Seattle: University of Washington Press, 2001. 374 p. ARCHE, vol. 5. 2003. https://web.archive.org/web/20160304022535/http://arche.bymedia.net/2003-5/katl503.html
- Snyder, Timothy. 2003. The reconstruction of Nations. Poland, Ukraine, Lithuania, Belarus 1569-1999. Yale University, USA. 367 p. ARCHE, vol. 2. 2003. https://kamunikat.org/usie_czasopisy.html?pubid=12676
