= Anton Weiss-Wendt =

Norwegian academic and historian (born 1973)

Anton Weiss-Wendt (born 1973) is a Norwegian academic and historian. He has a PhD in Jewish history from Brandeis University and has worked at the Center for Studies of the Holocaust and Religious Minorities since 2006.

== Works ==
- Weiss-Wendt, Anton (2009). Murder Without Hatred: Estonians and the Holocaust. Syracuse University Press. ISBN 978-0-8156-3228-3.
- Weiss-Wendt, Anton (2010). Small Town Russia: Childhood Memories of the Final Soviet Decade. FAP Books, Florida Academic Press. ISBN 978-1-890357-26-9.
- Weiss-Wendt, Anton (2017). On the Margins: About the History of Jews in Estonia. Central European University Press. ISBN 978-963-386-165-3.
- Weiss-Wendt, Anton (2017). The Soviet Union and the Gutting of the UN Genocide Convention. Madison: University of Wisconsin Press. ISBN 978-0-299-31290-9.
- Weiss-Wendt, Anton (2020). Putin’s Russia and the Falsification of History. Reasserting Control over the Past. London: Bloomsbury Academic. ISBN 978-1-350-13053-1.
