= Belarusian resistance movement =

Resistance movements on the territory of modern-day Belarus

Belarusian resistance movement are the resistance movements on the territory of contemporary Belarus.

== Context ==
Wars in the area - Great Northern War and the War of the Polish Succession - damaged its economy. In addition, Russian armies raided the Polish–Lithuanian Commonwealth under the pretext of the returning of fugitive peasants. By mid-18th century their presence in the lands of modern Belarus became almost permanent.

The last attempt to save the Commonwealth's independence was a Polish–Belarusian–Lithuanian national uprising of 1794 led by Tadeusz Kościuszko, however it was eventually quenched.

Eventually by 1795 Poland was partitioned by its neighbors. Thus a new period in Belarusian history started, with all its lands annexed by the Russian Empire, in a continuing endeavor of Russian tsars of "Gathering of the Russian lands" started after the liberation from the Tatar yoke by Grand Duke Ivan III of Russia.

== Resistance in the Russian Empire ==
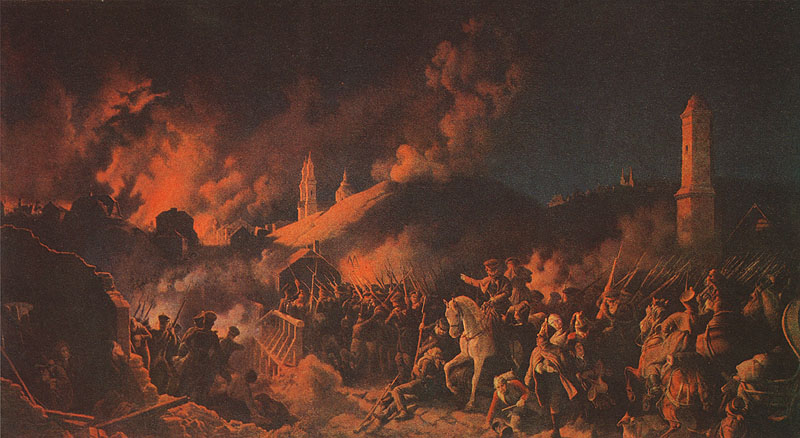
Second battle of Polotsk (1812), as depicted by Peter von Hess

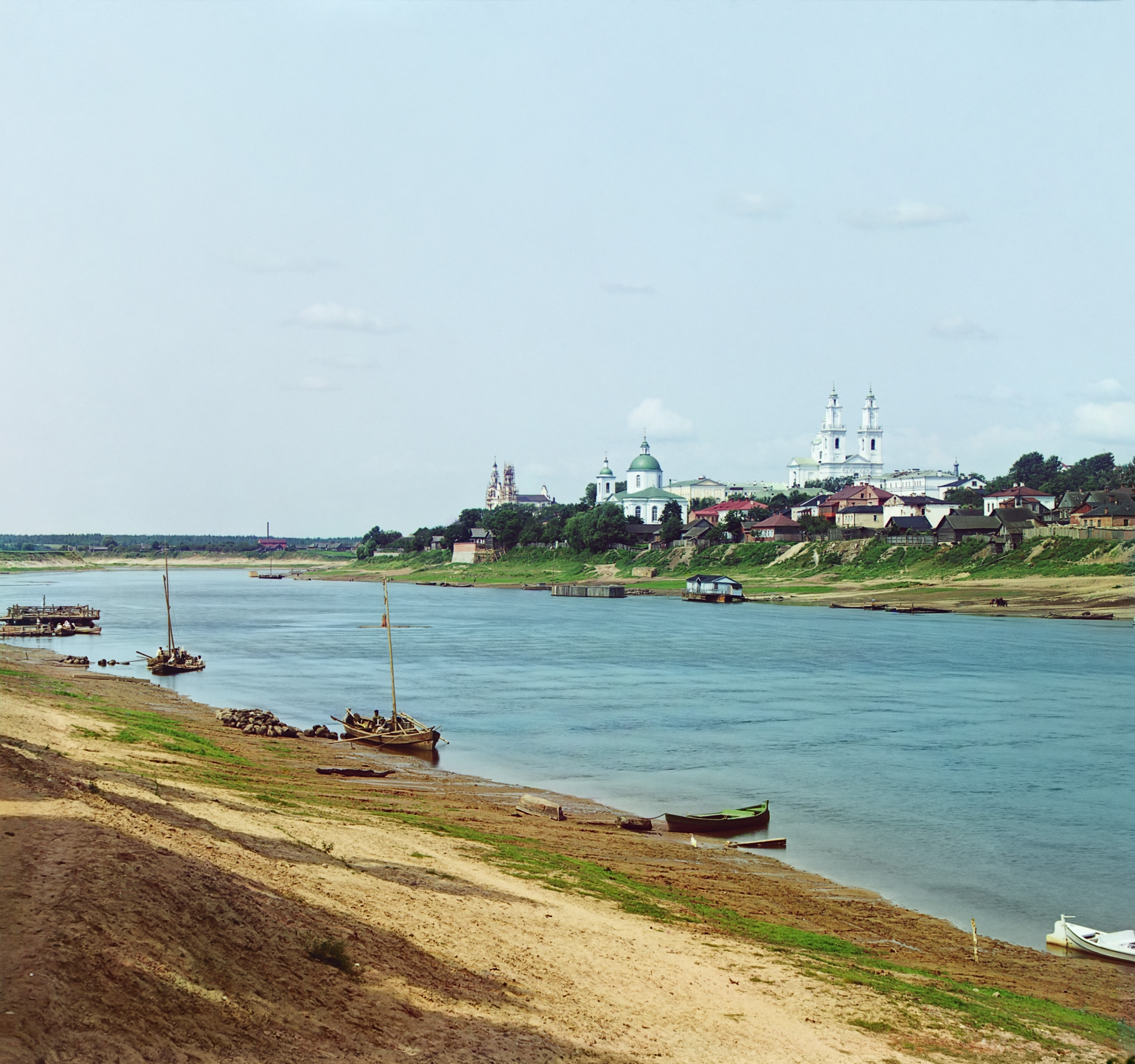
View of Polatsk in 1912

Under Russian administration, the territory of Belarus was divided into the guberniyas of Minsk, Vitebsk, Mogilyov, and Hrodna. With Napoleon's defeat, Belarus again became a part of Imperial Russia and its guberniyas constituted part of the Northwestern Krai. The anti-Russian uprisings of the gentry in 1830 and 1863 were subdued by government forces.

Although under Nicholas I and Alexander III the national cultures were repressed due to the policies of de-Polonization and Russification, which included the return to Orthodoxy, the 19th century was signified by the rise of the modern Belarusian nation and self-confidence. A number of authors started publishing in the Belarusian language, including Jan Czeczot, Władysław Syrokomla and Konstanty Kalinowski.

In a Russification drive in the 1840s, Nicholas I forbade the use of the term Belarusia and renamed the region the "North-Western Territory". He also prohibited the use of Belarusian language in public schools, campaigned against Belarusian publications and tried to pressure those who had converted to Catholicism under the Poles to reconvert to the Orthodox faith. In 1863, economic and cultural pressure exploded into a revolt, led by Kalinowski. After the failed revolt, the Russian government introduced the use of Cyrillic to Belarusian in 1864 and banned the use of the Latin alphabet.

== Resistance after World War I ==
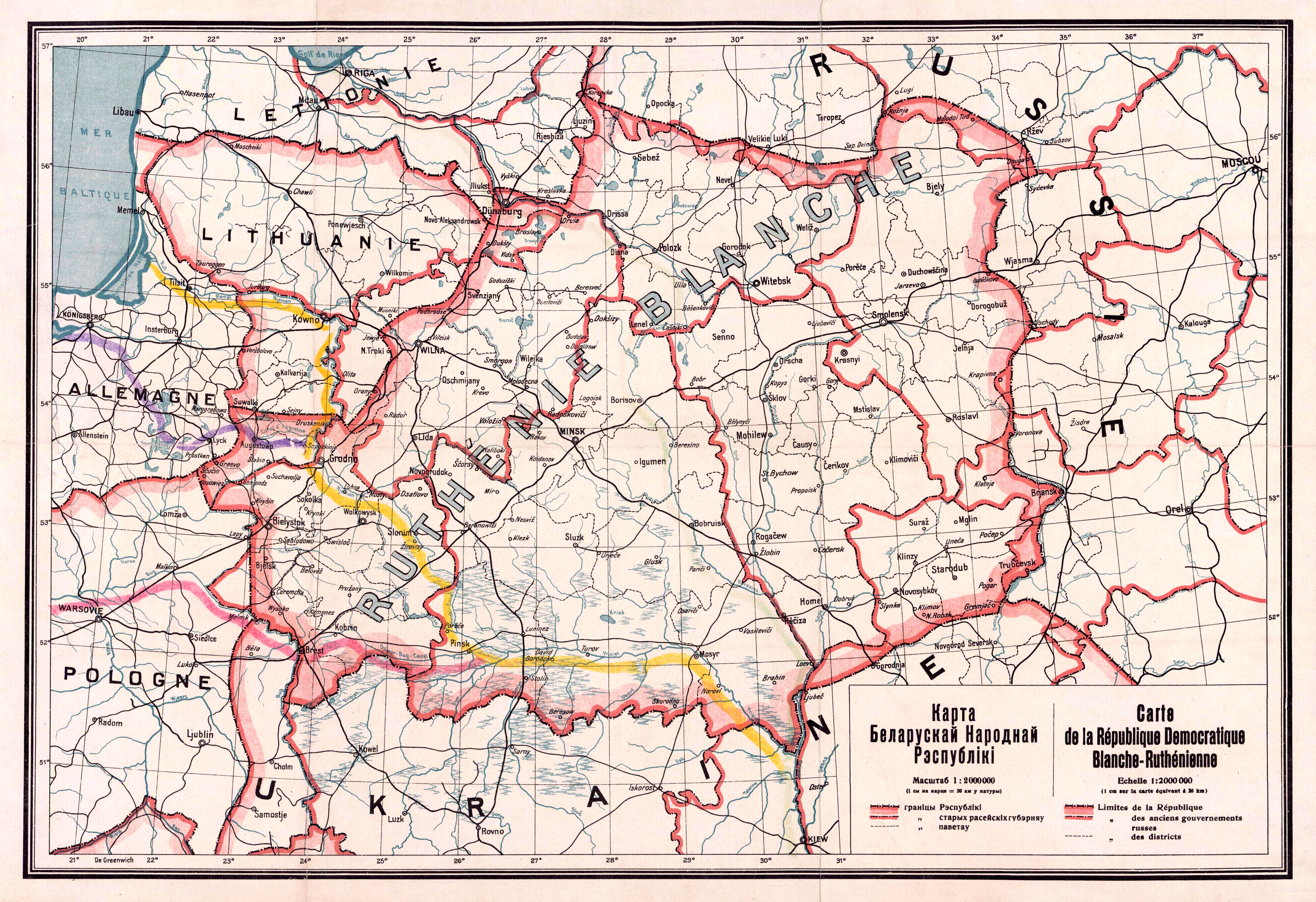
The territory claimed by the Belarusian People's Republic, 1918

World War I was the short period when Belarusian culture started to flourish. German administration allowed schools with Belarusian language, previously banned in Russia; a number of Belarusian schools were created until 1919 when they were banned again by the Polish military administration. At the end of World War I, when Belarus was still occupied by Germans, according to the Treaty of Brest-Litovsk, the short-lived Belarusian People's Republic was pronounced on March 25, 1918, as part of the German Mitteleuropa plan.

In December 1918, Mitteleuropa was obsolete as the Germans withdrew from the Ober Ost territory, and for the next few years in the newly created political vacuum the territories of Belarus would witness the struggle of various national and foreign factions. On January 2, 1919, the Soviet Socialist Republic of Byelorussia was declared. Next month, it was disbanded. Part of it was included into Russian SFSR, and part was joined to the Lithuanian SSR to form the LBSSR, Lithuanian–Byelorussian Soviet Socialist Republic, informally known as Litbel (Note: (rus. Литбел, lit. Litbelas, bel. Літбе́л)). While Belarus National Republic faced off with Litbel, foreign powers were preparing to reclaim what they saw as their territories: Polish forces were moving from the West, and Russians from the East.

Eventually, it was the foreigners who prevailed. When the Red Army entered Minsk on January 5, 1919, the Rada (Council) of the Belarus National Republic went into exile, first to Kaunas, then to Berlin and finally to Prague. Several months later, in August, the Litbel was also dissolved, this time because of the pressure of Polish forces advancing from the West.

Within the USSR, the name of the country was Byelorussian Soviet Socialist Republic. It was declared on January 1, 1919 in Smolensk under the name of Socialist Soviet Republic of Byelorussia (SSRB). Вячаслаў Адамовіч (Wiaczesław Adamowicz/Viačasłaŭ Adamovič; pseudonym A. Dziergacz) planned and initiated military actions by Belarusian troops against the Soviets in Minsk and was also the founder of the partisan (military) unit, Zialony Dub (Green Oak). Some time in 1918 or 1919, Sergiusz Piasecki returned to Belarus, joining the anti-Soviet Zialony Dub, led by ataman Wiaczesław Adamowicz. When on August 8, 1919 Polish Army troops captured Minsk, Adamowicz decided to cooperate with them. Thus, Belarusian units were created and Piasecki was transferred to Warsaw school of infantry cadets. In the summer of 1920, during Polish–Soviet War, Piasecki fought in the Battle of Radzymin. The frontiers between Poland, which had established an independent government following World War I, and the former Russian Empire, were not recognized by the League of Nations. Poland's Józef Piłsudski, who envisioned a federation (Międzymorze), forming an East European bloc to form a bulwark against Russia and Germany, carried out Kiev offensive into Ukraine in 1920, but was met by a Red Army counter-offensive that drove into Polish territory almost to Warsaw. However, Piłsudski halted the Soviet advance at the battle of Warsaw and resumed the offensive. Finally the Treaty of Riga, ending the Polish–Soviet War, divided Belarusian territories between Poland and Soviet Russia. For next two years BNR prepared for national uprising in Belarus and ceased the preparations only when the League of Nations recognised the western borders of the Soviet Union on March 15, 1923.

== Resistance in World War II ==
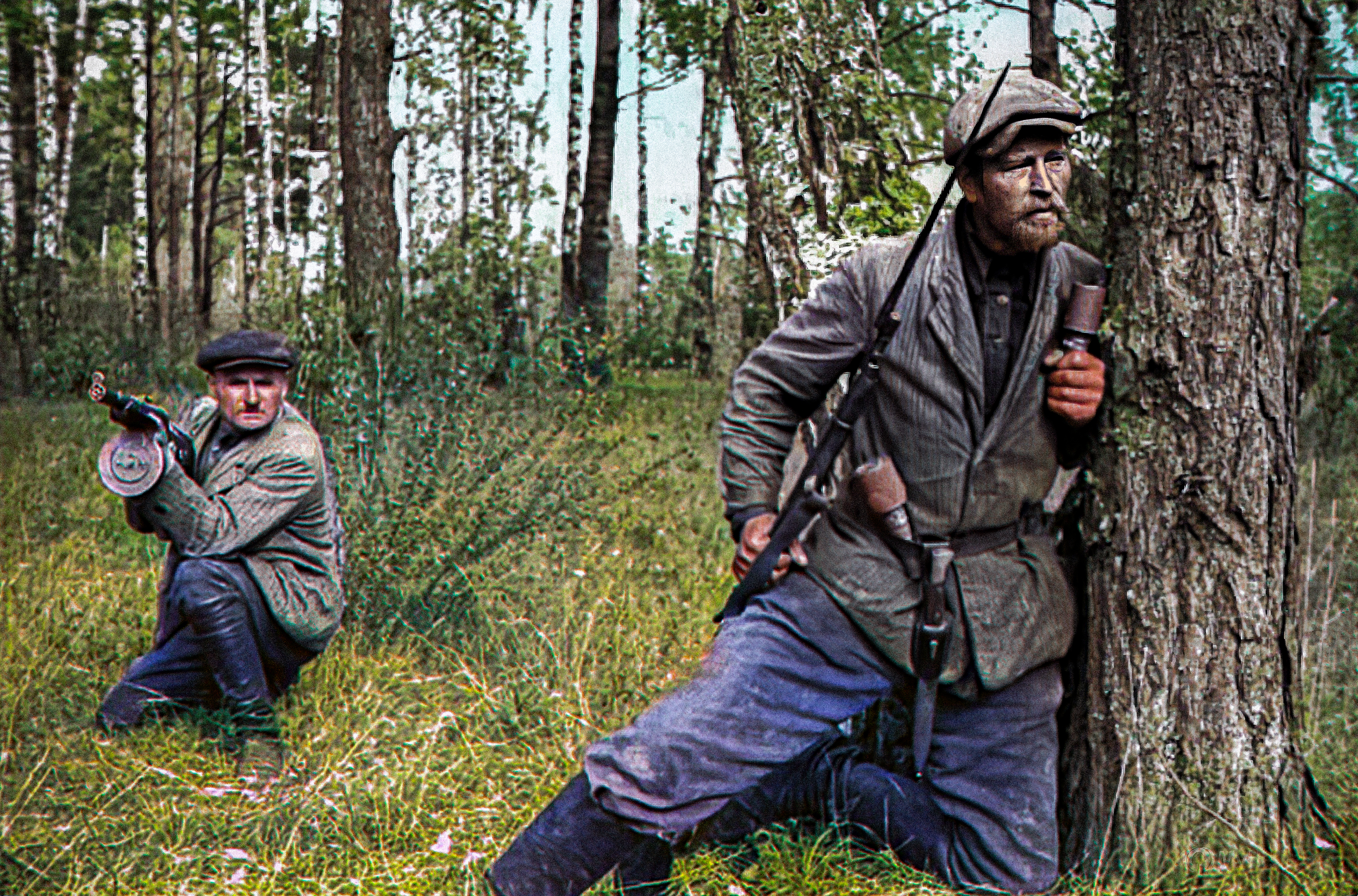
Belarusian partisans near Połock, 1943. The partisan on the left is carrying what appears to be a Soviet PPD-40. His companion is equipped with a Mosin–Nagant rifle, a German bayonet and two RGD-33 hand grenades.

When the Soviet Union invaded Poland on September 17, 1939, following the terms of the Molotov–Ribbentrop Pact's secret protocol, much of what had been eastern Poland was annexed to the BSSR. Similarly to the times of German occupation during World War I, Belarusian language and Soviet culture enjoyed relative prosperity in this short period. Already in October 1940, over 75% of schools used the Belarusian language, also in the regions where no Belarusian people lived, e.g. around Łomża, there was Ruthenization. After twenty months of Soviet rule, Germany and its Axis allies invaded the Soviet Union on June 22, 1941. Soviet authorities immediately evacuated about 20% of the population of Belarus and destroyed all the food supplies. The country suffered particularly heavily during the fighting and the German occupation. Following bloody encirclement battles, all of the present-day Belarus territory was occupied by the Germans by the end of August 1941.

During World War II, the Nazis attempted to establish a puppet Belarusian government, Belarusian Central Rada, with the symbolics similar to BNR. In reality, however, the Germans imposed a brutal racist regime, burning down some 9 000 Belarusian villages, deporting some 380,000 people for slave labour, and killing hundreds of thousands of civilians more. Local police took part in many of those crimes. Almost the whole, previously very numerous, Jewish populations of Belarus that did not evacuate was killed. One of the first uprisings of a Jewish ghetto against the Nazis occurred in 1942 in Belarus, in the small town of Lakhva.

Since the early days of the occupation, a powerful and increasingly well-coordinated Belarusian resistance movement emerged. Hiding in the woods and swamps, the partisans inflicted heavy damage to German supply lines and communications, disrupting railway tracks, bridges, telegraph wires, attacking supply depots, fuel dumps and transports and ambushing German soldiers. Not all anti-German partisans were pro-Soviet. In a partisan sabotage action during the Second World War, the so-called Osipowicze diversion of July 30, 1943, four German trains with supplies and Tiger tanks were destroyed. To fight partisan activity, the Germans had to withdraw considerable forces behind their front line. On June 22, 1944, the huge Soviet offensive Operation Bagration was launched, finally regaining all of Belarus by the end of August. Hundred thousand of Poles were expelled after 1944. As part of the Nazis' effort to combat the enormous Belarusian resistance during World War II, special units of local collaborationists were trained by the SS's Otto Skorzeny to infiltrate the Soviet rear. In 1944 thirty Belarusians (known as Čorny Kot (black cat) and personally led by Michał Vituška) were airdropped by the Luftwaffe behind the lines of the Red Army, which had already liberated Belarus during Operation Bagration. They experienced some initial success due to disorganization in the rear of the Red Army, and some other German-trained Belarusian nationalist units also slipped through the Białowieża Forest in 1945. The NKVD, however, had already infiltrated these units.

In total, Belarus lost a quarter of its pre-war population in World War II, including practically all its intellectual elite. About 9 200 villages and 1.2 million houses were destroyed. The major towns of Minsk and Vitebsk lost over 80% of their buildings and city infrastructure. For the defence against the Germans, and the tenacity during the German occupation, the capital Minsk was awarded the title Hero City after the war. The fortress of Brest, Belarus was awarded the title Hero-Fortress.

== See also ==
- Polish resistance movement
- Lithuanian resistance movement
- Kościuszko Uprising
- Belarusian partisan movement (2020–present)
- Rail war in Belarus (2022–present)
