= Listovoye, Chernyakhovsky District, Kaliningrad Oblast =

Listovoye Листовое
- Abandoned village
- Location within Kaliningrad Oblast
- Coordinates: 54°30′23″N 21°36′11″E
- Country: Russia
- Federal subject: Kaliningrad Oblast
- District: Chernyakhovsky District

Listovoye (Russian: Листовое) was a rural locality (a (village) in the Chernyakhovsky District of Kaliningrad Oblast, Russia. It is not to be confused with the settlement Listovoye in Zelenogradsky District.

== History ==
Initially, the settlement was called Stagutschen and was a rural community near the city of Insterburg in the administrative district of Gumbinnen in East Prussia. Since 1874, Stagutschen belonged to the Jodlauken district (since 1938 the Schwalbental).

In 1938, for political and ideological reasons, the settlement was renamed Dallwitz. At the same time, the camp of the Imperial Labor Service was established in Dalvitz, and a railway station was built on the Toruń-Chernyakhovsk line leading to Insterburg. In July 1944, the Dallwitz Airborne Battalion, named after this settlement, was created in the Imperial Service camp. After World War II, the settlement in 1947 was renamed Listovoye and transferred to the Svobodnensky rural settlement.

By 1976, the Listovoye was completely abandoned by the inhabitants.
