= Belarusian Home Defence =

Axis collaborationist military force in Belarus

- Беларуская краёвая абарона Bielaruskaja krajovaja abarona
- Emblem of the BKA
- Active: February 23, 1944 – April 28, 1945
- Country: Reichskommissariat Ostland
- Allegiance: Belarusian Central Council; Nazi Germany
- Size: 28,000 troops
- Patron: Radasłaŭ Astroŭski
- Anniversaries: February 23
- Engagements: Nazi security warfare

Commanders
- Notable commanders: Barys Rahula; Francišak Kušal; Ivan Yermachenka

The Belarusian Home Defence, or Belarusian Home Guard (Belarusian: Беларуская краёвая абарона, romanized: Biełaruskaja krajovaja abarona, BKA; German: Weißruthenische Heimwehr) were collaborationist volunteer battalions formed by the Belarusian Central Council (1943–1944), a pro-Nazi Belarusian self-government within Reichskommissariat Ostland during World War II. The BKA operated from February 23, 1944, to April 28, 1945. The 20,000 strong Belarusian Home Defence Force was formed under the leadership of Commissioner-General Curt von Gottberg, with logistical help from the German SS-Sonderbataillon Dirlewanger, commanded by Oskar Dirlewanger.

== Creation ==
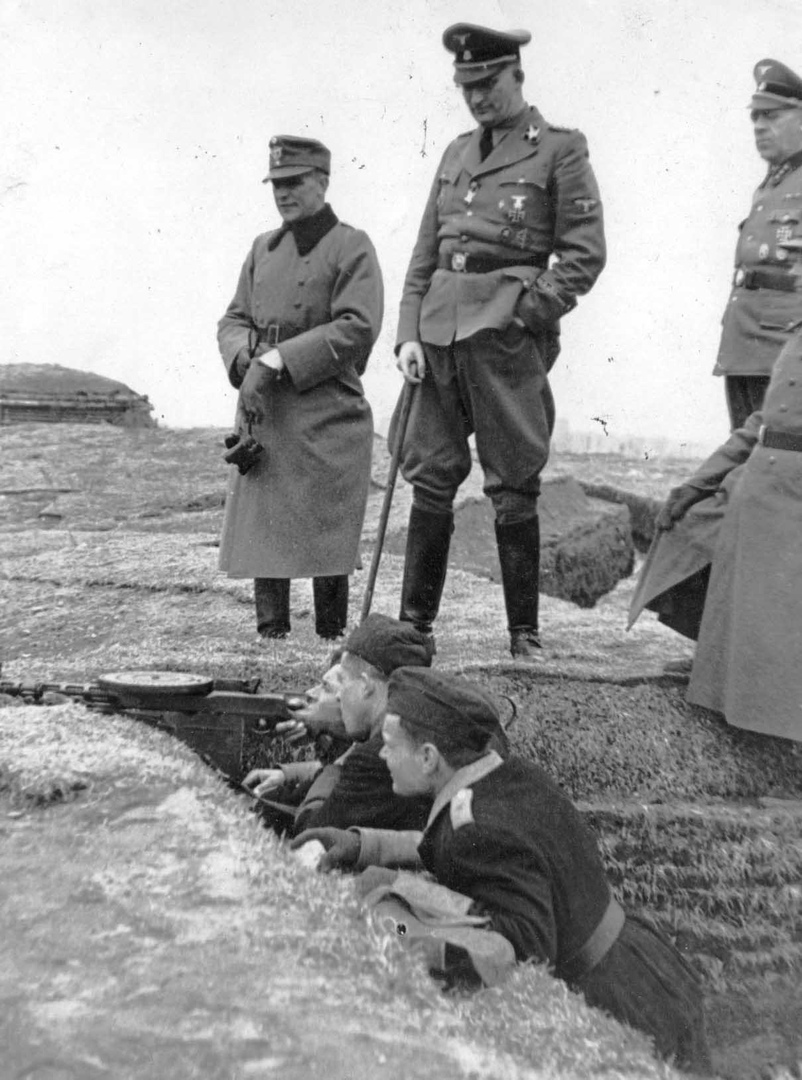
Curt von Gottberg (with walking stick) and collaborators from the Belarusian Home Defence (1944).

After the Wehrmacht suffered two major strategic defeats at Stalingrad (in February 1943) and at Kursk (in August 1943) the Germans made some concessions to the Belarusian collaborators by proposing a Belarusian quasi-state. Assistance was offered by the local administrative governments from the Soviet era, and former members of public organizations including the Soviet Belarusian Youth.

On March 6, 1944, the general mobilization of all healthy men born between 1908 and 1924 into the BKA started. Some 40,000 individuals reported to recruitment bureaus set up in seven cities; although 30% of them were sent back home on German orders for overcrowding. From each region (Uezd) about 500 to 600 men were recruited, for the total of 28,000 soldiers ready for training.

On March 26, all men already enlisted to the BKA gave their oath at Freedom Square in Minsk:

"I swear, that arm to arm with the German soldier, I will not lay down my weapons until there is peace and security in our farms and cities, until in our land the last enemy of the Belarusian people is destroyed."

The oath was accepted by the BKA commander Ivan Yermachenka, in the presence of the SS and Police Leader Curt von Gottberg. The president of the Belarusian Central Council, Radasłaŭ Astroŭski, had concerns that some Soviet partisans might have infiltrated the new BKA structures and that therefore it would need a thorough inspection afterwards.

On March 31, 1944, the BKA battalions received their individual designations. In total, there were 45 battalions formed, mostly infantry. However, to prevent possible staged desertions to "forest people" weapons were handed out only during training exercises with nothing to spare. The German SS didn't have enough officers to train all of them, therefore a few thousand members of the Belarusian Auxiliary Police, not older than 57 years and Unteroffiziers not older than 55 years of age (except those protecting the collaborationist government), were brought into the fold of the BKA. Organization was controlled by the German Police and SD commandants.

In mid-June 1944 an officer school for BKA volunteers was started by the German SS in Minsk, but the city was overrun by the Soviets only two weeks later. After evacuating the council to Königsberg and soon to Berlin in November 1944 along with its upper echelon, the 1st personnel battalion was formed. Meanwhile, BKA battalions on Belarusian territory were mainly used in anti-partisan operations and later at the front against the Red Army.

== Dissolution ==
The BKA ceased to exist after the Red Army regained control in the Byelorussian SSR. Some BKA units retreated to the West and became the base for the creation of the Schutzmannschaft-Brigade Siegling. Many conscripts quietly went back home to their Belarusian villages.

The BCR existed until the late 1980s in the United States and president Radasłaŭ Astroŭski worked with it till 1960. Most of its members, as members of other organizations, received political asylum as immigrants. In April and May 1945, most of the BKA and SBM submitted to the Russian Liberation Army and surrendered to the western Allies. Later propagandists hold that the Belarusian Liberation Armies 1st personnel battalion in Berlin was in fact a reserve for the 30th Waffen Grenadier Division of the SS (2nd Russian). Eleven its officers, including Barys Rahula and others entered the 1st Grenadier Sturm Brigade SS "Belarus", formed in Nazi Germany; it was sent to the Battle of Monte Cassino, and acted against the II Corps (Poland) of General Władysław Anders (Anders Army). BKA soldiers were not trusted by the Germans, which explains why Russian Liberation Army formations weren't sent to the Eastern Front, and combat at Western Front.

== Rank insignia ==
=== Commissioned officer ranks ===
The rank insignia of commissioned officers.

Rank group	General/flag officers	Senior officers			Junior officers
Belarusian Home Defence
Belarusian Home Defence		Палкоўнік; Palkoŭnik	Падпалкоўнік; Padpalkoŭnik	Маёр; Major	Капітан; Kapitan	Старшы лейтэнант Staršy liejtenant	Лейтэнант; Liejtenant

=== Other ranks ===
The rank insignia of non-commissioned officers and enlisted personnel.

Rank group	Non-commissioned officers					Enlisted
Belarusian Home Defence
Belarusian Home Defence	Сьцяжны; Ściažny	Старшыня; Staršyna	Зьвязны; Źviazny	Дружыновы; Družynny	Старшы стралец Staršy straliec	Стралец; Straliec

== See also ==
- Byelorussia in World War II
- Byelorussian collaboration with Nazi Germany
- German occupation of Byelorussia during World War II
- Schutzmannschaft
- The Holocaust in Belarus
- Waffen-SS foreign volunteers and conscripts
- Wehrmacht foreign volunteers and conscripts
