= German occupation of Byelorussia during World War II =

Nazi occupation of Belarus during World War II

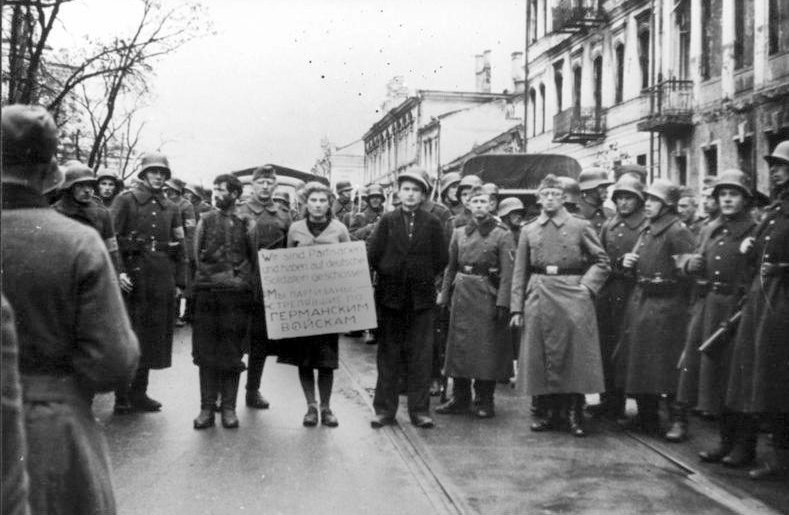
Masha Bruskina with fellow resistance members before public execution. Minsk, October 1941

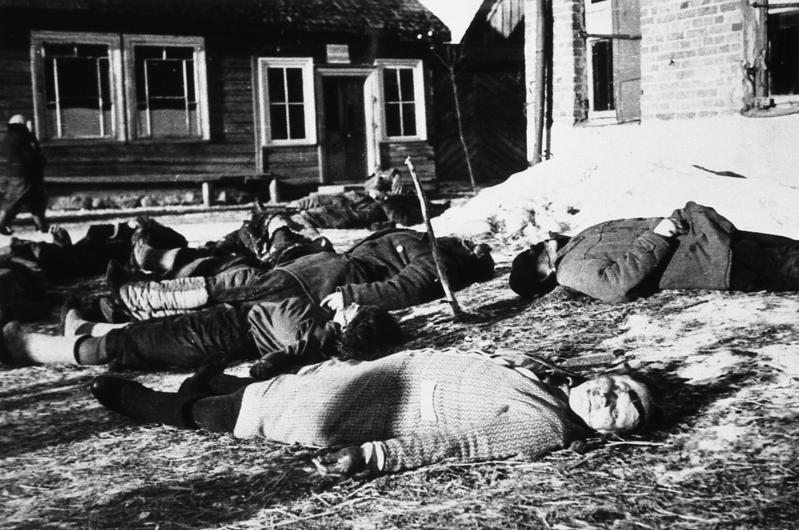
Mass murder of Belarusian civilians near Minsk, 1943

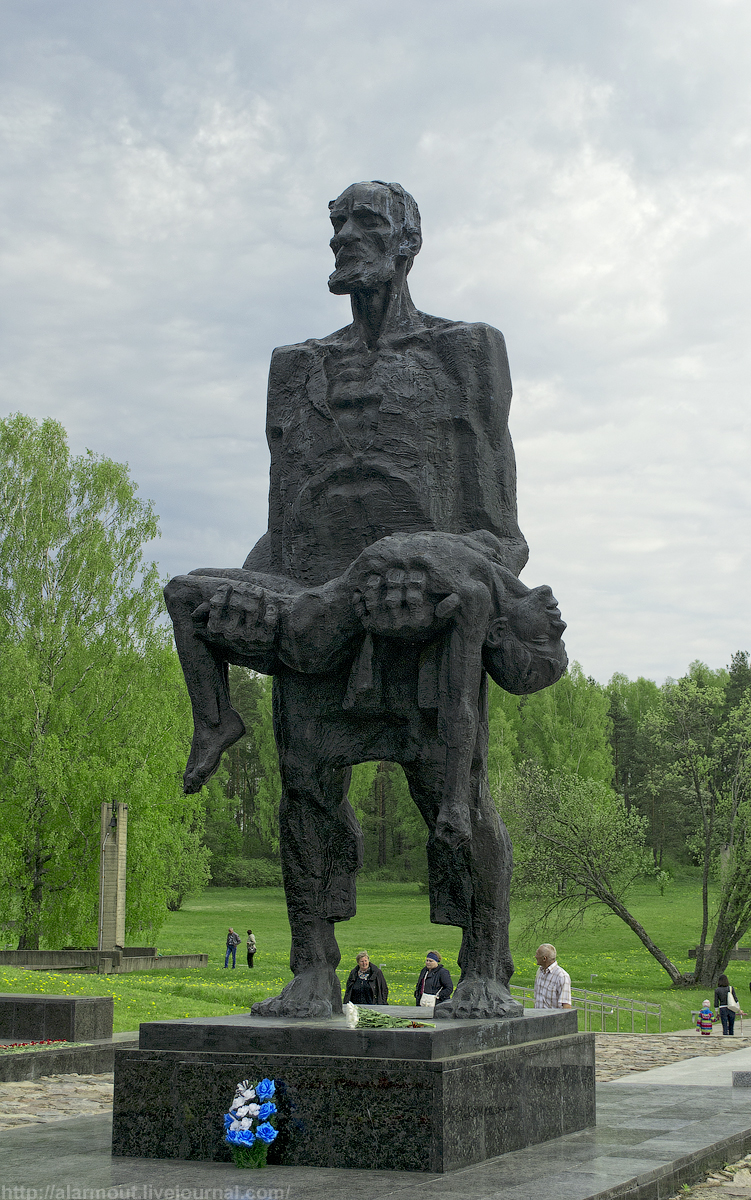
Memorial to the 1943 Khatyn massacre

The German invasion of the Soviet Union during World War II started on 22 June 1941 and led to a German military occupation of Byelorussia until it was fully liberated in August 1944 as a result of Operation Bagration. The western parts of Byelorussia became part of the Reichskommissariat Ostland in 1941, and in 1943, the German authorities allowed local collaborators to set up a regional government, the Belarusian Central Rada, that lasted until Soviet Union reestablished control over the region.

Altogether, more than 2,000,000 people were killed in Belarus during the three years of Nazi occupation, around 25% of the region's population, or even as high as 3,000,000 killed or 30% of the population, including 500,000 to 550,000 Jews as part of the Holocaust in Belarus, with an estimation that 1 in 3 Belarusians died during WW2. In total, on the territory of modern Belarus, more than 9,200 villages and settlements, and 682,000 buildings were destroyed and burned, with some settlements burned several times. By the end of the war, Belarus had lost half of its population as a result of death and moving, the worst of any European state.

== Background ==
The Soviet and Belarusian historiographies study the subject of German occupation in the context of contemporary Belarus, regarded as the Byelorussian Soviet Socialist Republic (BSSR), a constituent republic of the Soviet Union in the 1941 borders as a whole. Polish historiography insists on special, even separate treatment for the East Lands of the Poland in the 1921 borders (alias "Kresy Wschodnie" alias West Belarus), which were incorporated into the BSSR after the Soviet Union invaded Poland on 17 September 1939. More than 100,000 people of different ethnic backgrounds, mostly Poles and Jews in West Belarus, were imprisoned, executed or transported to the eastern USSR by Soviet authorities before the German invasion. The NKVD (Soviet secret police) killed more than 1,000 prisoners in June and July 1941, for example, in Chervyen.

== Invasion ==
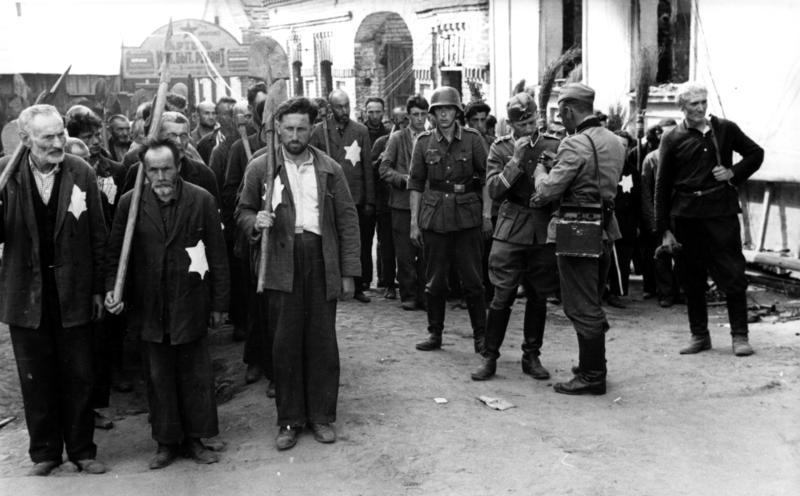
Mogilev Jews assembled for forced labour, July 1941

After twenty months of Soviet rule in Western Belarus and Western Ukraine, Nazi Germany and its Axis allies invaded the Soviet Union on 22 June 1941. Eastern Belarus suffered particularly heavily during the fighting and German occupation. Following bloody encirclement battles, all of the present-day Belarus territory was occupied by the Germans by the end of August 1941. With Poland regarding the Soviet annexation as illegal, the majority of Polish citizens did not ask for Soviet citizenship from 1939 to 1941, and as a result were Polish citizens under Soviet and later German occupation.

== Occupation ==
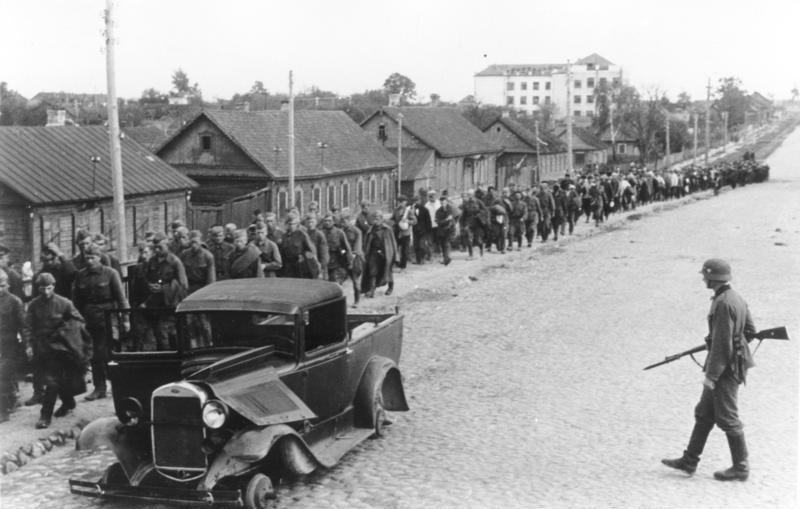
A column of Soviet POWs captured near Minsk is marched west

In the early days of the occupation, a powerful and increasingly well-coordinated Soviet partisan movement emerged. Hiding in the woods and swamps, the partisans inflicted heavy damage to German supply lines and communications, disrupting railway tracks, bridges, telegraph wires, attacking supply depots, fuel dumps and transports, and ambushing Axis soldiers. In one of the most successful partisan sabotage actions of the entire Second World War, the so-called Asipovichy diversion of 30 July 1943, four German trains with supplies and Tiger tanks were destroyed. To fight partisan activity, the Germans had to withdraw considerable forces behind their front line. On 22 June 1944, the huge Soviet Strategic Offensive Operation Bagration was launched, finally regaining all of Belarus by the end of August.

== War crimes ==
The German invasion and occupation resulted in heavy human casualties, with some 380,000 people deported for slave labour, and the mass murder of hundreds of thousands more civilians. The ethnically Slavic Byelorussian population was intended to be exterminated, expelled, or enslaved as part of the German ethnic cleansing operation named Generalplan Ost. At least 5,295 Byelorussian settlements were destroyed by the Nazis and had some or all their inhabitants killed (out of 9,200 settlements that were burned or otherwise destroyed in Belarus during World War II), and more than 600 villages like Khatyn had their entire population annihilated.

=== Partisan war ===
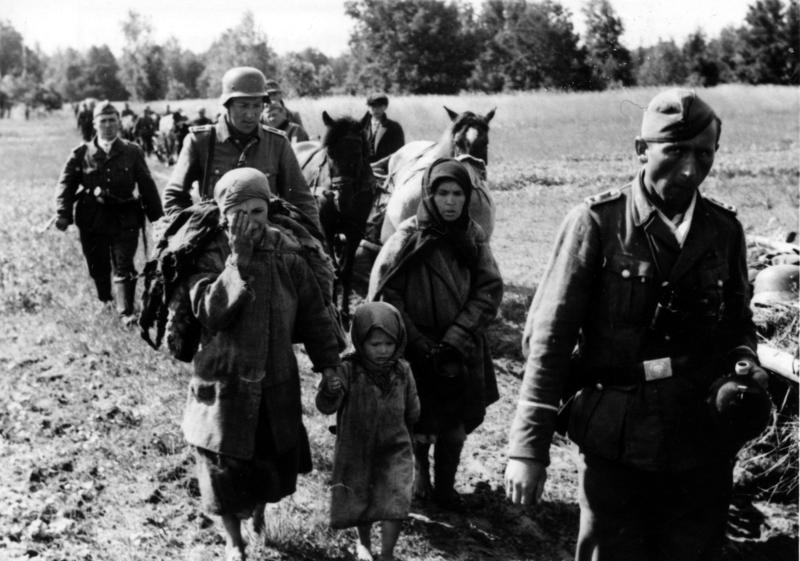
Battle group Walter Schimana, summer, 1943

Some historians have argued that Soviet partisans deliberately provoked German reprisals, partly accounting for the high death toll. However, this conclusion has been disputed and a 2017 study focusing on the logistics of mass killing found "that Soviet partisan attacks against German personnel provoked reprisals against civilians but that attacks against railroads had the opposite effect. Where partisans focused on disrupting German supply lines rather than killing Germans, occupying forces conducted fewer reprisals, burned fewer houses, and killed fewer people."

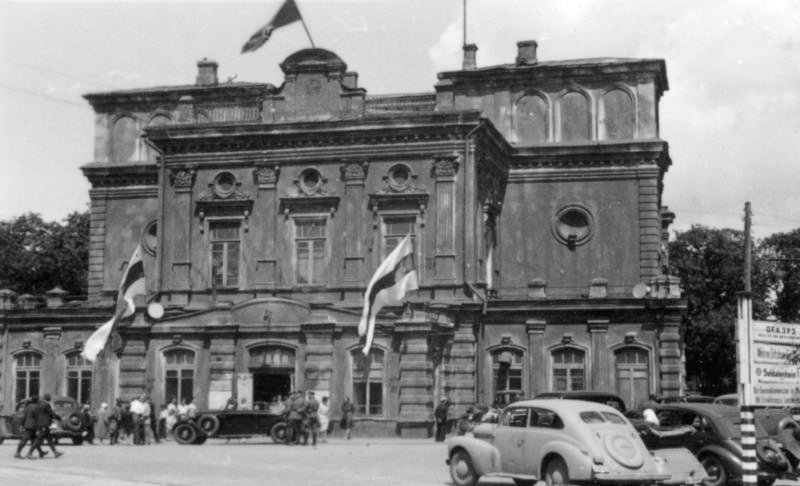
Belarusian Central Rada, Minsk, June 1943.

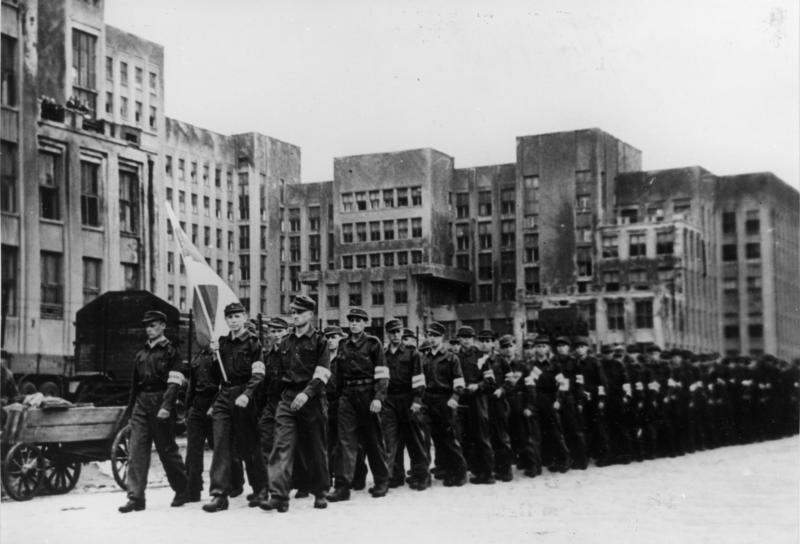
On the way to the railway station in Minsk young people from Belarus march past the chairman of the Belarusian Central Council, Professor Radasłaŭ Astroŭski. They are going to be trained in Germany for military action, Minsk, June 1944.

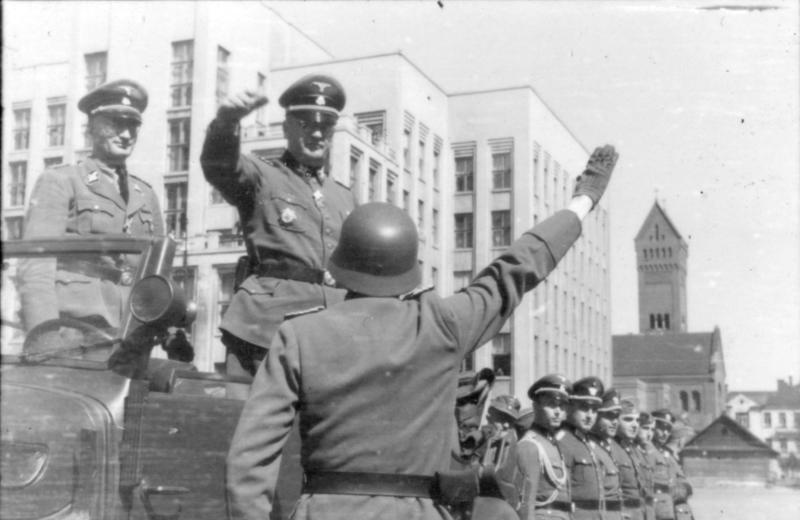
Erich von dem Bach-Zelewski and Ordnungspolizei, Minsk, ca. 1943

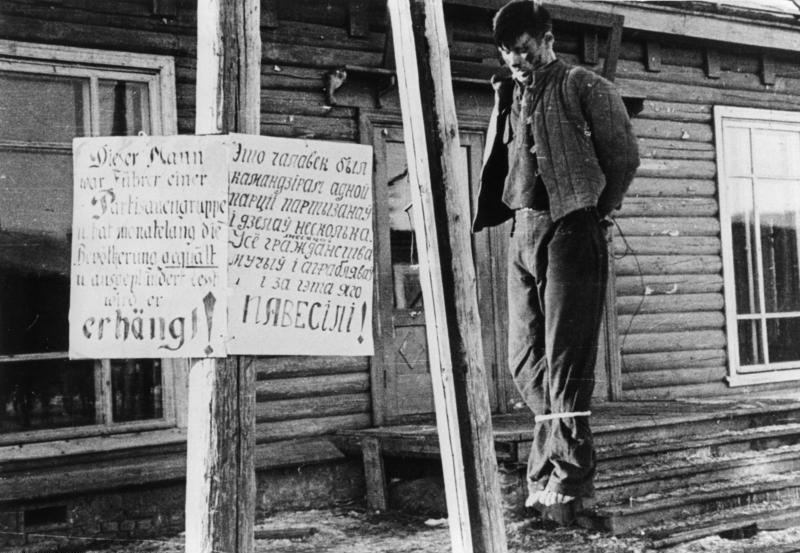
A hanged Belarusian resistance member, Minsk, 1942/1943.

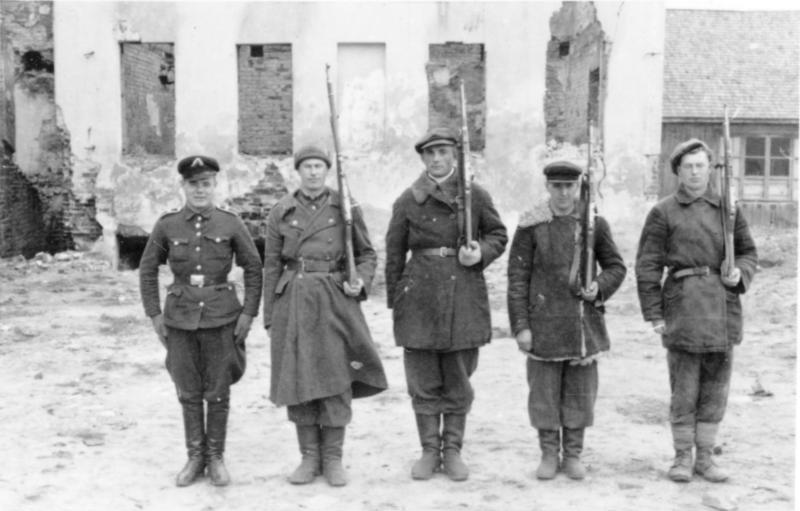
Belarusian Auxiliary Police, Mohylew, March 1943.

=== Nazi units ===
- 14th Waffen Grenadier Division of the SS Galicia (1st Ukrainian)
- 29th Waffen Grenadier Division of the SS RONA (1st Russian)
- 30th Waffen Grenadier Division of the SS (1st Belarusian)
- 30th Waffen Grenadier Division of the SS (2nd Russian)
- 36th Waffen Grenadier Division of the SS
- Einsatzgruppen
- Ukrainian Auxiliary Police
- Byelorussian Auxiliary Police

=== Notable Nazi personnel ===
- Erich von dem Bach-Zelewski
- Gustavs Celmiņš
- Oskar Dirlewanger
- Curt von Gottberg
- Konrāds Kalējs
- Bronislav Kaminski
- Wilhelm Kube
- Anthony Sawoniuk
- Karl Schäfer
- Jakob Sporrenberg

=== Other units and participants ===
- Army Group Centre

== Holocaust ==
The largest Jewish ghetto in Soviet Belarus before the conclusion of World War II was the Minsk Ghetto, created by the Germans shortly after the invasion began. Almost the whole, previously numerous Jewish population of Belarus which did not evacuate east ahead of the German advance was killed during the Holocaust by bullet. The list of eradicated Jewish ghettos in Nazi-Soviet occupied Poland extending eastward toward the border with the Soviet Belarus can be found at the Jewish ghettos in German-occupied Poland article.

== Aftermath ==
Later in 1944, 30 German-trained Belarusians were airdropped behind the Soviet front line to spark disarray. These were known as "Čorny Kot" ("Black Cat") led by Michał Vituška. They had some initial success due to disorganization in the rear guard of Red Army. Other Belarusian units slipped through Białowieża Forest and full scale guerrilla war erupted in 1945. The NKVD infiltrated these units and neutralized them by the end of 1946.

In total, Belarus lost a quarter of its pre-war population in the Second World War, including practically all its intellectual elite. About 9,200 villages and 1,200,000 houses were destroyed. The major towns of Minsk and Vitebsk lost over 80% of their buildings and city infrastructure. For the defense against the Germans, and the tenacity during the German occupation, the capital Minsk was awarded the title Hero City after the war. The fortress of Brest was awarded the title Hero-Fortress.

== See also ==
- Eastern Front (World War II)
- Khatyn massacre: slaughter of Belarus civilians
- Maly Trostenets extermination camp
- Military history of Belarus during World War II
- Operation Tempest
- Narodowe Siły Zbrojne
- Slutsk Affair
- Soviet partisan
- Territories of Poland annexed by the Soviet Union
- Come and See
- Fortress of War

=== People ===
- Radasłaŭ Astroŭski
- Pyotr Masherov
- Michał Vituška
