= Vincent Hadleŭski =

Belarusian Roman Catholic priest and politician

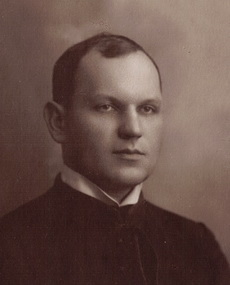
Vincent Hadleŭski

Vincent Hadleŭski (Belarusian: Вінцэнт Гадлеўскі, Polish: Wincenty Godlewski; November 16, 1888 – December 24, 1942) was a Belarusian Roman Catholic priest, publicist and politician. During World War II he was arrested by the German police on December 24, 1942, and executed in Maly Trostenets extermination camp.

== Life ==
Born in the village of Porozowo, (now Šuryčy in the Grodno Region near Vaŭkavysk), he graduated from a Catholic seminary in Vilnius and the Catholic academy in St.Petersburg. He was one of the first priests to introduce Catholic liturgy in the Belarusian language.

After the short-lived declaration of independence by Belarus, he became member of the founding government (Rada) of the Belarusian Democratic Republic for several months in 1918. Hadleŭski was one of the participants in the First Belarusian Congress of December 1917, and served as editor of the magazine Krynica.

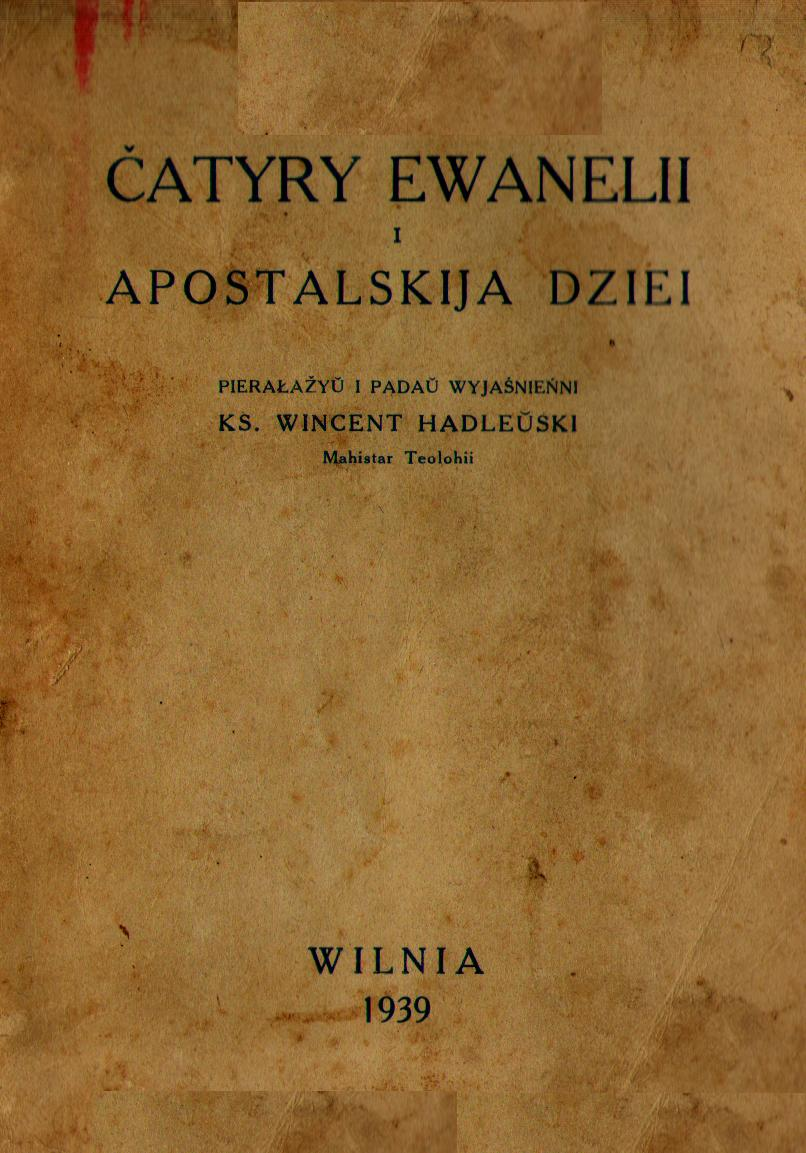
Čatyry Ewanelii cover translated by Vincent Hadleŭski

=== Second Polish Republic ===
Following the Peace of Riga, signed in 1921 between newly reborn Poland and Soviet Russia, Hadleŭski settled in what became eastern Poland. He became professor in the Belarusian seminary of Nieśwież (now Niaśviž, Belarus) and a priest for the powiat of Święciany (now Švenčionys, Lithuania). For seven years between 1922 and 1928 he served as member of parliament for the Polish Sejm, representing the Belarusian minority.

In 1925 and 1926 Hadleŭski was arrested and questioned twice for organizing anti-Polish rallies. He was arrested for the third time and convicted of anti-Polish agitation in 1927. Allegedly, the evidence against Hadleŭski was falsified by his opponents. His active promotion of Belarusian language and independence earned him a two-year jail sentence. While in prison, he wrote a book about the history of the New Testament for Belarusian schools (the book was published in Vilnius in 1930). After his release he lived in Vilnius, where he translated the New Testament into Belarusian.

=== Invasion of Poland ===
In 1939–1940 he edited the collaborationist magazine Bielaruski front and established the Belarusian Independence Party. Hadleŭski's ideology was right-wing conservative and Christian, while most followers of Belarusian nationalism at that time were Marxists, for example, the Belarusian Peasants' and Workers' Union and later the Communist Party of West Belarus.

In June 1940 Vincent Hadleŭski moved to Warsaw where he worked at the German-organized Belarusian Committee. In October 1941 he became chief scholarly inspector of Minsk and organized education processes in the city's primary schools. While doing that, he kept on promoting the idea of Belarusian political independence and organized illegal activity of the Belarusian Independence Party, that later even worked on an anti-German uprising in Minsk.

On December 24, 1942 Vincent Hadleŭski was arrested by the Gestapo and shot in Maly Trostenets extermination camp.
