= Belarusian Central Council =

Puppet government of Nazi Germany in Reichskommissariat Ostland

- Weißruthenischer Zentralrat; Беларуская цэнтральная рада

- Flag of local administration

Council overview
- Formed: 1 March 1943 (83 years ago)
- Dissolved: 2 July 1944 (82 years ago)
- Jurisdiction: Generalbezirk Weißruthenien
- Headquarters: Minsk, Belarus
- Council executives: Hinrich Lohse, Reichskommissar; Curt von Gottberg, Generalkommissar; Radasłaŭ Astroŭski, President
- Parent Council: Reich Ministry for the Occupied Eastern Territories

Map
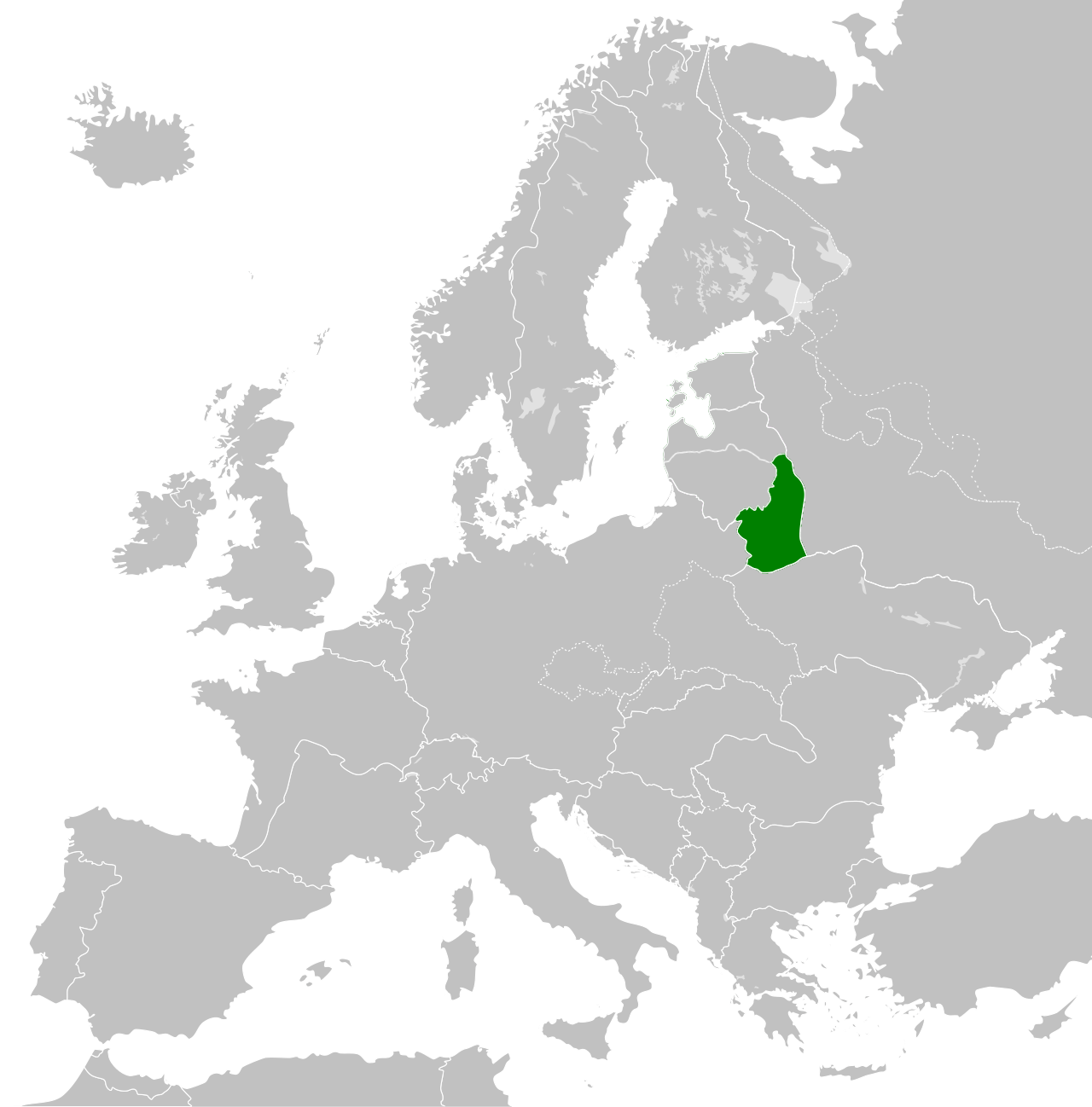

The Belarusian Central Council (Belarusian: Беларуская цэнтральная рада, romanized: Biełaruskaja centralnaja rada; German: Weißruthenischer Zentralrat) was a puppet government in Reichskommissariat Ostland during World War II. It was established by Nazi Germany within Reichskommissariat Ostland in 1943–44, following requests by collaborationist Belarusian politicians hoping to create a Belarusian state with German support.

== Background ==
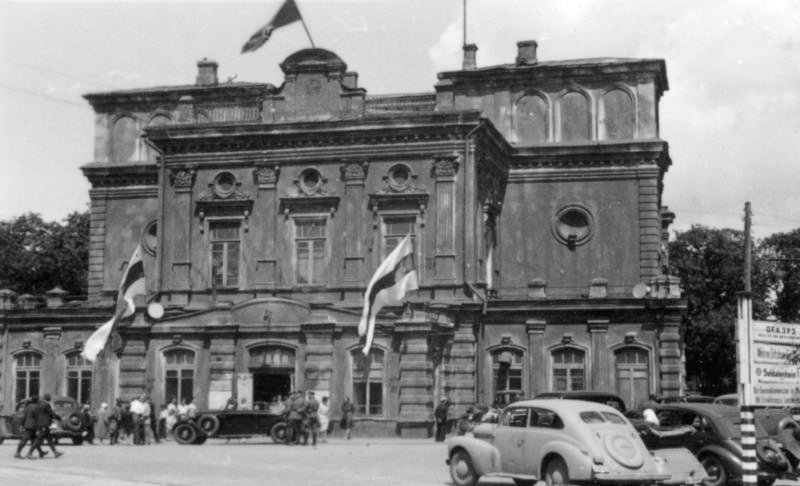
The Rada in Minsk, June 1943.

Immediately after the 1941 German invasion of the Soviet Union, the mass persecution of Jews by the forward units of Einsatzgruppe B began under the command of the SS functionary Arthur Nebe. Jews were massacred and ghettos were formed in dozens of towns with the participation of Belarusian collaborators who were given various prominent roles. The Belarusian Auxiliary Police was established and deployed to murder operations particularly in February–March 1942.

The Generalbezirk Weißruthenien district of RKO was soon formed. The district included the western and central parts of the Belarusian Soviet Socialist Republic in its 1941 borders (which included the towns of Hlybokaye, Vileyka, Navahrudak and other territories earlier annexed by the USSR from Poland). In 1942, the German civil authority was extended to Minsk, Slutsk and Barysaw. The area was to be made part of the Nazis' project of Lebensraum ("living space"), in which those deemed non-Aryan would be exterminated or expelled to make way for German colonists, while the remaining locals would be subject to forced Germanization. All attempts by the Belarusian representatives to request self-governance for the occupied Belarus led to German repressions against those who voiced such requests.

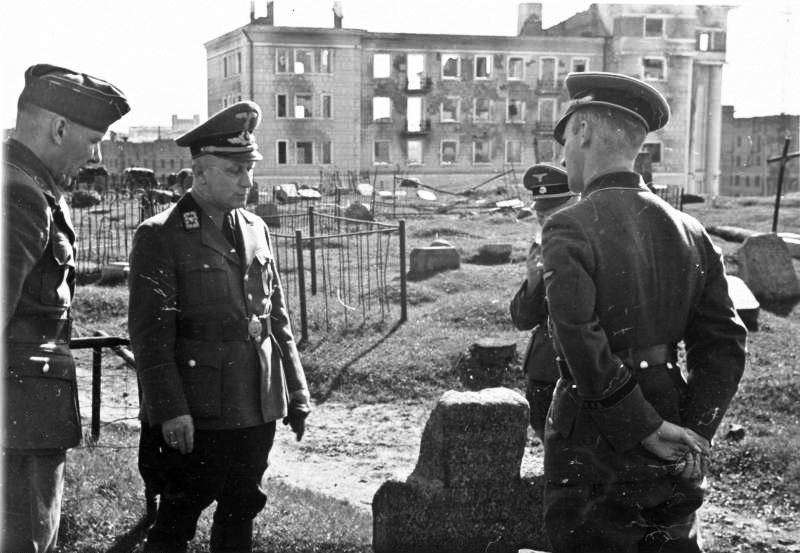
Wilhelm Kube in Minsk, May 1943

A Nazi politician Wilhelm Kube was appointed the German administrator of the area (Generalkommissar). He had his command center established in Minsk with a second Kommissar in Baranovichi. In September 1943, Kube was killed by his Belarusian housemaid, Yelena Mazanik, who planted a bomb in his bed.

In order to drum up fresh troops for the front inside Reichskommissariat Ostland and to stimulate support from the Belarusian population and elites, General Reinhard Gehlen suggested to the German High Command that some concessions be made to the Belarusian collaborators in the form of a puppet state. The "semi-autonomous" local government was established by Nazi Germany in December 1943, and named the Belarusian Central Council. Radasłaŭ Astroŭski, the mayor of Smolensk at that time, was appointed its president. SS-Gruppenführer Kurt von Gottberg who replaced Kube named the Belarusian politician Ivan Yermachenka, arriving from Prague, the "Advisor on Belarusian affairs".

== Functions and work ==
The Belarusian Central Council only had a limited role in governing, with the key decisions being taken by the German administration of the Generalbezirk Weißruthenien. The Council mostly managed social affairs as well as culture and education. The Council had twelve departments including: Education, science and culture; Propaganda and press; Social security; Finance; Youth affairs; Religion; Control; Administrative issues; Economy; National minorities; and Home Defence.

The Belarusian Central Council oversaw the activities of Belarusian civic organisations established earlier with German permission including: Union of Belarusian Youth; Belarusian Scientific Society; Belarusian Cultural Association; Belarusian Self-Help; and labour unions. The Council managed to widen the usage of the Belarusian language in schools and in public life, worked on the opening of a university.

== Policy on religion ==
The Germans authorised the reformation of the Belarusian Autocephalous Orthodox Church, independent from the Patriarch of Moscow which, similarly, was used by the Soviet atheists to rally Russians against the Germans. The priests had considerable influence with the peasantry and actively supported the defeat of Soviet Russia, which had terrorized Christians in West Belarus after the joint Soviet invasion of Poland of September 17, 1939.

== Belarusian Home Defence ==
In March 1944, the Belarusian Central Council organized a universal military conscription among the young Belarusians. The Belarusian Home Defence (Bielaruskaja Krajovaja Abarona, BKA) was formed, with 28,000 troops ready for training, aided by a few thousand members of the Belarusian Auxiliary Police battalions.

After the retreat of Germans from Belarus, the Belarusian Home Defence was absorbed into the 30th Waffen Grenadier Division of the SS. This infantry division formed from the remnants of the 29th Waffen-SS Division, included both Belarusian and Ukrainian units. The Germans had set up an officers' school and issued uniforms with a Waffen-SS Storm-brigade Belarus designation. Orders were issued for Belarusian forces to be absorbed by Andrey Vlasov's Russian Liberation Army (ROA); but Astroŭski opposed this. He also sabotaged the idea of the "Committee for the Liberation of the Peoples of Russia", since he did not wanted to align himself with Russians.

Other members of BKA and the Belarusian Auxiliary Police were recruited by SS-Obersturmbannführer Otto Skorzeny for training in Dahlwitz near Berlin, to make special undercover strikes behind the enemy lines. These units were part of a clandestine operation known as Liebes Kätzchen stretched from the Baltics to the Black Sea. The Belarusian "Black Cat" guerrilla group was led by Michas' Vitushka. They operated in Belavezha Forest (Białowieża) against the Soviet forces in anti-communist operations throughout 1945 but with little success. Infiltrated by the NKVD, they were destroyed in 1945.

== Exile ==
In 1944, with the advance of the Red Army towards the west, the Belarusian Central Council evacuated with the retreating Germans to East Prussian and Polish lands still under the control of Nazi Germany.

On June 27, 1944, a few days before the evacuation, the BCR held a congress in Minsk, titled the Second All-Belarusian Congress, sanctioned by Gottberg. The meeting gathered 1,039 delegates from various regions of Belarus and from Belarusian emigre organizations, with German officials among them. Representatives of the SS observed the proceedings from a balcony. The congress confirmed the declaration of independence of Belarus (as the Belarusian People's Republic) and declared the Belarusian Central Council as the only legitimate representative body of the Belarusian people and the successor of the Rada of the BNR. Members of the Council reaffirmed their commitment to the Third Reich and personally to Adolf Hitler. The aim of the meeting was for the BCR to gain legitimacy based on a decision by representatives of Belarusian society rather than by the German administration. The organizers feared provocations from both Soviet partisans and the Germans.

After evacuation, the leadership of the BCR formed the base for Belarusian self-organization in the post-war camps for displaced persons. Even after the evacuation, the BCR continued to receive orders from the Reich Ministry for the Occupied Eastern Territories. After the end of the war, the BCR entered the Anti-Bolshevik Bloc of Nations. At the end of 1945, Astroŭski held a special meeting of the "Belarusian Central Committee" which decided to temporarily suspend (but not to dissolve) the government-in-exile in order to avoid accusation of collaboration with the Nazis.

On March 25, 1948, the Belarusian Central Council renewed its activity in exile. It was one of the main umbrella organizations of the Belarusian emigre community in the West until its dissolution in April 1995 with the death of its last members.

== Presidents ==
- Radasłaŭ Astroŭski (1943 — 1945 and 1948 — 1976)
- Nikandar Miadziejka (1977 — 1987)
- Michaś Zuj (1988 — 1995)
- Vital Ciarpicki (1995)

== See also ==
- German occupation of Belarus during World War II
- Belarusian collaboration with Nazi Germany
- Belarus in World War II
- Lokot Republic – native Russian state under indirect German control
