= Radasłaŭ Astroŭski =

Belarusian Axis collaborator

- Радаслаў Астроўскі
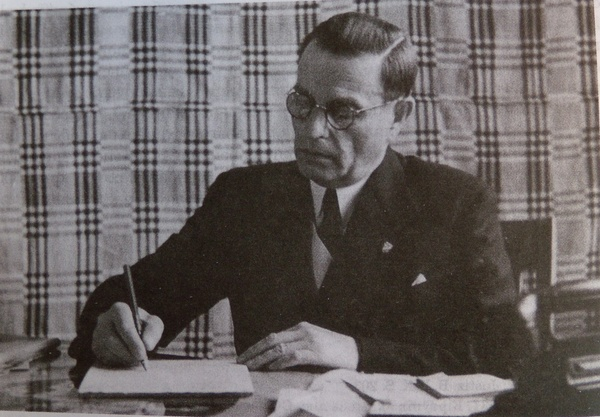

President of the Belarusian Central Council
- In office December 21, 1943 – October 17, 1976
- Preceded by: Position Establishment
- Succeeded by: Nikandar Miadziejka

Personal details
- Born: October 25, 1887 Zapolle, Klyetsk District, Minsk Governorate, Russian Empire
- Died: October 17, 1976 (aged 88) Benton Harbor, Michigan, U.S.
- Occupation: Nationalist political activist and political leader

Radasłaŭ Kazimiravič Astroŭski (Note: Belarusian: Радаслаў Казіміравіч Астроўскі, romanized: Radaslaw Kazimiravich Astrowski; Polish: Radosław Ostrowski; Russian: Радослав Казимирович Островский, romanized: Radoslav Kazimirovich Ostrovsky) (25 October 1887 – 17 October 1976) was a Belarusian collaborator with Nazi Germany who served as the president of the Belarusian Central Council, a puppet Belarusian administration under German hegemony from 1943–1944, and in exile from 1948-1976.

== Early years ==
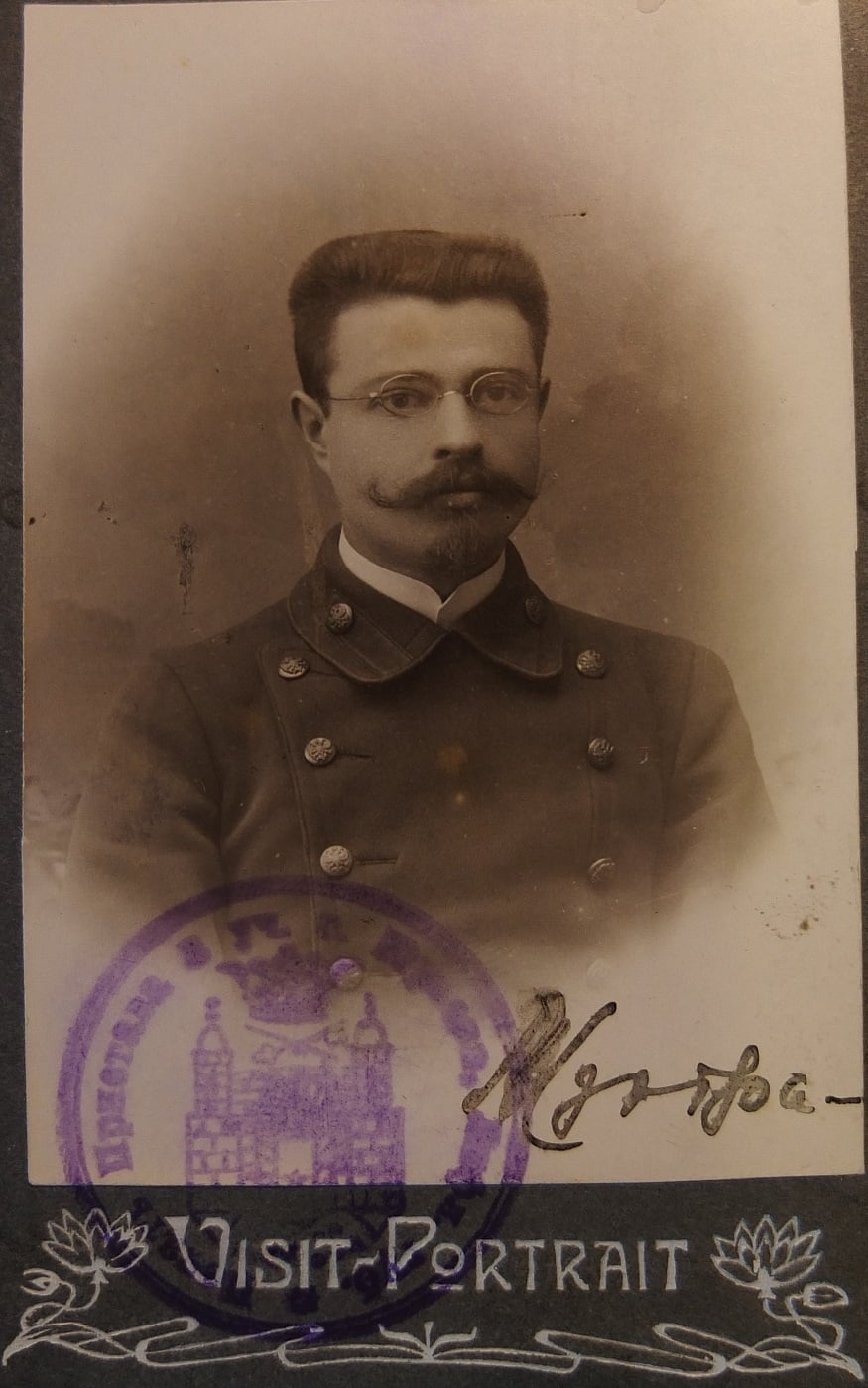
Radasłaŭ Astroŭski (1913)

Radasłaŭ Astroŭski was born on 25 October 1887 in the town of Zapolle, Slutsk Uyezd, Minsk Governorate. He studied at the Slutsk gymnasium, but was expelled for participating in the Russian Revolution of 1905–1907. In 1908, he was accepted to the mathematical faculty of Saint Petersburg University. In 1911, he was arrested for taking part in revolutionary riots and was imprisoned at Saint Petersburg and Pskov. After his release in 1912, he re-entered the university and later transferred to the University of Tartu, from where he graduated with a degree in physics and mathematics.

After University, Astroŭski worked as a teacher in Częstochowa, Poland and in Minsk. From 1915 to 1917, he taught at the Minsk Teaching Institute. After the February Revolution, he became the commissar of the Russian Provisional Government in Slutsk paviet. In September of that same year, he founded the Slutsk Belarusian Gymnasium and became its principal.

Astroŭski opposed the October Revolution. He was a delegate to the December 1917 First All-Belarusian Congress and published articles in support of the idea of Belarusian independence. In 1918, Astroŭski served as the Education Minister in the government of the Belarusian Democratic Republic, under Prime Minister Raman Skirmunt. He also took part in the 1920 Slutsk uprising against the Red Army.

== Political activity in West Belarus ==
In 1921, he moved into West Belarus in the Second Polish Republic. He served as principal of the Belarusian Gymnasium of Vilnia from 1924 to 1936. In the second half of the 1920s, he radically changed his political views. In 1924 he initiated the creation of a Polish-Belarusian Society that supported the Polish government. After the breakdown of the Society, Astroŭski cooperated with the Belarusian Communist Party (of Bolsheviks) and with the Communist Party of West Belarus, and managed the illegal komsomol cell in his gymnasium.

In 1925 and 1926 he was the vice-chairman of the Belarusian Peasants' and Workers' Union, the chairman of the Belarusian School Society, and the principal of the Belarusian Cooperation Bank in Wilno, used to transfer finances to the BPWU. In 1926, Astroŭski joined the Communist Party of West Belarus and was arrested by the Polish police. However, during the trial against the Hramada, he was found not guilty.

From 1928, he again reoriented politically and began advocating for cooperation with Polish officials. For that, he was condemned by many leaders of the Western Belarusian national movement. In the mid-1930s, he published various works in Belarusian calendar books and in the "Rodny Kraj" newspaper, under the pseudonym "Era". In 1936, he had to leave Wilno and moved to Łódź.

== Collaboration with Nazi Germany ==
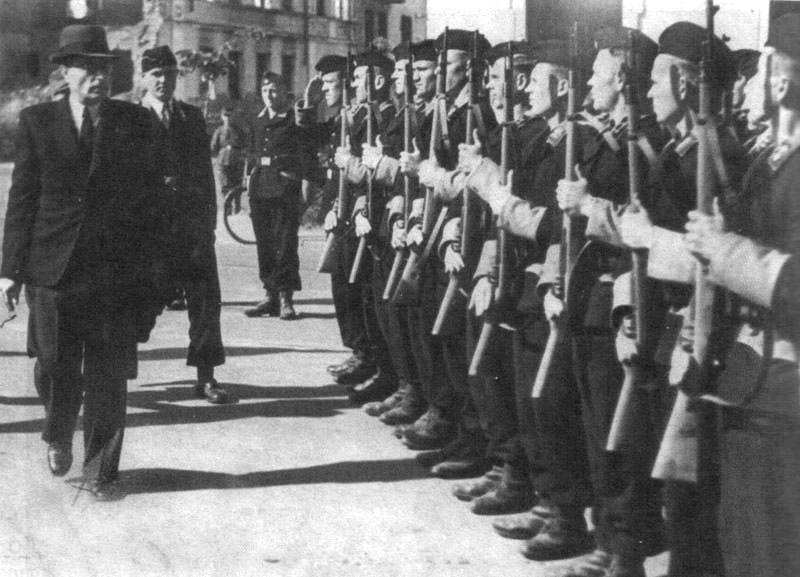
Radasłaŭ Astroŭski inspects Byelorussian Auxiliary Police

During the German occupation of Belarus, Astroŭski actively cooperated with Nazi officials. In 1941 he moved to Minsk and worked in civil administration. He also created Belarusian administrations in Bryansk, Smolensk and Mahilyow and spent certain time as a Bürgermeister in all of those cities.

In 1943, Astroŭski was appointed president of the Belarusian Central Rada, a limited national government whose creation was permitted by the Nazis in a desperate effort to garner sympathy from the Belarusian population and mobilise them as personnel against the advancing Soviet forces on the Eastern Front. Although the Rada practically had little power, it was allowed to manage certain civil issues.

Astroŭski was one of the main organisers of the Second All-Belarusian Congress in 1944.

Astroŭski and his cohorts supported the annihilation of Jews, but had relatively minimal involvement in carrying out the mass murders.

== Life in exile ==
After the war, Astroŭski fled from the Soviets and ended up living in Volksgartenstraße, Langenfeld, Rhineland in West Germany. In 1956, he moved to the United States by way of Argentina and resided in South River, New Jersey. He actively participated in Belarusian national activism abroad, and was the main ideologist of the BCR as the legitimate Belarusian government in exile, thus not admitting such status for the main Belarusian People's Republic Council. Astroŭski became a member of the central committee of the Anti-Bolshevik Bloc of Nations.

== Death ==
Astroŭski died on 17 October 1976 in Benton Harbor, Michigan. He is buried at the Saint Euphrosynia Belarus Orthodox Church Cemetery in South River, New Jersey.
