= April 6 =

April 6 this year in various calendars
- Monday, 6 April 2026
Akan	Nwonadwo
Armenian	20 Ahekani 1475
Aztec	Tlaxochimaco 6, 9 Ocēlōtl
Babylonian	17 Adaru, 2336 SE
Balinese pawukon	Luang, Pepet, Beteng, Laba, Pon, Aryang, Coma of Sinta, Indra, Dangu, Pati
Bengali	23 Chaitro, BS 1432
Chinese	Yang Metal Dog・Heart Mansion; Fire Horse Year, Month 2, Day 19 (Qingming, 14 days until Guyu)
Common Era	6 April 2026 CE
Coptic	28 Paremhat, AM 1742
Egyptian	25 Mesori, 2774 NE
Ethiopian	28 Magābit, 2018 Amätä Məhrät
French Republican	Décade II, Septidi de Germinal de l'Année 234 de la République
Gregorian	6 April, AD 2026
Hebrew	19 Nisan, AM 5786; Omer 4
Hindu	Anurādhā・Siddhi; Solar: 24 Caitra, 1947 SE; Lunisolar: Caturthī, Kṛishna pakṣa of Caitra, 2083 VE; Rāudra・5126 KY・1,872,671
Icelandic	Mánudagur, 14 Einmánuður 2025
Islamic	18 Shawwal, AH 1447 (using tabular method)
ISO week date	2026-W15-1
Japanese	19 Kisaragi, Reiwa 8 (Seimei, 14 days until Kokuu)
Julian	24 March, AD 2026 (AM 7534)
Julian day	2461137
Korean	19 Tokkidal, 4359 DE
Maya	13.0.13.8.14; 7 Pop, 9 Ix
Roman	ante diem IX Kalendas Apriles, MMDCCLXXIX AUC
Solar Hijri	17 Farvardin, SH 1405
Tibetan	19 dbo, me pho rta 2153 or 1772 or 1000

<<	April					>>
Su	Mo	Tu	We	Th	Fr	Sa
			1	2	3	4
5	6	7	8	9	10	11
12	13	14	15	16	17	18
19	20	21	22	23	24	25
26	27	28	29	30
2026

April 6 in recent years
2026 (Monday)
2025 (Sunday)
2024 (Saturday)
2023 (Thursday)
2022 (Wednesday)
2021 (Tuesday)
2020 (Monday)
2019 (Saturday)
2018 (Friday)
2017 (Thursday)

April 6 is the 96th day of the year (97th in leap years) in the Gregorian calendar; 269 days remain until the end of the year.

== Events ==
=== Pre–1600 ===
- 46 BC – Julius Caesar defeats Caecilius Metellus Scipio and Marcus Porcius Cato (Cato the Younger) at the Battle of Thapsus.
- 402 – Stilicho defeats the Visigoths under Alaric in the Battle of Pollentia.
- 945 – Byzantine Emperor Constantine VII crowns his son Romanos II as co-emperor.
- 1320 – The Scots reaffirm their independence by signing the Declaration of Arbroath.
- 1453 – Mehmed II begins his siege of Constantinople. The city falls on May 29 and is renamed Istanbul.
- 1580 – One of the largest earthquakes recorded in the history of England, Flanders, or Northern France, takes place.

=== 1601–1900 ===
- 1652 – At the Cape of Good Hope, Dutch sailor Jan van Riebeeck establishes a resupply camp that eventually becomes Cape Town.
- 1712 – The New York Slave Revolt of 1712 begins near Broadway.
- 1776 – American Revolutionary War: Ships of the Continental Navy fail in their attempt to capture a Royal Navy dispatch boat.
- 1782 – King Buddha Yodfa Chulaloke (Rama I) of Siam (modern day Thailand) establishes the Chakri dynasty.
- 1793 – During the French Revolution, the Committee of Public Safety becomes the executive organ of the republic.
- 1800 – The Treaty of Constantinople establishes the Septinsular Republic, the first autonomous Greek state since the Fall of the Byzantine Empire. (Under the Old Style calendar then still in use in the Ottoman Empire, the treaty was signed on 21 March.)
- 1808 – John Jacob Astor incorporates the American Fur Company, that would eventually make him America's first millionaire.
- 1812 – British forces under the command of the Duke of Wellington assault the fortress of Badajoz. This would be the turning point in the Peninsular War against Napoleon-led France.
- 1814 – Nominal beginning of the Bourbon Restoration; anniversary date that Napoleon abdicates and is exiled to Elba.
- 1830 – Church of Christ, the original church of the Latter Day Saint movement, is organized by Joseph Smith and others at either Fayette or Manchester, New York.
- 1841 – U.S. President John Tyler is sworn in, two days after having become president upon William Henry Harrison's death.
- 1860 – The Reorganized Church of Jesus Christ of Latter Day Saints, later renamed Community of Christ, is organized by Joseph Smith III and others at Amboy, Illinois.
- 1862 – American Civil War: The Battle of Shiloh begins: In Tennessee, forces under Union General Ulysses S. Grant meet Confederate troops led by General Albert Sidney Johnston.
- 1865 – American Civil War: The Battle of Sailor's Creek: Confederate General Robert E. Lee's Army of Northern Virginia fights and loses its last major battle while in retreat from Richmond, Virginia, during the Appomattox Campaign.
- 1866 – The Grand Army of the Republic, an American patriotic organization composed of Union veterans of the American Civil War, is founded. It lasts until 1956.
- 1896 – In Athens, the opening of the first modern Olympic Games is celebrated, 1,500 years after the original games are banned by Roman emperor Theodosius I.

=== 1901–present ===
- 1909 – Robert Peary and Matthew Henson become the first people to reach the North Pole; Peary's claim has been disputed because of failings in his navigational ability.
- 1911 – During the Battle of Deçiq, Dedë Gjon Luli Dedvukaj, leader of the Malësori Albanians, raises the Albanian flag in the town of Tuzi, Montenegro, for the first time after George Kastrioti (Skanderbeg).
- 1917 – World War I: The United States declares war on Germany.
- 1918 – Finnish Civil War: The battle of Tampere ends.
- 1926 – Varney Airlines makes its first commercial flight (Varney is the root company of United Airlines).
- 1929 – Huey P. Long, Governor of Louisiana, is impeached by the Louisiana House of Representatives.
- 1930 – At the end of the Salt March, Gandhi raises a lump of mud and salt and declares, "With this, I am shaking the foundations of the British Empire."
- 1936 – Tupelo–Gainesville tornado outbreak: Another tornado from the same storm system as the Tupelo tornado hits Gainesville, Georgia, killing 203.
- 1941 – World War II: Nazi Germany launches Operation 25 (the invasion of Kingdom of Yugoslavia) and Operation Marita (the invasion of Greece).
- 1945 – World War II: Sarajevo is liberated from German and Croatian forces by the Yugoslav Partisans.
- 1945 – World War II: The Battle of Slater's Knoll on Bougainville comes to an end.
- 1947 – The first Tony Awards are presented for theatrical achievement.
- 1948 – The Finno-Soviet Treaty is signed in Moscow.
- 1957 – The flag carrier airline of Greece for decades, Olympic Airways, is founded by Aristotle Onassis following the acquisition of "TAE - Greek National Airlines".
- 1958 – Capital Airlines Flight 67 crashes in Tittabawassee Township, Michigan, near Freeland Tri-City Airport, killing 47.
- 1965 – Launch of Early Bird, the first commercial communications satellite to be placed in geosynchronous orbit.
- 1968 – In the downtown district of Richmond, Indiana, a double explosion kills 41 and injures 150.
- 1968 – Pierre Elliott Trudeau wins the Liberal Party leadership election, and becomes Prime Minister of Canada soon afterward.
- 1970 – Newhall massacre: Four California Highway Patrol officers are killed in a shootout.
- 1972 – Vietnam War: Easter Offensive: American forces begin sustained air strikes and naval bombardments.
- 1973 – Launch of Pioneer 11 spacecraft.
- 1973 – The American League of Major League Baseball begins using the designated hitter.
- 1974 – In Brighton, United Kingdom, ABBA wins the 1974 edition of the Eurovision Song Contest with "Waterloo", the first of a joint-record seven Swedish wins.
- 1974 – The first California Jam festival takes place at the Ontario Motor Speedway in Ontario, California. Co-headlined by Deep Purple and Emerson, Lake & Palmer. The festival set what were then records for the loudest amplification system ever installed, the highest paid attendance, and highest gross in history.
- 1984 – Members of Cameroon's Republican Guard unsuccessfully attempt to overthrow the government headed by Paul Biya.
- 1985 – Sudanese President Gaafar Nimeiry is ousted from power in a coup d'état led by Field Marshal Abdel Rahman Swar al-Dahab.
- 1992 – The Bosnian War begins.
- 1994 – The Rwandan genocide begins when the aircraft carrying Rwandan president Juvénal Habyarimana and Burundian president Cyprien Ntaryamira is shot down.
- 1997 – In Greene County, Tennessee, the Lillelid murders occur.
- 1998 – Nuclear weapons testing: Pakistan tests medium-range missiles capable of reaching India.
- 2004 – Rolandas Paksas becomes the first president of Lithuania to be peacefully removed from office by impeachment.
- 2005 – Kurdish leader Jalal Talabani becomes Iraqi president; Shiite Arab Ibrahim al-Jaafari is named premier the next day.
- 2008 – The 2008 Egyptian general strike starts led by Egyptian workers later to be adopted by April 6 Youth Movement and Egyptian activists.
- 2009 – A 6.3 magnitude earthquake strikes near L'Aquila, Italy, killing 307.
- 2010 – Maoist rebels kill 76 CRPF officers in Dantewada district, India.
- 2011 – In San Fernando, Tamaulipas, Mexico, over 193 victims of Los Zetas were exhumed from several mass graves.
- 2012 – Azawad declares itself independent from the Republic of Mali.
- 2017 – U.S. military launches 59 Tomahawk cruise missiles at an air base in Syria. Russia describes the strikes as an "aggression", adding they significantly damage US-Russia ties.
- 2018 – A bus carrying the Humboldt Broncos junior ice hockey team collides with a semi-truck in Saskatchewan, Canada, killing 16 people and injuring 13 others.
- 2026 – The crew of Artemis II makes the first crewed circumlunar flight since Apollo 17 in 1972, returning humanity to the Moon's vicinity and breaking Apollo 13's record by ~4,000 miles as the furthest crewed spaceflight.

== Births ==
=== Pre–1600 ===
- 1135 – Maimonides, Jewish philosopher, Torah scholar, physician and astronomer (March 30 also proposed, died 1204)
- 1342 – Infanta Maria, Marchioness of Tortosa
- 1573 – Margaret of Brunswick-Lüneburg, German noble (died 1643)

=== 1601–1900 ===
- 1632 – Maria Leopoldine of Austria (died 1649)
- 1651 – André Dacier, French scholar and academic (died 1722)
- 1660 – Johann Kuhnau, German organist and composer (died 1722)
- 1664 – Arvid Horn, Swedish general and politician, Governor of Västerbotten County (died 1742)
- 1671 – Jean-Baptiste Rousseau, French poet and playwright (died 1741)
- 1672 – André Cardinal Destouches, French composer (died 1749)
- 1706 – Louis de Cahusac, French playwright and composer (died 1759)
- 1708 – Johann Georg Reutter, Austrian organist and composer (died 1772)
- 1725 – Pasquale Paoli, French soldier and politician (died 1807)
- 1726 – Gerard Majella, Italian saint (died 1755)
- 1741 – Nicolas Chamfort, French author and playwright (died 1794)
- 1766 – Wilhelm von Kobell, German painter and educator (died 1853)
- 1773 – James Mill, Scottish historian, economist, and philosopher (died 1836)
- 1787 – Celestina Cordero, Puerto Rican educator (died 1862)
- 1810 – Philip Henry Gosse, English biologist and academic (died 1888)
- 1812 – Alexander Herzen, Russian philosopher and author (died 1870)
- 1815 – Robert Volkmann, German organist, composer, and conductor (died 1883)
- 1818 – Aasmund Olavsson Vinje, Norwegian journalist and poet (died 1870)
- 1820 – Nadar, French photographer, journalist, and author (died 1910)
- 1823 – Joseph Medill, Canadian-American publisher and politician, 26th Mayor of Chicago (died 1899)
- 1824 – George Waterhouse, English-New Zealand politician, 7th Prime Minister of New Zealand (died 1906)
- 1826 – Gustave Moreau, French painter and academic (died 1898)
- 1844 – William Lyne, Australian politician, 13th Premier of New South Wales (died 1913)
- 1851 – Guillaume Bigourdan, French astronomer and academic (died 1932)
- 1852 – Will Crooks, English trade unionist and politician (died 1921)
- 1855 – Charles Huot, Canadian painter and illustrator (died 1930)
- 1857 – Arthur Wesley Dow, American painter and photographer (died 1922)
- 1860 – René Lalique, French sculptor and jewellery designer (died 1945)
- 1861 – Stanislas de Guaita, French poet and author (died 1897)
- 1864 – William Bate Hardy, English biologist and academic (died 1934)
- 1866 – Felix-Raymond-Marie Rouleau, Canadian cardinal (died 1931)
- 1869 – Levon Shant, Armenian author, poet, and playwright (died 1951)
- 1871 – Prince Alexander John of Wales, British Prince
- 1878 – Erich Mühsam, German author, poet, and playwright (died 1934)
- 1881 – Karl Staaf, Swedish pole vaulter and hammer thrower (died 1953)
- 1884 – J. G. Parry-Thomas, Welsh race car driver and engineer (died 1927)
- 1886 – Athenagoras I of Constantinople (died 1972)
- 1886 – Walter Dandy, American physician and neurosurgeon (died 1946)
- 1886 – Osman Ali Khan, Asaf Jah VII, Indian ruler (died 1967)
- 1888 – Hans Richter, Swiss painter, illustrator, and director (died 1976)
- 1888 – Gerhard Ritter, German historian and academic (died 1967)
- 1890 – Anthony Fokker, Dutch engineer and businessman, founded Fokker Aircraft Manufacturer (died 1939)
- 1892 – Donald Wills Douglas, Sr., American businessman, founded the Douglas Aircraft Company (died 1981)
- 1892 – Lowell Thomas, American journalist and author (died 1981)
- 1895 – Dudley Nichols, American director, producer, and screenwriter (died 1960)
- 1898 – Jeanne Hébuterne, French painter and author (died 1920)
- 1900 – Leo Robin, American composer and songwriter (died 1984)

=== 1901–present ===
- 1901 – Pier Giorgio Frassati, Italian activist (died 1925)
- 1902 – Julien Torma, French author, poet, and playwright (died 1933)
- 1903 – Mickey Cochrane, American baseball player and manager (died 1962)
- 1903 – Harold Eugene Edgerton, American engineer and academic (died 1990)
- 1904 – Kurt Georg Kiesinger, German lawyer, politician and Chancellor of Germany (died 1988)
- 1904 – Erwin Komenda, Austrian car designer and engineer (died 1966)
- 1906 – Virginia Hall, American who was a spy in France for the UK and US during WWII (died 1982)
- 1908 – Marcel-Marie Desmarais, Canadian preacher, missionary, and author (died 1994)
- 1908 – Ernie Lombardi, American baseball player (died 1977)
- 1909 – William M. Branham, American minister and theologian (died 1965)
- 1909 – Hermann Lang, German race car driver (died 1987)
- 1910 – Barys Kit, Belarusian-American rocket scientist (died 2018)
- 1911 – Feodor Felix Konrad Lynen, German biochemist and academic, Nobel Prize laureate (died 1979)
- 1913 – Shannon Boyd-Bailey McCune, American geographer and academic (died 1993)
- 1915 – Tadeusz Kantor, Polish director, painter, and set designer (died 1990)
- 1916 – Phil Leeds, American actor (died 1998)
- 1916 – Vincent Ellis McKelvey, American geologist and author (died 1987)
- 1917 – Leonora Carrington, English-Mexican painter and author (died 2011)
- 1918 – Alfredo Ovando Candía, Bolivian general and politician, 56th President of Bolivia (died 1982)
- 1919 – Georgios Mylonas, Greek politician, 11th Greek Minister of Culture (died 1998)
- 1920 – Jack Cover, American pilot and physicist, invented the Taser gun (died 2009)
- 1920 – Edmond H. Fischer, Swiss-American biochemist and academic, Nobel Prize laureate (died 2021)
- 1921 – Wilbur Thompson, American shot putter (died 2013)
- 1922 – Gordon Chater, English-Australian comedian and actor (died 1999)
- 1923 – Herb Thomas, American race car driver (died 2000)
- 1926 – Sergio Franchi, Italian-American singer and actor (died 1990)
- 1926 – Gil Kane, Latvian-American author and illustrator (died 2000)
- 1926 – Ian Paisley, Northern Irish evangelical minister and politician, 2nd First Minister of Northern Ireland (died 2014)
- 1926 – Randy Weston, American jazz pianist and composer (died 2018)
- 1927 – Gerry Mulligan, American saxophonist, clarinet player, and composer (died 1996)
- 1928 – James Watson, American biologist, geneticist, and zoologist, Nobel Prize laureate (died 2025)
- 1929 – Willis Hall, English playwright and author (died 2005)
- 1929 – Joi Lansing, American model, actress and nightclub singer (died 1972)
- 1929 – André Previn, American pianist, composer, and conductor (died 2019)
- 1929 – Christos Sartzetakis, Greek jurist, supreme justice and President of Greece (died 2022)
- 1930 – Qiu Dahong, Chinese coastal and offshore engineer, member of the Chinese Academy of Sciences (died 2025)
- 1931 – Ram Dass, American author and educator (died 2019)
- 1931 – Ivan Dixon, American actor, director, and producer (died 2008)
- 1932 – Connie Broden, Canadian ice hockey player (died 2013)
- 1932 – Helmut Griem, German actor and director (died 2004)
- 1933 – Roy Goode, English lawyer and academic
- 1933 – Tom C. Korologos, American journalist and diplomat, United States Ambassador to Belgium (died 2024)
- 1933 – Eduardo Malapit, American lawyer and politician, Mayor of Kauai (died 2007)
- 1934 – Enrique Álvarez Félix, Mexican actor (died 1996)
- 1934 – Anton Geesink, Dutch martial artist and wrestler (died 2010)
- 1934 – Guy Peellaert, Belgian painter, illustrator, and photographer (died 2008)
- 1935 – Douglas Hill, Canadian author and critic (died 2007)
- 1936 – Helen Berman, Dutch-Israeli painter and illustrator
- 1936 – Jean-Pierre Changeux, French neuroscientist, biologist, and academic
- 1937 – Merle Haggard, American singer-songwriter and guitarist (died 2016)
- 1937 – Tom Veivers, Australian cricketer and politician
- 1937 – Billy Dee Williams, American actor, singer, and writer
- 1938 – Paul Daniels, English magician and television host (died 2016)
- 1938 – Roy Thinnes, American television and film actor
- 1939 – André Ouellet, Canadian lawyer and politician, 1st Canadian Minister of Foreign Affairs
- 1939 – John Sculley, American businessman, co-founded Zeta Interactive
- 1940 – Homero Aridjis, Mexican journalist, author, and poet
- 1940 – Pedro Armendáriz, Jr., Mexican-American actor and producer (died 2011)
- 1941 – Christopher Allsopp, English economist and academic
- 1941 – Phil Austin, American comedian, actor, and screenwriter (died 2015)
- 1941 – Hans W. Geißendörfer, German director and producer
- 1941 – Angeliki Laiou, Greek-American Byzantinist and politician (died 2008)
- 1941 – Don Prudhomme, American race car driver and manager
- 1941 – Gheorghe Zamfir, Romanian flute player and composer
- 1942 – Barry Levinson, American actor, director, producer, and screenwriter
- 1942 – Anita Pallenberg, Italian-English model, actress, and fashion designer (died 2017)
- 1943 – Max Clifford, English journalist and publicist (died 2017)
- 1943 – Roger Cook, New Zealand-English journalist and academic (died 2026)
- 1943 – Ian MacRae, New Zealand rugby player
- 1943 – Mitchell Melton, American lawyer and politician (died 2013)
- 1944 – Felicity Palmer, English operatic soprano
- 1944 – Charles Sobhraj, French serial killer
- 1945 – Rodney Bickerstaffe, English trade union leader (died 2017)
- 1945 – Peter Hill, English journalist
- 1946 – Paul Beresford, New Zealand-English dentist and politician
- 1947 – John Ratzenberger, American actor and director
- 1947 – André Weinfeld, French-American director, producer, and screenwriter
- 1947 – Mike Worboys, English mathematician and computer scientist
- 1949 – Alyson Bailes, English academic and diplomat (died 2016)
- 1949 – Patrick Hernandez, French singer-songwriter
- 1949 – Ng Ser Miang, Singaporean athlete, entrepreneur and diplomat
- 1949 – Horst Ludwig Störmer, German physicist and academic, Nobel Prize laureate
- 1950 – Claire Morissette, Canadian cycling activist (died 2007)
- 1950 – Cleo Odzer, American anthropologist and author (died 2001)
- 1951 – Bert Blyleven, Dutch-American baseball player and sportscaster
- 1951 – Jean-Marc Boivin, French skier, mountaineer, and pilot (died 1990)
- 1951 – Pascal Rogé, French pianist
- 1952 – Udo Dirkschneider, German singer-songwriter
- 1952 – Marilu Henner, Greek-Polish American actress and author
- 1952 – Michel Larocque, Canadian ice hockey player and manager (died 1992)
- 1953 – Patrick Doyle, Scottish actor and composer
- 1953 – Christopher Franke, German-American drummer and songwriter
- 1955 – Rob Epstein, American director and producer
- 1955 – Michael Rooker, American actor, director, and producer
- 1955 – Cathy Jones, Canadian actress, comedian, and writer
- 1956 – Michele Bachmann, American lawyer and politician
- 1956 – Normand Corbeil, Canadian composer (died 2013)
- 1956 – Mudassar Nazar, Pakistani cricketer
- 1956 – Lee Scott, English politician
- 1956 – Sebastian Spreng, Argentinian-American painter and journalist
- 1956 – Dilip Vengsarkar, Indian cricketer and coach
- 1957 – Giorgio Damilano, Italian race walker and coach
- 1957 – Maurizio Damilano, Italian race walker and coach
- 1957 – Jaroslava Maxová, Czech soprano and educator
- 1957 – Paolo Nespoli, Italian soldier, engineer, and astronaut
- 1958 – Graeme Base, Australian author and illustrator
- 1959 – Gail Shea, Canadian politician
- 1960 – Warren Haynes, American singer-songwriter and guitarist
- 1960 – Richard Loe, New Zealand rugby player
- 1960 – John Pizzarelli, American singer-songwriter and guitarist
- 1961 – Rory Bremner, Scottish impressionist and comedian
- 1961 – Peter Jackson, English footballer and manager
- 1962 – Iris Häussler, German sculptor and academic
- 1962 – Marco Schällibaum, Swiss footballer, coach, and manager
- 1963 – Rafael Correa, Ecuadorian economist and politician, 54th President of Ecuador
- 1964 – Tim Walz, American politician, Governor of Minnesota & vice presidential candidate
- 1965 – Black Francis, American singer-songwriter and guitarist
- 1965 – Sterling Sharpe, American football player and sportscaster
- 1966 – Vince Flynn, American author (died 2013)
- 1966 – Young Man Kang, South Korean-American director and producer
- 1967 – Julian Anderson, English composer and educator
- 1967 – Kathleen Barr, Canadian voice actress and singer
- 1967 – Tanya Byron, English psychologist and academic
- 1967 – Jonathan Firth, English actor
- 1968 – Archon Fung, American political scientist, author, and academic
- 1968 – Affonso Giaffone, Brazilian race car driver
- 1969 – Bret Boone, American baseball player and manager
- 1969 – Bison Dele, American basketball player (died 2002)
- 1969 – Philipp Peter, Austrian race car driver
- 1969 – Paul Rudd, American actor
- 1969 – Spencer Wells, American geneticist and anthropologist
- 1970 – Olaf Kölzig, South African-German ice hockey player and coach
- 1970 – Roy Mayorga, American drummer, songwriter, and producer
- 1970 – Huang Xiaomin, Chinese swimmer
- 1972 – Anders Thomas Jensen, Danish director and screenwriter
- 1972 – Dickey Simpkins, American basketball player and sportscaster
- 1973 – Donnie Edwards, American football player
- 1973 – Randall Godfrey, American football player
- 1973 – Rie Miyazawa, Japanese model and actress
- 1973 – Sun Wen, Chinese footballer
- 1975 – Zach Braff, American actor, director, producer, and screenwriter
- 1975 – Hal Gill, American ice hockey player
- 1976 – Candace Cameron Bure, American actress and talk show panelist
- 1976 – James Fox, Welsh singer-songwriter, guitarist, and actor
- 1976 – Chris Hoke, American football player
- 1976 – Georg Hólm, Icelandic bass player
- 1976 – Hirotada Ototake, Japanese author and educator
- 1977 – Ville Nieminen, Finnish ice hockey player
- 1977 – Andy Phillips, American baseball player and coach
- 1978 – Imani Coppola, American singer-songwriter and violinist
- 1978 – Robert Glasper, American singer-songwriter, pianist, and producer
- 1978 – Tim Hasselbeck, American football player and sportscaster
- 1978 – Myleene Klass, Austrian/Filipino-English singer, pianist, and model
- 1978 – Martín Méndez, Uruguayan bass player and songwriter
- 1978 – Blaine Neal, American baseball player
- 1978 – Igor Semshov, Russian footballer
- 1979 – Lord Frederick Windsor, English journalist and financier
- 1979 – Clay Travis, American sports journalist, blogger, and broadcaster
- 1980 – Tommi Evilä, Finnish long jumper
- 1980 – Tanja Poutiainen, Finnish skier
- 1981 – Robert Earnshaw, Welsh footballer
- 1981 – Jeff Faine, American football player
- 1981 – Lucas Licht, Argentine footballer
- 1981 – Alex Suarez, American bass player
- 1982 – Travis Moen, Canadian ice hockey player
- 1982 – Miguel Ángel Silvestre, Spanish actor
- 1983 – Mehdi Ballouchy, Moroccan footballer
- 1983 – Jerome Kaino, New Zealand rugby player
- 1983 – Mitsuru Nagata, Japanese footballer
- 1983 – Remi Nicole, English singer-songwriter and actress
- 1983 – James Wade, English darts player
- 1983 – Katie Weatherston, Canadian ice hockey player
- 1984 – Max Bemis, American singer-songwriter
- 1984 – Michaël Ciani, French footballer
- 1984 – Siboniso Gaxa, South African footballer
- 1984 – Diana Matheson, Canadian soccer player
- 1985 – Fatau Dauda, Ghanaian footballer
- 1985 – Clarke MacArthur, Canadian ice hockey player
- 1985 – Frank Ongfiang, Cameroonian footballer
- 1985 – Sinqua Walls, American basketball player and actor
- 1986 – Nikolas Asprogenis, Cypriot footballer
- 1986 – Aaron Curry, American football player
- 1986 – Goeido Gotaro, Japanese sumo wrestler
- 1986 – Ryota Moriwaki, Japanese footballer
- 1987 – Benjamin Corgnet, French footballer
- 1987 – Heidi Mount, American model
- 1987 – Levi Porter, English footballer
- 1987 – Hilary Rhoda, American model
- 1988 – Jucilei, Brazilian footballer
- 1988 – Leigh Adams, Australian footballer
- 1988 – Daniele Gasparetto, Italian footballer
- 1988 – Carlton Mitchell, American football player
- 1988 – Fabrice Muamba, Congolese-English footballer
- 1988 – Ivonne Orsini, Puerto Rican model and television host, Miss World Puerto Rico 2008
- 1990 – Lachlan Coote, Australian rugby league player
- 1990 – Charlie McDermott, American actor
- 1990 – Andrei Veis, Estonian footballer
- 1992 – Ken, South Korean singer
- 1992 – Julie Ertz, American soccer player
- 1992 – Huh Chan-mi, South Korean singer
- 1994 – Adrián Alonso, Mexican actor
- 1995 – Darya Lebesheva, Belarusian tennis player
- 1996 – Al-Musrati, Libyan footballer
- 1997 – Mingyu, South Korean singer and rapper
- 1998 – Nicolás González, Argentine footballer
- 1998 – Peyton List, American actress and model
- 1998 – Spencer List, American actor
- 1998 – Nahuel Molina, Argentine footballer
- 2000 – Shaheen Afridi, Pakistani cricketer
- 2000 – Maxence Lacroix, French footballer
- 2001 – Oscar Piastri, Australian racing driver
- 2001 – Moritz Seider, German ice hockey player
- 2002 – Andrea Botez, Canadian-American chess player, commentator, Twitch streamer and YouTuber
- 2002 – Leyre Romero Gormaz, Spanish tennis player
- 2009 – Shaylee Mansfield, deaf American actress and YouTuber
- 2009 – Valentina Tronel, French child singer

== Deaths ==
=== Pre–1600 ===
- 861 – Prudentius, bishop of Troyes
- 885 – Saint Methodius, Byzantine missionary and saint (born 815)
- 887 – Pei Che, chancellor of the Tang Dynasty
- 943 – Liu Churang, Chinese general and chief of staff (born 881)
- 943 – Nasr II, ruler (amir) of the Samanid Empire (born 906)
- 1147 – Frederick II, duke of Swabia (born 1090)
- 1174 – Umara al-Yamani, Yemeni poet and historian (born 1121)
- 1199 – Richard I, king of England (born 1157)
- 1231 – William Marshal, 2nd Earl of Pembroke
- 1250 – Guillaume de Sonnac, Grand Master of the Knights Templar
- 1252 – Peter of Verona, Italian priest and saint (born 1206)
- 1340 – Basil, emperor of Trebizond (Turkey)
- 1362 – James I, count of La Marche (born 1319)
- 1376 – Preczlaw of Pogarell, Cardinal and Bishop of Wrocław (born 1310)
- 1490 – Matthias Corvinus, King of Hungary and Croatia from 1458 to 1490 (born 1443)
- 1520 – Raphael, Italian painter and architect (born 1483)
- 1523 – Henry Stafford, 1st Earl of Wiltshire, English nobleman (born 1479)
- 1528 – Albrecht Dürer, German painter, engraver, and mathematician (born 1471)
- 1551 – Joachim Vadian, Swiss scholar and politician (born 1484)
- 1571 – John Hamilton, Scottish archbishop and academic (born 1512)
- 1590 – Francis Walsingham, English politician and diplomat, Chancellor of the Duchy of Lancaster (born 1532)
- 1593 – Henry Barrowe, English Puritan and separatist (born 1550)

=== 1601–1900 ===
- 1605 – John Stow, English historian and author (born 1525)
- 1621 – Edward Seymour, 1st Earl of Hertford (born 1539)
- 1641 – Domenico Zampieri (Domenichino), Italian painter (born 1581)
- 1655 – David Blondel, French minister, historian, and scholar (born 1591)
- 1670 – Leonora Baroni, Italian composer (born 1611)
- 1676 – John Winthrop the Younger, English politician, 1st Governor of Connecticut (born 1606)
- 1686 – Arthur Annesley, 1st Earl of Anglesey, Irish-English politician (born 1614)
- 1707 – Willem van de Velde the Younger, Dutch-English painter (born 1633)
- 1755 – Richard Rawlinson, English minister and historian (born 1690)
- 1790 – Louis IX, Landgrave of Hesse-Darmstadt (born 1719)
- 1825 – Vladimir Borovikovsky, Ukrainian-Russian painter and educator (born 1757)
- 1827 – Nikolis Apostolis, Greek naval commander during the Greek War of Independence (born 1770)
- 1829 – Niels Henrik Abel, Norwegian mathematician and theorist (born 1802)
- 1833 – Adamantios Korais, Greek philosopher and scholar (born 1748)
- 1838 – José Bonifácio de Andrada, Brazilian poet, academic, and politician (born 1763)
- 1860 – James Kirke Paulding, American author and politician, 11th United States Secretary of the Navy (born 1778)
- 1862 – Albert Sidney Johnston, American general (born 1803)
- 1883 – Benjamin Wright Raymond, American merchant and politician, 3rd Mayor of Chicago (born 1801)
- 1886 – William Edward Forster, English businessman, philanthropist, and politician, Chief Secretary for Ireland (born 1818)
- 1899 – Alvan Wentworth Chapman, American physician and botanist (born 1809)

=== 1901–present ===
- 1906 – Alexander Kielland, Norwegian author, playwright, and politician, 6th County Governor of Møre og Romsdal (born 1849)
- 1913 – Somerset Lowry-Corry, 4th Earl Belmore (born 1835)
- 1927 – Florence Earle Coates, American poet (born 1850)
- 1935 – Edwin Arlington Robinson, American poet and playwright (born 1869)
- 1944 – Rose O'Neill, American cartoonist, illustrator, artist, and writer (born 1874)
- 1947 – Herbert Backe, German agronomist and politician (born 1896)
- 1950 – Louis Wilkins, American pole vaulter (born 1882)
- 1953 – Idris Davies, Welsh poet and author (born 1905)
- 1959 – Leo Aryeh Mayer, Polish-Israeli scholar and academic (born 1895)
- 1961 – Jules Bordet, Belgian microbiologist and immunologist, Nobel Prize laureate (born 1870)
- 1963 – Otto Struve, Ukrainian-American astronomer and academic (born 1897)
- 1970 – Maurice Stokes, American basketball player (born 1933)
- 1971 – Igor Stravinsky, Russian-American pianist, composer, and conductor (born 1882)
- 1974 – Willem Marinus Dudok, Dutch architect (born 1884)
- 1974 – Hudson Fysh, Australian pilot and businessman, co-founded Qantas Airways Limited (born 1895)
- 1977 – Kōichi Kido, Japanese politician, 13th Lord Keeper of the Privy Seal of Japan (born 1889)
- 1979 – Ivan Vasilyov, Bulgarian architect, designed the SS. Cyril and Methodius National Library (born 1893)
- 1983 – Jayanto Nath Chaudhuri, Indian General who served as the Chief of Army Staff of the Indian Army from 1962 to 1966 and the Military Governor of Hyderabad State from 1948 to 1949. (born 1908)
- 1992 – Isaac Asimov, American science fiction writer (born 1920)
- 1994 – Juvénal Habyarimana, Rwandan banker and politician, 3rd President of Rwanda (born 1937)
- 1994 – Cyprien Ntaryamira, Burundian politician, 5th President of Burundi (born 1955)
- 1995 – Ioannis Alevras, Greek banker and politician, President of Greece (born 1912)
- 1996 – Greer Garson, English-American actress (born 1904)
- 1998 – Norbert Schmitz, German footballer (born 1958)
- 1998 – Tammy Wynette, American singer-songwriter (born 1942)
- 1999 – Red Norvo, American vibraphone player and composer (born 1908)
- 2000 – Habib Bourguiba, Tunisian politician, 1st President of Tunisia (born 1903)
- 2001 – Charles Pettigrew, American singer-songwriter (born 1963)
- 2003 – David Bloom, American journalist (born 1963)
- 2003 – Anita Borg, American computer scientist and educator; founded Anita Borg Institute for Women and Technology (born 1949)
- 2003 – Gerald Emmett Carter, Canadian cardinal (born 1912)
- 2003 – Babatunde Olatunji, Nigerian drummer, educator, and activist (born 1927)
- 2003 – Dino Yannopoulos, Greek stage director of the Metropolitan Opera (born 1919)
- 2004 – Lou Berberet, American baseball player (born 1929)
- 2004 – Larisa Bogoraz, Russian linguist and activist (born 1929)
- 2005 – Rainier III, Prince of Monaco (born 1923)
- 2005 – Anthony F. DePalma, American orthopedic surgeon and professor (born 1904)
- 2006 – Maggie Dixon, American basketball player and coach (born 1977)
- 2006 – Francis L. Kellogg, American soldier and diplomat (born 1917)
- 2006 – Stefanos Stratigos, Greek actor and director (born 1926)
- 2007 – Luigi Comencini, Italian director and producer (born 1916)
- 2009 – J. M. S. Careless, Canadian historian and academic (born 1919)
- 2009 – Shawn Mackay, Australian rugby player and coach (born 1982)
- 2010 – Wilma Mankiller, American tribal leader (born 1945)
- 2010 – Corin Redgrave, English actor (born 1939)
- 2011 – Gerald Finnerman, American director and cinematographer (born 1931)
- 2012 – Roland Guilbault, American admiral (born 1934)
- 2012 – Thomas Kinkade, American painter and illustrator (born 1958)
- 2012 – Fang Lizhi, Chinese astrophysicist and academic (born 1936)
- 2012 – Sheila Scotter, Australian fashion designer and journalist (born 1920)
- 2012 – Reed Whittemore, American poet and critic (born 1919)
- 2013 – Hilda Bynoe, Grenadian physician and politician, 2nd Governor of Grenada (born 1921)
- 2013 – Bill Guttridge, English footballer and manager (born 1931)
- 2013 – Bigas Luna, Spanish director and screenwriter (born 1946)
- 2013 – Ottmar Schreiner, German lawyer and politician (born 1946)
- 2014 – Mary Anderson, American actress (born 1918)
- 2014 – Jacques Castérède, French pianist and composer (born 1926)
- 2014 – Liv Dommersnes, Norwegian actress (born 1922)
- 2014 – Mickey Rooney, American soldier, actor, and dancer (born 1920)
- 2014 – Chuck Stone, American soldier, journalist, and academic (born 1924)
- 2014 – Massimo Tamburini, Italian motorcycle designer, co-founded Bimota (born 1943)
- 2015 – Giovanni Berlinguer, Italian lawyer and politician (born 1924)
- 2015 – James Best, American actor, director, and screenwriter (born 1926)
- 2015 – Ray Charles, American singer-songwriter and conductor (born 1918)
- 2015 – Dollard St. Laurent, Canadian ice hockey player (born 1929)
- 2016 – Merle Haggard, American singer-songwriter and guitarist (born 1937)
- 2017 – Don Rickles, American actor and comedian (born 1926)
- 2019 – Michael O'Donnell, British physician, journalist, author and broadcaster (born 1928)
- 2020 – Al Kaline, American baseball player, broadcaster and executive (born 1934)
- 2021 – Hans Küng, Swiss Catholic priest, theologian, and author (born 1928)
- 2021 – Alcee Hastings, American politician (born 1936)
- 2022 – Vladimir Zhirinovsky, Russian and Soviet politician (born 1946)
- 2022 – Jill Knight, British politician (born 1923)
- 2024 – Joseph E. Brennan, American politician, 70th Governor of Maine (born 1934)
- 2025 – Clem Burke, American drummer (born 1954)
- 2025 – Jay North, American actor (born 1951)
- 2026 – Nick Pope, British UFO writer (born 1965)

== Holidays and observances ==
- Chakri Day, commemorating the establishment of the Chakri dynasty. (Thailand)
- Christian feast day:
  - Albrecht Dürer and Lucas Cranach (Lutheran Church).
  - Brychan
  - Eutychius of Constantinople
  - Galla of Rome
  - Marcellinus of Carthage
  - Notker the Stammerer
  - Blessed Pierina Morosini
  - Pope Sixtus I
  - April 6 (Eastern Orthodox liturgics)
- International Day of Sport for Development and Peace
- National Fisherman Day (Indonesia)
- New Beer's Eve (United States)
- Tartan Day (United States & Canada)
- Waltzing Matilda Day (Australia)
- International Asexuality Day

== Other ==
- April 6 Youth Movement
- Fiscal year § United Kingdom (starts 6 April)
