= Adam Mickiewicz Gymnasium =

Former gymnasium in Pruzhany, Belarus

- Państwowe Wyższe Gimnazjum im. Adama Mickiewicza w Prużanie
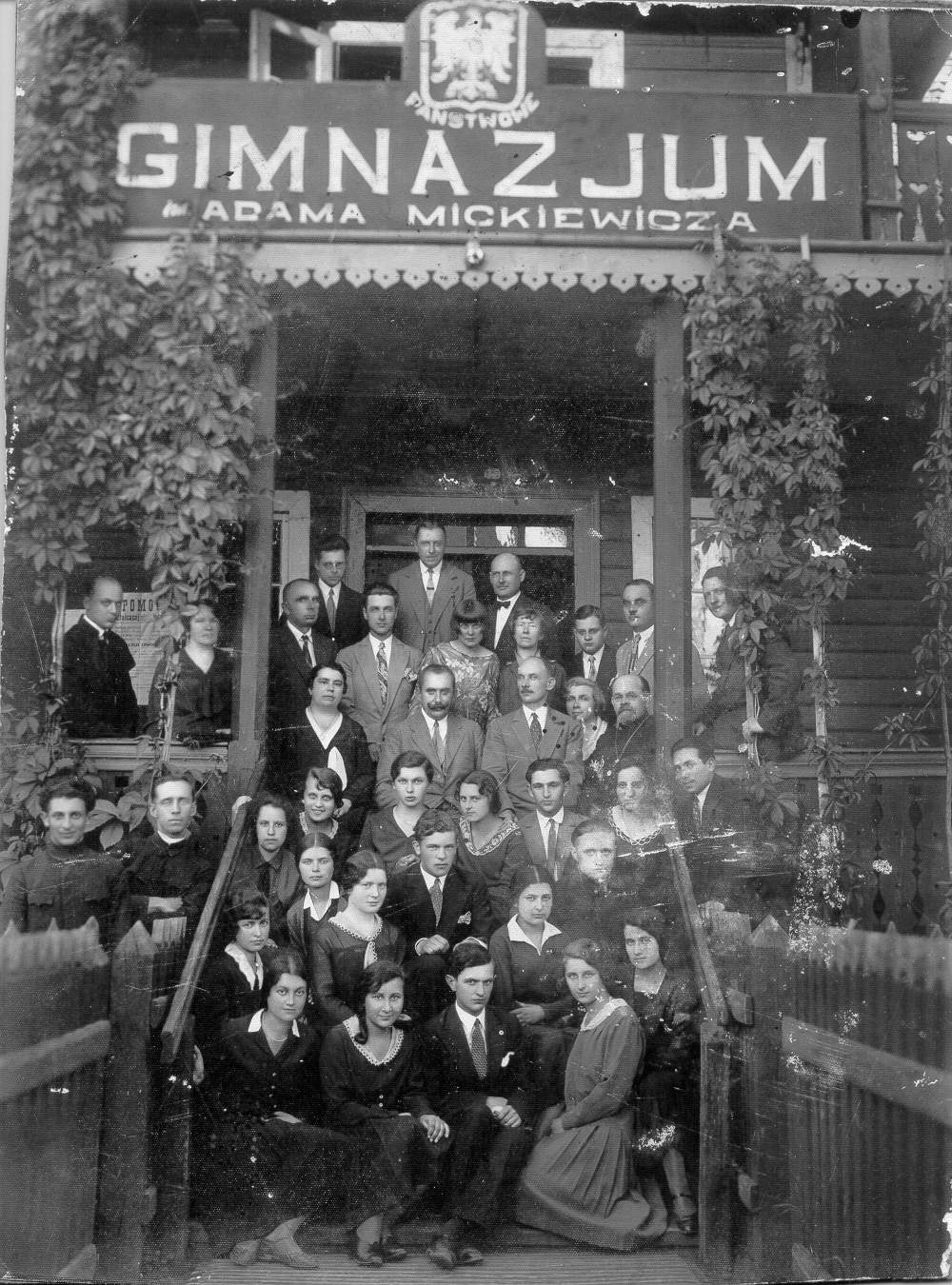
- Graduates of the gymnasium in 1936

Location
- Pruzhany; 9 Strażacka Street; Second Polish Republic; 52°33′30.6000″N 24°27′23.7600″E

Information
- Patron saint: Adam Mickiewicz
- Established: October 3, 1922
- Headmaster: 1922–1924: Zbigniew Neczaj-Hruzewicz; 1924–1928: Władysław Cichocki; 1934–?: Konstanty Kosiński
- Enrollment: 149–297

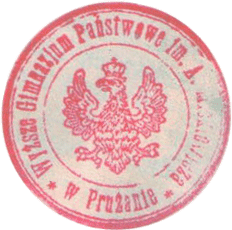
Reflection of the school seal

Adam Mickiewicz Gymnasium in Pruzhany was a gymnasium in Pruzhany, Belarus, operating during the time of the Second Polish Republic, providing education at the level of an eight-year secondary school from 1922 to 1939 and in the form of underground education during World War II. The school was established on the initiative of local residents. Until 1924, it followed a mathematical and natural science profile, then a humanistic one; it operated alongside organizations such as the scouting organization and the school brass band.

== History ==
Until 1922, there was a primary school in Pruzhany, but there was no secondary school that would qualify students to take university entrance exams. The closest such institutions were the Romuald Traugutt Gymnasium in Brest near the Bug river and the Polish Secondary School in Kobryn.

=== Private school ===
In 1922, the Organizational Committee for the Establishment of a Secondary School in Pruzhany was formed. It consisted mainly of city residents and locals who wanted to provide their children with the opportunity for secondary education in their hometown. These were mostly wealthy citizens, intellectuals, officials, Jewish merchants, and local gentry. A group led by technologist engineer Zbigniew Neczaj-Hruzewicz officially submitted a proposal to the Pruzhany City Magistrate to open a school. There was a heated debate within the city authorities, with some decision-makers opposing the new secondary school, arguing that a vocational school would suffice for the town's scale. However, the concept of establishing a gymnasium prevailed. Under the leadership of Mayor Feliks Szymański, the Pruzhany City Magistrate, and the Organizational Committee, a decision was made to establish a private coeducational mathematical and natural science gymnasium at the beginning of the 1922/1923 school year, without the rights of a state gymnasium. A special social committee was formed to launch the institution, consisting of influential city residents, including the deputy mayor and the son of a distinguished participant in the Russian Revolution of 1905, as well as Father Bolesław Franciszek (Catholic military chaplain and social activist), Father Konstanty Gubarew (Orthodox clergyman from St. Alexander Nevsky Cathedral), the local rabbi, engineer I. Czarnocki (landowner), Dr. Augustyn Pacewicz (leader of the local gentry and social activist), Mr. Krywopisza (owner of the city pharmacy), Birnbaum, and a representative of the officer corps. The committee raised funds for the organization of the school and obtained permission for its opening.

The Polesie School District Curatorium granted permission to open the institution on 21 September 1922. Three rooms were purchased in a building at 9 Strażacka Street for its needs. (Note: The 1937 phone book gives 10 Strażacka Street as the address of the gymnasium; it is not clear what the difference is due to.) It was a two-story wooden building with a tin roof, erected in 1902. During the Russian Empire era, it served as the residence of the military commandant of the city. The Pruzhany City Magistrate proposed Zbigniew Neczaj-Hruzewicz as the headmaster. On 3 October 1922, the school was ceremonially opened, attended by representatives of various state institutions, a large number of gentry, bourgeoisie, peasants, workers, and Orthodox Jews.

=== State school ===
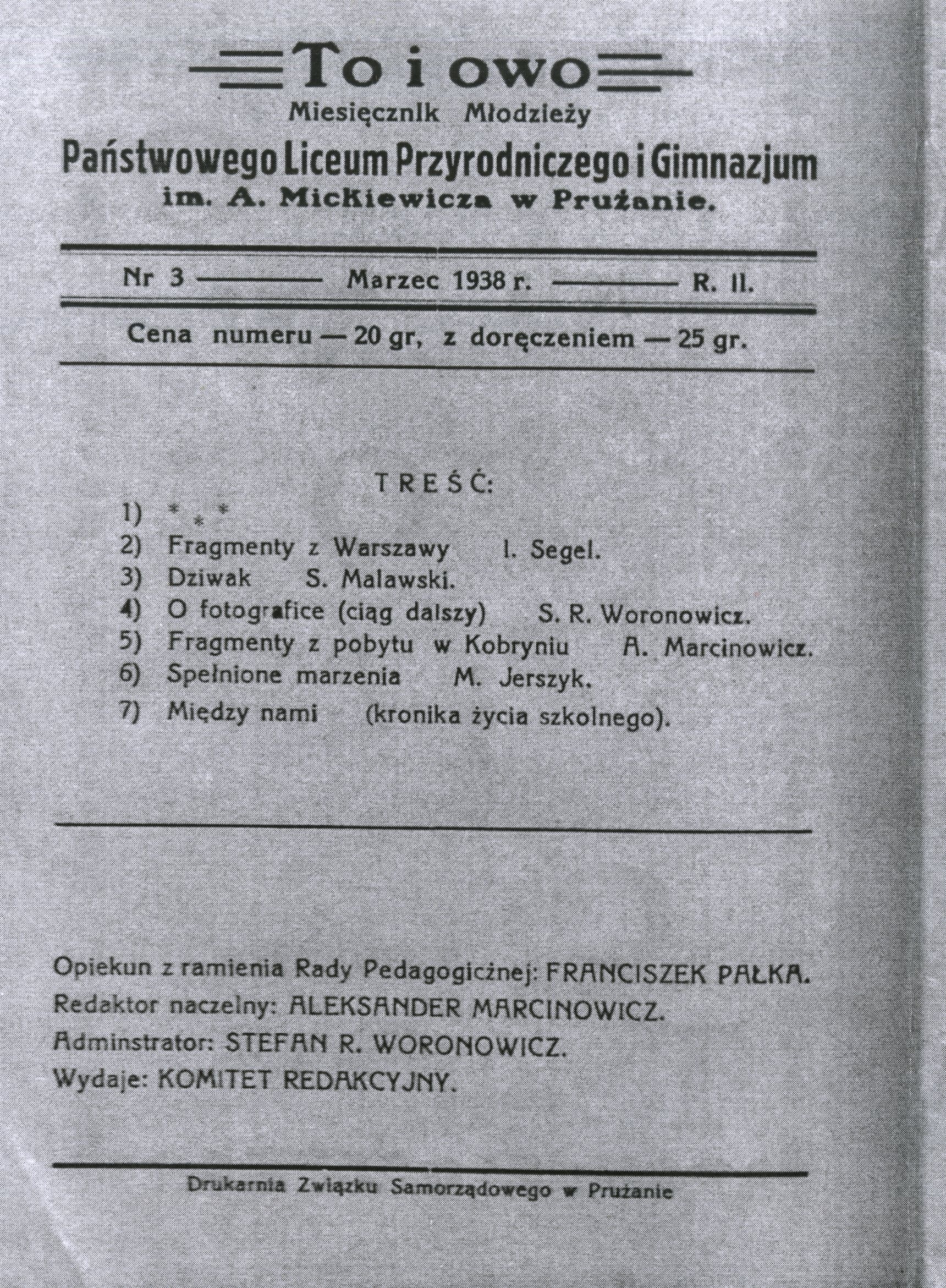
Title page of a newspaper published by students of the Adam Mickiewicz State Natural Science High School and Gymnasium

In 1923, a district school commission visited the gymnasium to examine the teaching conditions and positively assessed its level. On October 1 of the same year, with the support of the high school inspector Jan Bobka and the Polesie School District Curatorium, the Polish government decided to nationalize the institution. From then on, admissions were conducted through a representative of the district commission at special conferences. With the beginning of the 1923/1924 school year, by decision of the Ministry of Religious Affairs and Public Education, the school was officially transformed into a state coeducational higher gymnasium with a mathematical and natural science profile and Polish as the language of instruction.

According to an agreement between the curatorium and the Pruzhany Municipal Council, the city provided the entire previous wooden building with a small courtyard for the gymnasium's needs. It also committed to supplying electricity and heating. Adam Mickiewicz was unanimously chosen as the school's patron, reflecting Pruzhany's ties to the culture of Vilnius. On 6 November 1923, the Ministry of Religious Affairs and Public Education officially named the school Państwowe Wyższe Gimnazjum im. A. Mickiewicza w Prużanie (English: State Higher Gymnasium named after A. Mickiewicz in Pruzhany). Bolesław Guttmann was appointed headmaster for the 1924/1925 school year. On 11 September 1924, the profile of the gymnasium was changed to humanities. By decree of September 11 and December 17, 1924, the Ministry of Religious Affairs and Public Education appointed Władysław Cichocki (formerly a professor at the Second State Gymnasium in Rzeszów) as the headmaster of the gymnasium in Pruzhany from 1 October 1924 for the 1924/1925 school year. Shortly thereafter, through the efforts of the Directorate and the Parent Committee, the Pruzhany City Magistrate renovated and provided a brick building with a soccer field for the gymnasium.

In the 1925/1926 school year, the gymnasium operated in a wooden building with four small classrooms, a conference room, offices for the headmaster and secretary, and two pass-through toilets for the offices. There were no basements, and the administration complained about the prevailing dampness. According to the 1926 report, both buildings were entirely unsuitable for the gymnasium. The total area under the school's jurisdiction was 3,280 m^{2}, with the buildings occupying 412 m^{2}.

On 12 June 1925, the first maturity exam took place at the school. In the 1925/1926 school year, due to the large number of students, classes were held in a two-shift system. From the following year, classes returned to a normal schedule due to the leasing of premises by the Parent Committee, which accommodated three classrooms and offices. In September 1928, Headmaster Władysław Cichocki ended his tenure in Pruzhany to assume the position of director of the Romuald Traugutt Gymnasium in Brest near Bug river.

In 1932, at the initiative of the Parent Committee, a new two-story building was added to the gymnasium's premises. This expansion provided the school with new classrooms, a large hall, and a corridor, reaching a total area of 967 m^{2}. The expansion allowed the entire school to be moved to one location. The considerable contribution to this was made by the landowner Feliks Suligowski from the Bukrabowszczyzna estate, who offered building materials. A soccer field was arranged next to the school, used for gymnastics and transformed into an ice rink in winter for playing hockey. Konstanty Kosiński assumed the position of headmaster in 1934.

=== Underground education and the fate of the building ===
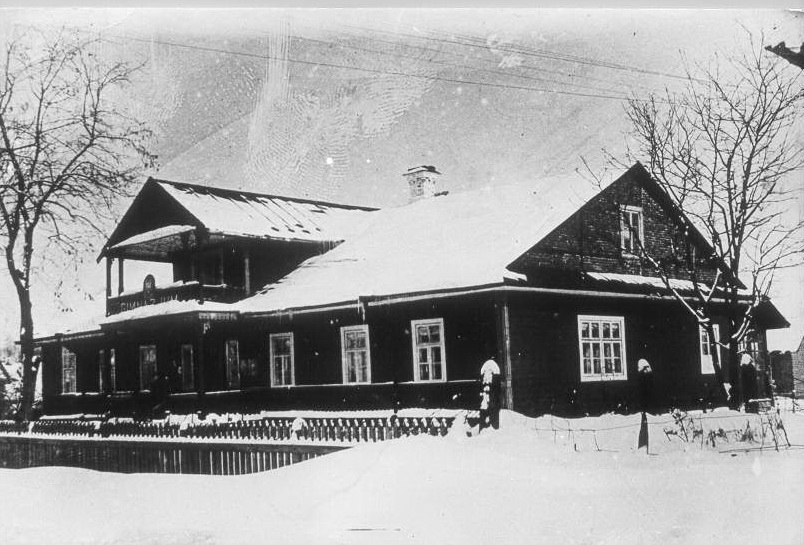
Building of the school in the winter of 1925

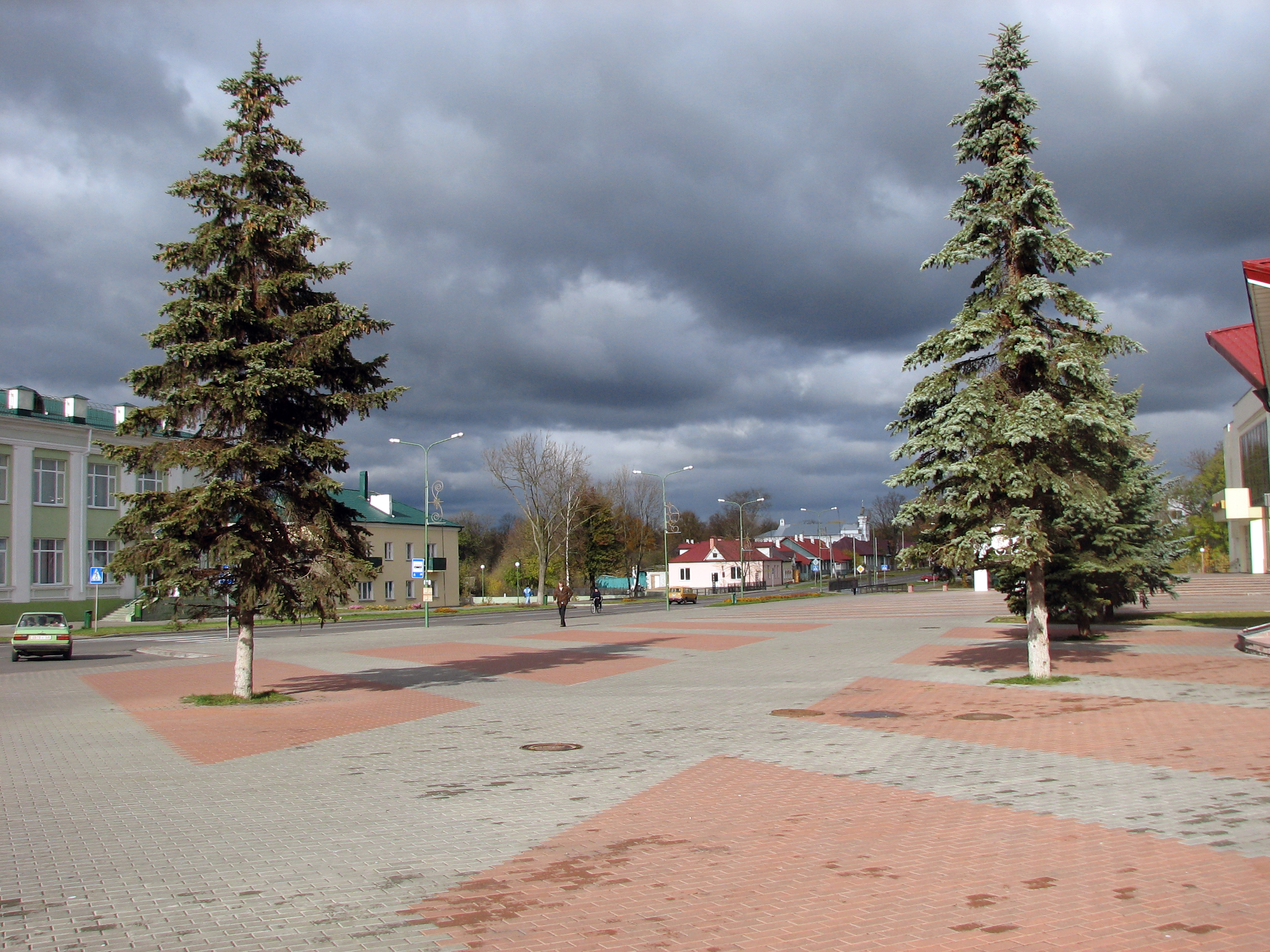
Square on the site of the demolished gymnasium building (2005)

After the Soviet invasion of Poland in 1939, the gymnasium was liquidated, and in its building, the new authorities established a Soviet secondary school, commonly referred to as the "Russian" school. Its headmistress was Walancina Žukoŭskaja, a Belarusian from Pruzhany and the older sister of a gymnasium graduate, Pruzhany Žuk-Hryškievič. However, she was replaced by a woman brought from deep within the Soviet Union just a few weeks later.

In 1940 and June 1941, some former gymnasium teachers were accused of counter-revolutionary activities and were deported with their families to Kolpashevo in the Tomsk Oblast and to the Kazakh Soviet Socialist Republic. Many of them died in exile, including the manual labor teacher Kamiński. At the same time, some teachers among those who remained in Pruzhany, including Łebkowska-Wrońska and Jan Łozowski, continued the gymnasium's activities clandestinely, conducting secret classes, which were successful throughout the entire period of World War II. Meanwhile, in the first half of 1941, the "Russian" school was transformed into the First Belarusian Secondary School in Pruzhany. Its operation was interrupted in June of the same year by the outbreak of the German-Soviet war. In 1943, the building became the seat of an eight-year Belarusian school, established by the Belarusian Committee with the approval of the German occupying administration. The premises were renovated.

Under the direction of Headmistress Janka Żedzik, the institution operated for a year, had 11 teachers, and about 450 students. It ceased to exist with the evacuation of Belarusian personnel along with the Germans on 11 July 1944. Upon the return of Soviet power, the First Belarusian Secondary School, later renamed Secondary School No. 1, returned to the building. For the last 10 years, it housed the Pioneer House. In the times of independent Belarus, the gymnasium building was demolished. For some time, there was an empty space in its place, and currently, a cultural center stands there.

Former students of the Adam Mickiewicz Gymnasium organize annual meetings in Darłówko.

== School institutions ==
In the gymnasium, there were two libraries – one for teachers and one for students. In 1925, the former had 278 volumes, while the latter had 1,186. Over time, the collections grew, reaching 1,214 and 2,847 volumes respectively in later years. In the student library, the most popular books were authored by Maria Rodziewiczówna, Maria Konopnicka, Henryk Sienkiewicz, Stefan Żeromski, Bolesław Prus, as well as adventure books and historical novels. There was also a reading room offering encyclopedias and periodicals. Subscriptions included 10 Polish magazines and 2 newspapers, 4 French magazines and 5 newspapers, as well as 2 German newspapers.

For some time, the gymnasium operated a school dormitory. The Parent Committee organized meals for its residents in private homes in Pruzhany, either paying for the service or providing food products, which helped to keep costs low. In the 1925/1926 school year, 20 students lived in the dormitory, of which 8 paid from 15 to 35 Polish złoty for its use, while the rest were exempt from the fee. The gymnasium also had a physical-chemical laboratory.

== Finances ==
The funds of the gymnasium mainly came from three sources: mandatory tuition fees, grants from the City Council, and voluntary contributions to the school. The tuition fee was 20,000 złoty. For children of state officials and teachers, there were many discounts, which in some cases even reached full exemption from fees. From the accumulated funds, the gymnasium paid salaries to teachers, bought books, equipment, fuel, and financed scientific work.

== Curriculum ==
In the academic year 1922/1923, the first year of the gymnasium's operation, students were taught according to the higher curriculum of state gymnasia with a mathematical and natural science profile. An exception was drawing and anatomy, which were not held due to a lack of suitable teachers. Latin was an optional subject.

== Extracurricular activities ==
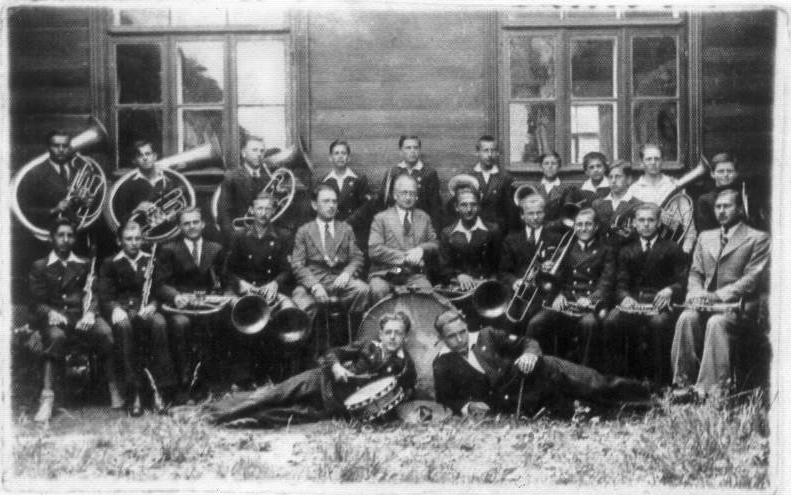
School's orchestra

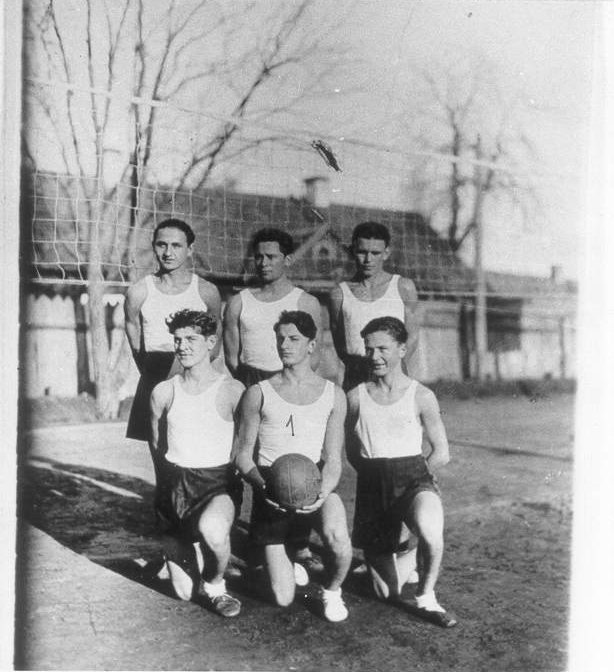
Volleyball team

As part of extracurricular activities at the gymnasium, there were four sections: humanities (Polish literature and history), physical and mathematical sciences, tourism, and physical education, as well as numerous clubs: model airplane constructors, chess, etc. At the end of each year, "weeks" of specific subjects were organized, during which students presented their best works (drawings, paintings, exhibits made of glass, metal, wood), and under the supervision of a supervisor, scientific lectures and other initiatives were organized. These events were often attended by real scientists from higher education institutions from all over Poland.

There were also youth organizations at the gymnasium. Samopomoc Towarzyska provided material support to the poorest students by their better-off peers. For this purpose, they collected 10 groszy per month. The Zawisza Czarny Scouting Society – Tadeusz Kosciuszko branch was a scouting organization. It existed from the beginning of the gymnasium's existence and participated in all school, as well as city and county, events. It participated in the World Scout Jamboree in Kielce. It organized military training courses, during which young people were taught medical aid in field conditions, military communication, map use, horse riding, weapon handling, survival in extreme conditions. There were also other youth organizations, such as the Związek Młodzieży P.S.K., Związek Szkolny L.O.P.P., Polish Red Cross organization, religious Sodalicja Mariańska, and others.

There were also a men's choir, a women's choir, and a brass band. The orchestra accompanied, among others, students every Sunday as they marched to church for Mass. It also played Chopin's Funeral March during the ceremony after the drowning of one of the graduates. In addition, students created a wall newsletter Nasza droga, of which a total of 13 issues were published and which was mentioned in the magazine Kuźnia Młodych. The school was an important cultural center of the city of Pruzhany and constantly engaged in events and celebrations of a general nature. The teaching staff participated in the organization of theatrical performances, summer camps, sightseeing trips within and beyond the county.

== Teachers ==
All teachers at the gymnasium came from central Poland and had university education. Students were required to address them as Miss Professor or Mr. Professor.

== Students ==
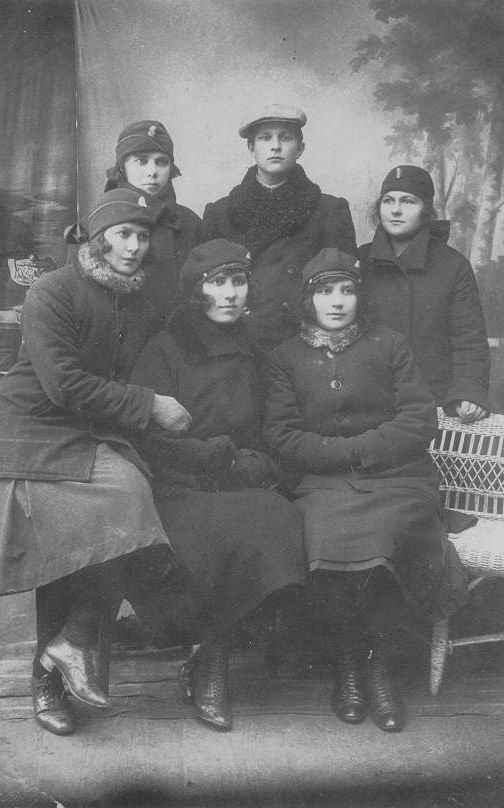
Gymnasium students

At the start of the gymnasium in October 1922, three higher classes from IV to VI were assembled, totaling 74 students. In the school year 1923/1924, the gymnasium conducted 5 classes from IV to VIII and one parallel class. It had 149 enrolled students, including 74 boys and 75 girls. In the school year 1924/1925, there were 183 enrolled students, with 93 boys and 90 girls. Thanks to the efforts of the gymnasium headmaster and the support of the Education Board of the Polesie District, classes for grades I, II, and III were launched at the beginning of the school year 1925/1926. The number of enrolled students reached 297, including 140 boys and 157 girls.

Students were required to dress in school uniforms for classes and Sunday services. These uniforms were made of dark blue cotton with white shiny buttons. Female students wore pleated skirts and blouses with long sleeves. The uniforms also included school badges and belts in either blue (for grades I–IV) or red (for grades V–VIII). Headgear was also part of the attire, with boys wearing peaked caps and girls wearing side caps. Metal badges adorned these caps, featuring an image of a torch against an open book background and the abbreviation G.P. (for Gimnazjum Państwowe). A tradition among students was to cut their caps with a razor blade just before graduation and give them to their chosen girls for embroidery.

Since education at the gymnasium was fee-based, while children of civil servants and teachers were eligible for discounts, students from civil servant families predominated. The fee system limited the opportunities for local Belarusians, who mostly belonged to lower-income groups, to access education at the gymnasium compared to Poles and Jews. According to Juras Zialewicz, director of the Prużański Pałacyk museum, 63% of students were Poles, 32% were Jews, 4% were Belarusians, 0.6% were Russians, and 0.5% were Germans. (Note: The number of Jewish students was proportionally lower than the number of Jews living in Pruzhany would suggest, since the city also had a Private Hebrew Gymnasium Tarbut.) 65% of students came from the city of Pruzhany, 23% from other towns in the Pruzhany district, and 12% from other parts of the Second Polish Republic. Among the parents of the students, 31% were civil servants, 18% were merchants, 7% were craftsmen, 6% were landowners, 6% were teachers, and the rest were industrialists, military personnel, and professionals.

=== Attitude towards national minorities ===
Memories of some former students of the gymnasium indicate that there were instances of intolerance shown by some teachers towards students belonging to the Belarusian minority. In one parent-teacher meeting, a father was told by a Polish language teacher that if he didn't speak to his daughter in Polish at home, she wouldn't finish school. On another occasion, the following incident occurred: after a student declared that her native language was Belarusian, the teacher first tried to convince her to change her declaration to Polish, and when she refused, he suggested she choose Russian because it's more beautiful. The student responded by asking to register her native language as French because they say it's the most beautiful.

According to the recollections of Pruzhany Žuk-Hryškievič, Belarusian students at the gymnasium spoke Polish during classes but switched to Belarusian after classes.

=== Notable students ===
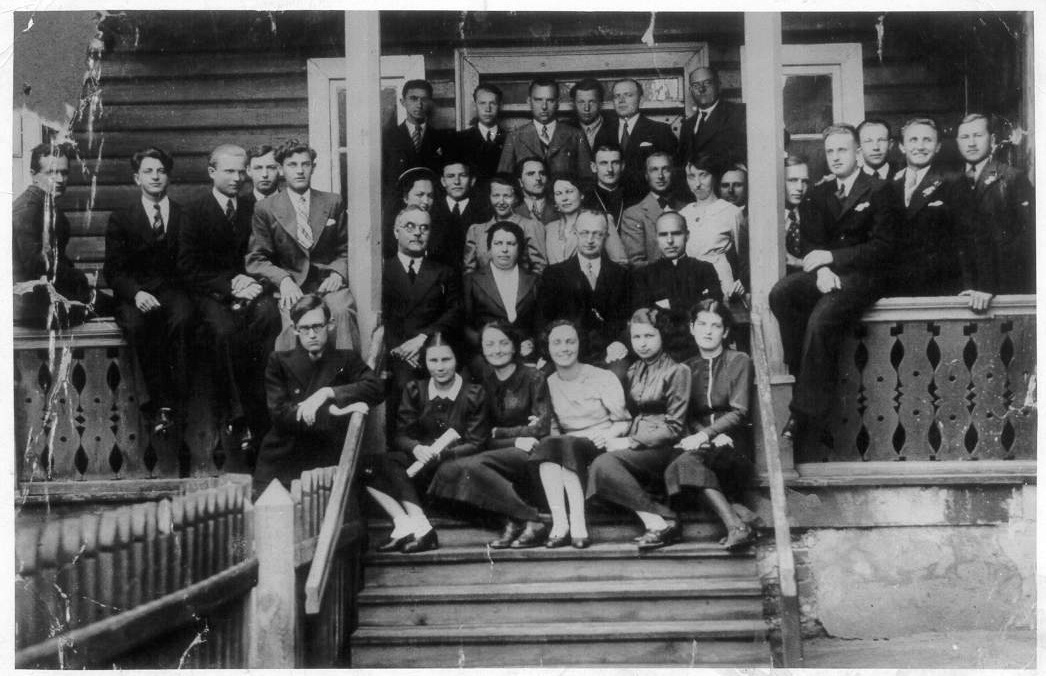
Students of the gymnasium before the maturity exam. Second from the right in the bottom row sits Raisa Žuk-Hryškievič

- Raisa Žuk-Hryškievič (1919–2009) – Belarusian teacher and independence activist, wife of the chairman of the Rada of the Belarusian Democratic Republic Vincent Žuk-Hryškievič.

== Banner ==
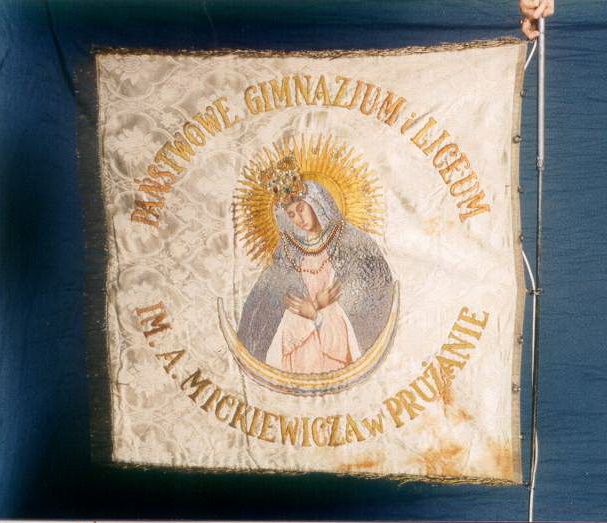
Front side of the banner

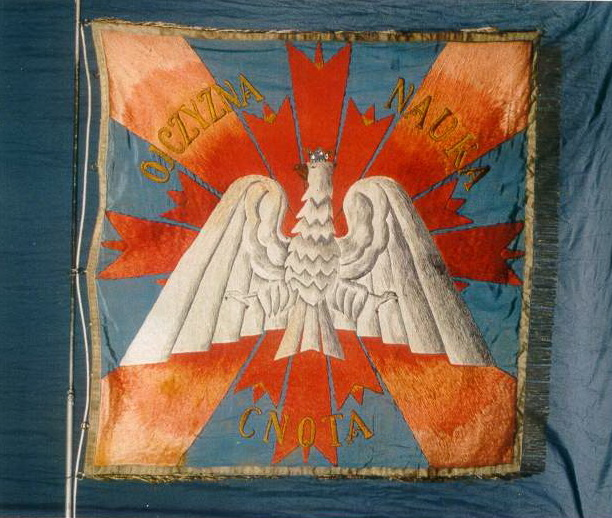
Back side of the banner

For the first 17 years of its existence, the gymnasium did not have a banner. In 1938 or at the beginning of 1939, parents of the students initiated the creation of one, and one of the teachers, Edward Bazan, took on the coordination of the project. The task of preparing the design was given to students as part of their drawing lessons. A special commission selected a design by a student named Żurado for implementation. On the front side, it depicts an image of the Our Lady of the Gate of Dawn surrounded by a circular golden inscription: PAŃSTWOWE GIMNAZJUM i LICEUM IM. A. MICKIEWICZA w PRUŻANIE on a pastel beige background with a delicate ornament. The back side features a stylized image of the White Eagle in a crown against a background of red rays and a blue field. The eagle is surrounded by a golden inscription: OJCZYZNA NAUKA CNOTA, which is a quote from Adam Mickiewicz's poem Pieśń filarecka. The edges of the banner are finished with golden edging and tassels. The flag was sewn by local nuns and then consecrated in the church and solemnly carried through the streets of the city.

After the Soviet Union's invasion of Poland and the transformation of the gymnasium into a Soviet school, the banner remained in the practical classes workshop for some time. However, Edward Bazan, persuaded by his colleague Jan Łozowski, decided to hide it. There was concern that the symbol of the gymnasium might not be welcomed by the Soviet authorities due to the presence of the image of Our Lady of the Gate of Dawn. Edward Bazan kept the banner hidden throughout the entire period of Soviet occupation and later under German occupation – first in the school building (in the workshop stove and under the stairs), then in his own home under the stairs, and finally, when he was evicted, in the Awłasewicz family's apartment, where he temporarily found shelter. Later, he took it with him during the evacuation with the German troops to Siedlce. There the banner went missing. Several years later, it unexpectedly resurfaced – it was left for Edward Bazan's son, Wiesław, in his workshop at the Diora factories in Dzierżoniów. Currently, it is kept by the youngest son of Wiesław in Wrocław.

== In culture ==
The gymnasium in Pruzhany is a common theme in poems, songs, and prose works, both professional and amateur, authored by former students of this institution. Some of these include: Jan Wójcik's prose Nad pięcioma rzekami (English: Above Five Rivers), Jerzy Michalewski's poem Zaduma (English: Contemplation), Franciszek Lachocki's poem Alma Mater znad Muchawca (English: Alma Mater from the Banks of the Muchawiec River), Anatol Werchoła's song Tango naszej młodości (English: Tango of Our Youth), Markiewiczówna-Mikołajczyk's poem Prużanianka – Wspomnienia (English: Pruzhany – Memories), and others.
