= Raisa Žuk-Hryškievič =

Belarusian cultural figure and politician (1919–2009)

- Раіса Жук-Грышкевіч
- Born: 22 October 1919; Pružany (now Brest Region of Belarus)
- Died: 2 April 2009; Barrie, Canada
- Resting place: Belarusian Cemetery in East Brunswick, New Jersey, U.S.
- Spouse: Vincent Žuk-Hryškievič

Raisa Žuk-Hryškievič (née Žukoŭskaja; Belarusian: Раіса Жук-Грышкевіч, IPA: [raˈjisa ˌʐuɡ‿ɣrɨʂˈkʲɛvʲit͡ʂ]; 22 October 1919 – 2 April 2009) was a prominent figure of the Belarusian diaspora.

== Early life ==
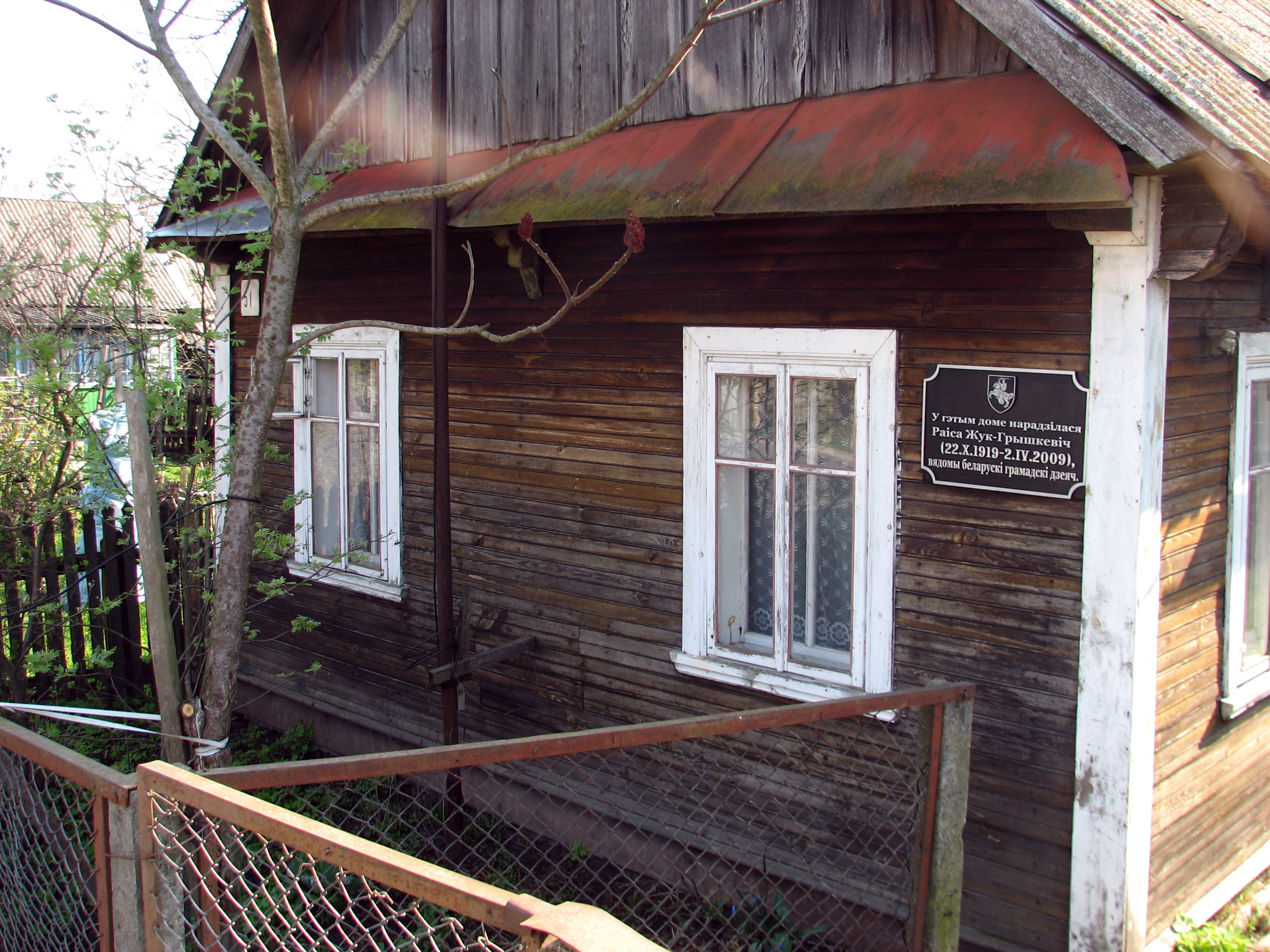
The house in Pružany, Belarus, where Raisa Žuk-Hryškievič was born

Žuk-Hryškievič was born on 22 October 1919 in Pružany (then Brest district within the Civil Administration of the Eastern Lands, a temporary Polish administrative region existing in 1919–20; now Brest Region of Belarus).

She finished a Polish primary school and Adam Mickiewicz gymnasium in her native Pružany before enrolling in the Belarusian Gymnasium in Vilna. In 1939 she embarked on a teaching career.

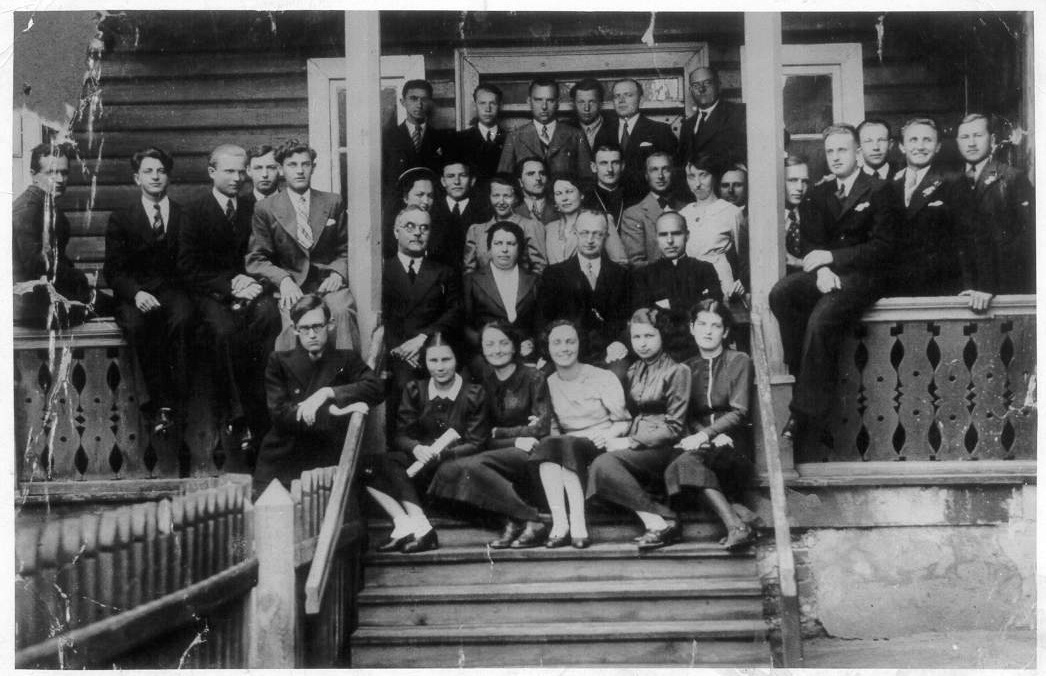
Graduates of Adam Mickiewicz Gimnazium in Pružany before examination. Žuk-Hryškievič is second on the left in the bottom row.

In 1949 Žuk-Hryškievič settled in the Canada. In 1953 she married Vincent Žuk-Hryškievič, a deputy chair of the Rada of the Belarusian Democratic Republic, and in 1954 graduated from the University of Toronto with a degree in dental surgery.

== Public life in the Belarusian diaspora ==
Apart from a successful dental practice, Žuk-Hryškievič became an active participant in Belarusian public life in Canada. She was one of the founders of the Belarusian Canadian Alliance. For many years she led the Coordination Council of Belarusians in Canada and published its newsletter Kamunikat (Belarusian: Камунікат).

Between 1965 and 1975 she headed the Union of Belarusian Women in Canada (Belarusian: Задзіночаньне беларускіх жанчын Канады), was the secretary and treasurer of the Belarusan Institute of Arts and Sciences in Canada and a member of the International Association of Scholars in Belarusian Studies.

In 1973 as a representative of the Belarusian community Žuk-Hryškievič was invited by the Canadian government to join the Canadian Consultative Council on Multiculturalism.

In 1978 she became a member of the Rada of the Belarusian Democratic Republic and in 1997 a member of the Rada's Executive Council.

== Belarusian Cross and Memorial at the Martyrs' Shrine ==
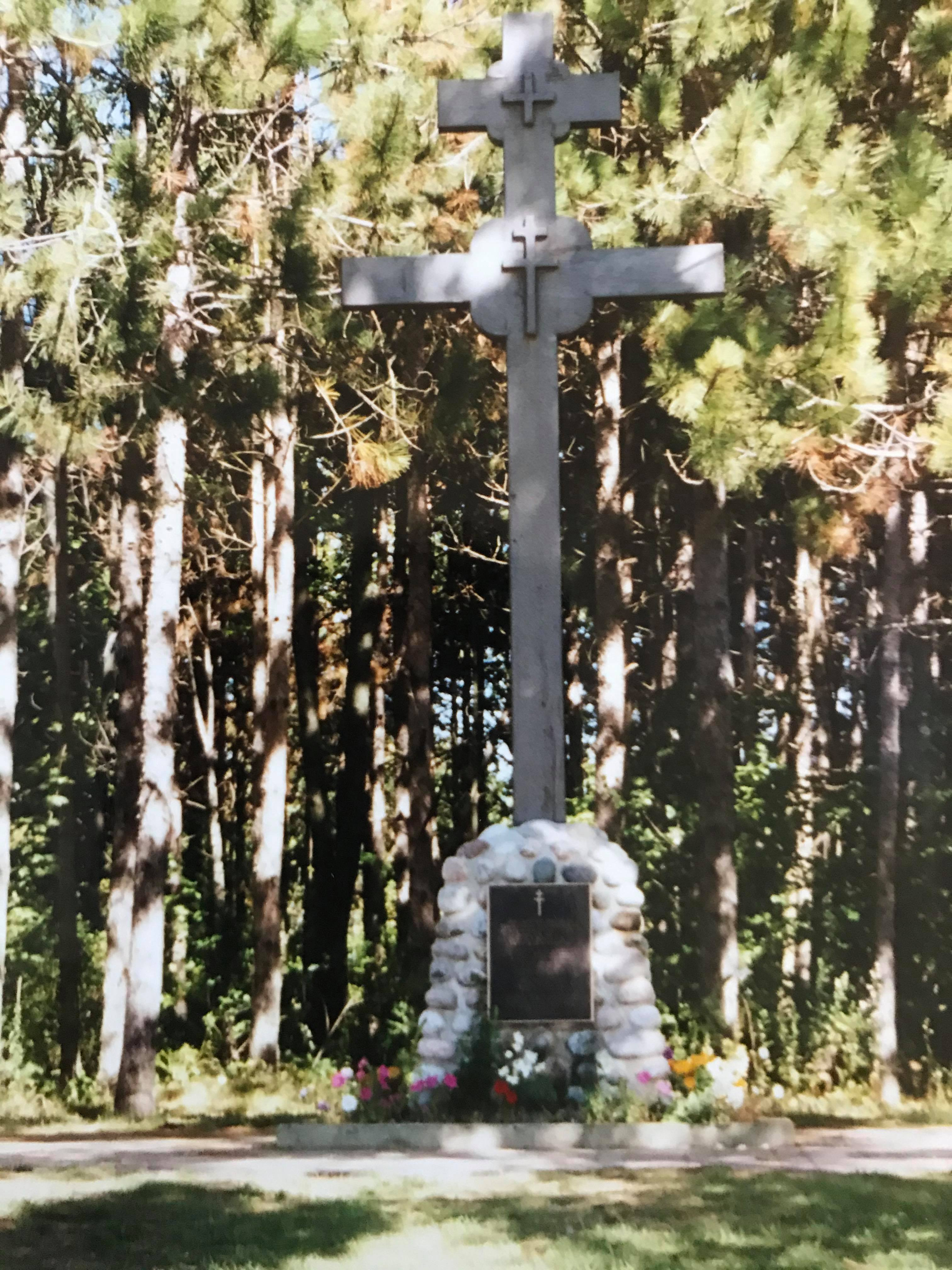
Belarusian Cross at the Martyrs' Shrine. Midland, Ontario, Canada

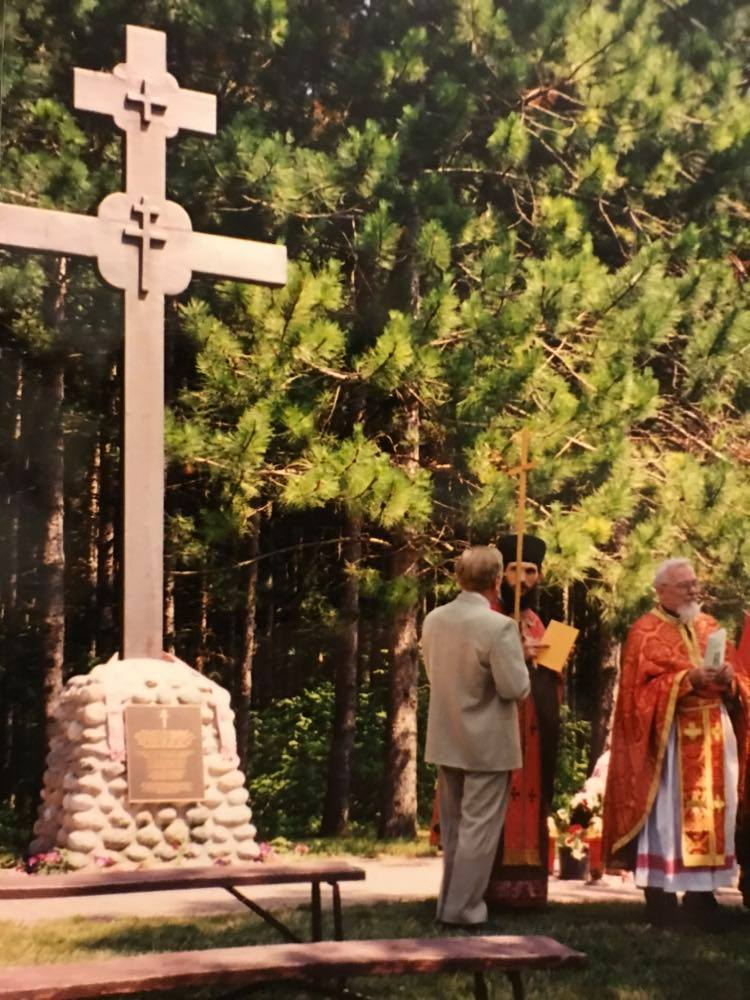
Mgr Alexander Nadson is praying near the Cross. 1996.

In 1988 Žuk-Hryškievič and her husband were instrumental in the erection of a memorial cross at the Martyrs' Shrine in Midland, Ontario. The cross was installed in commemoration of the first millennium of Christianity in Belarus and shortly followed by an adjacent monument dedicated to victims of the Communist terror in Belarus.

The cross and monument were sanctified by Mgr Alexander Nadson, Apostolic Visitor for Belarusian Catholics abroad.

The cross is used as a place of pilgrimage by the Belarusian community in Canada.

== Death and resting place ==
Žuk-Hryškievič died on 2 April 2009 and was buried next to Vincent Žuk-Hryškievič in the Belarusian Cemetery in East Brunswick, New Jersey, USA.

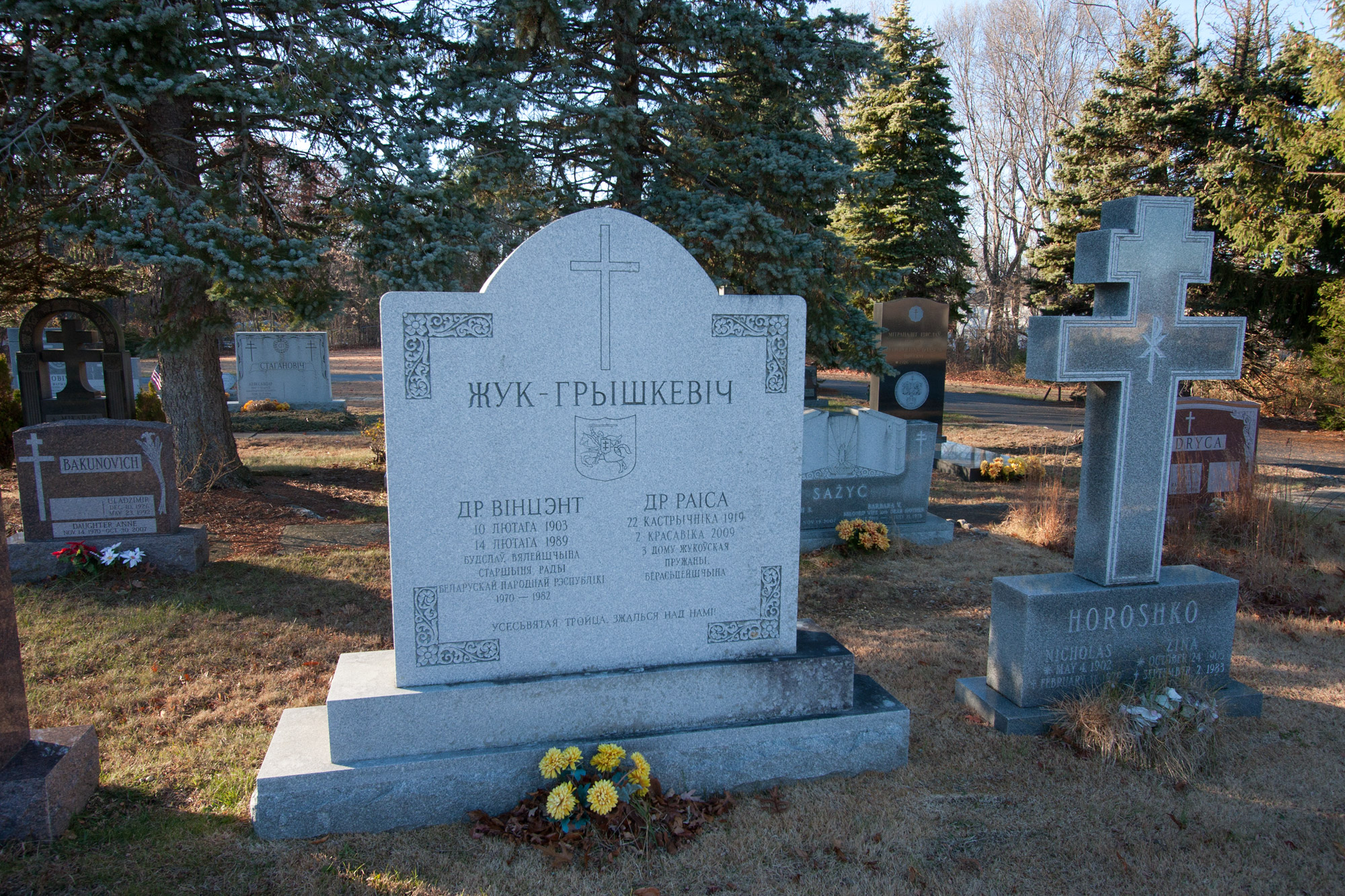
Graves of Vincent Žuk-Hryškievič and his wife Raisa Žuk-Hryškievič in Belarusian Saint Mary of Žyrovičy Cemetery in New Brunswick, New Jersey, USA.

== See also ==
=== Archives ===
There is a Raisa Zuk-Hryskievic fonds at Library and Archives Canada. The archival reference number is R4894.
