= Lavon Rydleŭski =

Belarusian activist

Liavon Rydleŭski
- Лявон Рыдлеўскі
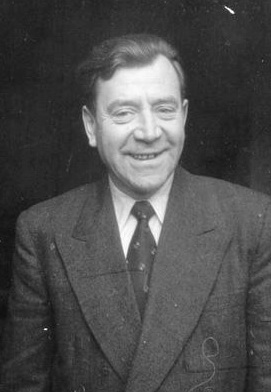
- Born: 14 October 1903; Uljanavičy, Mogilev province of the Russian Empire (now Viciebsk Region of Belarus)
- Died: 24 October 1953 (aged 50); London
- Resting place: Hampstead Cemetery, London

Lavon Rydleŭski (Belarusian: Лявон Рыдлеўскі; 14 October 1903 - 24 October 1953) was an active participant in the Belarusian independence movement and anti-Soviet resistance and a prominent member of the Belarusian diaspora.

== Early life ==
Rydleŭski was born in the village of Uljanavičy, Mogilev province of the Russian Empire (now Viciebsk Region of Belarus). In 1917-20 he studied in the Slucak gymnasium and was a member of a cultural and educational group 'Fern Flower' (Belarusian: Папараць-кветка).

In 1923 he graduated from the Belarusian Gymnasium in Vilna and in 1929 a polytechnic institute in Poděbrady, Czechoslovakia.

== Participation in Belarusian independence movement ==
Rydleŭski was one of the youngest combatants in the Slucak Uprising of 1920, an anti-Bolshevik pro-independence military campaign in central Belarus. In 1921 he participated in anti-Soviet armed resistance in the Paleśsie region, southern Belarus.

== In exile ==
After his studies in Czechoslovakia, Rydleŭski moved to France where he founded and headed the Union of Belarusian Working Emigrants in France (Belarusian: Хаўрус беларускай працоўнай эміграцыі ў Францыі).

During World War II, he obtained permission for Belarusians to serve in the French Foreign Legion and participated in the French Resistance.

After the war he published a newspaper "Belarusian News" (Belarusian: Беларускія навіны) and became a Vice-President of the Rada of the Belarusian Democratic Republic. In 1948 he was elected the chair of the International Union of Belarusians in Exile (Belarusian: Сусьветнаe аб'яднаньнe беларускай эміграцыі).

== Death and memory ==
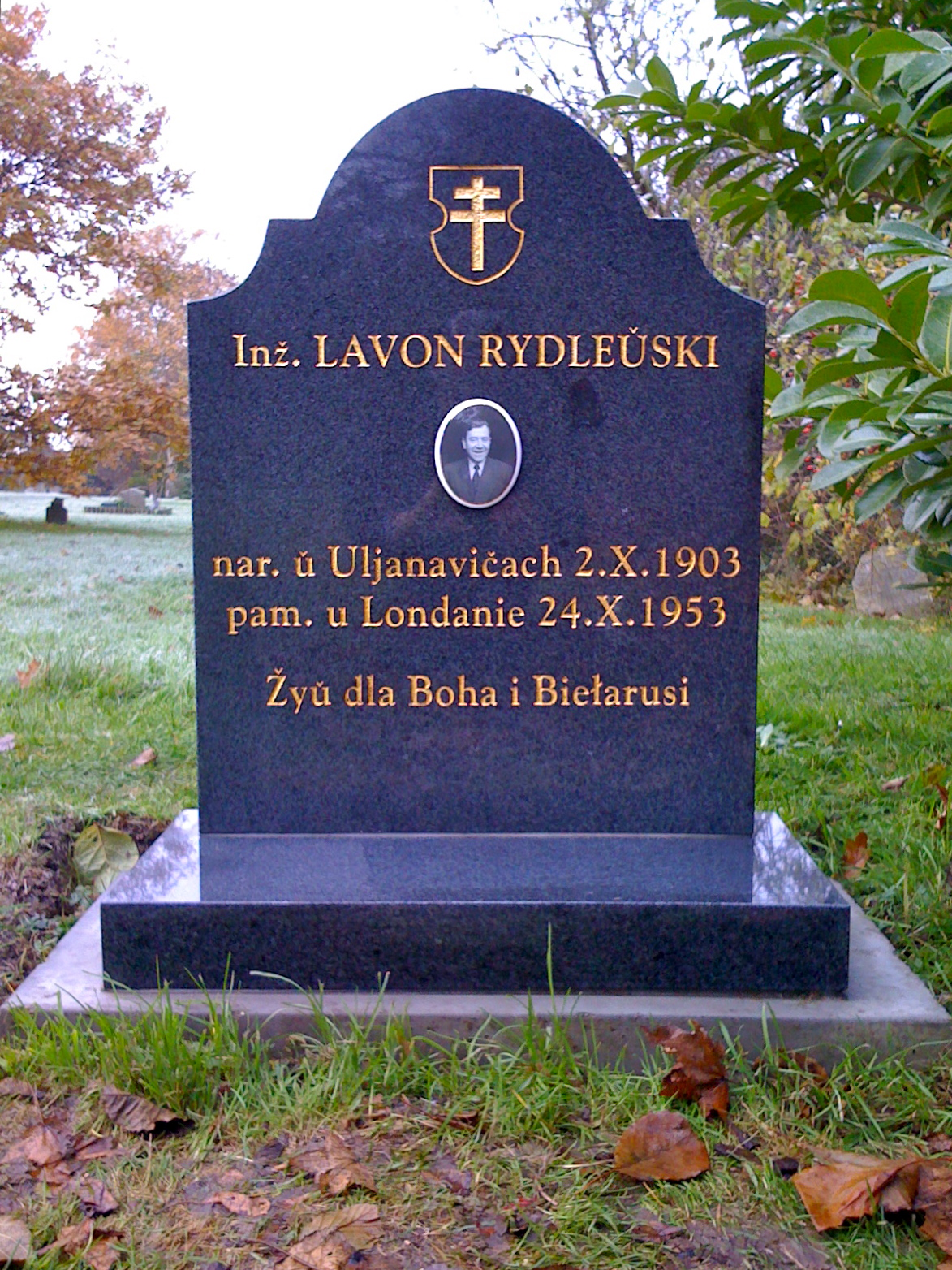
The tombstone on Rydleŭski's grave in the Hampstead cemetery in London

Rydleŭski died on 24 October 1953 and is buried in the Hampstead cemetery in London.

On 27 November 2010, an anniversary of the Słucak Uprising, the Association of Belarusians in Great Britain installed a new tombstone on his grave. Rydleŭski's resting place has since been used by the Belarusian community as a meeting place for commemorative events.
