= Belarusian Gymnasium of Vilnia =

Coordinates: 54.6833°N 25.2833°E

Belarusian Gymnasium of Vilnia Belarusian: Віленская беларуская гімназія

Location
- Vilnius; Lithuania

Information
- Established: 1919
- Closed: 1944

The Belarusian Gymnasium of Vilnia (Belarusian: Віленская беларуская гімназія) was an important Belarusian school in Vilnius. Many notable Belarusian cultural figures of the 20th century graduated from the school.

== History ==
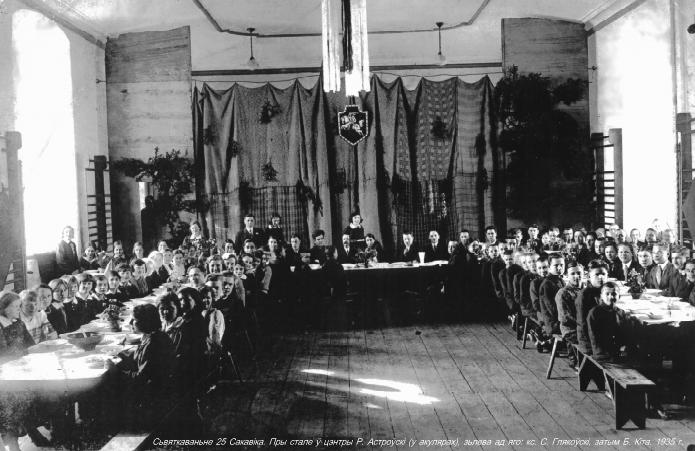
Celebration of an anniversary of the Belarusian Democratic Republic in the Belarusian Gymnasium of Vilnia in 1935

In January 1919, the Lithuanian Minister of Education, Mykolas Biržiška, issued an order to establish the first Belarusian gymnasium in Vilnius. The gymnasium officially commenced classes on February 1, 1919. During the Interbellum, the school was located at Monastery of the Holy Trinity in Vilnius. Prior to their retreat from the city to Kaunas, Lithuanians allowed opening of the gymnasium in the premises of the former Basilian monastery. The lessons started on 1 February 1919.

In the first year of its existence the school also served as an Orphanage for children from surrounding regions. After the Soviet occupation of Republic of Lithuania in 1944 the school was closed down. It was reestablished after the Collapse of the USSR as the Francishak Skaryna Belarusian School of Vilnius.

== Teachers ==
- Radasłaŭ Astroŭski, Principal from 1924 to 1936; formerly Education Minister of the Belarusian Democratic Republic in 1918 and head of the Belarusian Central Rada after 1944
- Barys Kit, teacher since 1933, Principal in 1939. Later notable scientist in the United States and member of the Belarusian American community

== Alumni and students ==
- Michał Vituška, general and military commander
- Vincent Žuk-Hryškievič, president of the Belarusian Democratic Republic in exile
- Raisa Žuk-Hryškievič
- Jan Stankievič, linguist, historian and philosopher
- Maxim Tank, poet and translator
- Boris Koverda, White Russian assassin, killer of Pyotr Voykov (left school before graduation)
- Lavon Rydleŭski, Vice-President of the Rada of the Belarusian Democratic Republic
- Natallia Arsiennieva, playwright, poet, translator, author of the lyrics to the hymn "Mahutny Boža” (Almighty God)
