= Charles Huot =

Canadian artist (1855-1930)

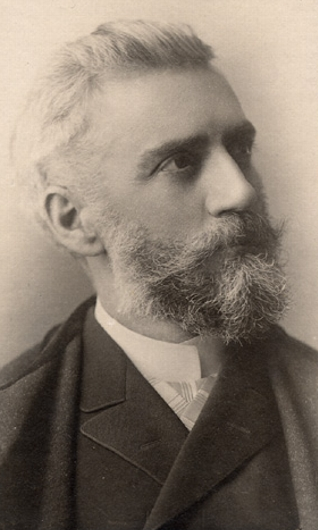
- Huot c. 1900
- Born: Charles Édouard Masson Huot; April 6, 1855; Québec City, United Province of Canada
- Died: January 27, 1930 (aged 74); Sillery, Québec City, Quebec
- Known for: Painter and illustrator

Charles Édouard Masson Huot (6 April 1855 – 27 January 1930) was a French-Canadian painter and illustrator based in Quebec City.

== Biography ==
Huot was born in Quebec City, the son of a merchant. Having demonstrated a talent for drawing at an early age, he was enrolled in the Collège de Sainte-Anne-de-la-Pocatière when he was only ten. He later attended the École normale Laval. The local Abbé was impressed with his talents and set up a subscription committee to raise funds for him to study in Europe. In 1874, he moved to Paris, where he attended the École des Beaux-arts and studied in the workshop of Alexandre Cabanel. He participated in numerous exhibitions there (including the Salon in 1876) and his painting of "The Good Samaritan" was purchased by Patrice MacMahon on behalf of the French Government in 1878. He married Louise Schlachter in 1885, returned to Canada in 1886 on the promise of a large commission and settled in Quebec City.

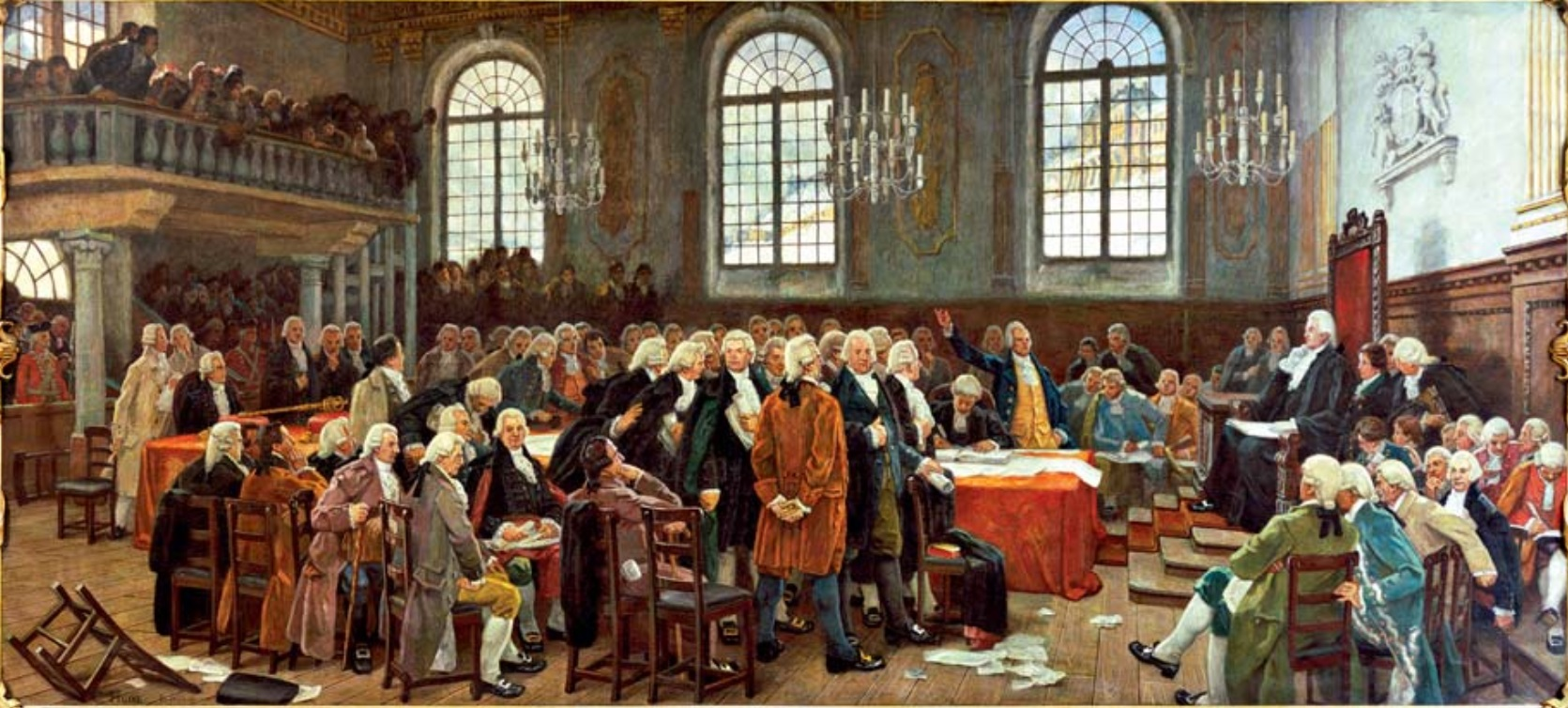
The Debate on Languages

Back in Québec, his career truly began when he received that commission to decorate the Church of the Holy Savior in 1887. After a brief return to Paris to retrieve his wife and daughter, there were several more commissions of a religious nature. In 1903, he travelled to Europe with his family, visiting his wife's parents in Germany, and Italy, where he honed his skills studying with Francesco Gai. He returned to Canada in 1904, alone. Details for this period in his life are rather sketchy. The following year, he rejoined his family in Brussels and lived in Saint-Malo, France. In 1907, his wife died and he brought his daughter back to Canada.

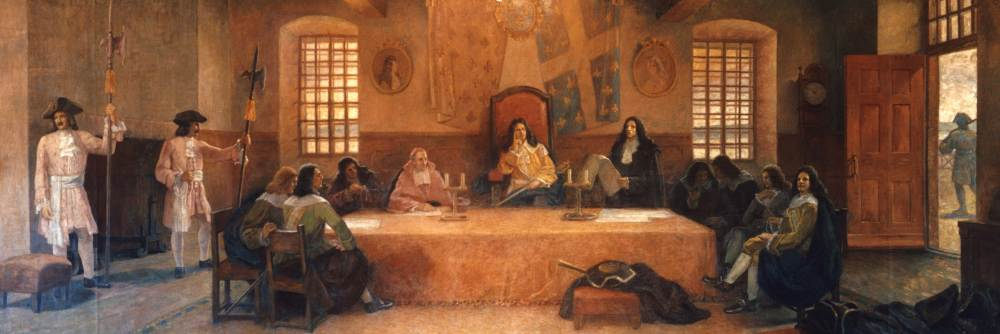
The Sovereign Council

=== The Parliament Building ===
In 1910, he was selected by a committee (consisting of Thomas Chapais, Eugène-Étienne Taché and Ernest Myrand) to compose two large historical paintings for the Parliament Building ("Sovereign Council" and the "Debate on Languages"), executed between 1910 and 1913, with an occasional break to do research. This commission launched Huot to new heights in his career, achieving fame from such a high profile piece. This produced another commission for a painting on the theme Je me souviens (Québec's motto) for the building's ceiling. It would take him another seven years to prepare and finish this work. At the time of his death, he was engaged in another large commission for the building, that had to be completed by his students.

Among his illustrations are those for L'Art d'être grand-père by Victor Hugo.

He died in 1930 in Sillery.
