= Marcel-Marie Desmarais =

Roman Catholic priest

Marcel-Marie Desmarais, (April 6, 1908, Montreal – July 16, 1994, Montreal), was a Quebec writer, preacher and broadcaster. A member of the Roman Catholic Dominican Order, he became a personality through his popular books and radio and TV programs (CKAC et Radio-Canada) in Quebec. He was also sent as missionary to Brazil during the 1940s.

In 1986 Desmarais won the Eugene Piccard Award for The Magic of the Past (La Magie du Passé).

== Selected works ==
- Le Bonheur, cet inconnu : moyens pratiques pour vivre heureux in libraries (WorldCat catalog)
- S. Albert le grand, docteur de la médiation mariale in libraries (WorldCat catalog)
- Catholiques d'aujourd'hui, radio-causeries in libraries (WorldCat catalog)
- L'amour à l'âge atomique in libraries (WorldCat catalog)
- Capsules of Optimism (Sister Maria Regina translation) in libraries (WorldCat catalog)
- La magie du passé in libraries (WorldCat catalog)
