= Ernest Myrand =

Canadian librarian (1854–1921)

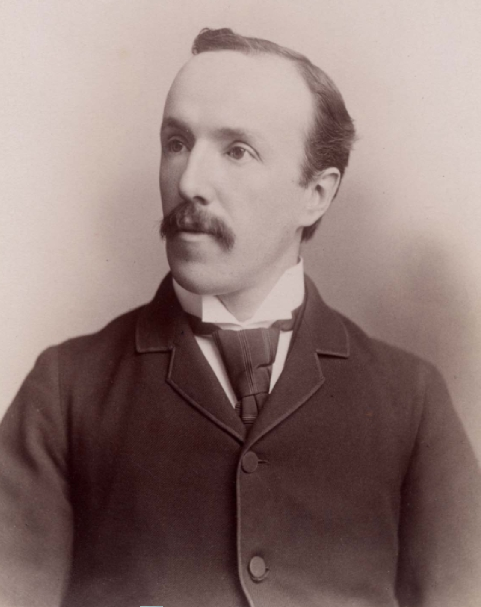
- Born: Joseph Dominque Ernest Myrand; June 29, 1854; Quebec City, Quebec
- Died: May 31, 1921 (aged 66); Quebec City, Quebec
- Education: Université Laval
- Occupations: Journalist; Author; Librarian
- Spouse: Émélie-Wilhelmine Lafrance (m. 1880)

Joseph Dominque Ernest Myrand (June 29, 1854 – May 31, 1921) was a Canadian journalist, author and librarian from Quebec.

== Biography ==
Myrand was born in Quebec City on June 29, 1854. He was the son of Louis-Japhet Myrand and Marie-Anne-Adélaïde Marmette.

He studied at the Séminaire de Québec and the Université Laval, and graduated soon after. Myrand married Émélie-Wilhelmine Lafrance in 1880. He then went and joined the newspaper company Le Canadien under supervision from Israël Tarte. In 1912 he became the librarian of the Quebec Legislative Assembly.

On December 31, 1912, Myrand was appointed as the Director of the Library of the Legislature. He later published the Noëls anciens de la Nouvelle-France in 1913. Myrand served until his death on May 31, 1921. He was 66.
