= Roland Guilbault =

Roland George "Gil" Guilbault (November 27, 1934 – April 6, 2012) was an American U.S. Navy rear admiral who commanded the USS Ticonderoga, the first Aegis cruiser. In 1987, he served as a battle force commander aboard the USS Eisenhower. He retired as a rear admiral in 1994.

He obtained degrees from George Washington University and Université de Montréal. Guilbault served in the Navy for 34 years and later held executive positions with Lucent Technologies and Digital Equipment Corporation.
