= Barys Kit =

Belarusian-American rocket scientist

- Барыс Кіт
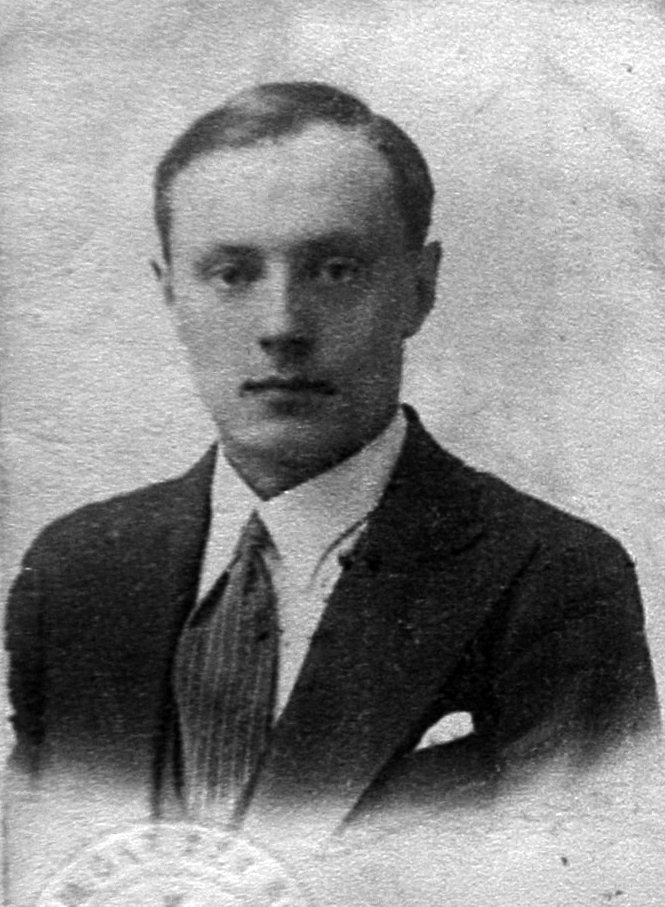
- Kit in 1935
- Born: April 6, 1910; Saint Petersburg, Russian Empire
- Died: February 1, 2018 (aged 107); Frankfurt am Main, Germany
- Education: Vilnius University; University of Regensberg
- Known for: "Rocket Propellant Handbook"

Barys Kit (Note: Belarusian: Барыс Уладзіміравіч Кіт, romanized: Barys Uladzimiravich Kit; Russian: Борис Владимирович Кит, romanized: Boris Vladimirovich Kit) (April 6, 1910 – February 1, 2018) was a Belarusian-American rocket scientist.

== Biography ==
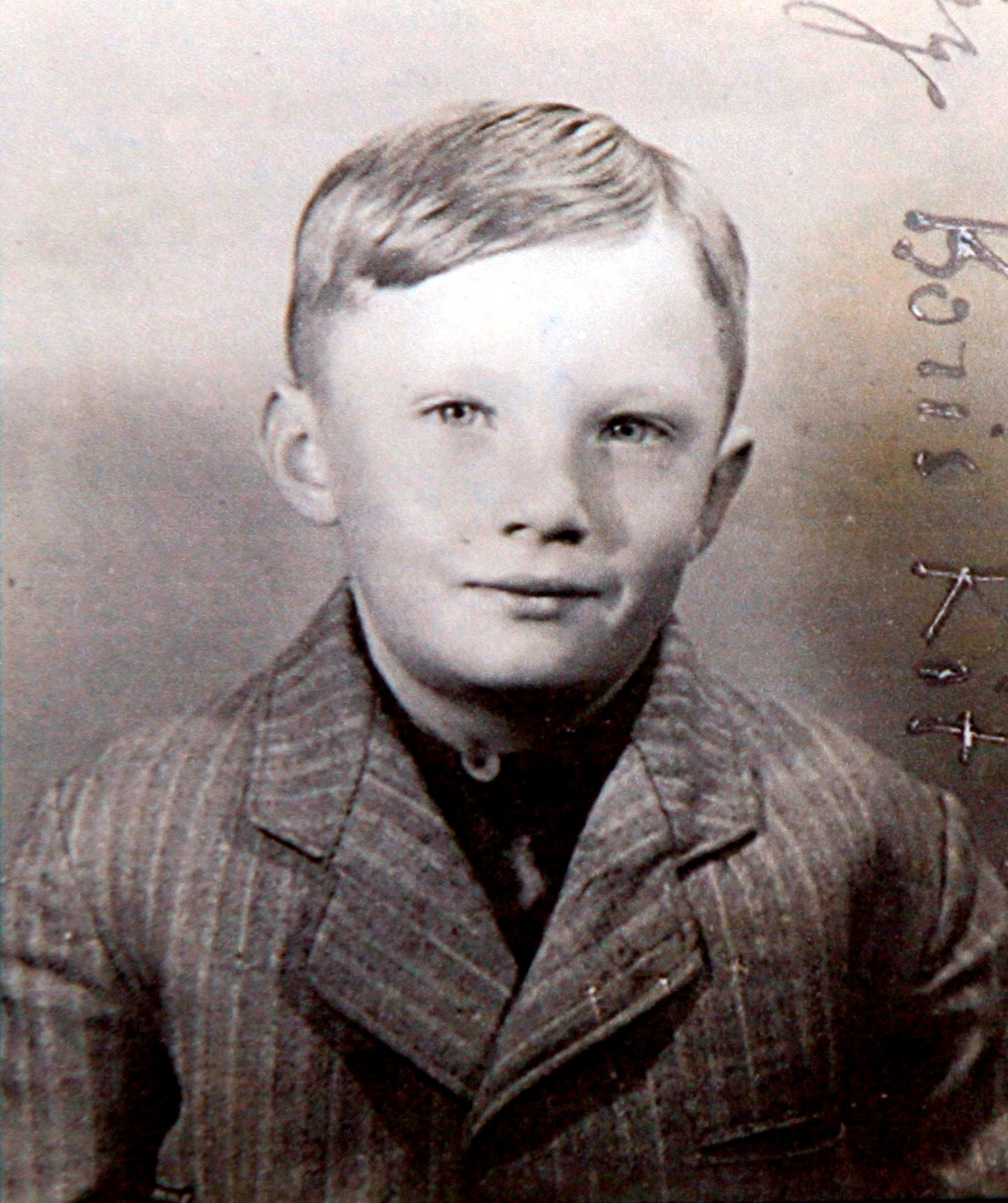
Barys Kit as a child (1920)

Kit was born on April 6, 1910, in Saint Petersburg, Russian Empire to the family of an employee at the Post and Telegraph Department of Belarusian origin. His true surname is Kita. In 1918 Kit's family moved to their native village of Aharodniki, now the town of Karelichy, Grodno Region. In 1921 this area became a part of the Second Polish Republic.

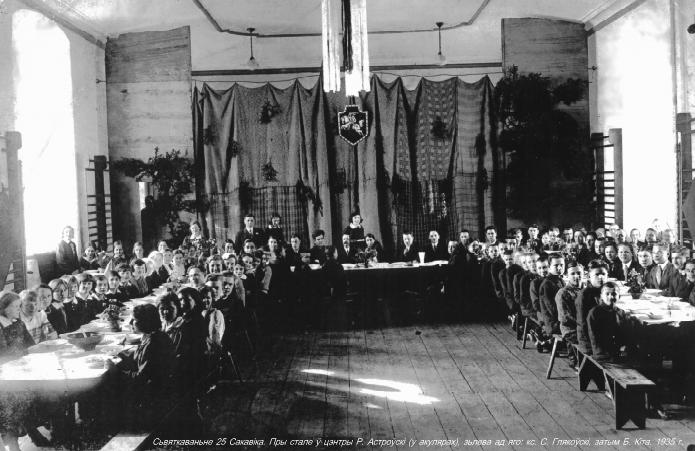
Celebration of an anniversary of the Belarusian Democratic Republic in the Belarusian Gymnasium of Vilnia in 1935. At the table in the center is principal Radasłaŭ Astroŭski (wearing glasses), to his left Stanisłau Głakouski, and then Barys Kit.

After graduation from the Navahrudak Belarusian Lyceum in 1928, Kit entered the physics and mathematics faculty of Vilnius University. After graduation in 1933 he worked as a teacher at the Belarusian Gymnasium of Vilnia in Vilnius. In 1939 he was appointed its Principal.

=== Second World War ===
After World War II had begun and the Vilnius Region had been handed over to Lithuania, Kit returned to his native region which had been joined to the Byelorussian SSR. He was the Principal of Navahrudak Belarusian High School there and later a superintendent of a large school system district. Hundreds of elementary schools and several dozen high schools were opened in the region within a year due to Kit's direct participation.

Kit worked as a teacher in the village of Lebedzeva near Maladzyechna and later as a director of the Pastavy Teachers College during the Nazi occupation of Belarus. Under his leadership, students received not only vocational training but also a broad education in Belarusian history and culture and structured the curriculum according to a college-level program. This was kept hidden from the German occupiers, and when they discovered it, Kit narrowly avoided an arrest. One of the students of Kit remembers: "The school lacked any political orientation. Hitler and his Army were never praised. Germans never stepped over the school's threshold. Neither were Stalin and Bolshevism criticised. Everybody understood that the Nazis must be expelled from our land. But in the post-war period, the Soviet authorities severely persecuted the teachers of this type of school. Probably because of this, Kit decided to leave Belarus."

Kit was suspected of having partisan connections and was arrested by the German SD punitive bodies. He spent a month in prison and was saved from execution by his former pupil Kanstantsin Kasiak. Kit described in an interview that Kasiak helped a lot of Belarusians to get out of German prisons, but he was hanged after the arrival of the Red Army.

=== Emigration ===
In 1944, Kit and his family, with the retreating German army moved to Germany, first to Opfenbach near Lindau in Bavaria, then to Munich. In 1948 Kit emigrated to the United States. In 1950 he settled in Los Angeles and worked there as a chemist in various companies.

In the mid-1950s Kit began his scientific activities in the field of astronautics. He worked for 25 years in the American space research program. As a mathematician and systems analyst, he took part in projects aimed at the development of intercontinental missile systems. Kit took part in multiple American space research projects, including the development of the mathematical apparatus behind the mission to the Moon. In 1972 Kit moved to Frankfurt-am-Main in Germany and decided to pursue a career in Europe. He began teaching mathematics at the European College of the University of Maryland at Heidelberg in 1973, where he started a thesis on the work of mathematician and professor at Vilnius University Antoni Zygmund.

Kit assisted his friend Juri Popko in establishing a Belarusian museum in the German city of Leimen. He contributed to expanding the museum’s collection and engaged with local authorities, which led to its official opening in 1982. It was closed after the death of Juri Popko.

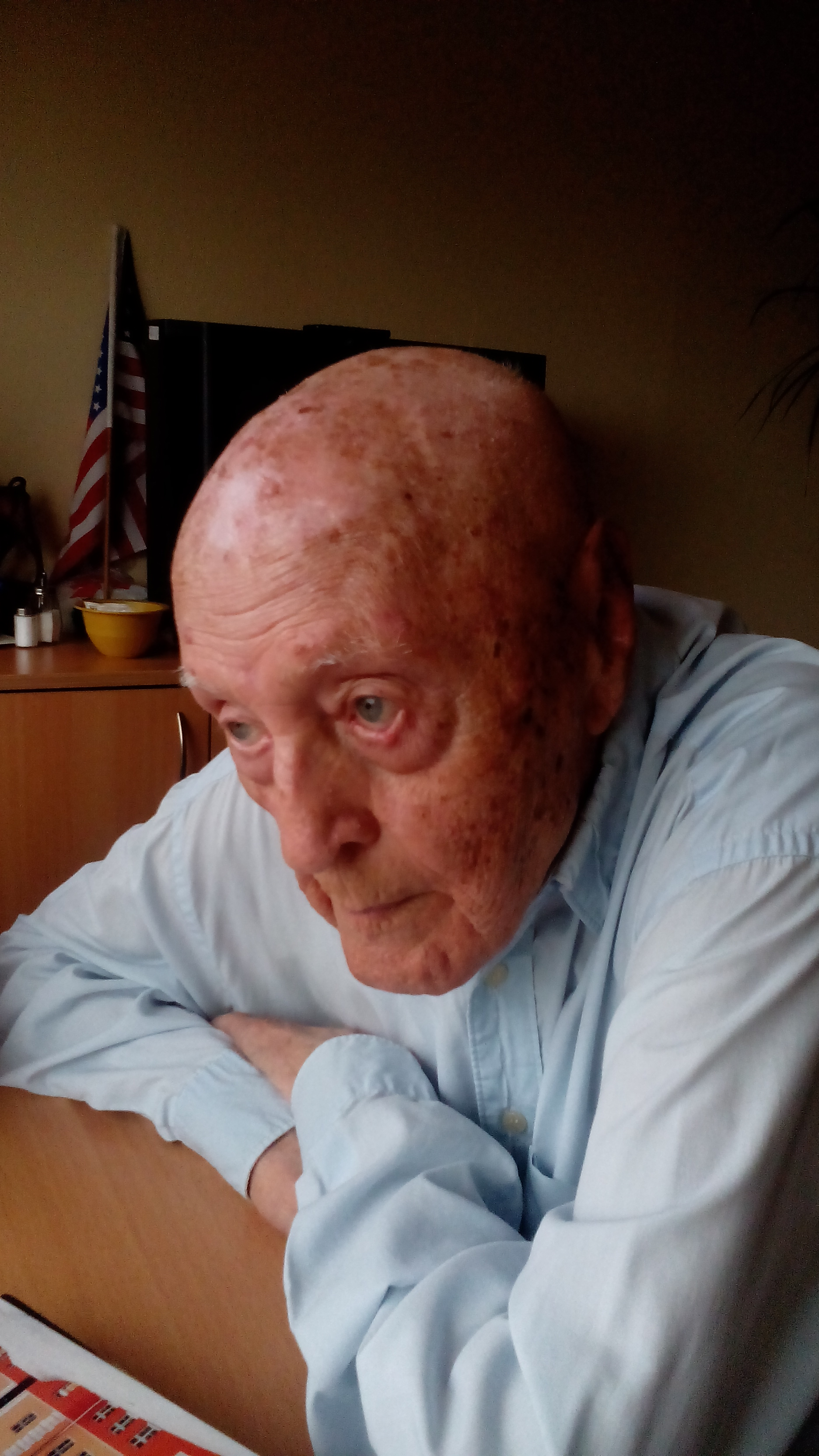
Kit in 2015

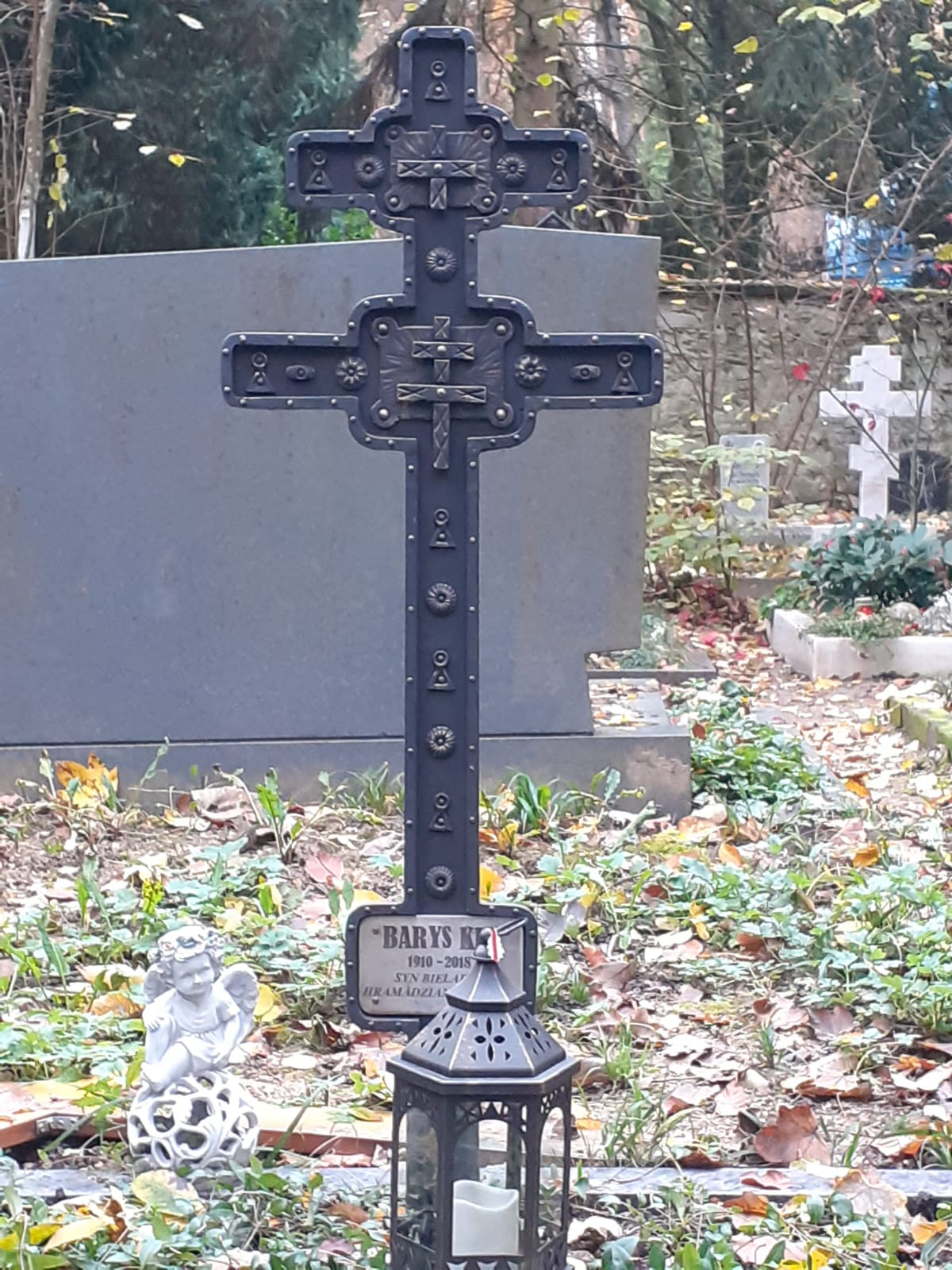
Grave cross of Barys Kit at the Russian Cemetery on the Neroberg near Wiesbaden

In his final years, Kit spoke critically about the conditions under the regime of Alexander Lukashenko and stated: “I wish only one thing: I want Belarus to become free from all those unwanted things that have been happening recently.”

Despite his emigration, Kit stayed a conscious Belarusian through all his life: "Everything I did in my life — I did for my homeland and its fame". He lived out his final years in a Jewish nursing home and celebrated his 107th birthday in 2017. He died on February 1, 2018.

== Scientific achievements ==
Kit is the author of the first manual on rocket propellant "Rocket Propellant Handbook", published by McMillan in 1960. The book received many positive reviews and is referenced in rocket science publications even today. In 1982 Kit earned a Ph.D. in mathematics and science history from the University of Regensburg.

Kit was a long-standing member of the American Institute of Aeronautics and Astronautics, an honorary member of the Hermann Oberth German Astronautics Society Board of Directors, a member of the International Astronautics Academy in Paris, Vice-President of the Eurasian International Astronautics Academy, Professor Emeritus of Maryland University, Honorary Doctorate of Science of Hrodna State University, and Navahrudak's honorable resident.

== Legacy ==
Kits' name appears on a list of distinguished figures in a "time capsule" that has been embedded in the wall of the United States Capitol in Washington.

A school in the Belarusian city of Navahrudak bears a museum in honor of Barys Kit. Until 2019, it was named after the rocket scientist. A memorial plaque is dedicated to him.

Poet Ryhor Baradulin wrote a poem in honor of Barys Kit.

== Publications ==
- Boris Kit, Douglas S. Evered. Rocket Propellant Handbook. The Macmillan Company, 1960.
