= Vincent Žuk-Hryškievič =

Belarusian exile politician (1903–1989)

- Вінцэнт Жук-Грышкевіч
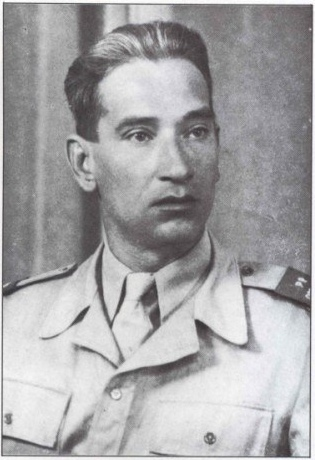

President of the Rada of the Belarusian Democratic Republic-in-exile
- In office May 1970 – November 1980
- Preceded by: Mikoła Abramčyk
- Succeeded by: Jazep Sažyč

Personal details
- Born: February 10, 1903 Budslaŭ, Minsk, Russian Empire
- Died: February 14, 1989 (aged 86) Barrie, Ontario, Canada
- Party: Independent
- Spouse: Raisa Žuk-Hryškievič
- Children: 1
- Education: Charles University in Prague, University of Ottawa
- Profession: Historian, lecturer
- Awards: Defence Medal (United Kingdom); 1939–1945 Star; Italy Star; Monte Cassino Commemorative Cross

Vincent Žuk-Hryškievič (Belarusian: Вінцэнт Жук-Грышкевіч; Polish: Wincenty Żuk-Hryszkiewicz; February 10, 1903 – February 14, 1989) was a Belarusian emigre politician. He was president of the government-in-exile of the Belarusian Democratic Republic between 1970 and 1982.

== Early life and education ==
Žuk-Hryškievič was born on February 10, 1903, in Budslaŭ, Belarus (then part of the Russian Empire). He did his primary education at a Belarusian gymnasium in his hometown, until its closure. He completed his secondary education at the Belarusian Gymnasium of Vilnia, from which he graduated in 1922.

He graduated from the Charles University in Prague in 1926. He worked as teacher in the Belarusian Gymnasium of Vilnia between 1927 and 1939, during which he was also active in West Belarusian politics, including work for a newspaper published by the Belarusian Peasants' and Workers' Union.

In late September 1939, after the Soviet invasion of Poland, Žuk-Hryškievič was first appointed editor in a Soviet newspaper, although he was subsequently arrested by the NKVD. After several months of tortures, he was sent to Gulag concentration camps in Kotlas and Vorkuta.

In 1942 he was set free as a Polish citizen and fought in the Anders' Army in Egypt and in Italy, including the Battle of Monte Cassino.

== Post-war career ==
After World War II, Žuk-Hryškievič first settled in the United Kingdom where together with other Belarusian veterans of the Anders Army he became one of the founders of the Association of Belarusians in Great Britain.

In 1950, he moved to Canada and actively participated in Belarusian activities in North America as one of the leaders of the Belarusian Canadian Alliance. In 1952, he earned a Ph.D. in Literature at the University of Ottawa.

He moved to Munich, West Germany, at the invitation of President Mikoła Abramčyk, where he established and managed the Belarusian section of Radio Liberty. He made the first broadcast to his homeland on May 20, 1954, and remained with the programme until April 1956 when he returned to Toronto.

== Personal life ==
Žuk-Hryškievič was married to Raisa Žuk-Hryškievič (née Žukoŭskaja; 1919–2009), a member of the Rada of the Belarusian Democratic Republic. They have one daughter together.

He died on February 14, 1989, in Barrie, Ontario – four days after his 86th birthday.
