= Elsa Pollak =

Slovakian-born Israeli sculptor and Holocaust survivor

Elsa Pollak אלסה פולק
- Born: 1911; Markušovce, Austria-Hungary
- Died: 2006 (aged 94–95); Herzliya, Israel
- Known for: Statues portraying the Holocaust
- Notable work: The Pit, Auschwitz 5170
- Awards: 1992 Sussman Prize for Artists Depicting the Holocaust, Yad Vashem

Elsa Pollak (Hebrew: אלסה פולק; 1911–2006) was an Israeli sculptor and a Holocaust survivor, born in Slovakia. She is known for depicting the victims of the Holocaust in her art.

== Life ==
Pollak was born in the village of Markušovce. In 1944, she was deported to Auschwitz along with her entire family and assigned the number 5170. She was the only survivor, being liberated from the labor camp of Lenzing, Austria, after having partaken in the death march from Auschwitz.

After the end of World War II, Elsa studied sculpture in Vienna along with the sculptor and painter Kurt Goebel. In 1962, she emigrated to Israel and settled in Herzliya. In 1991, she received the Sussman Prize for Artists Depicting the Holocaust awarded by Yad Vashem.

== Works ==
Pollak co-authored The Pit memorial, along with Belarus artist Leonid Levin, located at the site where Nazi forces shot about 5,000 Jewish residents of the nearby Minsk Ghetto.

Her sculpture exhibition Elsa Pollak: Auschwitz 5170, named after her prisoner number in Auschwitz, is one of the two permanent exhibitions displayed at the Ghetto Fighters' House in Israel.

In her art, she drew from her own experience at the Auschwitz concentration camp, in her own words: "Man created these horrors, but did not invent a language in which to describe them. The memories stayed alive and urged me on without respite. And thus I arrived at sculpture."

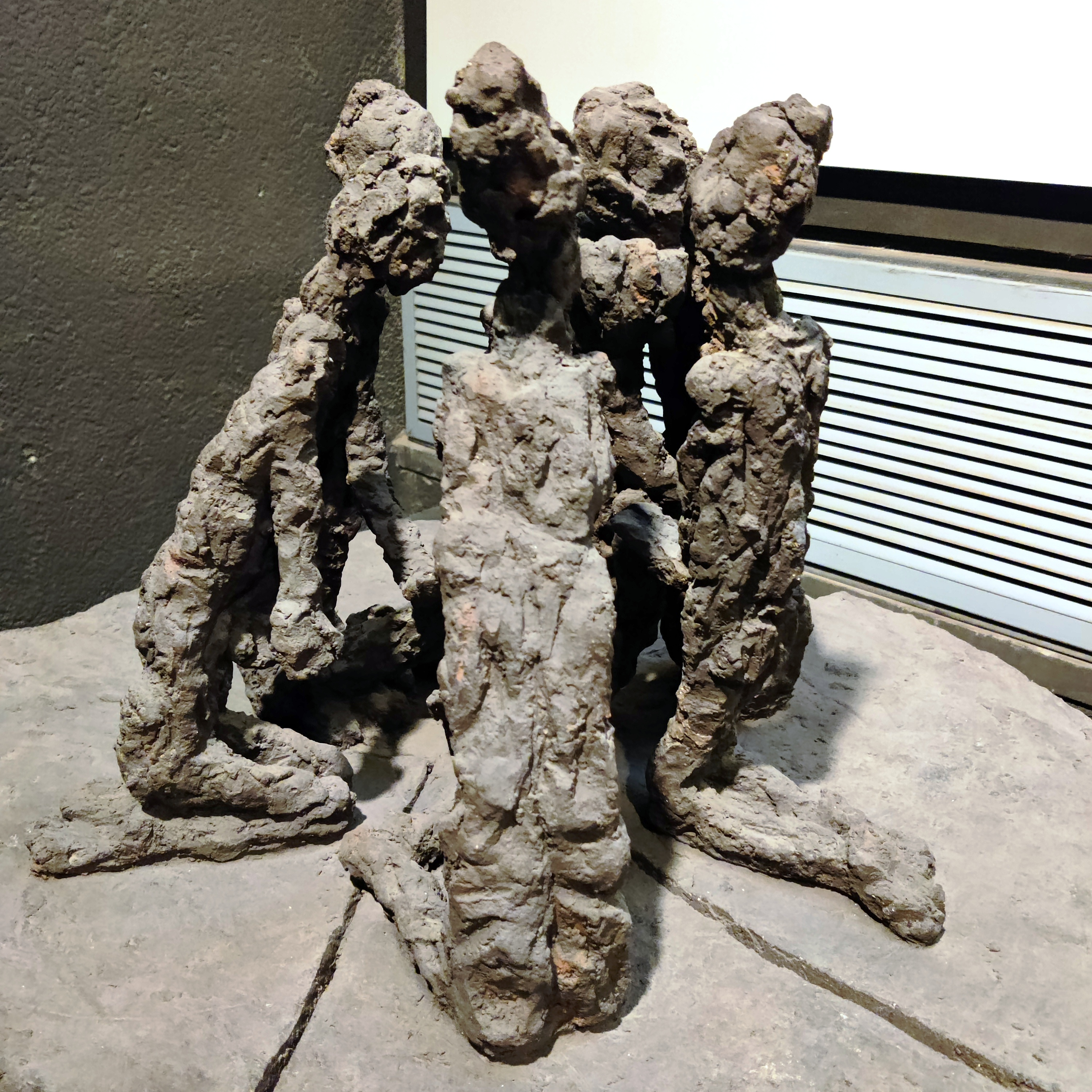
“Women shering a bowl of soup”. Ghetto Fighters' House, Western Galilee

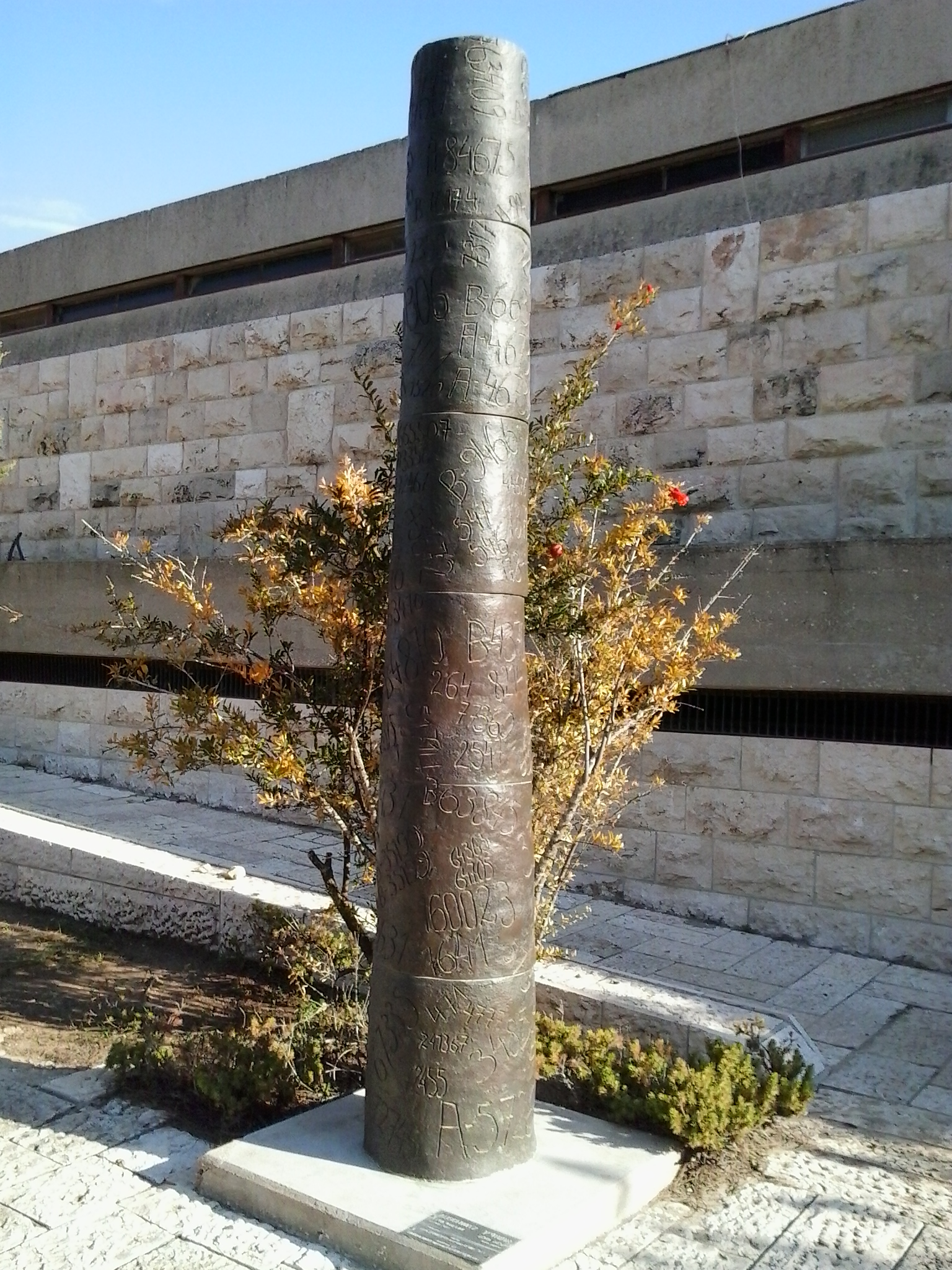
“Auschwitz”. Yad Vashem, Jerusalem

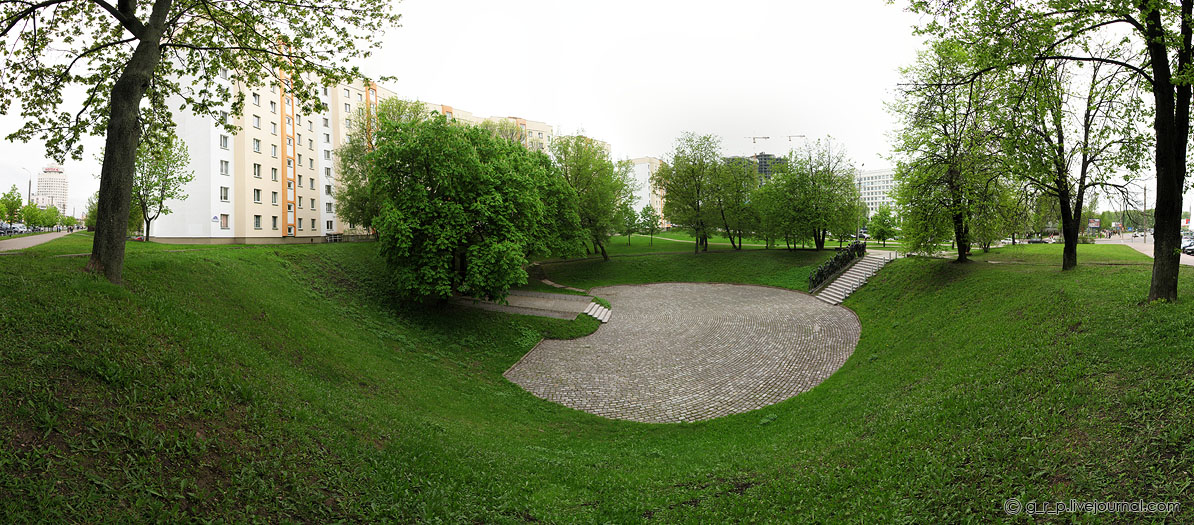
“The Pit”. Minsk, Belarus

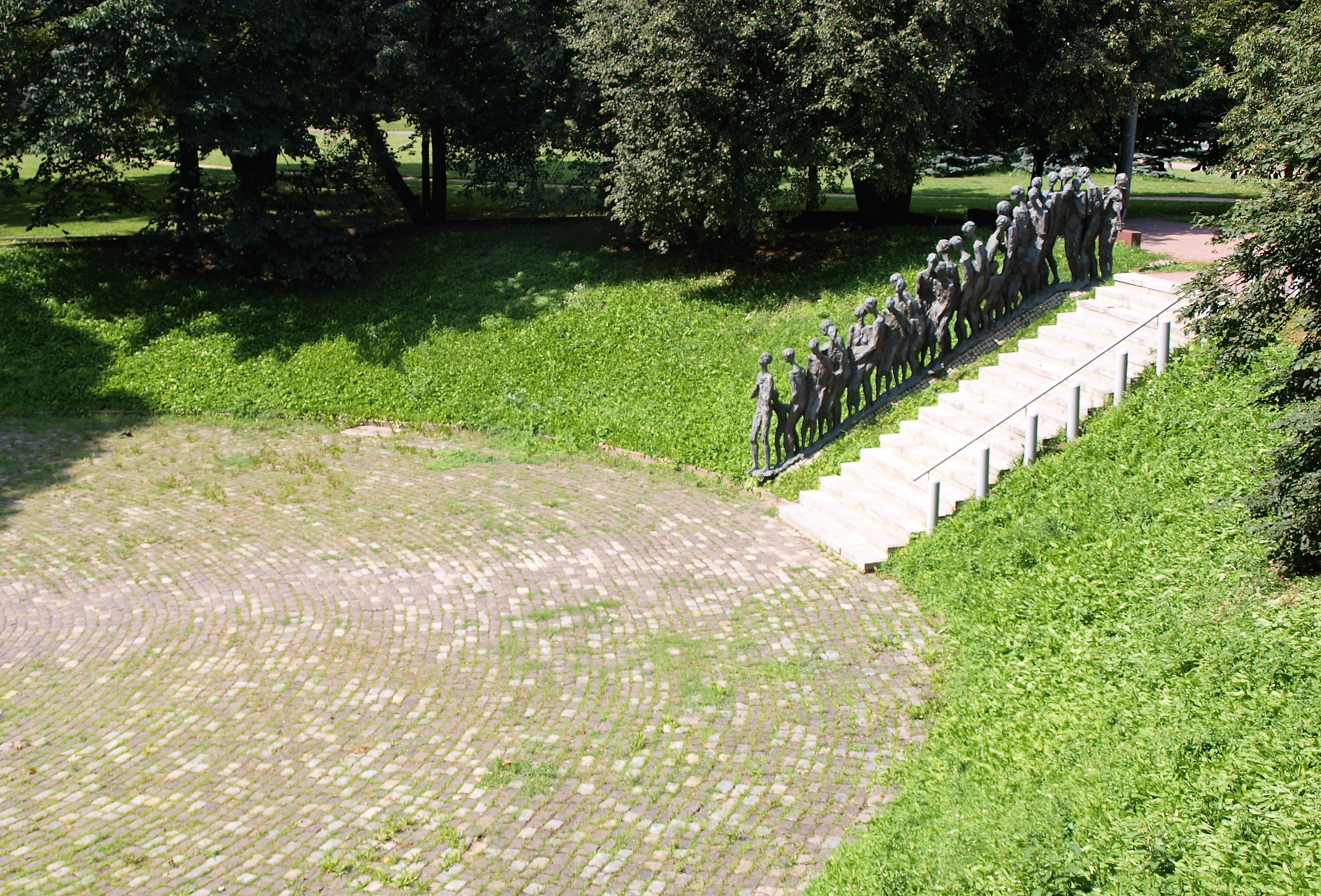
“The Pit”. Minsk, Belarus
