= List of hospitals in Belarus =

The following is a list of hospitals in Belarus. In 1994 there were 127 hospital beds and forty-two doctors per 10,000 inhabitants. The country had 131,000 hospital beds at 868 hospitals.

== Notable hospitals ==
List of Hospitals in Belarus
Name and Wikipedia link	City	Region	established, References
11th City Clinical Hospital (Belarusian Wikipedia)	Minsk	Minsk Region	est. 1889
6th City Clinical Hospital (Belarusian Wikipedia)	Minsk	Minsk Region	est. 1964, 950 beds
2nd City Hospital (Russian wikipedia)	Minsk	Minsk Region	est. 1799
4th City Clinical Hospital named after N. E. Savchenko (Minsk) (Russian Wikipedia)	Minsk	Minsk Region	est. 1957
6th City Clinical Hospital (Minsk) (Belarusian Wikipedia)	Minsk	Minsk Region	est. 1964
Astravets Central District Hospital	Astravyets	Grodno Region	
Baranovichi Children's City Hospital	Baranavichy District	Brest Region	
City Clinical Emergency Hospital (Minsk)		Minsk Region	est. 1978
Dokshytsy District Central Hospital (Belarusian Wikipedia)	Dokshytsy District	Viciebsk Region	
Dubrovno District Central Hospital (Belarusian Wikipedia)	Dubrovna, Dubroŭna District	Vitebsk Region	
Gomel Regional Clinical Hospital for Invalids of the Great Patriotic War (aka Gomel City Clinical Emergency Hospital)	Gomel	Gomel Region	est. 1941
Kozlovichi Mental Asylum	Randilovshchina	Grodno Region	1909–2003
Hospital of the Sisters of Mercy, Asveya (Шпіталь Сясцёр Міласэрнасці (Асвея) in Belarusian Wikipedia)	Asveya	Vitebsk Region	
Lahojsk Central District Hospital	Lahoysk District	Minsk Region	
Liozno District Central Hospital (Belarusian Wikipedia)	Liozna District	Vitebsk Region	
Lida Central District Hospital	Lida	Grodno Region	
Marjina Horka Central Regional Hospital (Belarusian Wikipedia)	Marjina Horka, Puchavičy District	Minsk Region	est. 1910
Military Hospital 4/637	Minsk	Minsk Region	1941–1942 (German hospital)
Mogilev Hospital №1	Mahilioŭ	Mogilev Region	
Miory District Central Hospital	Miory		
Minsk Regional Children's Clinical Hospital	Lesnoy	Minsk Region	
Minsk city hospital	Minsk	Minsk Region	
Novolukoml Central District Hospital	Novolukoml	Vitebsk Region	
Plyeshchanitsy or Logoisk 2nd district hospital	Plyeshchanitsy, Lahoysk District	Minsk Region	
Postavy District Central Hospital	Postavy	Vitebsk Region	
Polotsk Central City Hospital	Polotsk	Vitebsk Region	
Railway Hospital, Minsk	Minsk	Minsk Region	
Shumilin Central District Hospital (Шумілінская цэнтральная раённая бальніца in Belarusian Wikipedia)	Shumilina District	Vitebsk Region	
Smalavichy district hospital	Smaliavičy	Minsk Region	
Tolochin Central District Hospital	Tolochin	Vitebsk Region	
Ushachy Central District Hospital (Ушацкая цэнтральная раённая бальніца in Belarusian)	Ushachy District	Vitebsk Region	
Yanushkovichy district hospital (Янушковичская участковая больница in Russian)	Yanushkavichy	Minsk Region	
Zadoryevsk Nursing Hospital (Задорьевская больница сестринского ухода in Russian)	Zadorye	Minsk Region	

== Gallery ==
Belarusian Hospitals
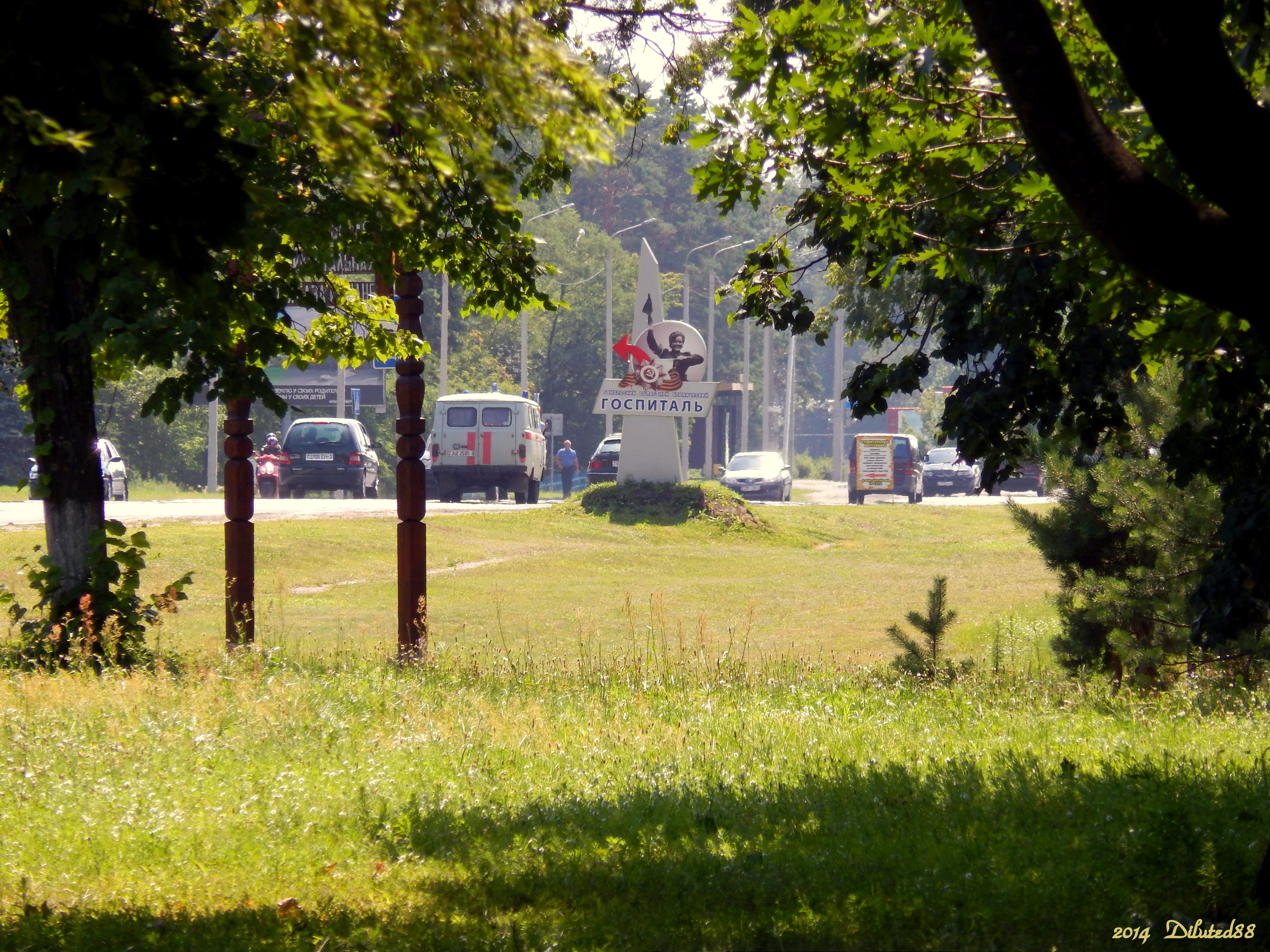
Pointer to Gomel Regional Clinical Hospital for Invalids of the Great Patriotic War

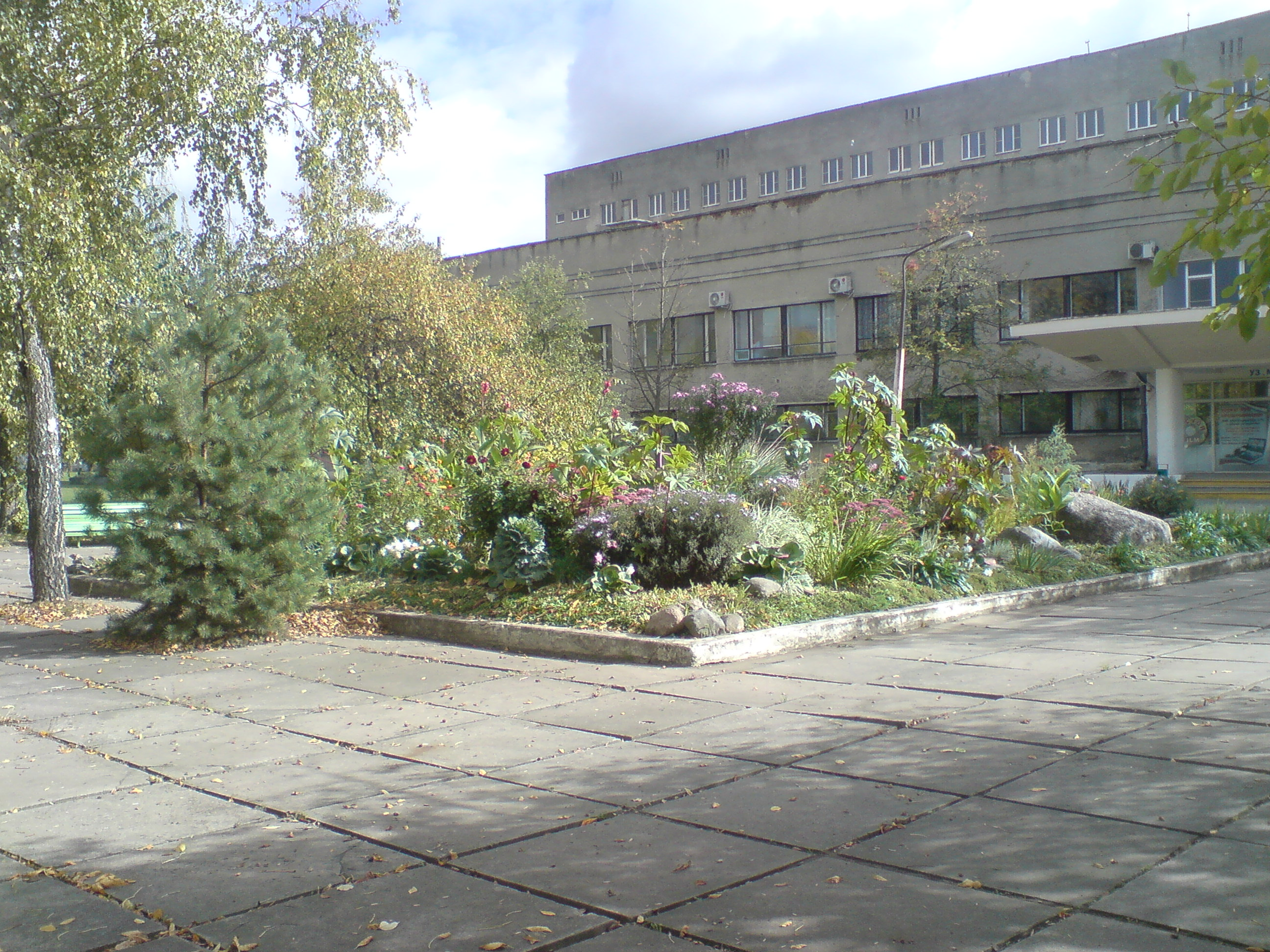
Mogilev Hospital No. 1

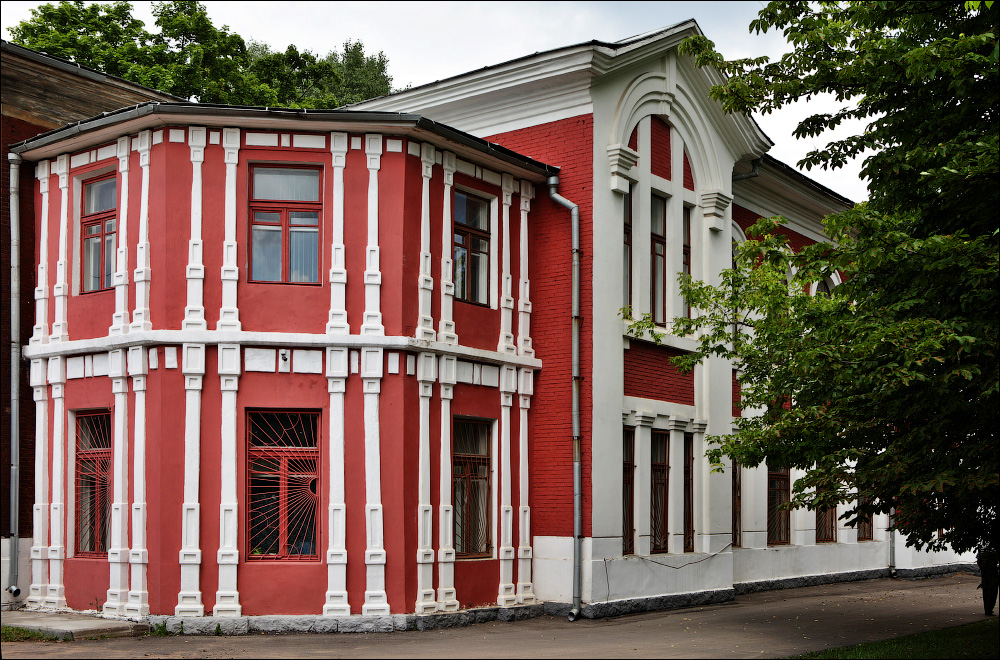
Railway Hospital, Minsk

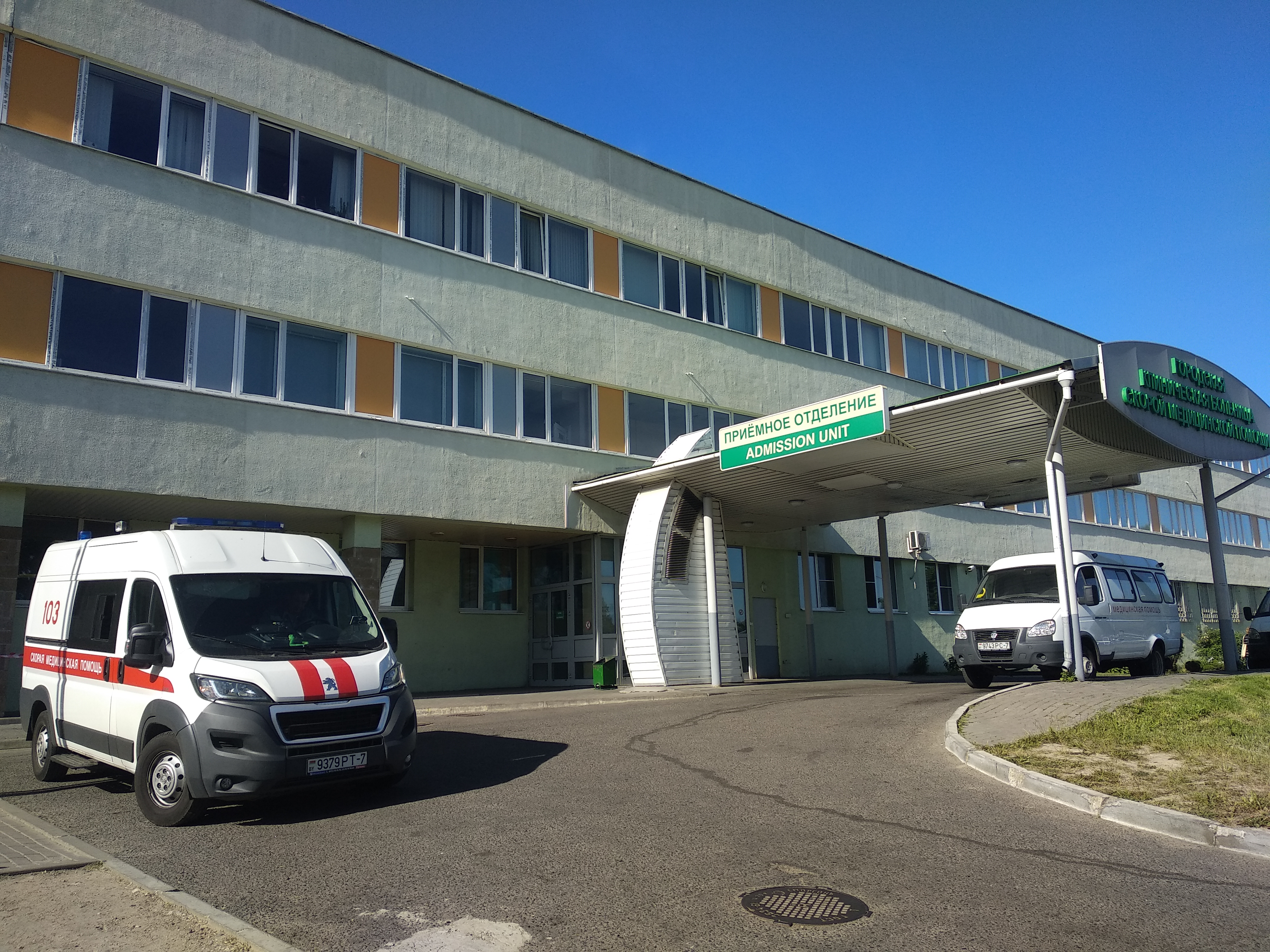
Minsk Clinical Emergency hospital

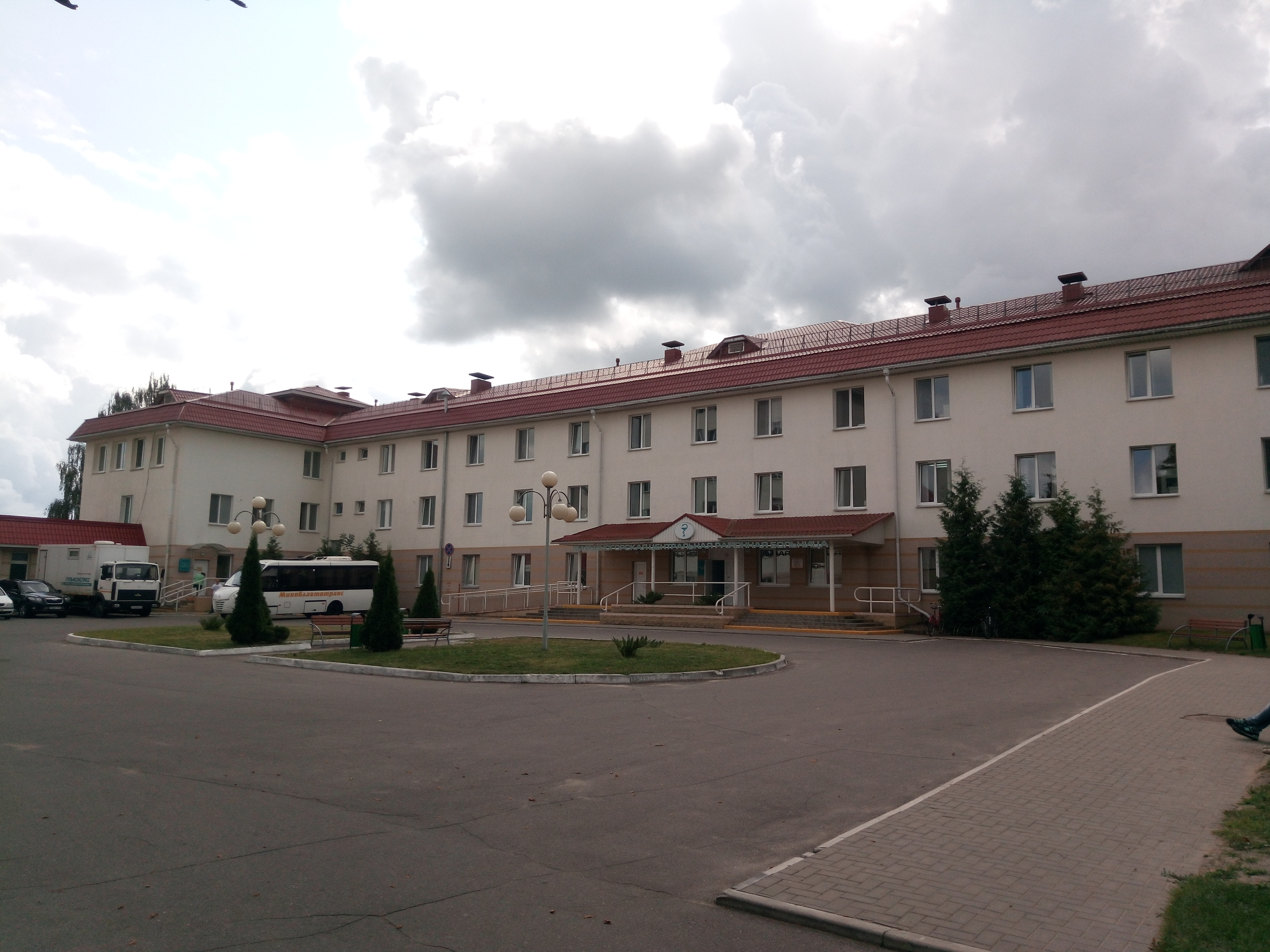
Marjina Horka Central Regional Hospital

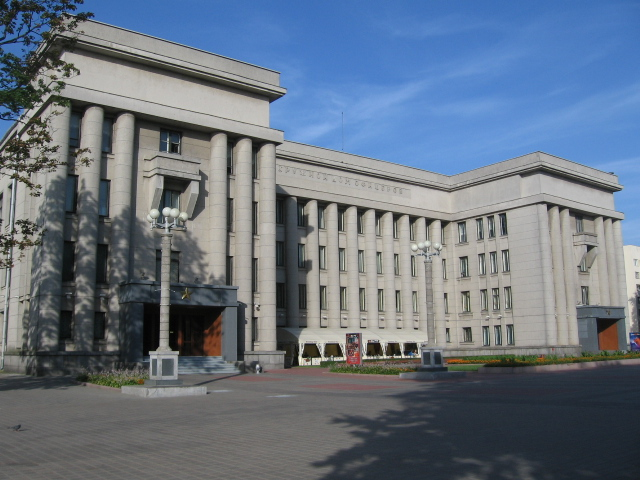
Military Hospital 4/637
