= Rokhl =

Rokhl is a Jewish feminine given name, a form of Rachel, a transcription of Yiddish "Rochl".

Matronymic surnames Rokhlin (variants: Rochlin, Rohlin, Rockline) are derived from it.

Notable people known by the name include:

- Rokhl Auerbakh
- Ester-Rokhl Kaminska
- Rokhl Häring Korn
- Rokhl Brokhes
