= The Holocaust in Belarus =

The Holocaust saw the systematic extermination of Jews living in Byelorussia during its occupation by Nazi Germany in World War II. Before the construction of the Extermination Camps in Poland, the Holocaust was to be carried out in Belarus and the Baltic states using large gassing installations and transport by boats on the waterways rather than by trains. Although the Extermination Camps were eventually established in occupied Poland, roughly 800,000 Belarusian Jews (or about 90% of the Jewish population of Belarus) were murdered according to one estimate. Other estimates place the number of Jews killed between 500,000 and 550,000 (about 80% of the Belarusian Jewish population).

== Background ==
Nazi German rule in Belarus began in the summer of 1941 during Operation Barbarossa (the invasion of the Soviet Union). Minsk was bombed and taken over by the Wehrmacht on 28 June 1941. In Hitler's view, Operation Barbarossa was a war against "Jewish Bolshevism", a Nazi conspiracy theory. On 3 July 1941, during the first "selection" in Minsk, 2,000 Jewish members of the intelligentsia were marched to a forest and massacred. The atrocities committed beyond the German-Soviet frontier were summarized by Einsatzgruppen for both sides of the prewar border between BSSR and Poland. The Nazis made Minsk the administrative centre of Generalbezirk Weißruthenien in the Reichskomissariat Ostland. As of 15 July 1941, all Jews were ordered to wear a yellow badge on their outer garments under penalty of death, and on 20 July 1941, the creation of the Minsk Ghetto was pronounced. Within two years, it became the largest ghetto in the German-occupied Soviet Union, with over 100,000 Jews.

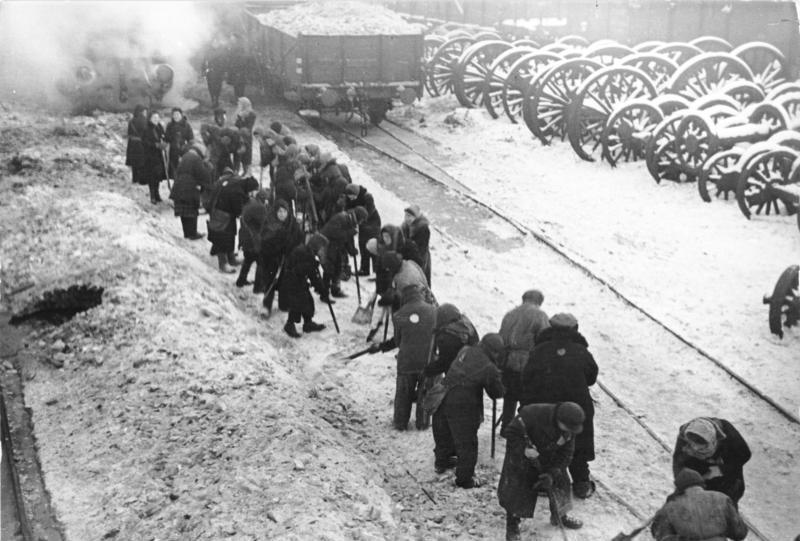
Jewish prisoners of the Minsk Ghetto clearing snow at the station, February 1942

The southern part of modern-day Belarus was annexed into the newly formed Reichskommissariat Ukraine on 17 July 1941 including the easternmost Gomel Region of the Russian SFSR, and several others. They became part of the Schitomir Generalbezirk centred around Zhytomyr. The Germans determined the identities of the Jews either through registration or by issuing decrees. Jews were separated from the general population and confined to makeshift ghettos. Because the Soviet leadership fled from Minsk without ordering evacuation, most Jewish inhabitants were captured. There were 100,000 prisoners held in the Minsk Ghetto, with 25,000 at Bobruisk, 20,000 at Vitebsk, 12,000 at Mogilev, 10,000 each at Gomel and Slutsk, and 8,000 at Borisov and Polotsk. In the Gomel Region alone, twenty ghettos were established in which no less than 21,000 people were imprisoned.

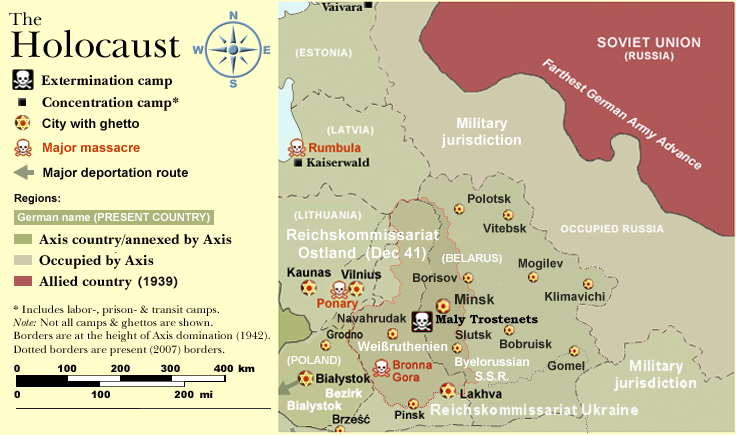
Holocaust in Reichskommissariat Ostland, which included Belarus

In November 1941, the Nazis rounded up 12,000 Jews in the Minsk Ghetto to make room for the 25,000 foreign Jews slated for expulsion from Germany, Austria and the Protectorate of Bohemia and Moravia. On the morning of 7 November 1941, the first group of prisoners was formed into columns and ordered to march and sing revolutionary songs. People were forced to smile at the cameras. Once beyond Minsk, 6,624 Jews were taken by lorries to the nearby village of Tuchinka (Tuchinki) and shot by members of Einsatzgruppe A. The next group of over 5,000 Jews followed them to Tuchinka on 20 November 1941.

== Holocaust by bullets ==
As a result of the Soviet 1939 annexation of Polish territory comprising Soviet Western Belorussia, the Jewish population of BSSR nearly tripled. In June 1941, at the beginning of Operation Barbarossa, there were 670,000 Jews in recently annexed Western Belorussia and 405,000 Jews in the Eastern part of present-day Belarus. The territories of Western Belorussia in 1941 and modern-day Western Belarus are not the same because the Soviet annexation of Polish territory of 1939 included less land than the annexation of 1945. On 8 July 1941, Reinhard Heydrich, head of the Reich Security Main Office (RSHA), gave the order for all male Jews in the occupied territory – between the ages of 15 and 45 – to be shot on sight as Soviet partisans. By August, the victims targeted in the shootings included women, children, and the elderly. The German Order Police battalions as well as the Einsatzgruppen carried out the first wave of murders.

In the Holocaust by bullets, no less than 800,000 Jews perished in the territory of modern-day Belarus according to one estimate. Most of them were shot by Einsatzgruppen, Sicherheitsdienst (SD), and Order Police battalions aided by Schutzmannschaften. Notably, when the bulk of the Jewish communities were annihilated in the first major killing spree, the number of Belarusian collaborators was still considerably small, and the Schutzmannschaft in Belarus consisted most of Lithuanian, Ukrainian, and Latvian volunteers. Historian Martin Gilbert wrote that the General-Commissar for Generalbezirk Weißruthenien, Wilhelm Kube, personally participated in the 2 March 1942 killings in the Minsk Ghetto. During the search of the ghetto area by the Nazi police, a group of children were seized and thrown into a deep pit of sand covered with snow. "At that moment, several SS officers, among them Wilhelm Kube, arrived, whereupon Kube, immaculate in his uniform, threw handfuls of sweets to the shrieking children. All the children perished in the sand."

=== Saving Jews ===
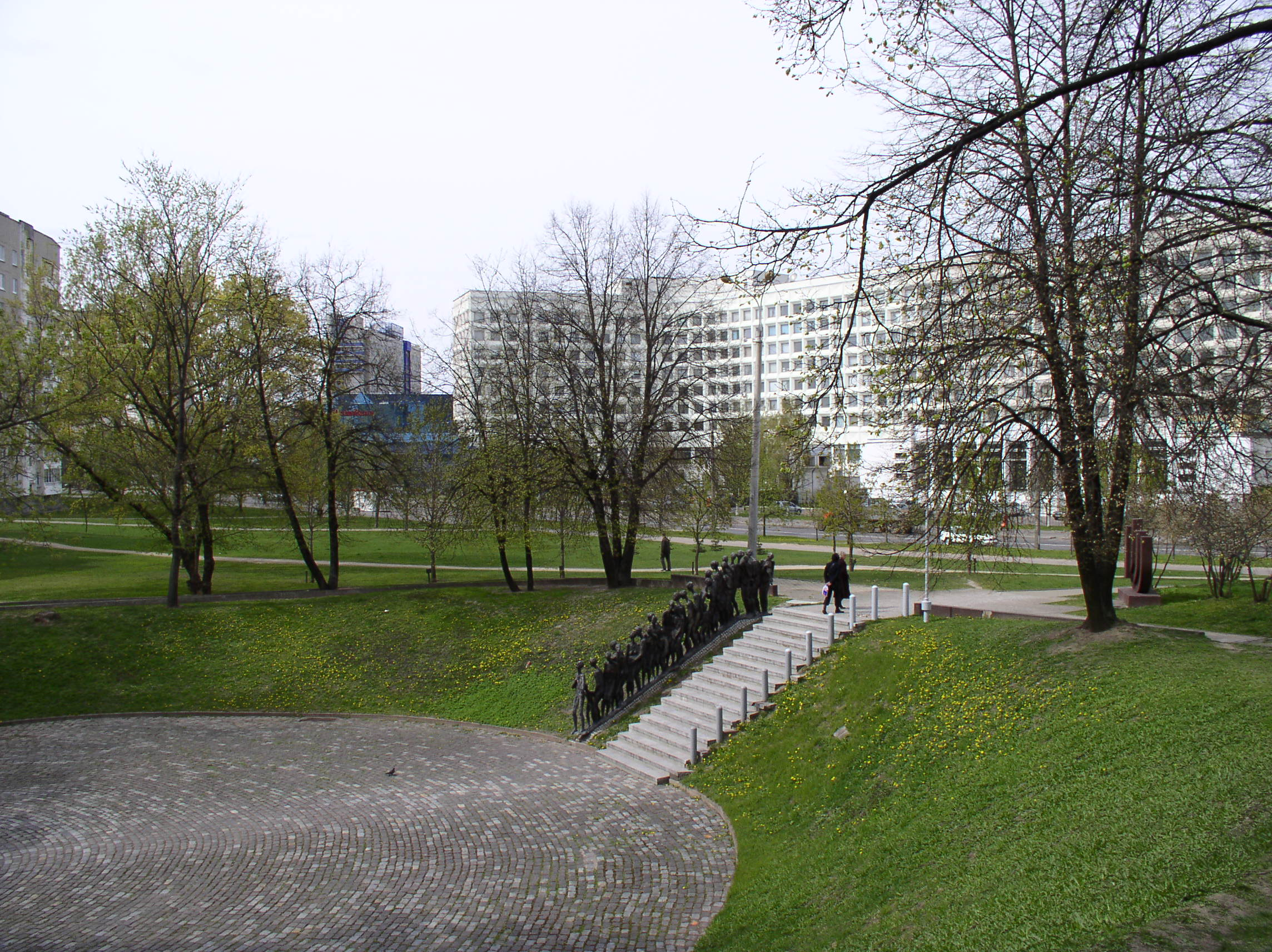
The Pit is a monument on the corner of Melnikayte and Zaslavskaya streets dedicated to the victims of the Holocaust in Minsk

As of 1 January 2017, the Yad Vashem in Israel recognized 641 Belarusians as Righteous Among the Nations. All of the awards were granted after the dissolution of the Soviet Union. Many of the distinguished individuals came from Minsk and are already deceased.

== Postwar research ==
In the 1970s and 1980s, historian and Soviet refusenik Daniel Romanovsky, who later immigrated to Israel, interviewed over 100 witnesses, including Jews, Russians, and Belarusians from the vicinity, recording their accounts of the "Holocaust by bullets". Research on the topic was challenging in the Soviet Union because of government restrictions. Nevertheless, based on his interviews, Romanovsky concluded that the open-type ghettos in Belarusian towns were the result of the prior concentration of the entire Jewish communities in prescribed areas. No walls were required. According to Leonid Rein, the collaboration with the Germans by some non-Jews was in part a result of attitudes developed under Soviet rule; namely, the practice of conforming to a totalitarian state, sometimes pejoratively called Homo Sovieticus.

== See also ==
- Bielski partisans
- Defiance (2008 film)
- The Holocaust in Lithuania
- The Holocaust in Poland
- Judenfrei
- Operation Ostra Brama
- Reichskommissariat Moskau
- Reichskommissariat Ostland
- Ukrainian-German collaboration during World War II
- Vitsyebsk gate
- Timeline of Jewish history in Belarus
- Come and See
