= Hanna Krasnapiorka =

Belarusian journalist and writer

Hanna Krasnapiorka (Ганна Давыдаўна Краснапёрка), 1925 – 2 May 2000) was a journalist, writer and a survivor of the Minsk Ghetto. Her husband was writer and journalist Uladzimir Miechaŭ.

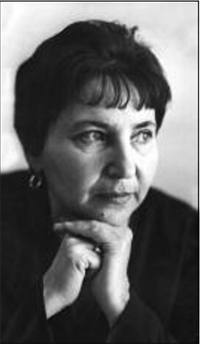
Hanna Krasnapiorka, Belarusian writer and journalist

== Recognition ==
In 1998, in Germany, a prize named after Hanna Krasnapiorka was founded (прэмія імя Ганны Краснапёркі premija imia Hanny Krasnapiorki / Anna Krasnopërko-Preis) for recognizing activities in the field of reconciliation between Belarus and Germany.

This prize has been awarded to, among others, Adam Maldzis, historian Hienadź Barkun, poet Alieś Kasko and Head of the Belarusian Great Patriotic War Museum Aljaksandr Uljanovič.

== Writings ==
- 1976 Сузор'е: Апавяданнi Suzorje: Apaviadanni [A Constellation: Short Stories]. Minsk: Mastackaja literatura, 96pp.
- 1984 Пiсьмы маёй памяцi. Непрыдуманая аповесць Piśmy majoj pamiaci. Nieprydumanaja apoviesć [Letters from My Memory: A Not Invented Story]. Minsk: Mastackaja literatura, 111pp.
  - Russian translation (journal edition, introduced by the famous Belarusian writer Vasil Bykaŭ): Анна Давыдовна Красноперко Anna Davydovna Krasnopiorko. 1989. Письма моей памяти: непридуманная повесть Pisʹma moei pamiati: nepridumannaia povestʹ [translated from the Belarusian by Galina Kureneva] (pp71–121). Дружба народов. No 8, Aug.
  - Russian translation: Анна Давыдовна Красноперко Anna Davydovna Krasnopiorko. 1989. Письма моей памяти: непридуманная повесть Pisʹma moei pamiati: nepridumannaia povestʹ [translated from the Belarusian by Galina Kureneva]. Moscow: Khudozhnaia literatura, 118pp.
  - English translation: Anna Krasnoperko. 1993 [Unpublished manuscript]. Letters from My Memory: The Real Story [translated from the Belarusian by Eleonora Golbert]. Washington DC: USC Shoah Foundation Institute (available at Internet Archive).
  - German translation: Anna Krasnopërko. 1984. Briefe meiner Erinnerung. Mein Überleben im jüdischen Ghetto von Minsk 1941/42 [translated from the Russian translation by Uwe Gartenschläger]. Dortmund: Haus Villigst, 84pp.
  - French translation: Hanna Krasnapiorka. 2020. Lettres de ma mémoire. Récit de non-fiction (Ser: 100 000 signes) [translated from the Belarusian by Alena Lapatniova]. Les Essarts-le-Roi : le Ver à soie-Virginie Symaniec éditrice, 143pp. ISBN 9791092364392.

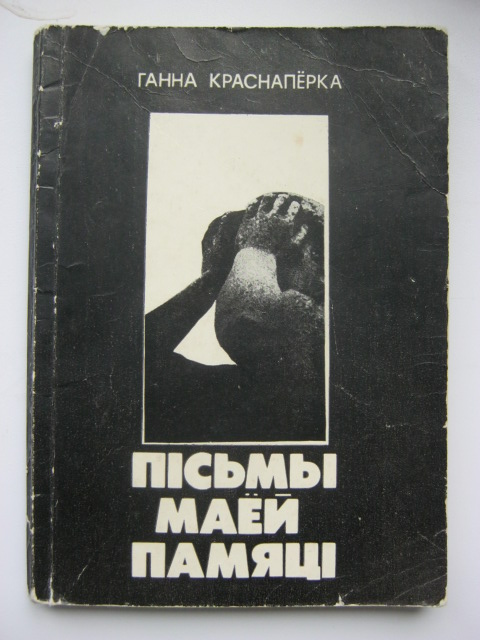
Hanna Krasnapiorka. 1984. Piśmy majoj pamiaci [Letters from My Memory]

== Literature ==
- Мехов, Владимир. 2001. СКОРБЬ. Мишпоха. No 9.
- Toŭscik, Iryna A /Тоусцік, Ірына. 2003. Anna Krasnapjorka. Ein Leben im Dienste der Aussöhnung / Ганна Краснаперка: жицце у імя прымірэння [Hanna Krasnapiorka: A Life in the Service of Reconciliation; translated from the Belarusian into German by Margarita Höckner]. Berlin: Forschungsstelle Diktatur und Demokratie, Freie Universität Berlin / Берлінскі Свабодны універсітэт, 68pp. ISBN 9783929532616.
