= Heinz Rosenberg =

German tradesman and survivor of the Holocaust

Heinz Ludwig Rosenberg (15 September 1921 – 13 August 1997), later known as Henry Robertson, was a German-born American author and Holocaust survivor. He survived 11 concentration camps and was one of only approximately fifty German and Austrian Jewish survivors of the "Sonderghetto" in the Minsk Ghetto. He later recounted his wartime experiences in the book The Years of Horror: An Authentic Report.

Rosenberg was born in September 1921 into a Jewish family in Göttingen, where his father owned a linen factory. In 1941 he was deported to Minsk. He was in the Minsk ghetto until 1943, although for some time he was one of the Jews who found themselves under the protection of Military Hospital 4/637, until the hospital was relocated to Crimea. He was then sent to a number of concentration camps, including Treblinka, Plaszow, Wielicza, Flossenbürg, Sachsenhausen and Bergen-Belsen. In 1949 he immigrated to the United States and adopted the name Henry Robertson. His 1985 book The Years of Horror was published under his original name, however. Rosenberg died in New York in August 1997 at the age of 75.

== Works ==
- Heinz Rosenberg: The Years of Horror: An Authentic Report, New York, s.n., 1985
- Heinz Rosenberg: Jahre des Schreckens. "…und ich blieb übrig, daß ich Dir’s ansage", Steidl, Göttingen, 1985, ISBN 3-88243-238-1
