= Masha Bruskina =

Soviet Belarusian partisan (1924–1941)

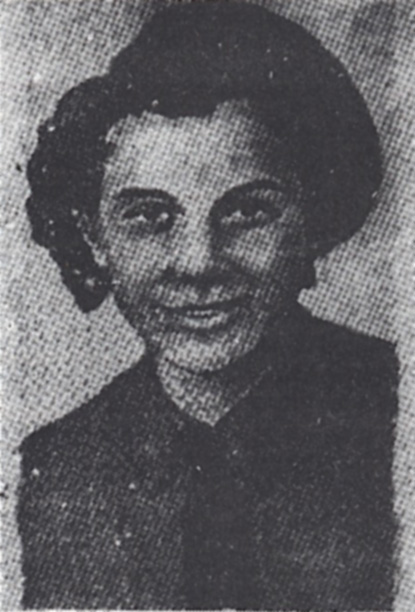
Portrait of Bruskina

Maria "Masha" Bruskina (Belarusian: Марыя Барысаўна Брускіна Marïya Barïsawna Bruskina; Russian: Мария Борисовна Брускина; 1924 – 26 October 1941), was a Belarusian Jewish nurse and a communist martyr to the anti-fascist resistance during the early years of World War II, as well as a niece of the sculptor and Soviet MP Zair Asgur. While volunteering as a nurse, she cared for wounded Red Army soldiers, and assisted them in escaping then Nazi-occupied Byelorussian Soviet Socialist Republic. For this, she and 11 other communists of the anti-fascist underground were imprisoned, tortured, and when the teenager refused to reveal any secrets, was publicly executed by the German Wehrmacht.

She was 17 years old at the time of her execution, and is believed to be among the first Soviet partisans publicly executed by Nazi Germany.

== Early life ==
Masha Bruskina lived in Minsk with her mother, Lucia Moiseyevna Bugakova, senior product manager of the Book Trade Office of the BSSR State Publishing House. She was an avid reader and learner. She was a member of the Marxist–Leninist Vladimir Lenin All-Union Pioneer Organization and a member of the school committee of Komsomol, both of which were youth groups of the Communist Party of the Soviet Union. In December 1938, the newspaper Pioneer of Belarus published a photograph of Masha with the caption: "Masha Bruskina - the schoolgirl of 8th grade in school № 28, Minsk. She has only good and excellent marks in all subjects". In June 1941, Maria Bruskina graduated from Minsk secondary school № 28. With her friend Elena Drapkina, they tried to get hired at the Judenrat, but did not have success.

== Public execution by the Wehrmacht ==
"Exceptional as her heroism may seem, Maria Bruskina was one of many young Soviet people who resolved to stand up to the German occupants no matter what the cost. They saw themselves as defenders of humanity against the depravity of the Germans. The occupiers made a point of singling out the female resisters, portraying them as callous Bolsheviks, bereft of femininity. Maria responded to these provocations by walking proudly to her death, her head held high. The photographs that were meant to taunt and vilify inadvertently became documentary proof of her dignity and equanimity in the face of death."— Historian Jochen Hellbeck.

She volunteered as a nurse at the hospital in the Minsk Polytechnic Institute, which had been set up to care for members of the Red Army wounded while defending what was then the Byelorussian Soviet Socialist Republic against the planned genocide of the indigenous Slavic peoples by 3.8 million Nazi troops, a military escalation that remains the largest land invasion in history.

In addition to caring for the soldiers, Bruskina helped them escape by smuggling civilian clothing and false identity papers into the hospital. A patient told the Germans what Bruskina was doing, and she was arrested on October 14, 1941, by members of the Nazi Army's 707th Infantry Division and 2nd Schutzmannschaft Battalion and Lithuanian auxiliary troops under the command of Major Antanas Impulevičius. A Red Army soldier, Boris Mikhailovich Rudzyanko, denounced Masha Bruskina and eleven other partisans. Rudzyanko was known for treachery and his role in the mass killing of Jews in the following years was evidence. After being arrested, Bruskina wrote a letter to her mother on October 20, 1941:

I am tormented by the thought that I have caused you great worry. Don't worry. Nothing bad has happened to me. I swear to you that you will have no further unpleasantness because of me. If you can, please send me my dress, my green blouse, and white socks. I want to be dressed decently when I leave here.

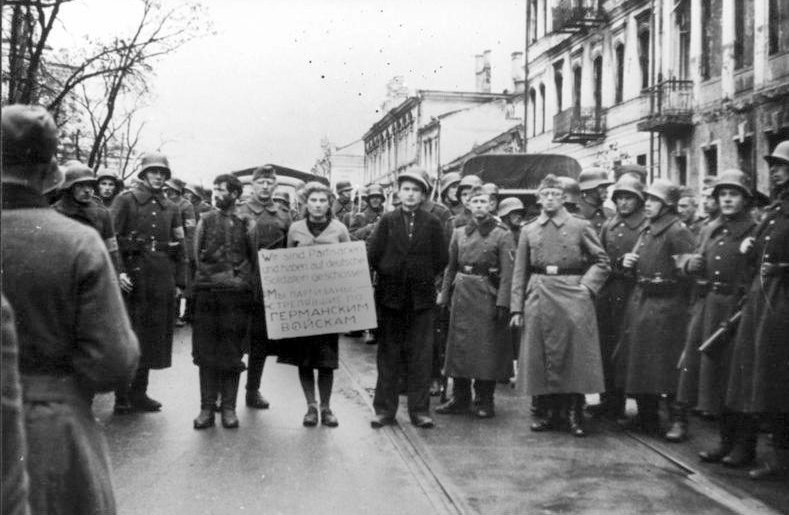
Bruskina with fellow resistance members before hanging. The placard reads "We are partisans who shot at German troops"

The German Nazi invaders decided on a public hanging to make an example of Bruskina, along with two other members of the resistance, 16-year-old Volodya Shcherbatsevich and World War I veteran Kirill Ivanovich Trus. Before being hanged, she was paraded through the streets with a placard around her neck which read, in both German and Russian: "We are partisans and have shot at German troops", the latter which had never actually occurred. Members of the resistance were routinely made to wear similar signs whether or not they had actually shot at German troops as a display of power and authority by the Nazi invaders, theoretically demonstrating their total control of the occupied nation and its peoples.

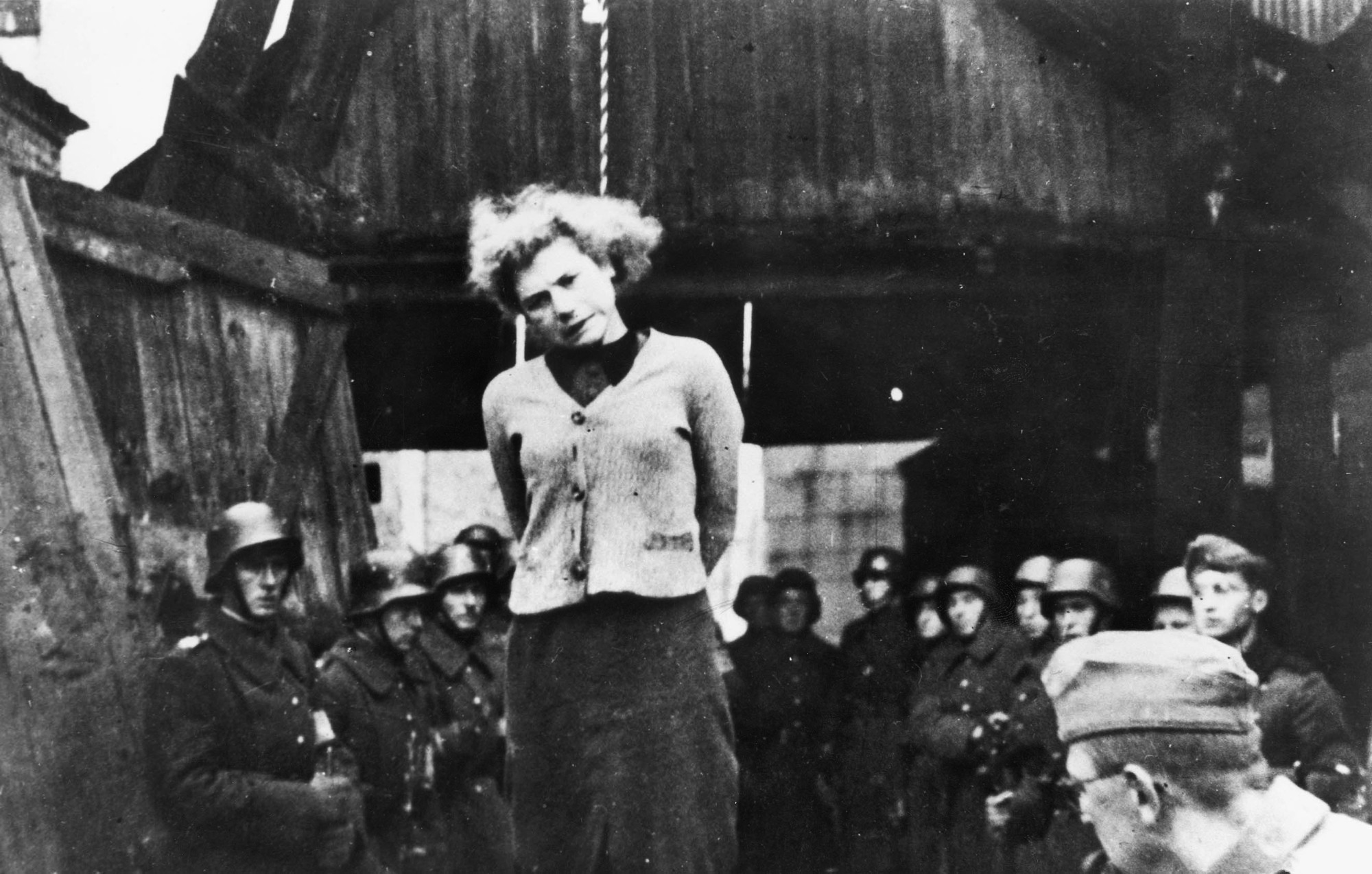
Bruskina hanged by German soldiers

Bruskina and her two comrades were hanged in public on Sunday, October 26, 1941, in front of Minsk Kristall, a yeast brewery and distillery plant on Nizhne-Lyahovskaya Street (15 Oktyabrskaya Street today).

A witness of the execution said:

When they put her on the stool, the girl turned her face toward the fence. The executioners wanted her to stand with her face to the crowd, but she turned away and that was that. No matter how much they pushed her and tried to turn her, she remained standing with her back to the crowd. Only then did they kick away the stool from under her.

— Pyotr Pavlovich Borisenko

Olga Shcherbatsevich, the mother of executed 16-year-old activist Volodia Shcherbatsevich, was hanged the same day along with 10 other members of the Soviet anti-fascist resistance in front of what is now the National Academy of Sciences of Belarus.

The German Nazi authorities would not allow the victims to be cut down and buried for three days, during which time the bodies were displayed publicly as a warning to other anti-fascists, Jews and Communists. On October 28, a German car stopped and a soldier ordered two Jews to cut the ropes and load the bodies into the back of a truck.

== Identification and remembrance ==
For decades after the war, Bruskina was officially referred to only as "the unknown girl", possibly due to antisemitism from Soviet authorities. Up until 2009, Bruskina's name was not acknowledged on the memorial plaque at the execution site. In 2009, however, a new memorial plaque at the execution site was installed, due in part to advocacy from Bruskina's comrade Elena Drapkina. The Russian inscription now reads "Here on October 26, 1941 the Fascists executed the Soviet patriots K. I. Truss, V. I. Sherbateyvich and M. B. Bruskina". Bruskina was first recognized in the 1960s, as most of her family and friends had been killed in the Minsk Ghetto.

A monument for Bruskina was erected in HaKfar HaYarok in Israel, and a street was named after her in Jerusalem.

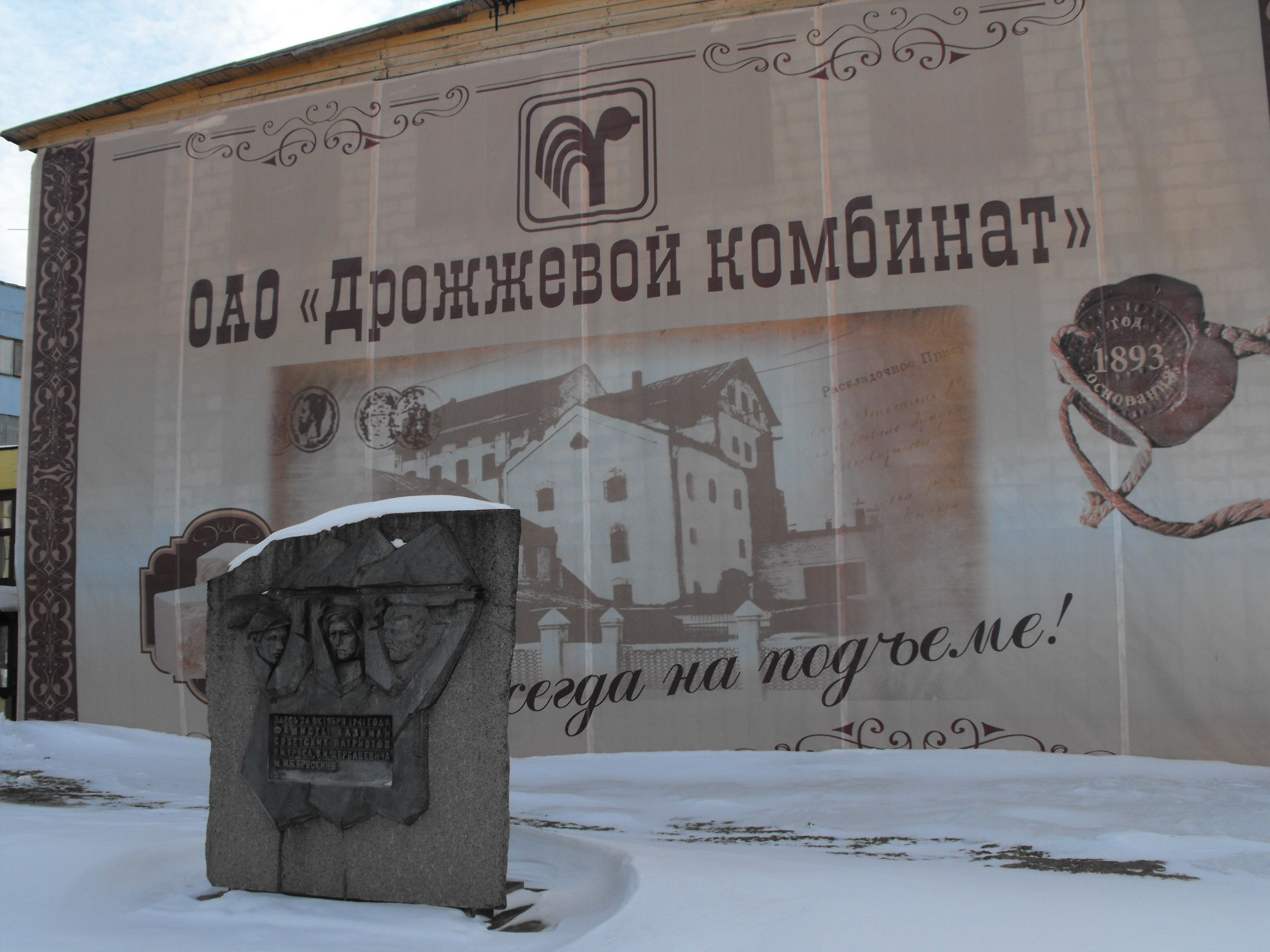
Commemorative at the entrance of Minsk yeast plant, at the place of execution K.I. Trus, V. I. Scherbachevich and M. B. Bruskina.

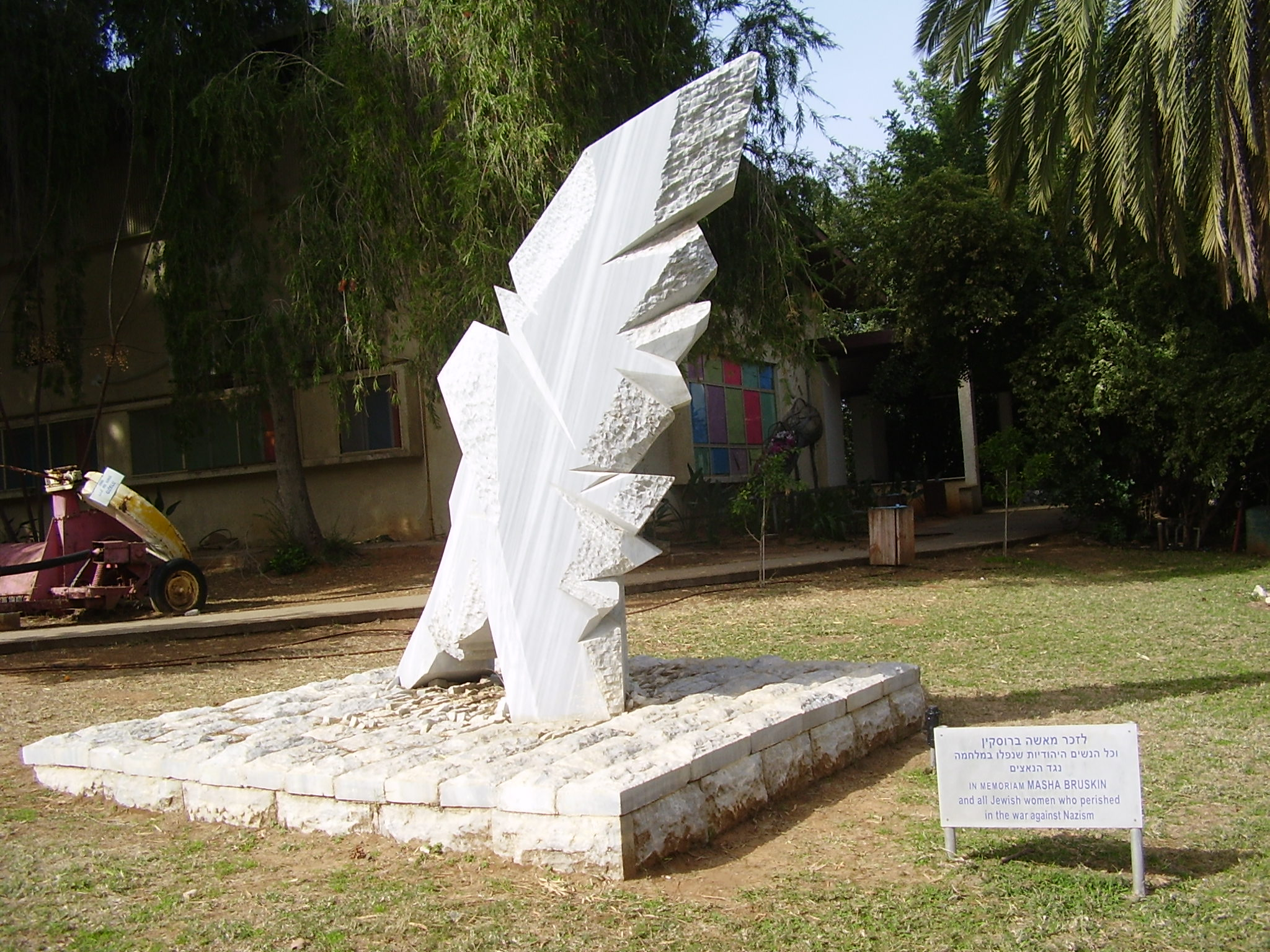
Monument in memory of M. Bruskina and other Jewish women, who fought against the Nazis. Kfar Ha-Yarok, Israel.

== See also ==
- List of female Heroes of the Soviet Union

== Sources ==
- Hellbeck, Jochen. 2025. World Enemy Number 1, Nazi Germany, Soviet Russia, and the Fate of the Jews. Penguin Press ISBN 978-0593657386
- Steinberg, Stephen and Weiss, Clara. 2026. “Jochen Hellbeck’s ‘World Enemy Number 1, Nazi Germany, Soviet Russia, and the Fate of the Jews’” World Socialist Web Site, February 9, 2026. https://www.wsws.org/en/articles/2026/02/10/hebe-f10.html Accessed 20 February, 2026.
