= Military Hospital 4/637 =

- German Army Medical Service
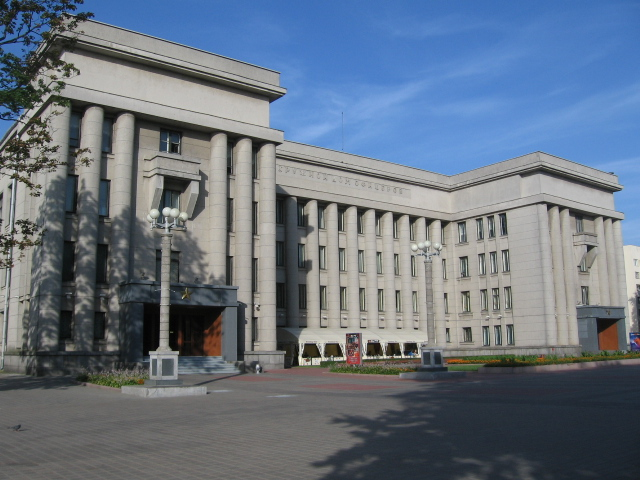
- The former hospital building, now known as the Officer's House

Geography
- Location: Minsk, Belarus
- Coordinates: 53.903135°N 27.564291°E

Organisation
- Type: Military hospital

Services
- Beds: 1,000

History
- Opened: 1941
- Closed: 1942

Links
- Lists: Hospitals in Belarus

Military Hospital 4/637 (German: Kriegslazarett 4/637) was a large German military general hospital in Minsk operated by the Army Medical Service from 1941 to 1942 during World War II. The hospital was located in the former House of the Red Army building (now called the Officer's House or Army Palace), a monumental Stalinist building inaugurated in 1936 and designed by Iosif Langbard. The hospital reached a capacity of around 1,000 beds. The hospital mainly treated German soldiers, but also civilians and enemy soldiers to some extent.

== History ==
The hospital employed a number of Jews from the nearby Minsk ghetto as auxiliary workers in a variety of capacities, thereby shielding them from the SS, and on at least one occasion the hospital's physicians risked their lives by allowing Jews to hide from the SS in the hospital. The Holocaust survivor Heinz Rosenberg recounts in his memoirs how he and other Jews were treated with a humanity and kindness which "seemed like a miracle" by the hospital's staff and leadership. This protection of Jews in the Minsk area came to an end when the hospital was ordered to relocate to Crimea.
