= Elena Drapkina =

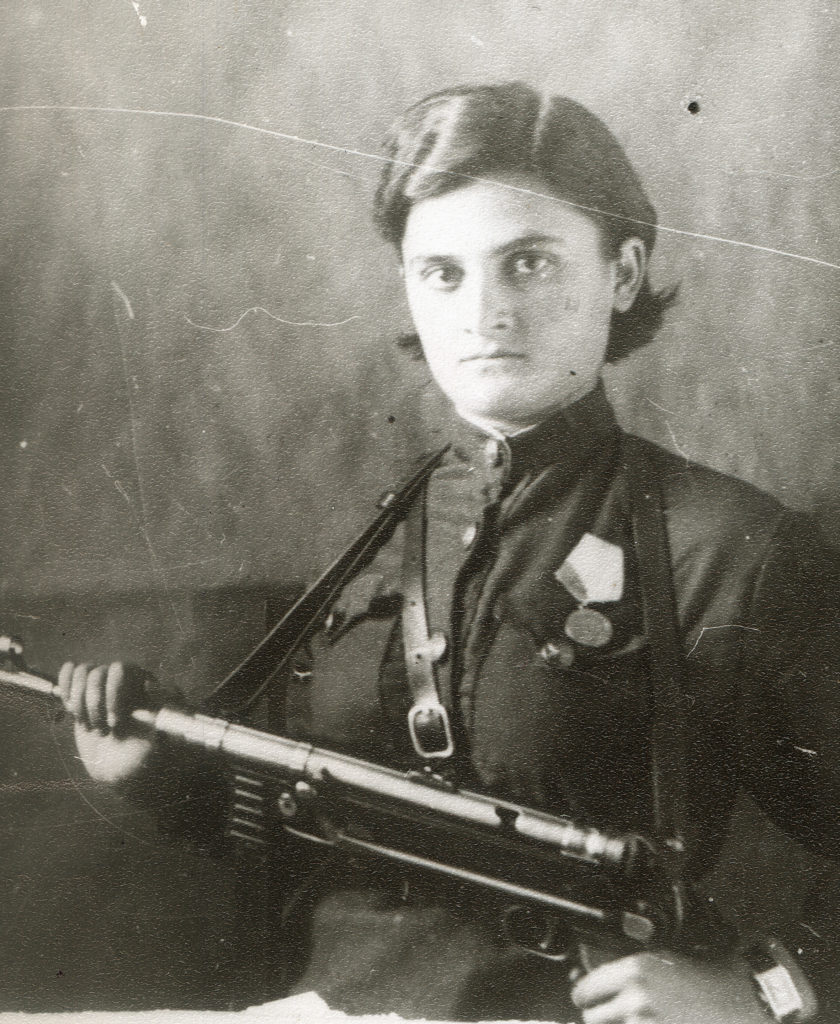
- Born: Elena Askrevna Levina; November 5, 1924; Minsk, Belarus
- Died: December 22, 2016 (aged 92)
- Spouse: Vul'f Drapkina
- Parent(s): Osher Levin and Ginde Levina
- Relatives: Hirsh and Saul Levin (siblings)

Elena Drapkina (born Elena Askrevna Levina, 1924 – 2016) was a Belarusian Jew who is best known for her participation in the anti-Nazi Partisan movement after escaping the Minsk Ghetto during the later years of the Holocaust. After liberation from World War II, Drapkina worked for the Minsk executive council and also completed dentistry school. Although raised as a secular Jew and Russian nationalist, she became more observant later in life to honor her late relatives and family members who had died in the Holocaust. In the mid-1990s and early 2000s, she further participated in several oral history projects documenting the experience of Jewish partisans.

== Early life ==
=== Family and Judaism ===
Elena Drapkina was born in Minsk, the capital of the Byelorussian Soviet Socialist Republic and a major city in Pale of Settlement home to ~71,000 Jews, in 1924. Her older brother, Hirsh, was born in 1920, and her younger brother, Saul, was born in 1929. Her parents, Osher Levin and Ginde Levina, were teachers but gave up their jobs to work for the Minsk executive committee (Ispolkom). The family was relatively comfortable socioeconomically and, like many Jews at the time, well integrated into secular Soviet society. They lived in a three-room apartment in a two story building, a decent-sized apartment for the time. Drapkina’s grandparents followed Jewish traditions, such as keeping holidays, eating kosher, and going to synagogue, but her parents did not. Accordingly, Drapkina was brought up as an atheist and also did not learn Yiddish.

=== Soviet nationalism ===
During Drapkina’s youth, new Soviet policies of nationality were put into effect, which allowed Jews to participate in social, political, and economic duties. Until World War II, Jews in the Soviet Union were only identified as Jews because their passports were stamped with natsional’nost’ (Russian for nationality), which noted that the person was ethnically Jewish. As a result of this process of secularization in the 1920s and 1930s, many Jews in Belarus began to assimilate and to become more Soviet than Jewish. They also had inter-national friendships and work connections, especially big cities like Minsk. Under Soviet rule, alternatives to Jewish culture were offered, such as options to leave the Pale for higher education and activities for children.

=== School, pioneer camps, and pre-military training ===
During the interwar period, Drapkina participated in state-sponsored programing that emphasized state loyalty and secular belonging. She attended to integrated Belorussian schools, which were considered “uppercrust,” and took part in kruzhki (Russian for workshops), sports clubs and Pioneer camps. In these camps, teachers instilled communist and socialist values in the children. Drapkina was predominantly raised in such after-school and summer camps, which were offered through both her parents' jobs and her own school.

In addition to school activities, Drapkina joined the Minsk BGTO (Bud’ Gotov’k Trudu i Obrorone SSSR, meaning “be ready for labor and defense of the USSR”), a military training program that enlisted civilians for defense in states of emergency. This program provided group exercise and lessons in weapons and shooting, which sparked Drapkina's interest in competitive swimming. While training for the test to get into the BGTO program, a coach convinced her to train regularly, which led to her competing in swim competitions on the Republic level. Drapkina set multiple records in butterfly and breaststroke. When older, she may have participated in OSOAVIAkhIM (In English: Society for Promotion of Defense, Aviation, and Chemical Development).

== German takeover ==
Germans troops approached Soviet territory unbeknownst to many citizens. In Minsk, the city administrators and party functionaries had not ordered an evacuation or ensured any safety measures in preparation. Policies implemented by Nazi regime, such as the gulag, began to affect Jewish lives greatly. Anti-semitic attacks ensued on schools, factories, and farms as well as anti-religious protests, propaganda, party purges, and other violence. Around the time that the Germans began taking over, Drapkina was invited to a guest performance of the Moscow Art Theater in the Pioneers Palace, but could ultimately not attend.

German airstrikes began on 23 June 1941, when Drapkina was 17. The night of the invasion, German troops attacked the former Pale of Settlement. Drapkina watched them march with her paramilitary organization. Generalkommissariat Weißrutheniens (the German Civilian Administration) became headquartered in Minsk, under General Commissioner was Wilhelm Kube. The new administration demanded that 50,000 Jews, including Drapkina and their family, leave their homes and resettle in a set location of 200 hectares (less than 500 acres). In August 1941, Germans also started to execute Jewish civilians, even children. Yet most citizens were still unaware of the plans for a Final Solution.

== Inside the Minsk Ghetto ==
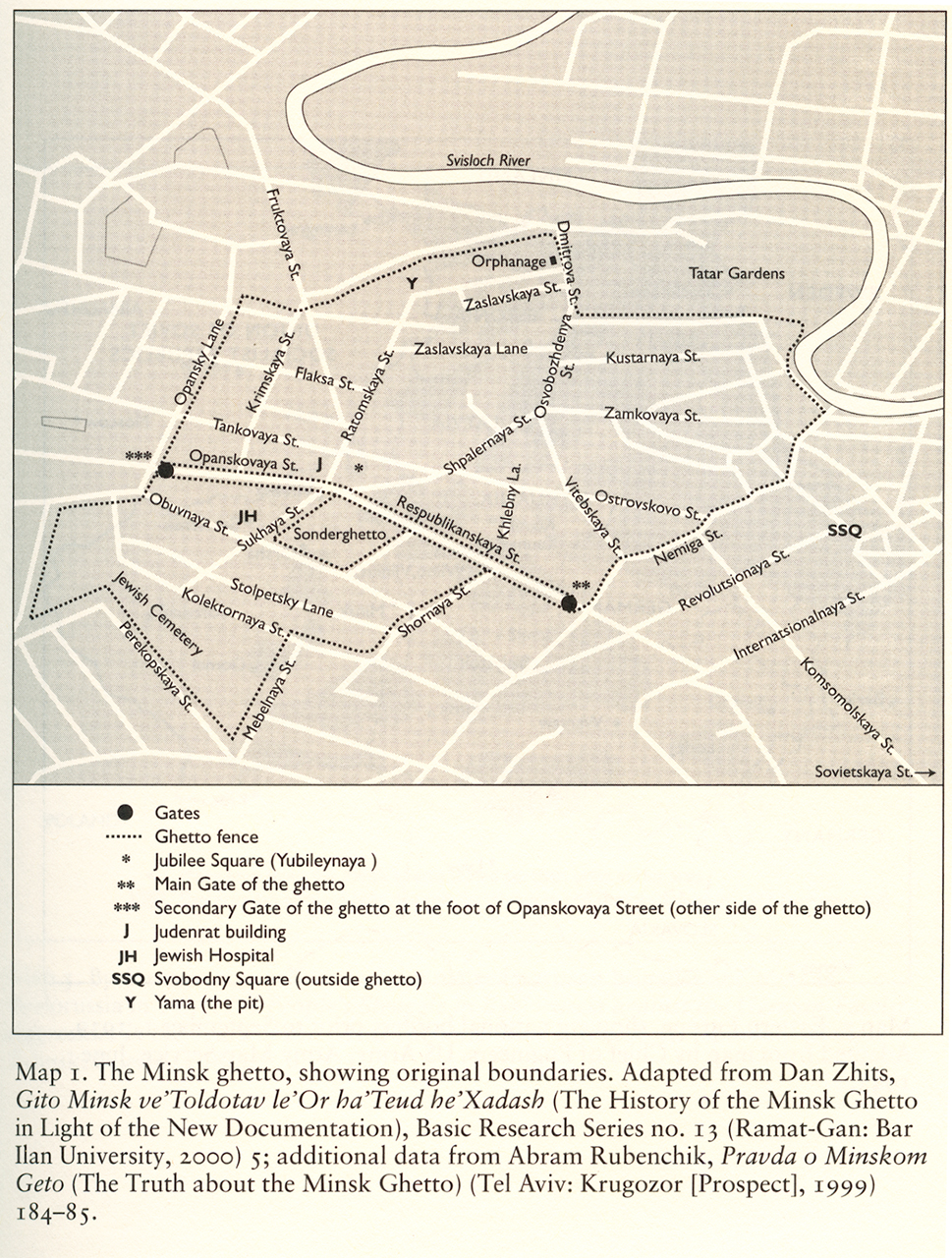
Plan for the Minsk Ghetto

=== Life inside the Ghetto ===
The Minsk Ghetto was proposed on 19 July 1941 and became a place of persecution where inmates were oftentimes denied food and travel. Any Jew older than 10 years old had to wear a yellow patch on their chest and back. Each adult had 1.5 square meters of space, and none was specified for children.

Inside the ghetto, Drapkina lived in a house with nine people: her uncle, aunt, cousin, and her widowed uncle with only a daughter, and they shared a room that was 14 square meters. They slept on top of and underneath the table.

Adolescents like Drapkina suffered the most in the ghetto because they were the most starved, experienced violence, and endured the most emotional/psychological trauma. They did have access to employment; however, this also made them vulnerable to sexual violence. In later interviews, Drapkina described a warning system that her neighbor had set up as a form of self-defense: The neighbor had a bell that she rang for the entire neighborhood whenever she heard a scream. Although Drapkina herself never confirmed whether she had experienced sexual assault occurring at work inside the ghetto, many of her peers in the ghetto did.

Drapkina used her work assignments in the ghetto to discretely plan her eventual escape. She signed up to work in the labor office of the Judenrat, the Jewish government of the ghetto, alongside her friend Masha Bruskina. Both were unsuccessful, and Drapkina was assigned to the freight yard, instead. She worked with 16 other women on cleaning trains and removing snow from the tracks, and in return she received daily food rations. These work places allowed for opportunities to connect with underground movements.

=== Significant Ghetto events ===
On 20 November 1941, Drapkina survived a pogrom because she was able to hide in a hiding space prepared in advance by the inmates of the ghetto. Together with others, she hid underneath stairs covered with tin plates and laundry. The hiders did not move for an entire day and night. When finally leaving the spot, Drapkina saw one of her uncles being murdered in the living room. Drapkina’s mother and younger brother were found, taken away, and later murdered as a result of this pogrom.

Because the Judenrat refused to send 500 residents to be killed on 2 March 1942, German troops planned on raiding the ghetto. Drapkina received this information in advance from overhearing a conversation between German workers. During the raid, all of the children in the orphanage, patients at the hospital, and other innocent civilians were murdered by German and Lithuanian police. Drapkina's work column was assigned to mount a truck at the end of the day as a punishment. Their column was then escorted to the gate at the intersection of Chornaia and Obutkovo streets. When she was lined up to re-enter the ghetto, a German guard took her identity card, stating that she was a regular worker as opposed to a skilled worker, and tried to beat her. Eventually, she was let go and passed through the checkpoint. Besides her, only one other woman among her friends from the work column survived this selection at the gate.

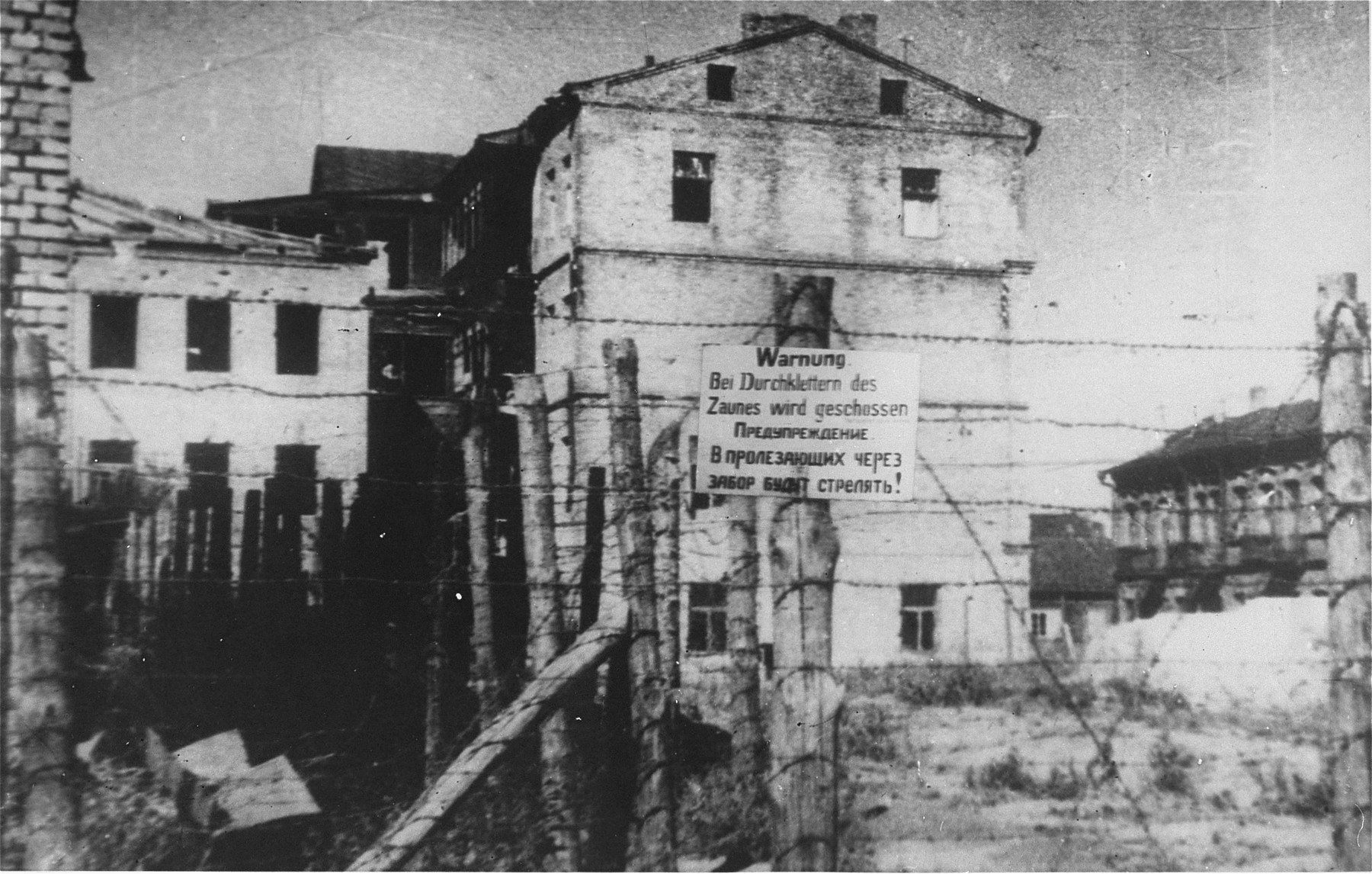
Buildings with warning signs in the Minsk Ghetto

=== Escape from the Ghetto ===
A few days after the 1941 pogrom, Drapkina was offered a passport by two Russian workers. The passport stated that she was Polish, which would make it possible for her to leave the ghetto. Drapkina waited until another pogrom occurred at the end of July 1942 to execute her escape, with the hope that in her absence the Germans would simply assume that she was dead. She left immediately after. Like Drapkina, 6,000 out of 10,000 people ended up fleeing from the Minsk Ghetto, but most of them left around spring and fall of 1943. After exiting the ghetto, Drapkina met a non-Jewish woman who allowed her to live in her farmer's house west of Minsk and work for her as a housemaid.

== Joining the partisans ==
While working on the farm, Drapkina met a group of Soviet parachutists who were sent to that area to set up a partisan unit behind German front lines. They convinced her to join. The partisans' mission was to make Germans' lives miserable by sabotaging and destroying their infrastructure, help the local civilians restore and produce faith, as well as promote winning the war. Drapkina was 18 at the time and ended up serving for two years.

Drapkina's partisan group, referred to as an otriad, consisted of eight people at the time and was led by I. M. Timchuk. By February 1943, it had grown to 40 members. Every member had a specific job, and Drapkina was initially assigned to work in the kitchen. After declining this assignment, she was sent to work in the medical tent as a nurse. After telling the commander that she had hemophobia, she was finally sent into combat. Drapkina's ortriad included many women who joined because they felt threatened by German retaliation. Women were oftentimes kicked out of the partisan units for being pregnant, causing Drapkina to avoid romantic relationships.

In early 1944, Drapkina was appointed the commander of Morozova, a village that her brigade oversaw. She organized the evacuation of its inhabitants because an unknown troop was passing through the area. At the end of June 1944, her partisan group united with Soviet troops in anticipation of being liberated from the Nazi regime. Soviet troops liberated German occupied areas in June and July 1944.

== Post-war life ==
After her partisan group united with Soviet troops, Drapkina was demobilized. Like many other women fighters, she was not given any veteran benefits or public recognition for her service as a partisan.

Drapkina subsequently found work as a secretary at the headquarters of the Belorussian partisan movement in Minsk, provided her with a place in a dormitory and military-level food ration cards. Afterwards, she worked in the city’s executive council in a relatively high-ranking leadership position.

In mid-1945, as Victory Day was being celebrated, Drapkina moved to Leningrad to study dentistry. In Leningrad, she lived with her aunt, her only living relative given that the rest of her family had perished during the Holocaust. Her aunt convinced her to go to university, and she enrolled in courses at the university. Although she had not taken an academic exam since 9th grade and had not seen a newspaper since 1941, Drapkina successfully completed her coursework and subsequently worked as a dentist in Leningrad. In the early 1950s, she lived in fear of wide-spread anti-Semitic campaigns against Jewish doctors.

In 1945, she married Vul’f Drapkin, a military officer. He died in 1949 by succumbing to injuries from war. They had one son, whom Drapkina raised alone until she remarried.

== Later life and legacy ==
Later on in life, Drapkina expressed the desire to learn Yiddish and more about her Jewish heritage. She took Jewish culture classes and started going to synagogue. To commemorate her dead relatives, she began lighting a yahrzeit candle on their death anniversaries, a tradition that can be traced back to Jewish fast days, times of repentance, and commemorations of tragedies.

Drapkina also participated in multiple interviews in the late 1990s and early 2000s to provide testimony about her experiences during the war. As part of these oral history projects, some of which resulted in multimedia educational materials, she spoke at length about her life before, during, and following the Holocaust.

In 2008, Drapkina and others helped advocate for her friend Masha Bruskina's memorial to be identified under her name, as it was erected in the 1960's under "young woman/name unknown". This allowed for the Soviet and post-Soviet states to recognize Jewish female partisans.

Drapkina died in St. Petersburg, Russia, on 22 December 2016.
