= The Pit (memorial) =

Holocaust memorial in Minsk, Belarus

Coordinates: 53°54′35.36″N 27°32′33.81″E

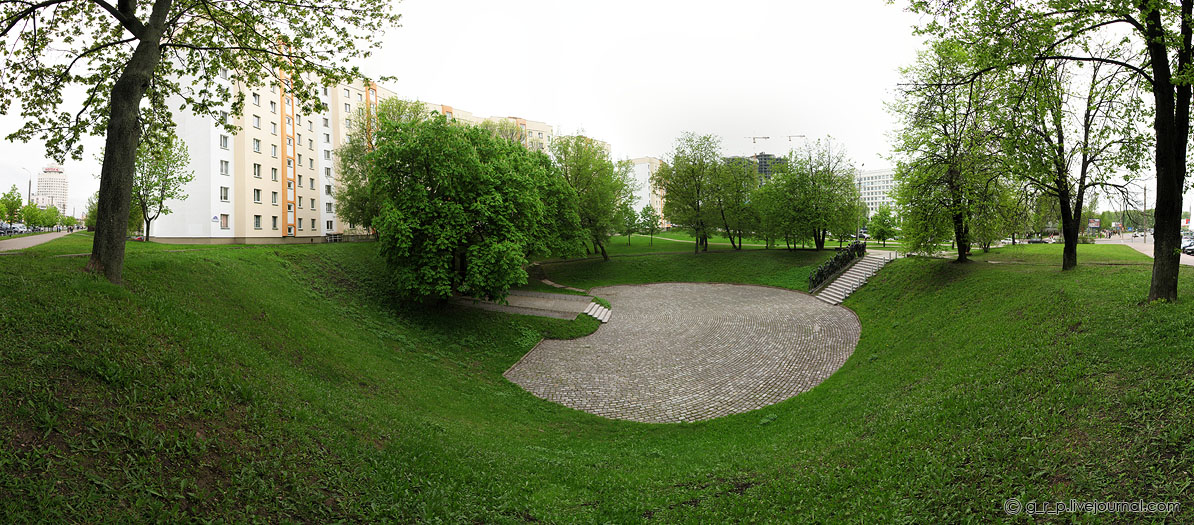
The memorial with obelisk on the left (obscured) and group sculpture on the staircase on the right

The Pit (Belarusian: Яма, romanized: Yama) is a monument dedicated to the victims of the Holocaust on the corner of Melnikayte and Zaslavskaya streets in Minsk, Belarus. The memorial is located at the site where, on 2 March 1942, Nazi German forces shot about 5,000 Jewish residents of the nearby Minsk Ghetto.

== History ==
The obelisk was created in 1947 by the Soviet Union, and in 2000 a bronze sculpture titled "The Last Way" was added. It represents a group of victims descending the steps of the pit. The sculpture was created by the Belarusian artist and Chairman of the Jewish communities of Belarus, Leonid Levin, and the sculptor Elsa Pollak from Israel. On the obelisk is written in Russian and Yiddish (though the two translations are not exact), "To the shining memory of the bright days of five thousand Jews who perished at the hands of sworn enemies of humanity, German-fascist butchers, on 2 March 1942."

When the reconstruction of the memorial was undertaken, no machinery was used, and all the work was done by hand, a process which took eight years to complete. According to the original plan, the memorial was intended to be more detailed, but was ultimately left with an expressive aestheticism, devoid of national colours. It includes figures of a violinist, children, and a pregnant woman, allowing for representation of collective character. The memorial has been a target of vandalism. Funeral assemblies are held at the memorial every year on 2 March.

== See also ==
- The Holocaust in Belarus
- List of Holocaust memorials and museums
