= Minsk Ghetto =

Nazi ghetto in occupied Belarus

Coordinates: 53.9098°N 27.5429°E

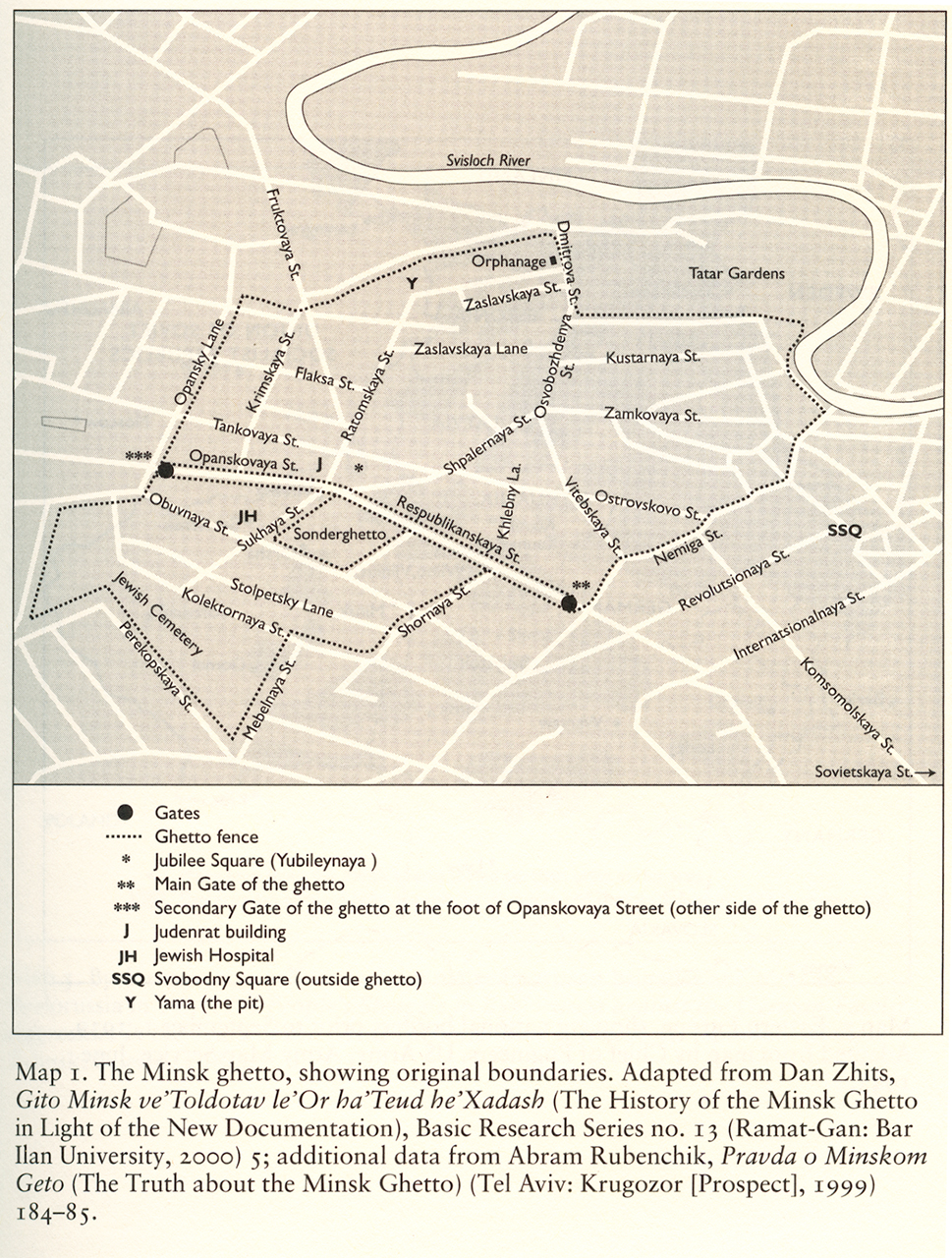
- Map of the Minsk Ghetto by professor Barbara Epstein
- Also known as: German: Ghetto Minsk
- Location: Minsk, German-occupied Belarus
- Date: 20 July 1941 to 21 October 1943
- Incident type: Imprisonment, mass shootings, forced labor, starvation, mass deportations to Sobibor
- Perpetrators: Nazi Germany
- Organizations: Schutzstaffel (SS), Einsatzgruppen
- Camp: Maly Trostenets, Sobibor
- Victims: 70,000–100,000
- Documentation: Museum of Jewish History and Culture in Belarus
- Memorials: The Pit

The Minsk Ghetto (German: Ghetto Minsk; Belarusian: Мінскае гета, romanised: Minskaje hieta or Менскае гета, romanised: Mienskaje hieta; Russian: Минское гетто, romanized: Minskoye getto) was created soon after the German invasion of the Soviet Union. It was one of the largest in the Byelorussian SSR, and the largest in the German-occupied territory of the Soviet Union. It housed close to 100,000 Jews, most of whom were murdered in The Holocaust.

== Background ==
As of 1 January 1939, the Jewish population of Minsk was 70,998, comprising 29.7% of the city's total population of 238,948. Particularly in contrast to neighbouring Poland, which had been marked by increased state antisemitism in the years prior to the invasion of Poland and where many Minsk Jews either had relatives or originated, Minsk was noted for the relative absence of antisemitism. In spite of the Great Purge's curtailing of Yiddish institutions, mass arrests of the Jewish intelligentsia and a general decline in the well-being of Jews, the Jews of Minsk continued to possess loyalty both to the Soviet Union and towards the Jewish people, and public expressions of anti-fascism and solidarity with Jews who were subjected to the policies of Nazi Germany remained common. Academic Elissa Bemporad, citing Minsk's Jewish population, notes that, "The condition of Soviet Jewish culture and life deteriorated in the late 1930s, but many Soviet Jews in the depth of their heart felt reassured by the fact that they lived in a country that officially struggled against anti-Semitism, in the midst of fascist Europe".

Following the beginning of Operation Barbarossa, members of the Jewish population of Minsk began fleeing eastwards, and historian Yitzhak Arad estimates that 7,000 fled Minsk before the fall of the city to Nazi Germany in late June 1941.

== History ==
Initial registration of Jews started on 28 June 1941, soon after the German invasion of the Soviet Union and capture of the city of Minsk, capital of the Byelorussian SSR. On the fifth day after the occupation, 2,000 Jewish intelligentsia were massacred by the Germans; from then on, murders of Jews became a common occurrence. About 20,000 Jews were murdered within the first few months of the German occupation, mostly by the Einsatzgruppen squads.

On 17 July 1941, the German occupational authority, the Reichskommissariat Ostland, was created. On 20 July, the Minsk Ghetto was established. A Jewish Council (Judenrat) was established as well. The total population of the ghetto was about 80,000 (over 100,000 according to some sources), of whom about 50,000 were pre-war inhabitants, and the remainder (30,000 or more) were refugees and Jews forcibly resettled by the Germans from nearby settlements.

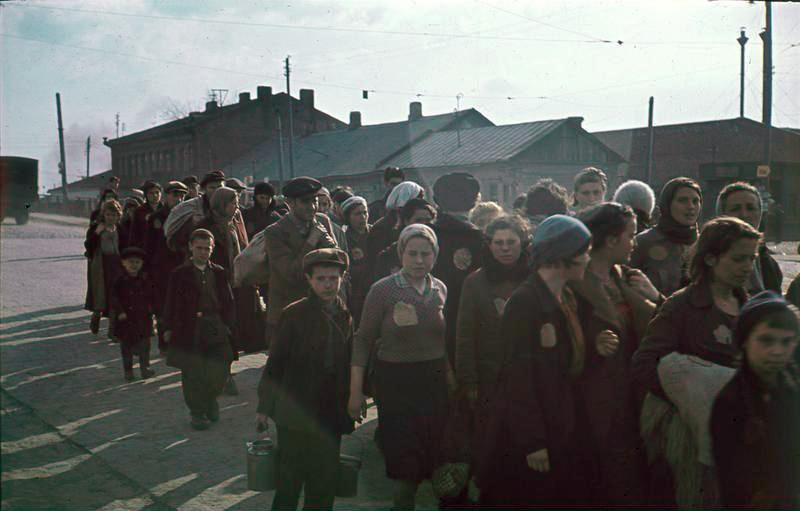
Jews in the Minsk Ghetto, 1941

Between 5,000 and 6,000 Jews were murdered from August to October 1941.

Mass murder occurred on 7 November 1941, with an estimated 12,000 to 17,000 Jews executed. This was followed by another on 20 November, which killed between 5,000 and 10,000. These executions aimed to free space for German Jews being transferred to the camp. In total, by the end of November, roughly 25,000 Jews had been murdered, with 45,000 remaining in the ghetto.

In November 1941 a second ghetto was established in Minsk for Jews deported from the West, known as Ghetto Hamburg, which adjoined the main Minsk ghetto. Above the entrance to this separate ghetto was a sign: Sonderghetto (Special Ghetto). Every night the Gestapo would murder 70–80 of the new arrivals. This ghetto was divided into five sections, according to the places from which the inhabitants came: Hamburg, Berlin, the Rhineland, Bremen, and Vienna. Most of the Jews in this ghetto were from Germany and the Protectorate of Bohemia and Moravia; the largest number it held at once was about 35,000 residents. Little contact was permitted between the inhabitants of the two ghettos. In total, 23,904 Jews were transported from Germany to Minsk between November 1941 and October 1942.

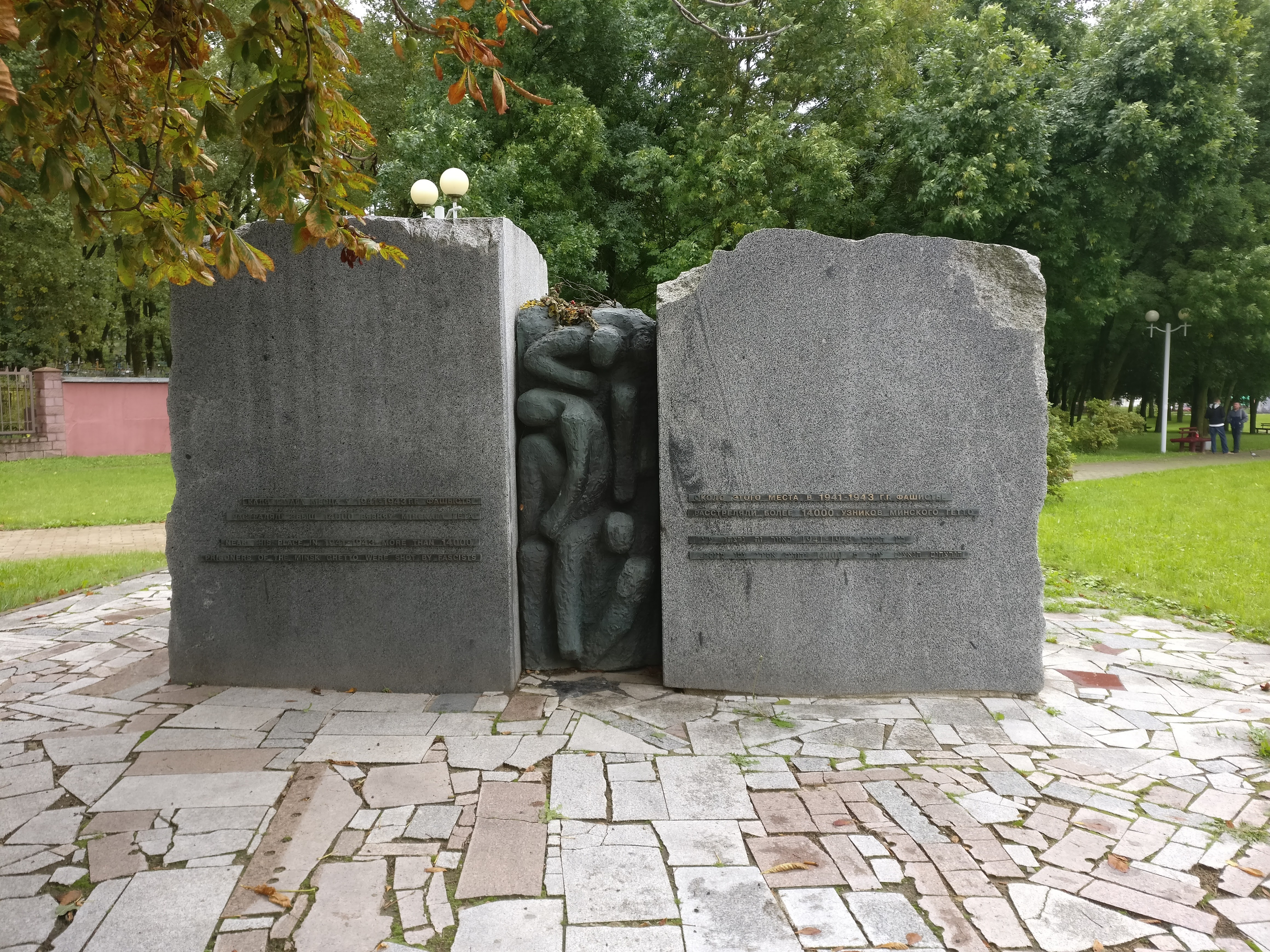
The monument to victims of Minsk ghetto at Pritytskogo street, Minsk, Belarus

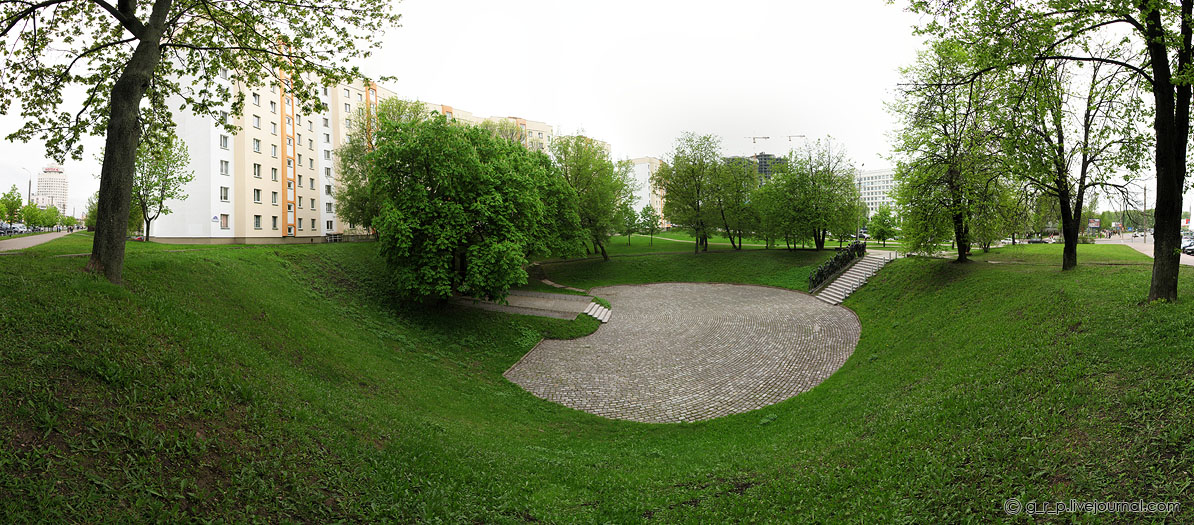
The "Pit memorial" with obelisk on the left (obscured) and group sculpture on the staircase on the right.

As in many other ghettos, Jews were forced to work in factories or other German-run operations. Ghetto inhabitants lived in extremely poor conditions, with insufficient stocks of food and medical supplies.

On 2 March 1942, the ghetto's nursery or orphanage was "liquidated"; the children were buried alive in a pit after the murderers had tossed them candy:

At that moment, several SS officers, among them Wilhelm Kube, arrived, whereupon Kube, immaculate in his uniform, threw handfuls of sweets to the shrieking children. All the children perished in the sand.

In March 1942, approximately 5,000 Jews were killed nearby where "The Pit" memorial to the Minsk ghetto now stands. On 31 March, the Germans raided the ghetto to arrest Resistance leaders, and much of the ghetto, including the synagogue, was burned.

Between July 28 and 31, 1942, the ghetto experienced its largest mass murder, with estimates of those executed ranging from 18,000 to 30,000.

By August, fewer than 9,000 Jews were left in the ghetto, according to German official documents. The ghetto was liquidated on 21 October 1943, and 1,500 Minsk Jews were subsequently killed in the Sobibor extermination camp. Several thousand were massacred at Maly Trostenets extermination camp (before the war, Maly Trostenets was a village a few miles to the east of Minsk).

Approximately fifty German and Austrian Jews from the Sonderghetto survived the war, mostly young men who were deported from the ghetto to Poland. There were only a few Jewish survivors remaining in the city when the Red Army retook it on 3 July 1944. Out of an initial Jewish population of 70,000–75,000 in Minsk, only 5,000 Jews survived, a figure that does not include those who fled before Germany captured the city.

== Soviet reaction ==
The Soviet government was aware of the mass murder of Jews as early as November 1941; a booklet published in the same year mentioned the mass executions taking place in Minsk.

In 1944, an article published in Pravda claimed that 120,000 people were tortured and murdered in Minsk. However, the victims were described as Soviet citizens, with Jews specifically mentioned only among those brought from Hamburg.

== Underground ==
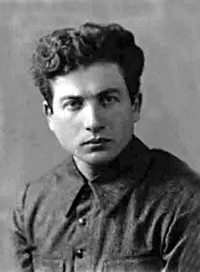
Mikhail Gebelev, Head of Resistance

The Minsk Ghetto is notable for its large-scale resistance organization, which at one point numbered 450 members and cooperated closely with Soviet partisans. Approximately 10,000 Jews were able to escape the ghetto and join partisan groups in the nearby forests. Barbara Epstein states that nowhere else did such a high proportion of Jews manage to escape from a ghetto. She attributes this success to the cooperation between Jews and Belarusians, a contrast to the indifference Jews encountered in other countries. Epstein explains this by referring to communist internationalism and the historical weakness of Belarusian nationalism.

The local Judenrat was unique in German-occupied territories for its extensive cooperation with the underground resistance. As a result of this cooperation, none of the original Judenrat board members survived the war. To counter this resistance, the Germans appointed Polish Jews to its leadership.

== Victims ==
- Rokhl Brokhes (1882–c. 1942), writer
- Masha Bruskina (1924–1941), nurse and partisan
- Paula Fürst (1894–c. 1942), educational reformer
- Ida Jenbach (1868–c. 1941), journalist, playwright and screenwright
- Cläre Tisch (1907–c. 1942), economist

=== Survivors ===
- Elena Drapkina (1924–2016), partisan
- Hanna Krasnapiorka (1925–2000), writer and journalist
- Heinz Rosenberg (1921–1997), writer
- Anatoly Rubin (1927–2017), Soviet dissident
- Simcha Zorin (1902–1974), partisan

== See also ==
- Maly Trostenets extermination camp
- The Holocaust in Belarus
- Jewish ghettos of Europe
