= Rokhl Brokhes =

Rokhl Brokhes (Yiddish: רחל בּרכות; September 23, 1880 – 1942 or 1945) was a Yiddish-language writer from Minsk (today in Belarus). She was the author of stories, plays, and children's stories.

== Biography ==
Rokhl Brokhes was born in Minsk, in the Belarusian region of the Russian Empire, into a poor family. Her father, Volf Brokhes, was a maskil (follower of the Haskalah, or Jewish Enlightenment), and taught her Hebrew, enabling her to read both the Bible and modern Hebrew works, such as the novels of Abraham Mapu. Her father died when she was nine years old, and not long afterward she went to work as a seamstress; later she taught needlework at the Jewish Vocational School for Girls in Minsk.

She wrote her first story, "Yankele," when she was 17; it was published two years later in Der Yud, a new bi-weekly Yiddish newspaper based in Warsaw. She subsequently published other stories in Der Yud (which existed until 1902), as well as in the Yiddish daily Der Fraynd, which began publication in St. Petersburg in 1903, and Di Zukunft, in New York City.

Brokhes was married to a dentist, and for some years lived in a small village in the Russian province of Saratov, in the Lower Volga region. During this period she continued writing but was out of touch with the Yiddish literary scene and published little.

In 1920, as famine developed in the Volga region, during the course of the Russian Civil War that had followed the Revolution, Brokhes moved with her family back to Minsk. In the following period of her life in Minsk, when the city was the capital of the Byelorussian Soviet Socialist Republic, she often published her work in the Soviet Yiddish newspaper Der Shtern, or, as it became known from 1924, Oktyabr. During this later period she also wrote many children's stories.

Her works, which, besides many short stories and novellas, also included several dramas, had a realistic bent, with lyrical tendencies and a finely observed psychological dimension; she depicted Jewish family life, especially women and children, and Jewish working-class life. The socialist Yiddish writers Avrom Reyzen and Abraham Liessin (the editor of Di Zukunft) were both admirers of her work, and were among her close acquaintances.

In 1941, the first volume of Brokhes's collected works – a planned eight volumes, including over 200 stories – was being prepared for publication at the State Publishing House of Byelorussia at the time of the Nazi invasion of the region, and the book never appeared.

Brokhes died in the Minsk ghetto.

== Selected works ==
In Yiddish

- A zamlung dertseylungen. Vilna: Farlag fun B. Kletskin, 1922. Collection of seven stories: "Unter-barg", "A bletl", "Di shekhina", "In der un in der gas", "Di zogerin", "In tshad", and "Dem kvure shameses vayb".
- In pyonerishn lager. Minsk, 1936.
- Gelke. Moscow, 1937. Stories.
- Odlerl un shoymele, a vunder-maysele. Moscow: Emes, 1939.
- Shpinen. Minsk: Byelorussian State Publ., 1940.

In English translation

- "The Zogerin" [short story], translated by Shirley Kumove. In: Frieda Forman et al. (Eds.), Found Treasures: Stories by Yiddish Women Writers. Toronto: Second Story Press, 1994. ISBN 9780929005539. p. 85-90.

In French translation

- "Faubourg" [short story], translated by Cécile Neeser Hever. Paris: Éditions Bibliothèque Medem, 2023. ISBN 9791091238199.
