= Tuzhinka =

Tuzhinka Тужинка
- Settlement
- Location within Republic of Buryatia Location within Russia
- Coordinates: 52°18′N 110°32′E
- Country: Russia
- Region: Republic of Buryatia
- District: Yeravninsky District
- Time zone: UTC+8:00

Tuzhinka (Russian: Тужинка; Buryat: Тужа, Tuja) is a rural locality (a settlement) and the administrative centre of Tuzhinkinskoye Rural Settlement, Yeravninsky District, Republic of Buryatia, Russia. The population was 507 as of 2017. There are 8 streets.

== Geography ==
Tuzhinka is located 78 km southwest of Sosnovo-Ozerskoye (the district's administrative centre) by road. Ust-Egita is the nearest rural locality.
