= Zadorye =

Zadorye Задорье
- Village
- Location within Arkhangelsk Oblast Location within Russia
- Coordinates: 61°15′N 43°38′E
- Country: Russia
- Region: Arkhangelsk Oblast
- District: Ustyansky District
- Time zone: UTC+3:00

Zadorye (Russian: Задорье) is a rural locality (a village) in Bereznitskoye Rural Settlement of Ustyansky District, Arkhangelsk Oblast, Russia. The population was 99 as of 2010.

== Geography ==
Zadorye is located on the Ustya River, 37 km northeast of Oktyabrsky (the district's administrative centre) by road. Bereznik is the nearest rural locality.
