= Chelyabinsk =

City in Chelyabinsk Oblast, Russia

Chelyabinsk Челябинск
- City
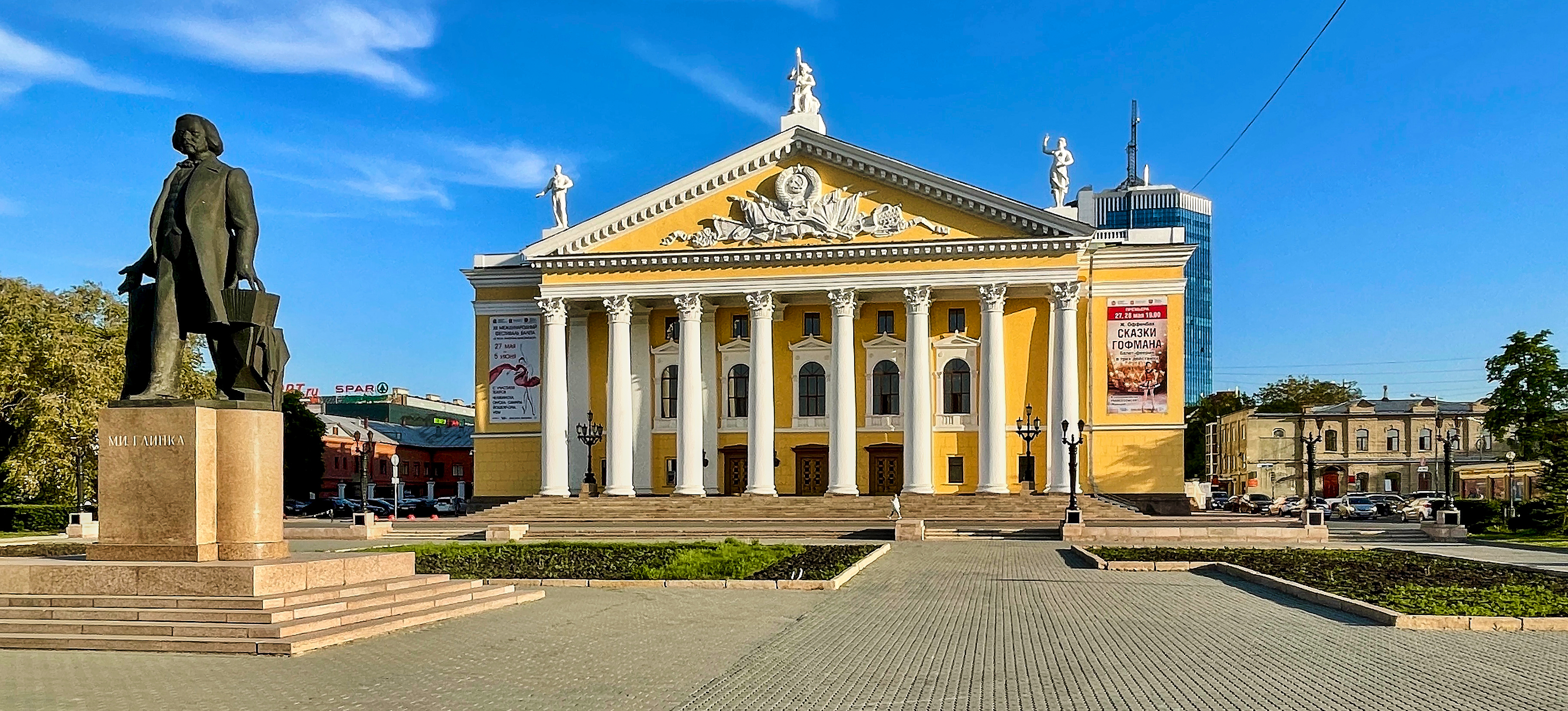
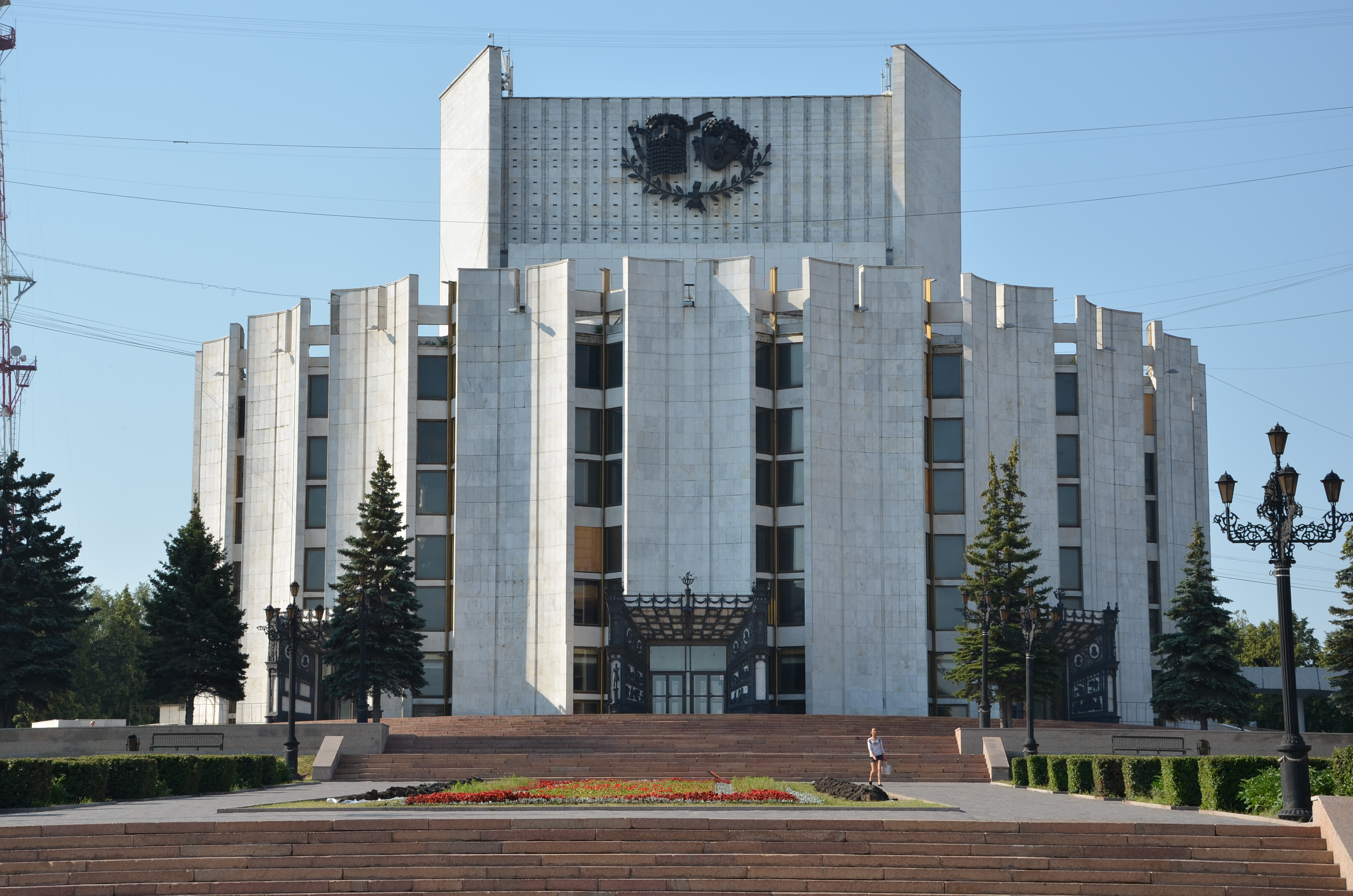
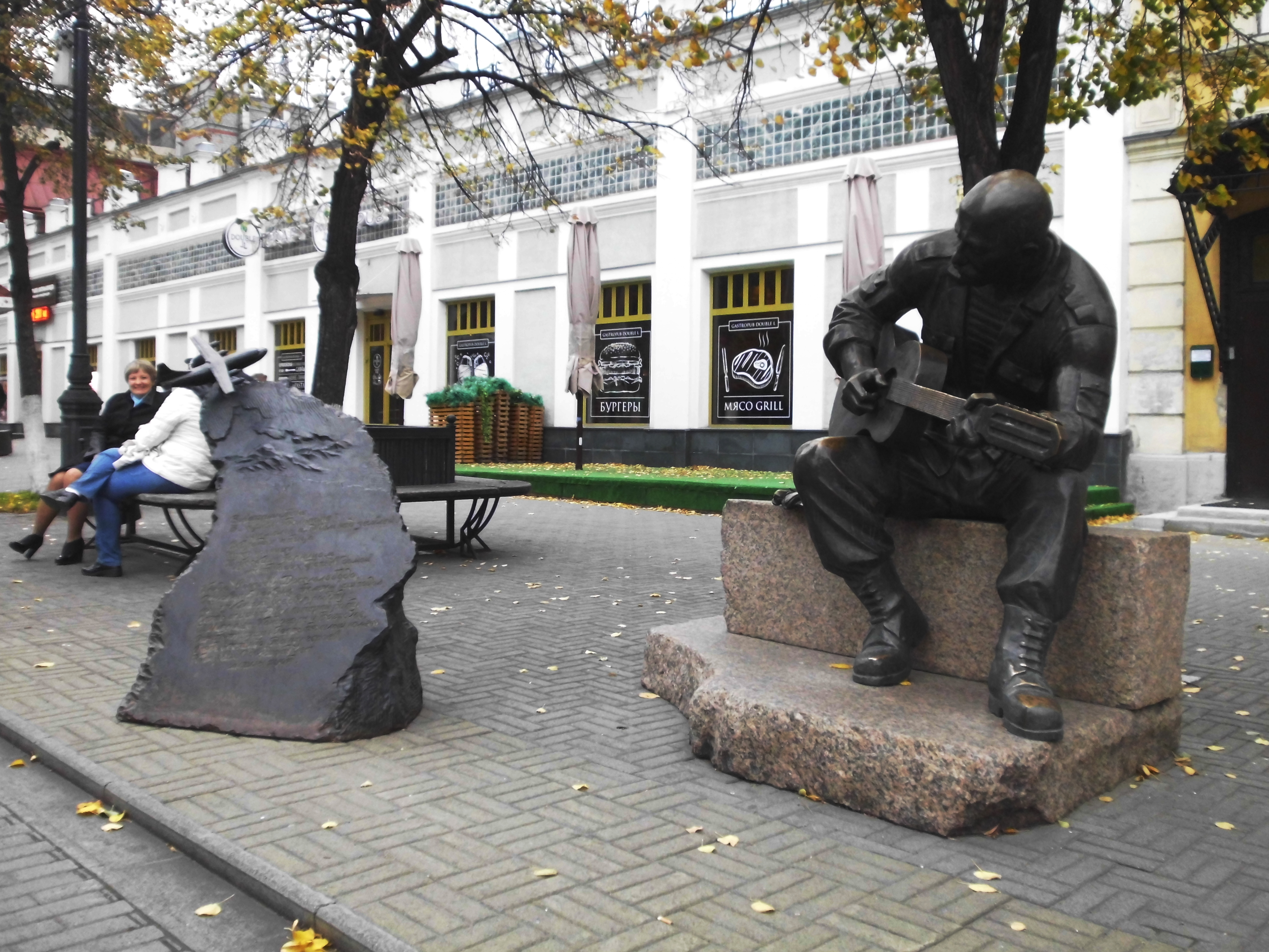
- Chelyabinsk Opera and Ballet Theatre Alexander Nevsky Church N. Orlov Drama Theatre Yunost Sports Palace Monument to Alexander Rosenbaum View of Chelyabinsk

- Flag Coat of arms
- Interactive map of Chelyabinsk
- Location of Chelyabinsk Chelyabinsk (Chelyabinsk Oblast)
- Coordinates: 55°09′17″N 61°22′33″E
- Country: Russia
- Federal subject: Chelyabinsk Oblast
- Founded: 1736
- City status since: 1787

Government
  - Body: City Duma
  - Head: Andronov Denis (acting)

Area
  - Total: 530 km^{2} (200 sq mi)
- Elevation: 220 m (720 ft)

Population (2010 Census)
  - Total: 1,130,132
  - Estimate (2025): 1,156,201 (+2.3%)
  - Rank: 9th in 2010
  - Density: 2,100/km^{2} (5,500/sq mi)

Administrative status
  - Subordinated to: City of Chelyabinsk
  - Capital of: Chelyabinsk Oblast, City of Chelyabinsk

Municipal status
  - Urban okrug: Chelyabinsky Urban Okrug
  - Capital of: Chelyabinsky Urban Okrug
- Time zone: UTC+5 (MSK+2)
- Postal code: 454xxx
- Dialing code: +7 351
- OKTMO ID: 75701000001
- City Day: September 13
- Website: www.cheladmin.ru

Chelyabinsk (Note: /tʃɛlˈjæbɪnsk/; Russian: Челябинск, romanized: Čeljabinsk, IPA: [tɕɪˈlʲæbʲɪnsk]; Bashkir: Силәбе, romanized: Siläbe, [sʲilæˈβɘ]) is the administrative center and largest city of Chelyabinsk Oblast, Russia. It is the seventh-largest city in Russia, with a population of over 1.1 million people, and the second-largest city in the Ural Federal District, after Yekaterinburg. Chelyabinsk is located to the east behind the south part of the Ural Mountains and runs along the Miass River.

The area of Chelyabinsk contained the ancient settlement of Arkaim, which belonged to the Sintashta culture. In 1736, a fortress by the name of Chelyaba was founded on the site of a Bashkir village. Chelyabinsk was granted town status by 1787. Chelyabinsk began to grow rapidly by the early 20th century as a result of the construction of railway links from the Russian core to Siberia, including the Trans-Siberian Railway. Its population reached 70,000 by 1917. Under the Soviet Union, Chelyabinsk became a major industrial centre during the 1930s. The Chelyabinsk Tractor Plant was built in 1933. During World War II, the city was a major contributor to the manufacture of tanks and ammunition.

In the 1990s and 2000s, a number of industries in Chelyabinsk ceased to exist due to the difficult economic situation, As of the 2020s, it continues to experience difficulties in the areas of ecology, economic spheres, and urban improvement. Nevertheless, it is one of the largest industrial centers of the Urals, where industry accounts for almost 40% of the gross municipal product, especially heavy industries such as metallurgy and military production. It is home to several educational institutions, mainly South Ural State University and Chelyabinsk State University.

== History ==
=== Ancient Sintashta civilization ===
Archaeologists have discovered ruins of the ancient town of Arkaim in the vicinity of the city of Chelyabinsk. Ruins and artifacts in Arkaim and other sites in the region indicate a relatively advanced civilization existing in the area since the 2nd millennium BC, which was of proto-Indo-Iranian origin.

The Arkaim site, located in the Sintashta-Petrovka cultural area, was known by Russian archaeologists for at least 70 years, but it was mostly ignored by non-Russian anthropological circles. The borders of the Sintashta-Petrovka cultural area run along the eastern Urals of the Eurasian steppe to about 400 km (249 mi) south of Chelyabinsk and to the east for about 200 km (124 mi). Twenty-three archaeological sites are recognized as being part of this area.

The sites resemble towns, laid out in round, square, or oval shapes. Although most of the sites have been discovered by aerial photography, only two, Arkaim and Sintashta, have been thoroughly excavated. These sites are characterized by their fortification, connected houses, and extensive evidence of metallurgy.

The people of the Sintashta culture are thought to have spoken Proto-Indo-Iranian, the ancestor of the Indo-Iranian language family. This identification is based primarily on similarities between their language in comparison to sections of the Rigveda, and based on funerary rituals of the Sintashta culture, as revealed by archaeological studies in the area.

=== Modern Russian history ===
The fortress of Chelyaba, from which the city takes its name, was founded at the location of the Bashkir village of Chelyaby (Bashkir: Силәбе, romanized: Siläbe) by Colonel Alexey (Kutlu-Muhammed) Tevkelev in 1736 to protect the surrounding trade routes from possible attacks by Bashkir outlaws. During Pugachev's Rebellion, the fortress withstood a siege by the rebel forces in 1774, but was eventually captured for several months in 1775. In 1782, Chelyabinsk became a seat of the uyezd of Ufa Viceroyalty, which was later reformed into Orenburg Governorate. In 1787, Chelyabinsk was granted town status by the government.

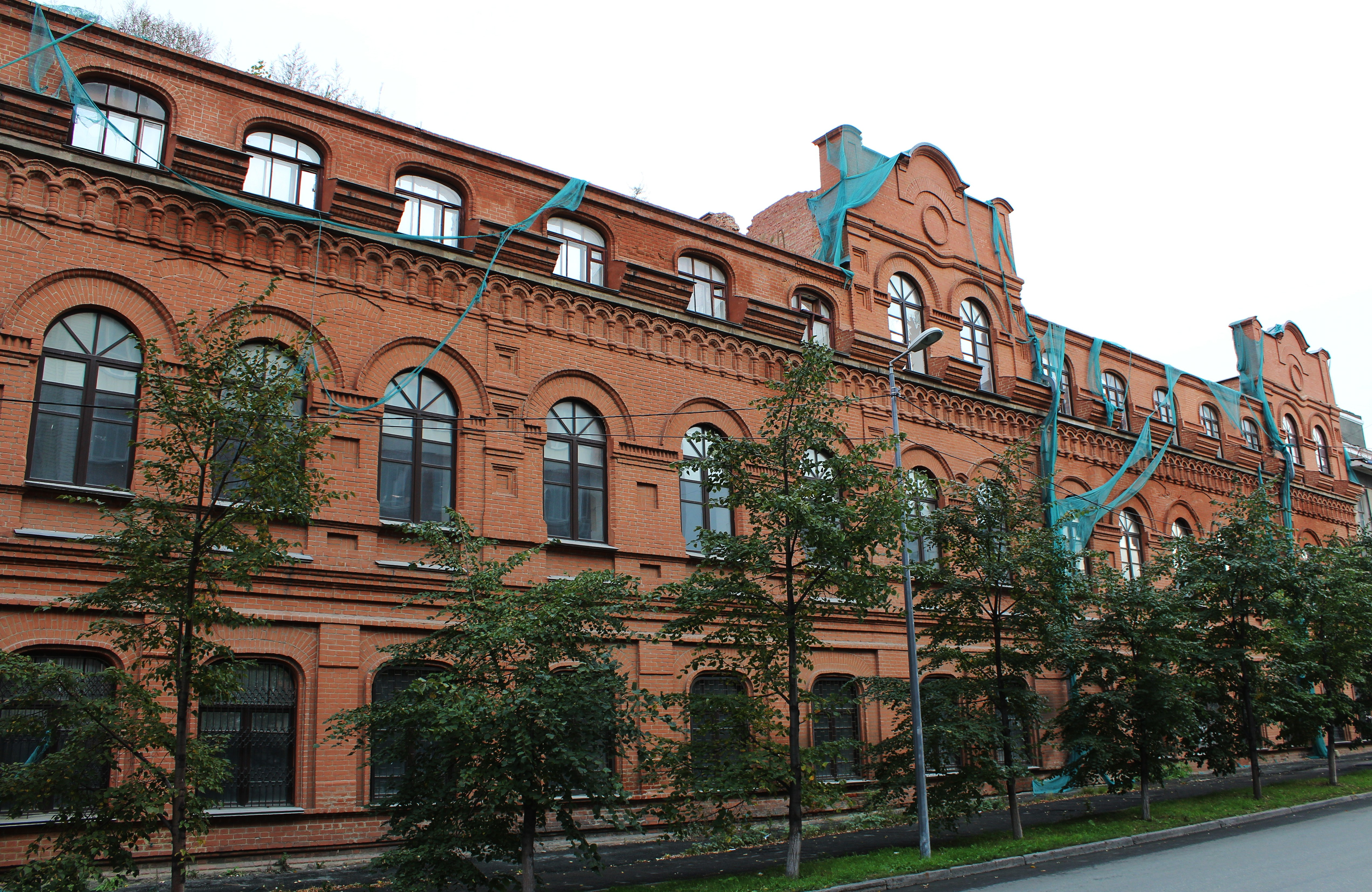
Kuznetsov's tea-packing factory (1898)

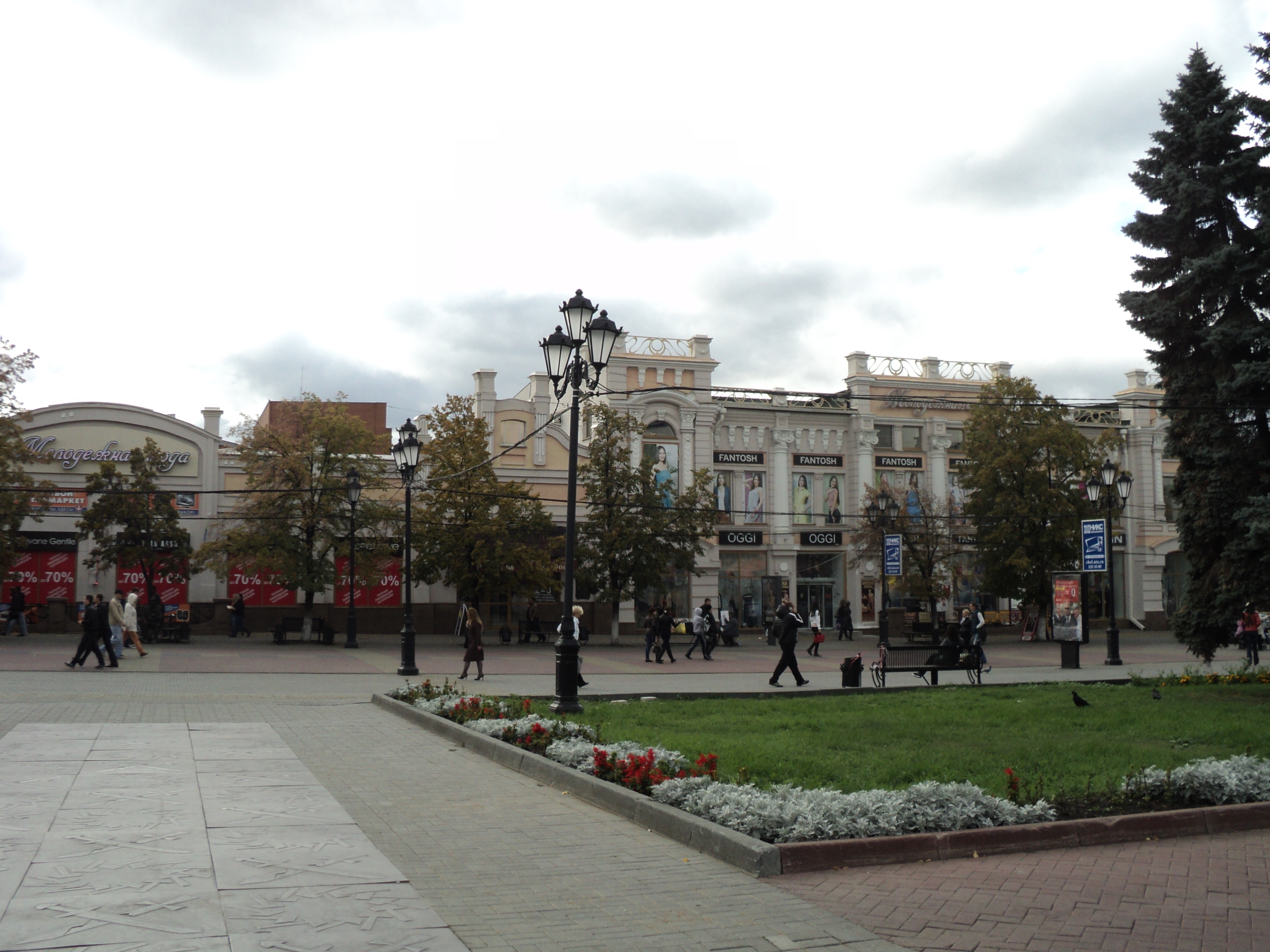
Valeyev's trading house (1911)

Until the late 19th century, Chelyabinsk was a small provincial town. In 1892, the Samara-Zlatoust Railway was completed, which connected it with Moscow and the rest of European Russia. Also in 1892, construction of the Trans-Siberian Railway started from Chelyabinsk, and in 1896, the city was linked to Ekaterinburg. Chelyabinsk then became the main hub for travel to Siberia. For 15 years, more than fifteen million people – a tenth of Russia's population at the time – passed through Chelyabinsk. Some of them remained in Chelyabinsk, which contributed to its rapid growth. In addition, a so-called "customs fracture" was created in Chelyabinsk, which imposed duties on the shipment of goods between the European and Asian parts of Russia, which led to the emergence of mills and notably, a tea-packing factory. As a result, Chelyabinsk became a major trade center. Its population reached 20,000 inhabitants by 1897, 45,000 by 1913, and 70,000 by 1917. Because of its rapid growth at the turn of the 20th century, similar to that of midwestern American cities, Chelyabinsk was sometimes called "the Chicago of the Urals".

During the first five-year plans of the 1930s, Chelyabinsk experienced rapid industrial growth. Several important factories, including the Chelyabinsk Tractor Plant and the Chelyabinsk Metallurgical Plant, were built at this time. During World War II, Joseph Stalin decided to move a large part of Soviet manufacturing to areas removed from the reach of the advancing German military as part of a general exodus from western occupied areas. This brought new industries and thousands of workers to Chelyabinsk, including facilities for the production of T-34 tanks and Katyusha rocket launchers. During World War II, the city's industries produced 18,000 tanks and 48,500 tank diesel engines as well as over 17 million units of ammunition. During that time Chelyabinsk was informally called "Tankograd" ("Tank City"). During World War II, the S.M. Kirov Factory no. 185 or "OKMO" was moved to Chelyabinsk from Leningrad to produce heavy tanks, although it was transferred to Omsk after 1962.

=== 2013 meteor ===
Shortly after dawn on 15 February 2013, a superbolide meteor descended at over 55,000 kilometers per hour (34,000 mph) over the Ural Mountains, exploding at an altitude of 25–30 kilometers (16–19 mi).

The meteor created a momentary flash brighter than the sun and generated a shock wave that injured over a thousand people. Fragments fell in and around Chelyabinsk. Interior Ministry spokesman Vadim Kolesnikov said 1,100 people had called for medical assistance following the incident, mostly for treatment of injuries from broken glass by the explosions. One woman suffered a broken spine. Kolesnikov also said about 600 square meters (6,000 sq ft) of a roof at a zinc factory had collapsed. A spokeswoman for the Emergency Ministry told the Associated Press that there was a meteor shower; however, another ministry spokeswoman was quoted by the Interfax news agency as saying it was a single meteor. The size has been estimated at 17 meters (56 ft) diameter with a mass of 10,000 to 11,000 metric tons (22–24 million lb). The power of the explosion was about 500 kilotons of TNT (about 1.8 PJ), which is 20–30 times more energy than was released from the atomic bomb detonated in Hiroshima. The city avoided larger casualties and destruction due to the shallow entry angle of the meteor, which caused a relatively high altitude for the explosion and distributed its energy over a larger area.

== Administrative and municipal status ==
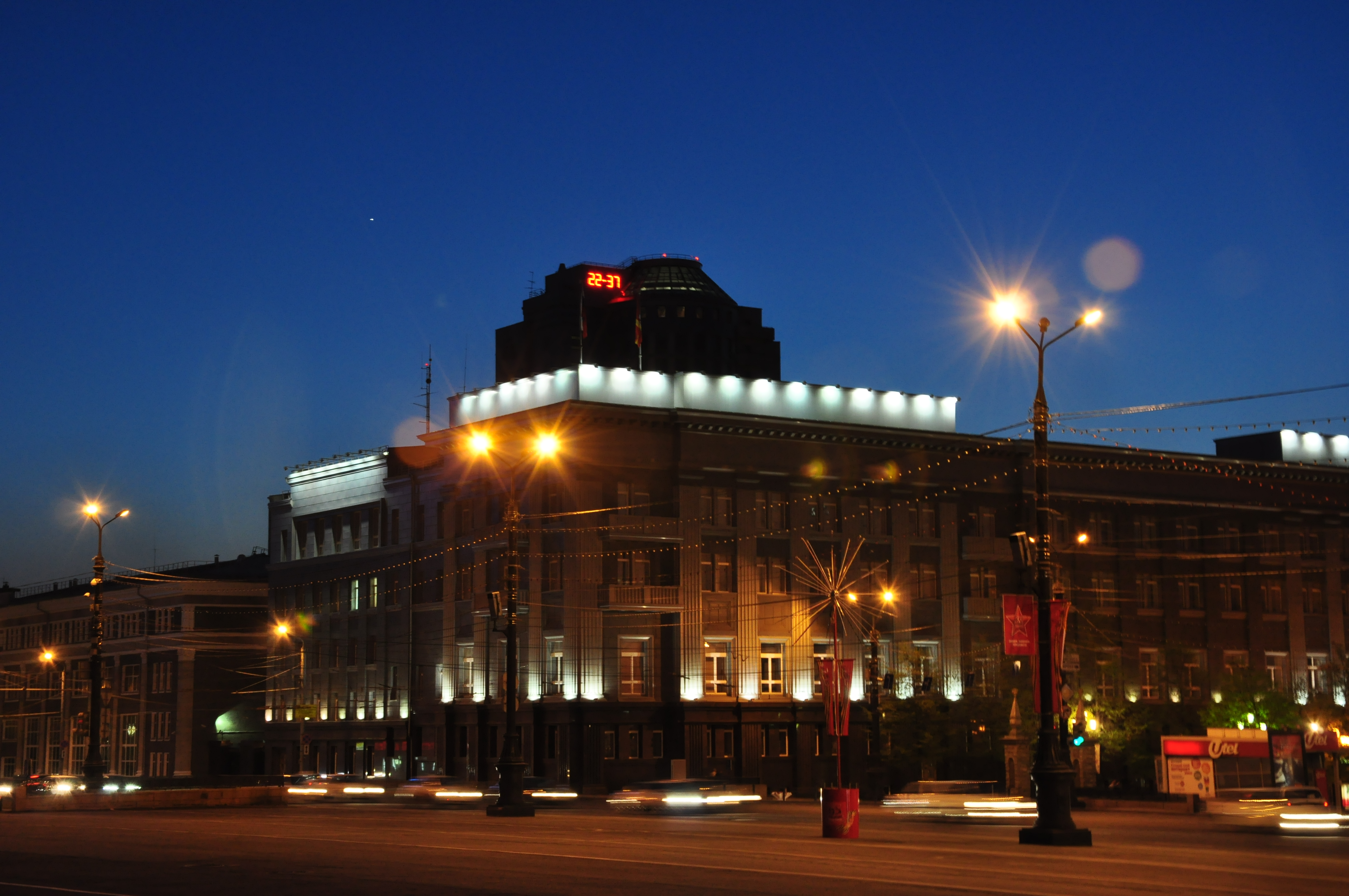
The building of the Legislative Assembly of Chelyabinsk Oblast

Chelyabinsk is the administrative center of the oblast. Within the framework of administrative divisions, it is incorporated as the City of Chelyabinsk, an administrative unit with a status equal to that of the oblast's districts. As a municipal division, the City of Chelyabinsk is incorporated as Chelyabinsky Urban Okrug. In June 2014, Chelyabinsk's seven city districts were granted civil status.

=== Administrative districts ===
Administrative districts of Chelyabinsk

Chelyabinsk is divided into seven administrative districts.

No.	District	Population as of 2018
1	Kalininsky	224,391
2	Kurchatovsky	223,566
3	Leninsky	191,288
4	Metallurgichesky	138,156
5	Sovetsky	137,533
6	Traktorozavodsky	183,909
7	Tsentralny	100,015

== Geography ==
Chelyabinsk is located east behind the south part of the Ural Mountains, 200 kilometres (124 mi) south of Yekaterinburg. It is elevated 200–250 metres (656–820 ft) above sea level.

The city is bisected by the Miass River, which is regarded as the border between the Urals and Siberia. This is reflected in the geology of the area, with the granite foothills of the Ural Mountains to the west and the lower sedimentary rock of the West Siberian Plain to the east.

The Leningrad Bridge crosses the river, due to this it is known as "the bridge between the Urals and Siberia". Chelyabinsk itself is located in the Southern Urals, west of this boundary, on the European side.

Like Rome, Constantinople, San Francisco and Moscow, Chelyabinsk is said to be located on seven hills.

=== Urban layout ===
The city of Chelyabinsk developed as a fortress. The first streets began to appear soon after the construction of the fortress on the right (southern) bank of the Miass River - already in September 1736. No residential buildings were built directly in the fortress itself; the houses of the inhabitants were located in the adjoining settlement, which was surrounded by a defensive wall. The very first street was formed between the northern wall of the fortress and the Miass River. A fragment of it is shown already in the foreground of the Chelyabinsk Fortress, attached by Colonel A.I. Tevkelev to his report to V.N. Tatishchev on 10 September 1736. Soon it received the name Sibirskaya (now Truda Street), since outside Chelyabinsk it crossed into the Siberian tract leading to Tobolsk. Apparently, there were also other names: in a number of sources it is called Bolshaya Beregovaya, as mentioned in a document dated 10 March 1753. The western end of the street in the last years of the 18th century acquired an independent name – on the pasture near the outskirts of the Ivanovo fair appeared. Apparently, according to it, this part of the street began to be called Sibirskaya-Ivanovskaya (as it is called in the list of 1795). Then, already in the 19th century, it was a little later upstream and downstream of the Miass (that is, west and east of the fortress). Perpendicular to the river, several more streets were planned. At first, there were four of them – two each on the western and eastern sides. The first street to the east got its name from the first Chelyabinsk church, consecrated in 1739 in honor of Nicholas the Wonderworker – Nikolayevskaya street (nowadays Sovetskaya). It was one-sided and went west towards the church and the fortress. After the Chelyabinsk fortress was assigned the status of the center of the Isetskaya province in 1743, the construction of administrative buildings began here, and another street was formed between Nikolaevskaya Street and the square with the church, ending in the south with the Orenburg Gate and continuing further after the then city limit by the road to Orenburg - Orenburgskaya (now Tsvillinga Street). On Orenburgskaya Street, in 1787 only four courtyards were counted, and in the list of 1795 it was already called Khristorozhdestvenskaya, and there were eleven courtyards on it. In the 18th and first half of the 19th century, Khristorozhdestvenskaya Street was the main street in the city, it was the place where its social and business life was concentrated. The urban planning on the territory of the historical center of Chelyabinsk almost without changes coincides with the plan of Chelyabinsk in 1838. The Chelyabinsk fortress was built in the center of this territory in 1736. The plan of 1784 was supposed to streamline not only the layout of the city but the development and maintenance of quarters. Along with the city center, a district center and a second city square are being laid in the riverside part. The plans of 1768 and 1784 were not carried out, though the existing Troitskaya Square, Truda Street and Tsvilinga Street are historical traces remained of them. In 1838, the land surveyor Sidorov drew up a new plan to streamline the city. In many ways, it was the starting point for the further development of the city.

By 1934, during the Soviet period and the mass industrialization, about 250 thousand people lived in the city. Large-scale urban planning tasks necessitated the development of the first master plan of the city, executed under the guidance of the architect N. G. Eismont in 1936 (Leningrad-based Russian State Research and Design Institute of Urbanism, architects N. G. Berlinerblau, S. M. Gotlib, N. V. Gromov, K. M. Zaichenko and A. M. Suborov). The estimated population according to the general plan of 1936 was to reach 550 thousand people. The city developed around the historical core, including by cutting down the island birch forest, in the planning of the central part, a rectangular grid of streets was preserved, but with the enlargement of quarters. The Metallurgichesky, Traktorozavodsky and Leninsky districts were built and developed with heavy industry. Along with the city center, the centers of 5 administrative districts were planned, and interconnected by a system of transport highways. The main street – Spartak Street (now Lenin Avenue) – appears as a link between the Traktorozavodsky district, Revolution Square, and the future ensemble of the pre-park square. Historically developed streets of Kirov and Zwilling connected the main square of the city with the system of squares in Zarechye. The master plan of 1936 provided for the creation of urban recreation areas on the basis of Shershnevsky Bor and Lake Smolino, for the first time the issue of creating a large reservoir on the Miass River (Shershnevskoye Reservoir) was raised.

The war prevented the implementation of the master plan in full. The Chelyabinsk industrial complex has become a deep rear defense base of the country. The relocation of 60 industrial enterprises from the center of the country, and the evacuation of the population were accompanied by mass construction of isolated villages from barracks and dugouts in free territories. At the same time, the urban area has grown significantly. The need to streamline the development of the post-war city is one of the driving reasons for the development of a new master plan, carried out in 1947 under the leadership of D. D. Bagarin (Lengiprogor, architects A. Slonimsky, L. Vertousov, engineers J. Rotenberg, I. Benevich and others). The second general plan is designed for a city with a population of more than 700 thousand people (in 1946, 450 thousand people lived in the city). Chelyabinsk was considered a center of energy-intensive production, so the main attention was paid to the formation of four industrial hubs based on the capacities of existing enterprises. The main architectural and planning idea was the unification of disparate parts of the city into a single organism – was transferred from the general plan of the pre-war period. Along with the territory of the districts that had reserves for development (Traktorozavodsky – towards Lake First, Metallurgical – with partial use of the territory of Kashtaksky Bor, Leninsky – to Lake Smolino), new sites for promising construction were envisaged (North-West and Churilovo). The issues of transport construction were actively resolved: the creation of a bypass ring highway connecting the city districts, the routing of the main highways from east to west (Pobedy Avenue, Khudyakov – Dzerzhinsky) and from north to south ("Meridian" and Tchaikovsky Street) with access to the main roads beyond outside the city. In 1951, the master plan was adjusted in terms of the number of floors of the building: the share of multi-storey (up to five floors) buildings increased by reducing the share of 2-storey and estate buildings to 25%.

The third master plan of the city in 1967 was developed by a team of authors from the Chelyabinskgrazhdanproekt Institute. The city had a population of 857,000. The main architectural and planning idea was the active inclusion in the composition of the city of Shershnevsky and Kashtak forests, the Shershnevsky reservoir and the Miass River. Building on the free territories of the northwestern residential area, designed for a population of up to 300 thousand people, as a new direction for the development of the city, proposed by the master plan, has been carried out since the late 1960s. The existing historically polycentric system of the center was enriched by the creation of new complexes: at the turn of the river near Garden Island, along Tchaikovsky Street, and the three-beam center of the northwest. The master plan of 1967 provided for the creation of new main streets and a ring road, and the construction of bridges and overpasses, which were planned to free the city center from transit traffic. In 1990 a new city plan was approved and again in 2021.

=== Climate ===
The city has a humid continental climate (Köppen: Dfb) similar to that of the Canadian prairies, despite being located slightly further north. It features warm summers and cold winters. The average temperature in January is well below the freezing point at −14.9 °C or 5.2 °F. July has a relatively warm average of 19 °C or 66.2 °F, and the annual average is a few degrees above the freezing point at 3 °C or 37.4 °F, indicating some moderation. The range of extremes allegedly reaches 70 °C or 130 °F, claimed to be typical of a mid-to-high-latitude climate on a large continent such as Eurasia.

The majority of precipitation occurs in the summer, with less in the winter. The month of July experiences the most, with an average 87 millimetres or 3.43 inches of precipitation, while January, the driest month, experiences 15 millimetres or 0.59 inches. Total precipitation reaches an average of 429 millimetres or 16.89 inches annually, consistent with the city's semi-arid influence. On average, 119 days of the year experience precipitation.

Climate data for Chelyabinsk
Month	Jan	Feb	Mar	Apr	May	Jun	Jul	Aug	Sep	Oct	Nov	Dec	Year
Record high °C (°F)	4.9 (40.8)	5.6 (42.1)	19.9 (67.8)	34.9 (94.8)	39.9 (103.8)	39.9 (103.8)	39.9 (103.8)	39.9 (103.8)	34.9 (94.8)	24.9 (76.8)	14.9 (58.8)	9.9 (49.8)	39.9 (103.8)
Mean daily maximum °C (°F)	−10.5 (13.1)	−7.9 (17.8)	1.0 (33.8)	10.6 (51.1)	20.3 (68.5)	24.0 (75.2)	25.2 (77.4)	23.6 (74.5)	17.2 (63.0)	9.3 (48.7)	−0.4 (31.3)	−6.9 (19.6)	8.8 (47.8)
Daily mean °C (°F)	−14.9 (5.2)	−13.4 (7.9)	−4.8 (23.4)	4.7 (40.5)	12.1 (53.8)	18.3 (64.9)	19.3 (66.7)	17.1 (62.8)	10.9 (51.6)	4.1 (39.4)	−5.2 (22.6)	−11.1 (12.0)	3.0 (37.4)
Mean daily minimum °C (°F)	−19.0 (−2.2)	−18.9 (−2.0)	−9.3 (15.3)	−0.3 (31.5)	7.9 (46.2)	12.9 (55.2)	14.5 (58.1)	13.5 (56.3)	7.6 (45.7)	1.3 (34.3)	−5.9 (21.4)	−14.6 (5.7)	−0.9 (30.4)
Record low °C (°F)	−49.9 (−57.8)	−44.9 (−48.8)	−44.9 (−48.8)	−29.9 (−21.8)	−19.9 (−3.8)	−4.9 (23.2)	0.1 (32.2)	0.1 (32.2)	−9.9 (14.2)	−24.9 (−12.8)	−39.9 (−39.8)	−44.9 (−48.8)	−49.9 (−57.8)
Average precipitation mm (inches)	17 (0.7)	16 (0.6)	19 (0.7)	27 (1.1)	47 (1.9)	55 (2.2)	87 (3.4)	44 (1.7)	41 (1.6)	30 (1.2)	26 (1.0)	21 (0.8)	430 (16.9)
Average rainy days	0.1	0.3	4	10	15	19	17	16	16	10	6	1	114
Average snowy days	18	16	15	6	1	0.3	0	0	1	6	15	19	97
Average relative humidity (%)	85	77	76	66	61	64	69	71	73	73	82	83	73
Source 1: Pogoda.ru.net
Source 2: World Meteorological Organization (precipitation days only)

== Population ==
Historical population
Year	Pop.	±%
1897	20,000	—
1926	57,655	+188.3%
1939	273,116	+373.7%
1959	689,049	+152.3%
1970	875,210	+27.0%
1979	1,029,522	+17.6%
1989	1,141,777	+10.9%
2002	1,077,174	−5.7%
2010	1,130,132	+4.9%
2021	1,189,525	+5.3%
Source: Census data

At the time of the official 2010 Census, the ethnic makeup of the city's population whose ethnicity was known (1,082,269) was:

Ethnicity	Population	Percentage
Russians	936,457	86.5%
Tatars	54,400	5.0%
Bashkirs	33,716	3.1%
Ukrainians	15,638	1.4%
Others	42,058	3.9%

== Cityscape ==
Chelyabinsk skyline with the Miass River in the center.

=== Architecture ===
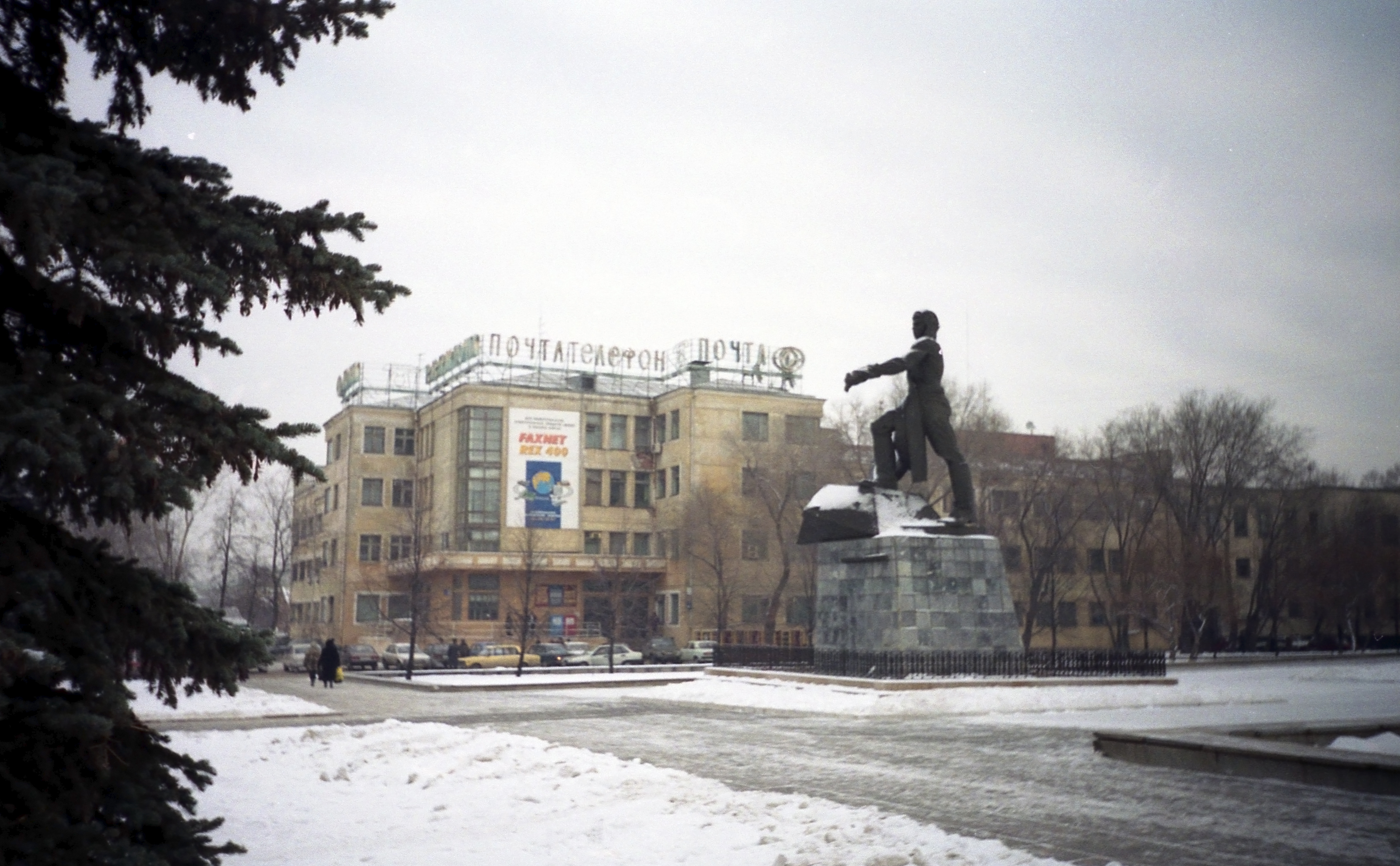
Chelyabinsk main post office (Glavpochtamt) built in constructivist style (1936)

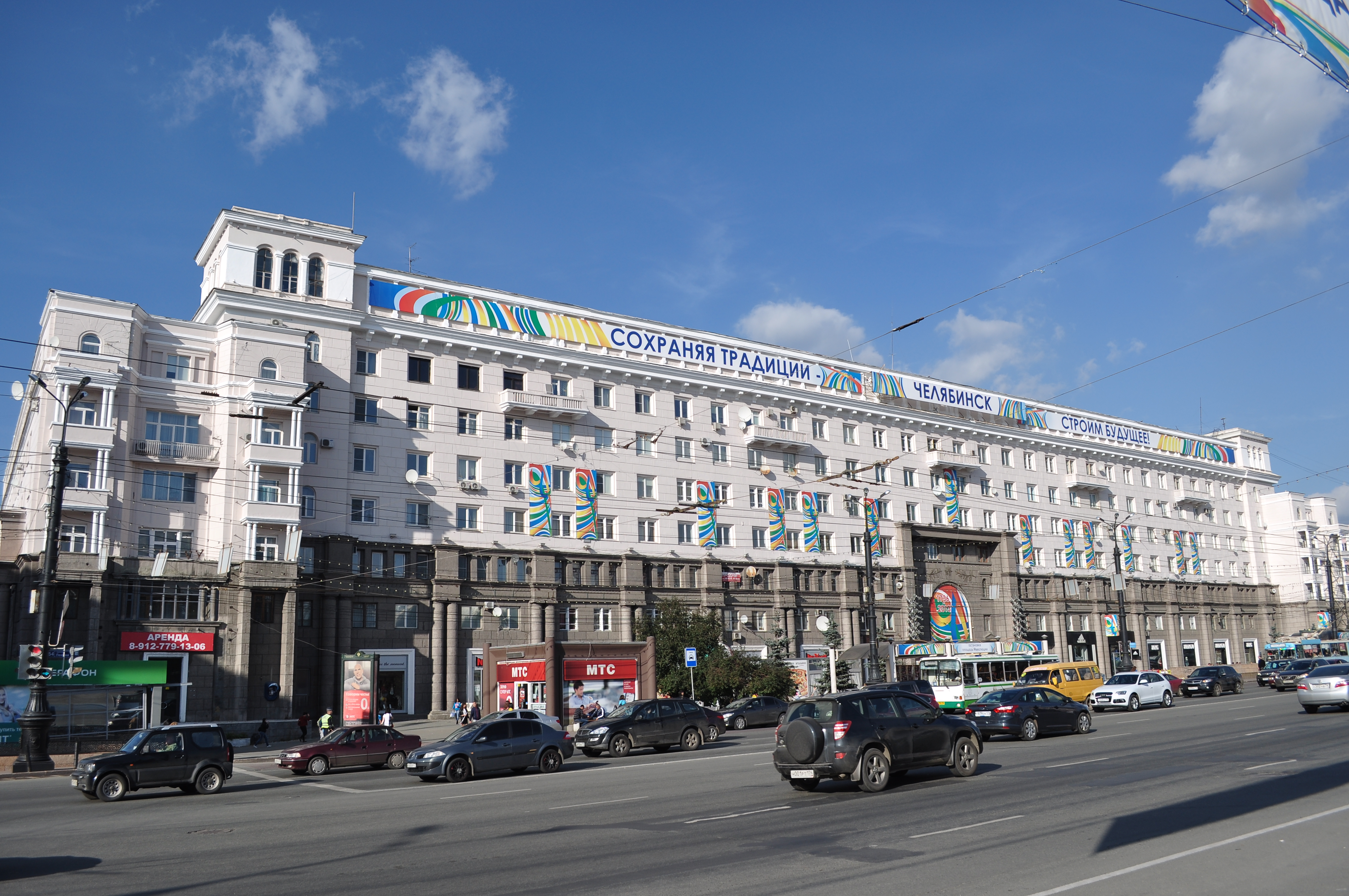
Historical residential building on Revolution Square built in socialist classicism style (1938)

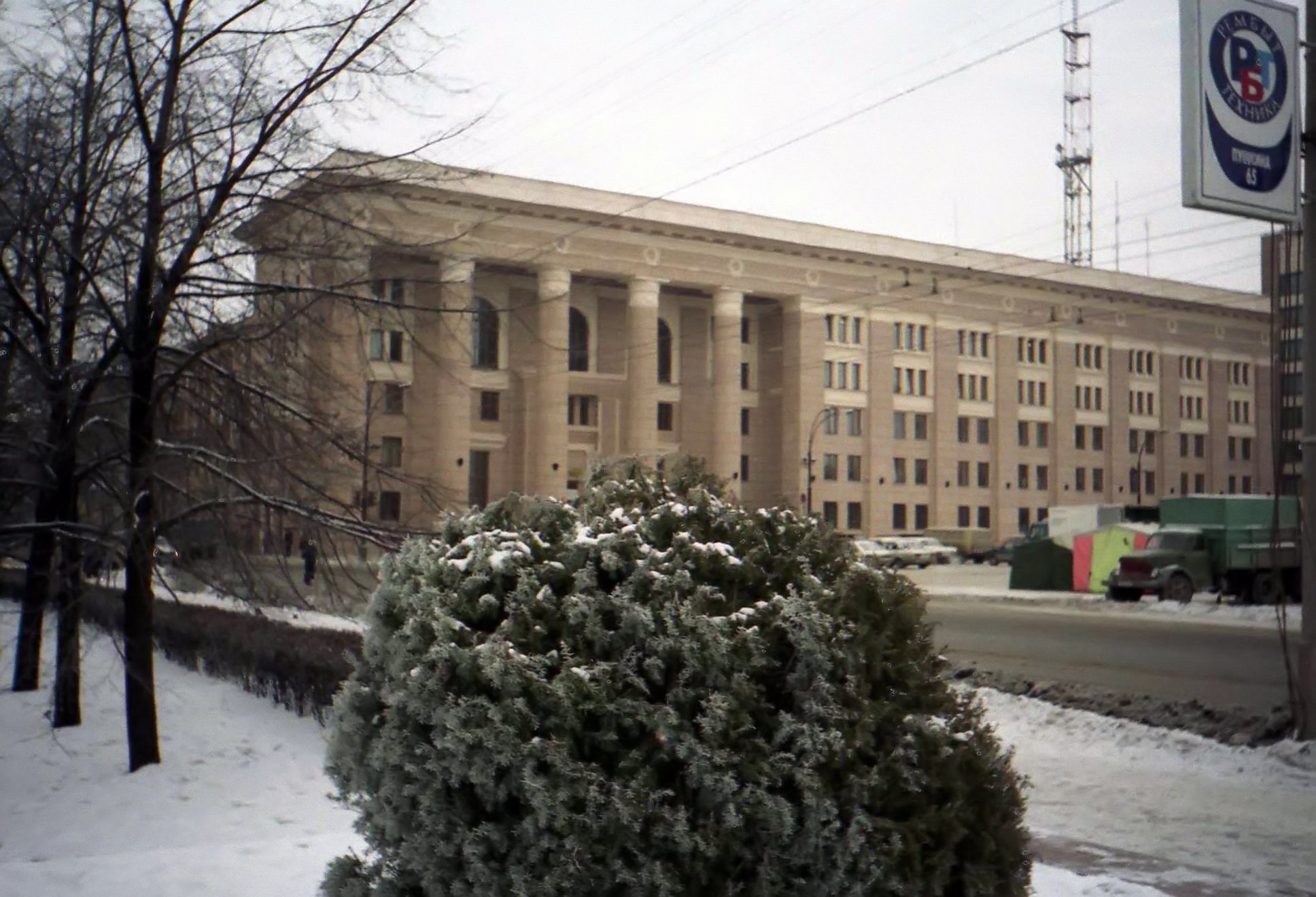
ChelyabEnergo HQ building (1955)

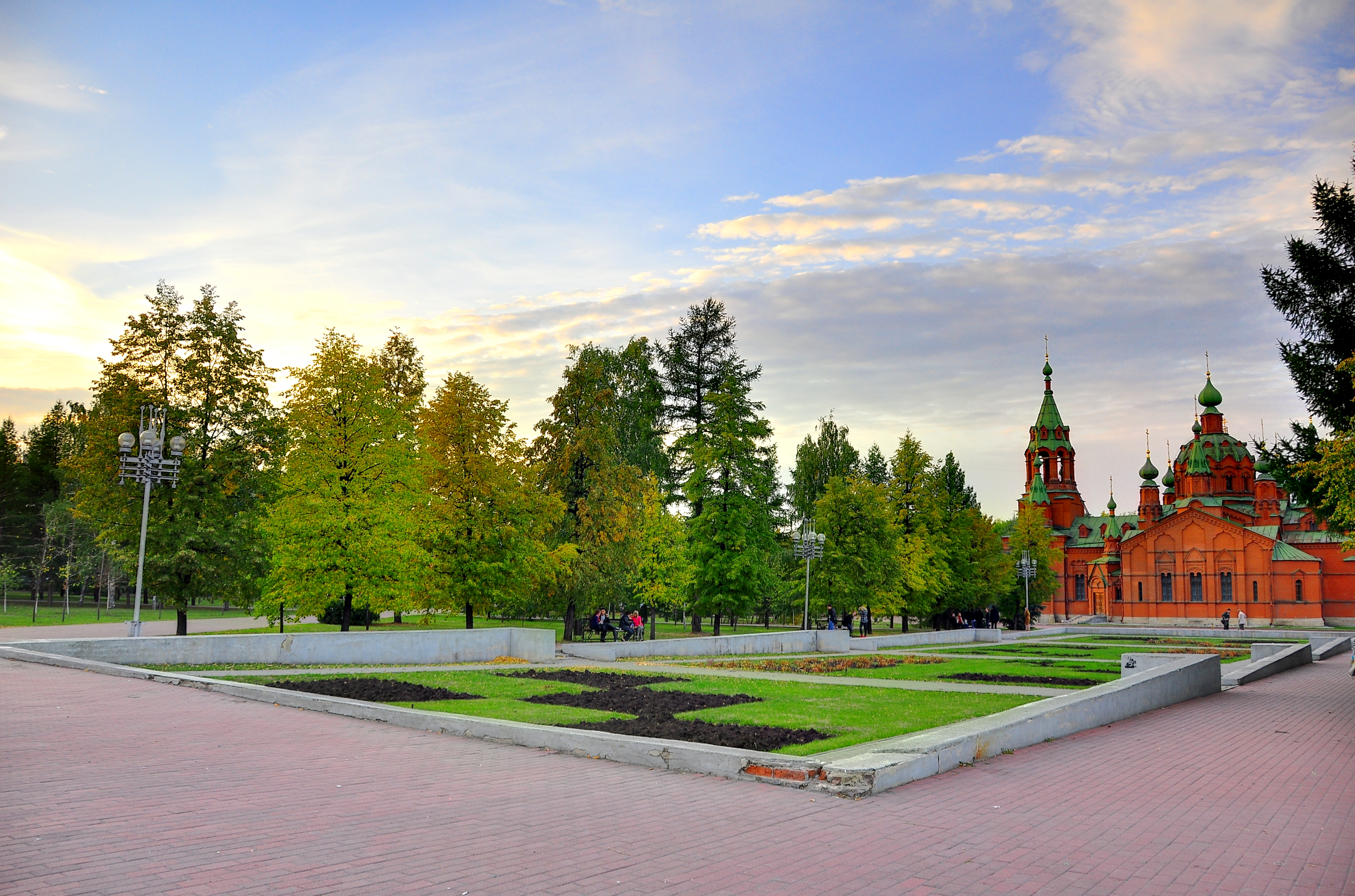
Aloye Pole Park

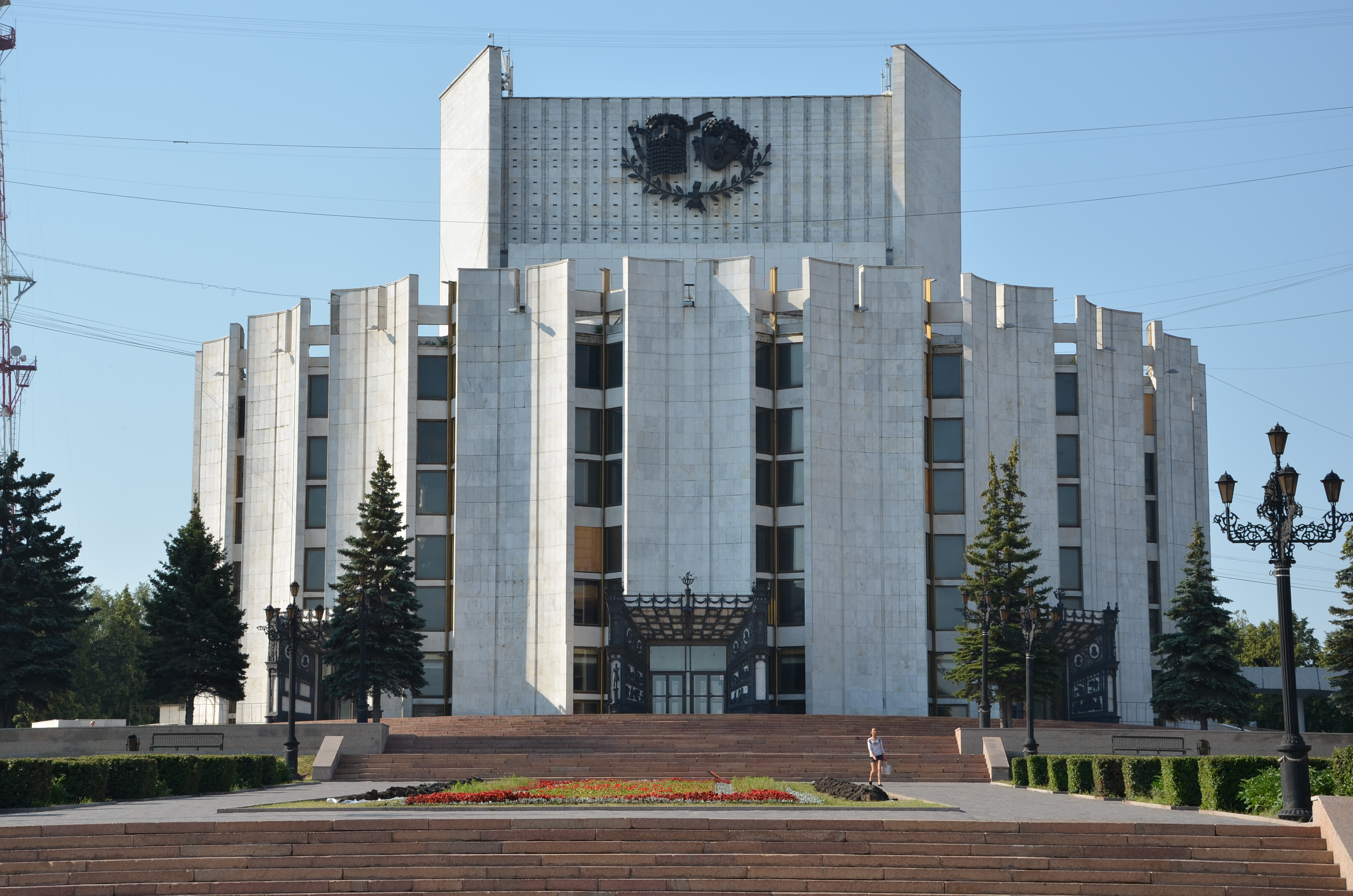
Chelyabinsk Drama Theater

The architecture of Chelyabinsk has been shaped through its history by the progression of historical eras in Russia. Before the 1917 Russian Revolution, the city was a trading center, with numerous merchant buildings in the eclectic and modern styles with elements of Russian Revival architecture, some of which are preserved on the pedestrian-only Kirovka Street. Industrialization in Chelyabinsk started in the late 1920s. The construction of large plants was accompanied by the construction of new residential and public buildings (like the city's main post office) in the constructivist style. Entire constructivist neighborhoods can be seen in the area of the Chelyabinsk Tractor Plant.

In the late 1930s, a new era began in the city, with large-scale construction of Stalinist architecture. Many of the buildings in and around the city center and central avenue are constructed in this style.

The next 60 years saw extensive construction of residential high-rise buildings as the city's population rose to about one million, notably within the large residential area called "Severo-Zapad" ("North-West").

With the market reforms of the 1990s, there was an increase in the construction of office buildings and major shopping malls in postmodern and high-tech styles.

=== Parks and gardens ===
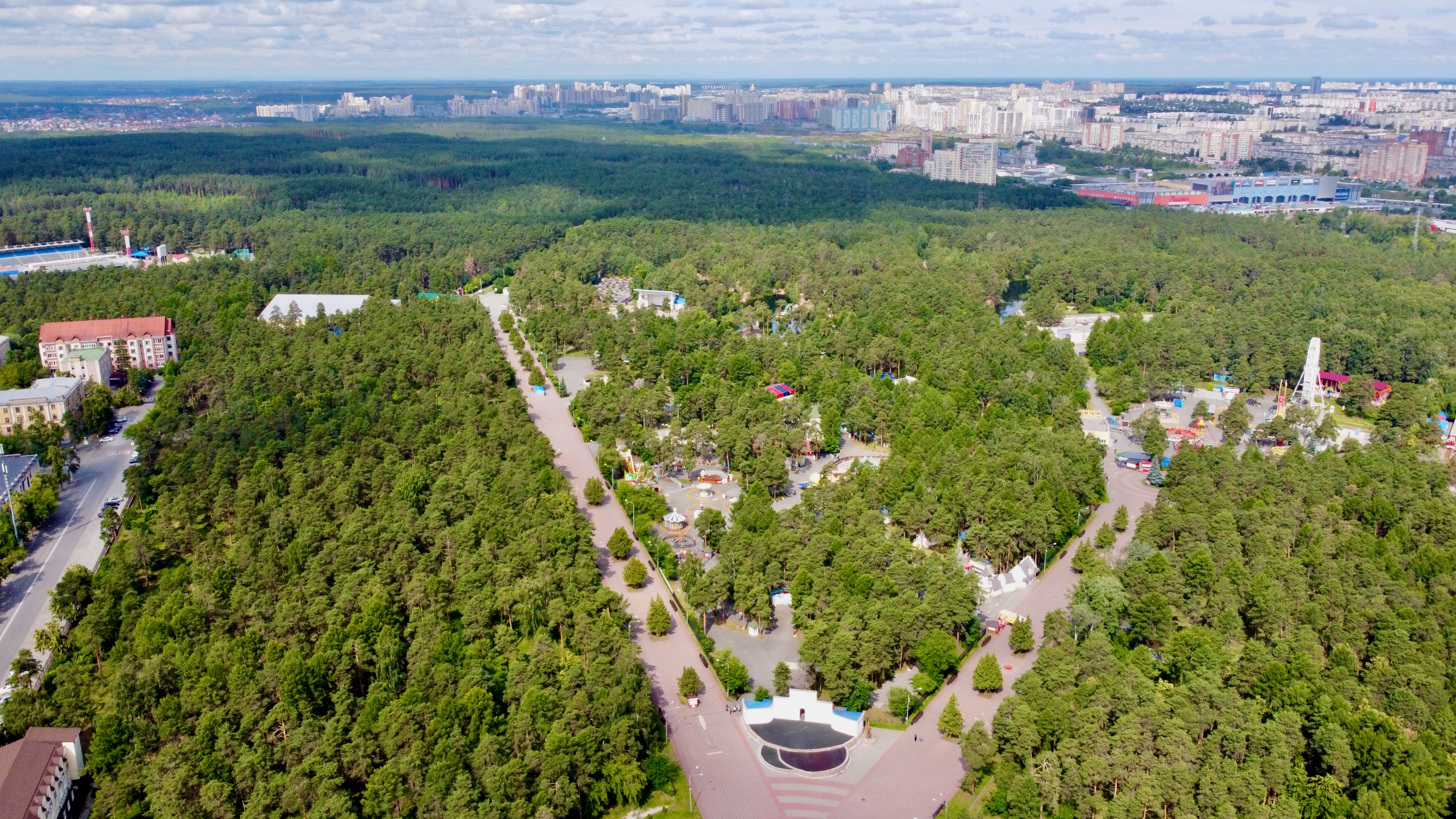
Birdeye view of the Gagarin Central Park in Chelyabinsk

Chelyabinsk has 17 public parks. The largest is Gagarin Central Park. Its territory includes large areas of rocky and forested terrain, located around several now-flooded abandoned quarries.

== Education ==
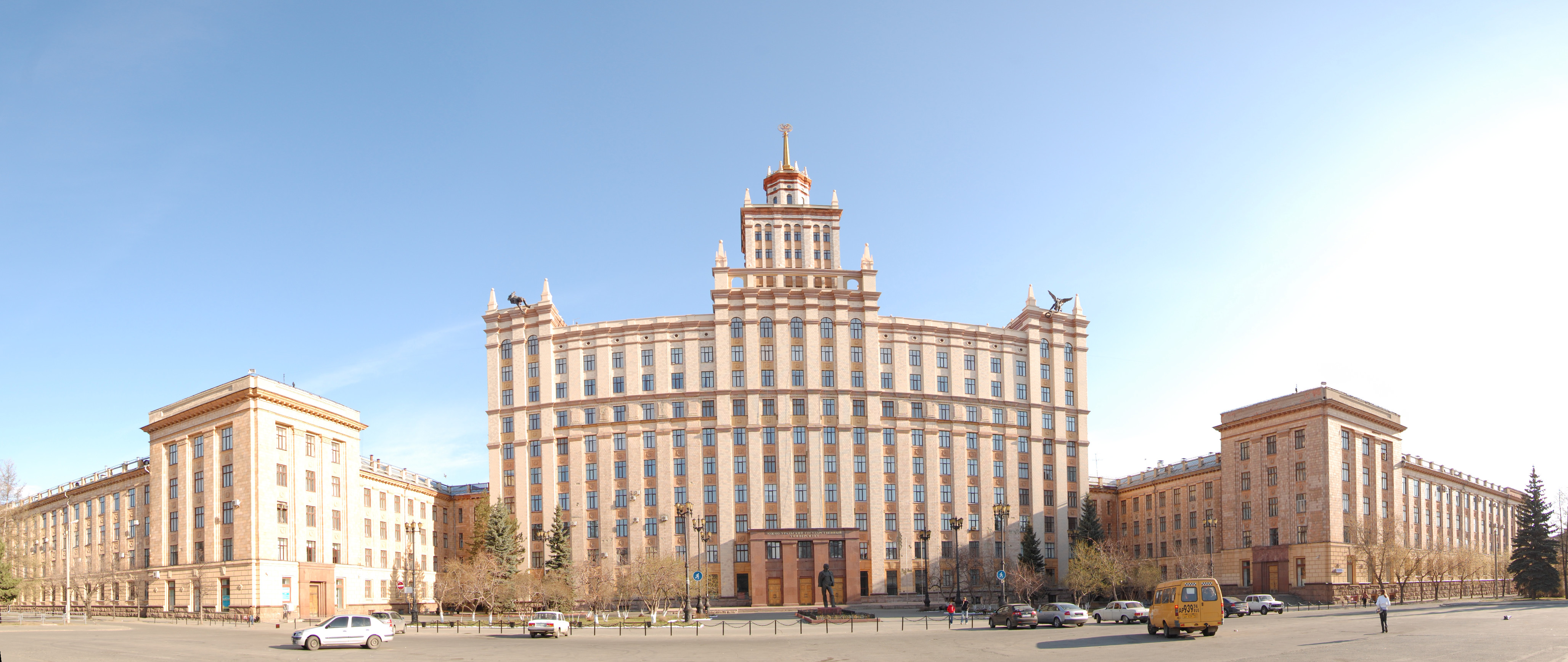
South Ural State University

There are over a dozen universities in Chelyabinsk. The oldest, Chelyabinsk State Agroengineering Academy, was founded in 1930, followed by the Chelyabinsk State Pedagogical University in 1934. Major universities include South Ural State University, Chelyabinsk State University, South Ural State University of Arts, and Chelyabinsk Medical Academy. After World War II, Chelyabinsk became the main center of vocational education in the entire Ural region.

== Economy ==
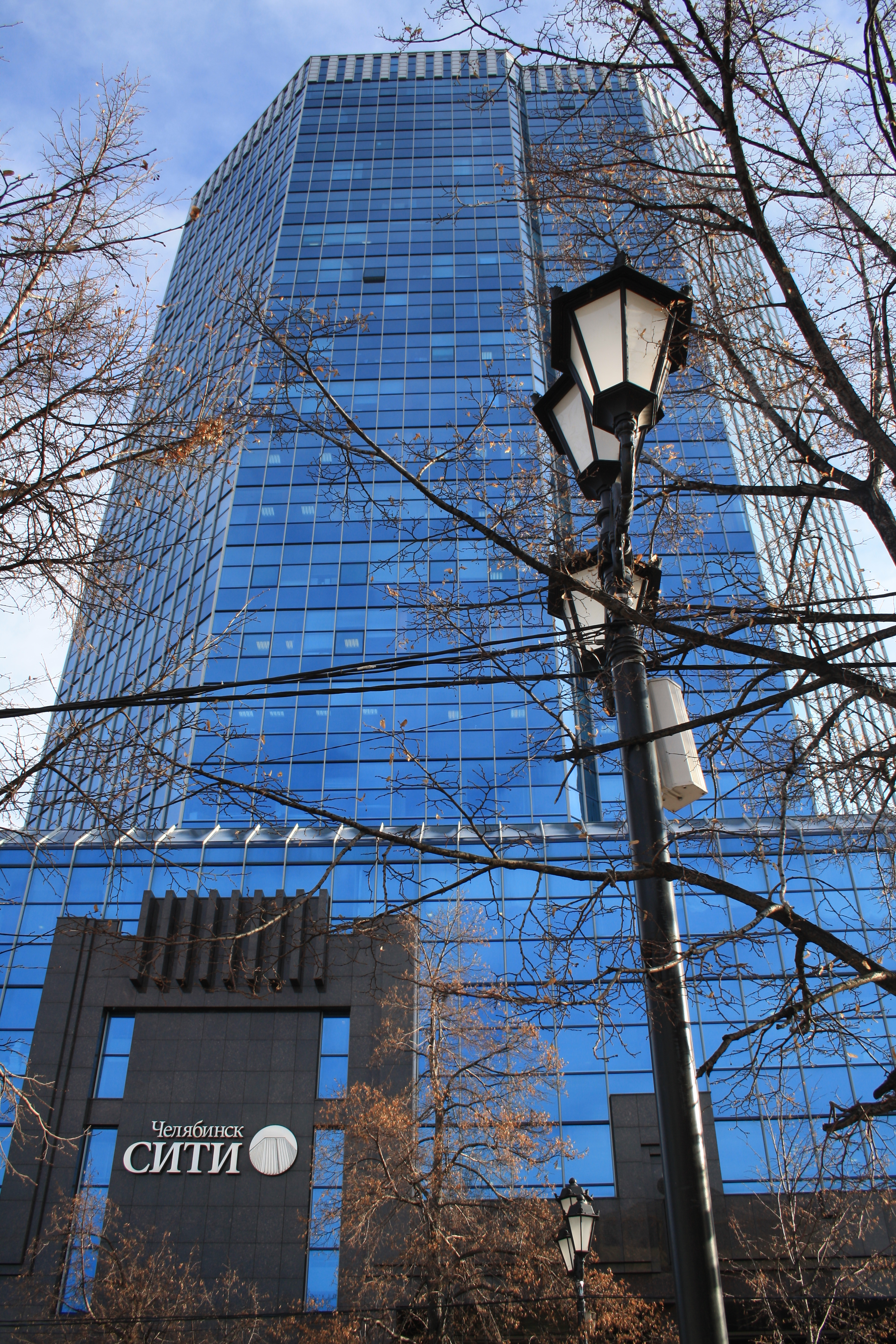
Chelyabinsk-City Office Center, the tallest building in Chelyabinsk.

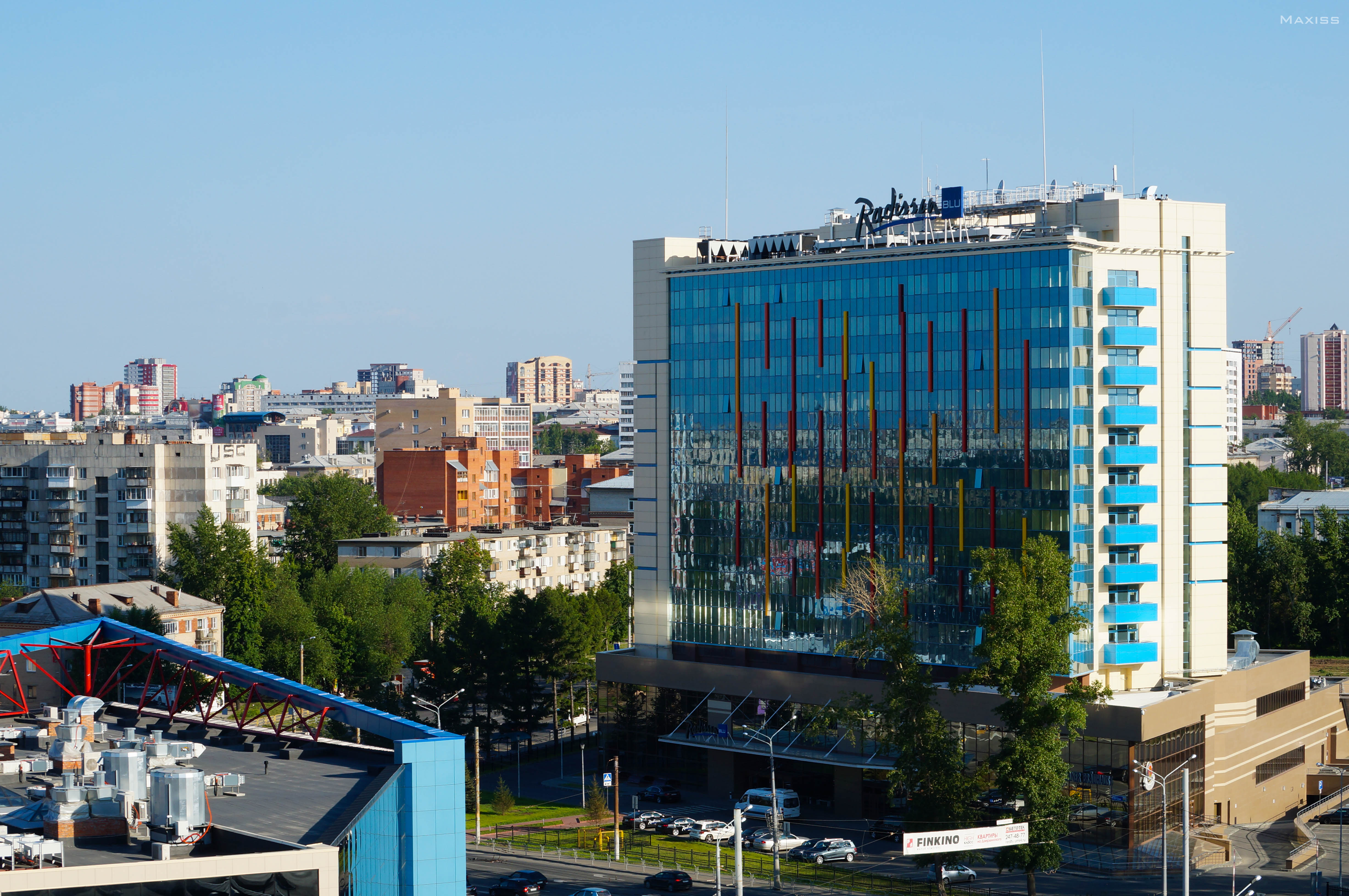
Radisson Blu Hotel

Chelyabinsk is one of the major industrial centers of Russia. Heavy industries, especially metallurgy and military production are predominant in the area, notably the Chelyabinsk Metallurgical Combinate (CMK, ChMK), owned by the mining corporation Mechel. Other important industries include Chelyabinsk Tractor Plant (CTZ, ChTZ), Chelyabinsk Electrode Plant (ChEZ), the machine part-producing Chelyabinsk Forge-and-Press Plant (ChKPZ), the crane-producing Chelyabinsk Mechanical Plant (ChMZ), and Chelyabinsk Tube Rolling Plant (ChTPZ), which is included in the "Big Eight" of pipe producers in Russia, and produces large-diameter pipes for use in pipelines. Chelyabinsk Zinc Plant, owned by the Ural Mining and Metallurgical Company, produces about 2% of the world's zinc supply and over 60% of the Russian supply. Kolyuschenko Road Machinery Plant produces construction machinery and dump trucks for the American manufacturer Terex.

Molnija Watch Factory produces pocket watches, as well as technical watches for use in aircraft and ships. In 1980, Molnija watches were given as gifts to participants of the Moscow Olympic Games.

The agro-industrial company Makfa, the largest producer of pasta in Russia, and one of the five largest producers in the world, is based in Chelyabinsk. The largest manufacturer of footwear in Russia, Unichel Footwear Firm, owns a factory in Chelyabinsk. Chelyabinsk is also home to the agricultural firm Ariant, which leads in the production of beverages and meat products in the Urals Federal District of Russia. The American corporation Emerson Electric owns part of the local company Metran, as well as a factory for the production of industrial equipment.

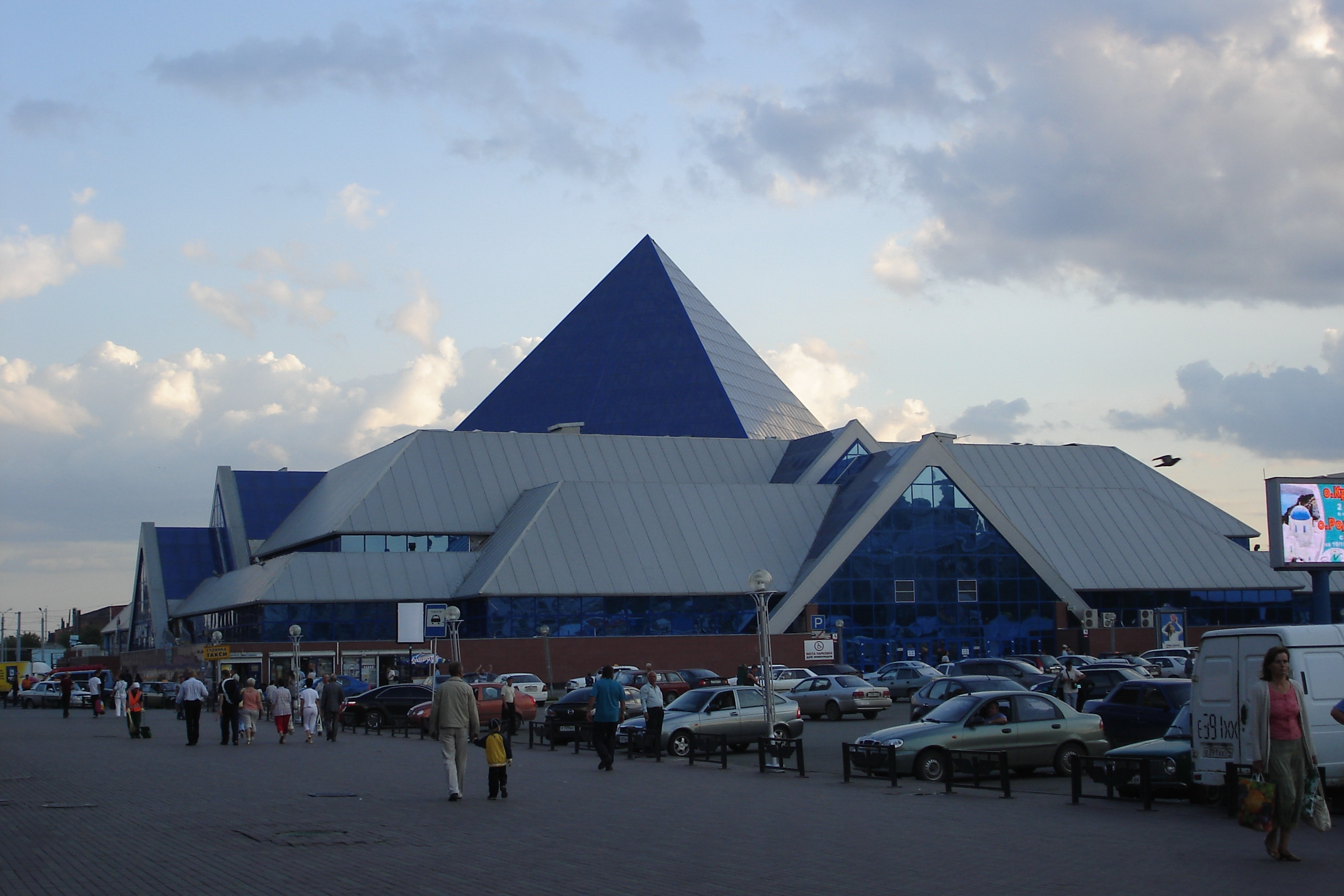
Sinegorye shopping mall

Following the dissolution of the Soviet Union, Chelyabinsk has had a significant role in other sectors of the Russian economy, hosting insurance firms, logistics centers, tourism, And important regional banking firms, such as Chelindbank and Chelyabinvestbank.

There are several large shopping malls. The largest of them are Gorky ('Hills'), built in 2007 with an area of 55,000 square metres (590,000 sq ft), and Rodnik ('Spring') built in 2011 with an area 135,000 square metres (1,450,000 sq ft)). At least two more are under construction: Almaz ('Diamond'), and Cloud, beginning construction in 2015 and 2018, with planned areas of 220,000 and 350,000 square metres (2,400,000 and 3,800,000 sq ft), respectively.

=== Transportation ===
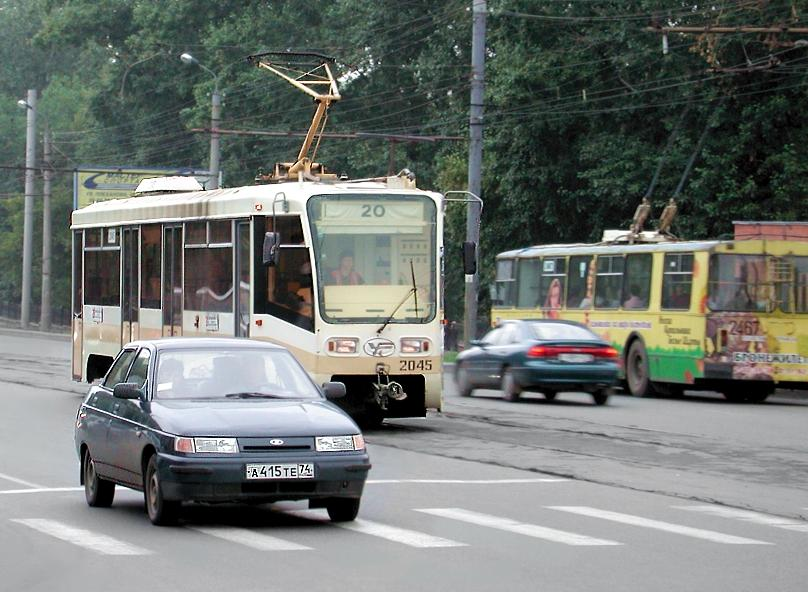
Tram and trolleybus in Chelyabinsk

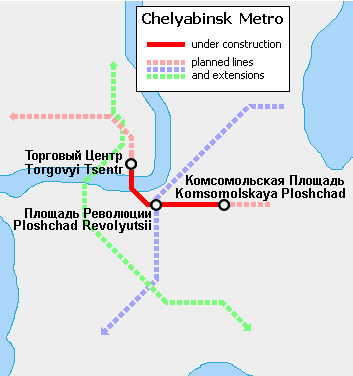
Planned metro network

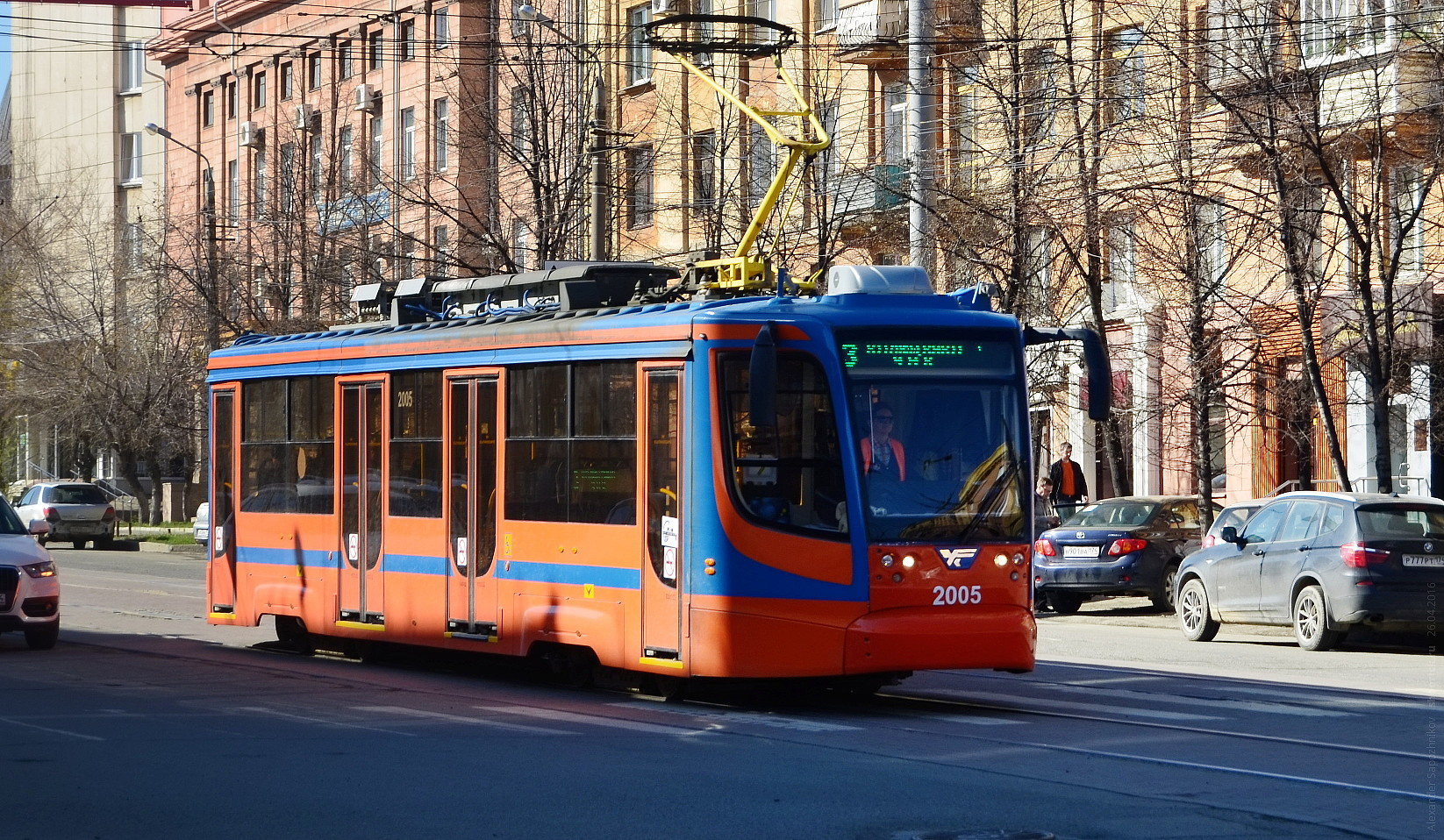
Chelyabinsk Trams

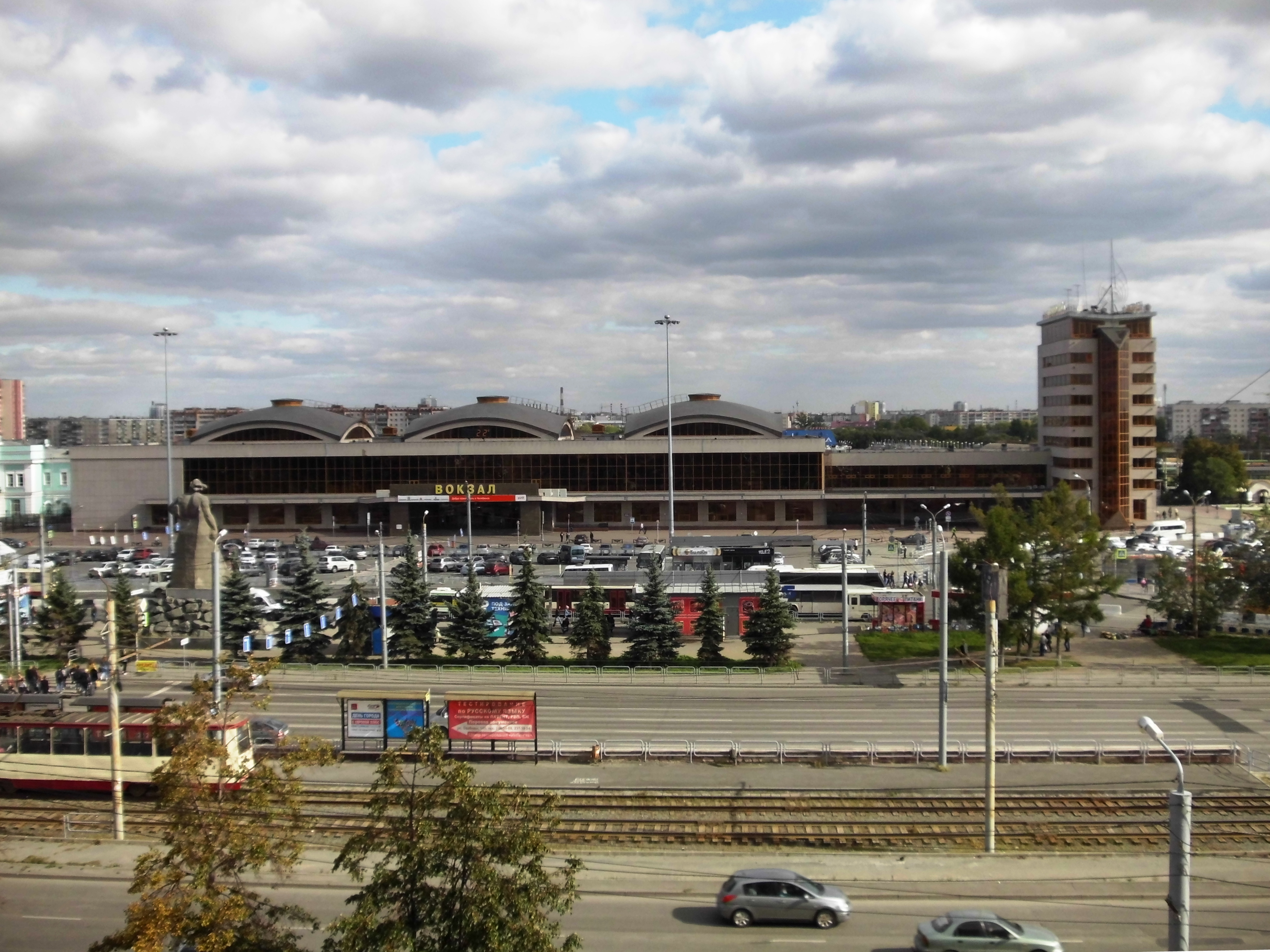
Chelyabinsk railway Station

Public transport in Chelyabinsk consists of bus (since 1925), tram (since 1932) and trolleybus (since 1942) networks, as well as private marshrutka (routed cab) services. The city has several taxi companies.

In 2014 in Chelyabinsk it began to run electric buses and trolleybuses fitted to run electrically.

In 2011 the telecommunications company Beeline and Chelyabinsk City Transport signed an agreement to provide passengers with free internet on some public trams and trolleybuses in Chelyabinsk.

Chelyabinsk started the construction of a three-line subway network in 1992, but it has never been finished, and part of the extant line is now in disrepair.

The city is served by the Chelyabinsk Airport.

== Sports ==
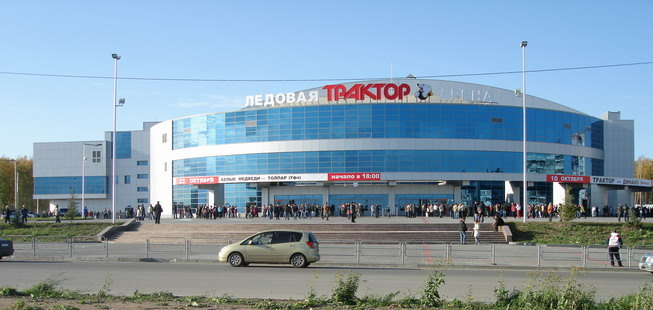
Traktor Arena

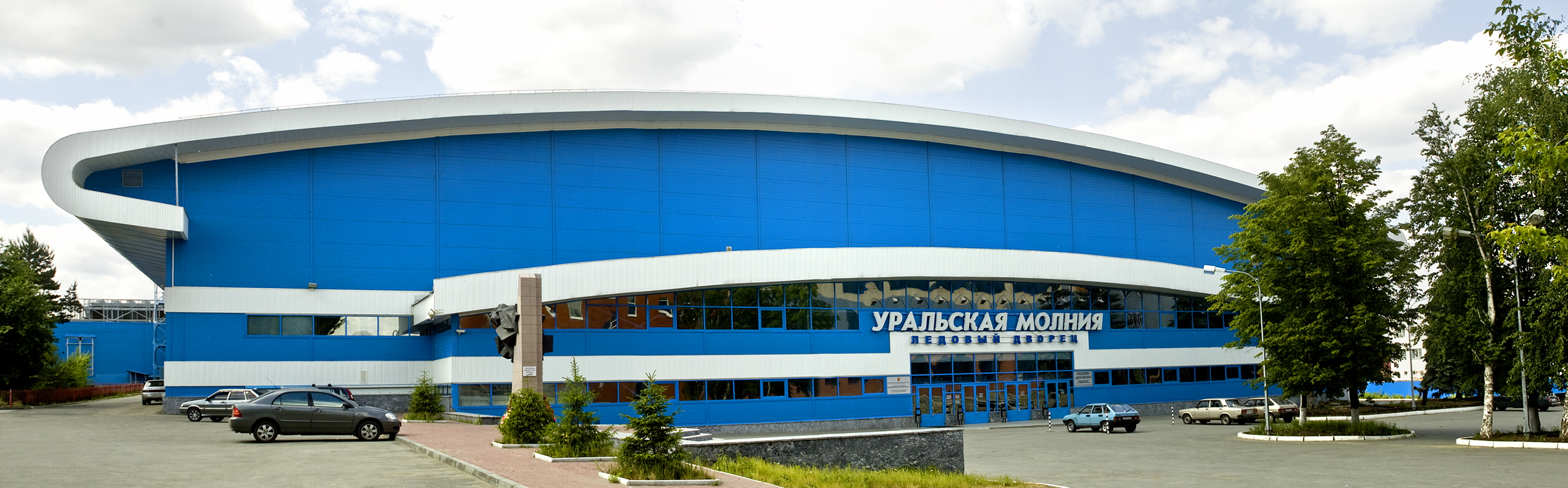
Uralskaya Molniya, one of the indoor speed skating arenas in Russia

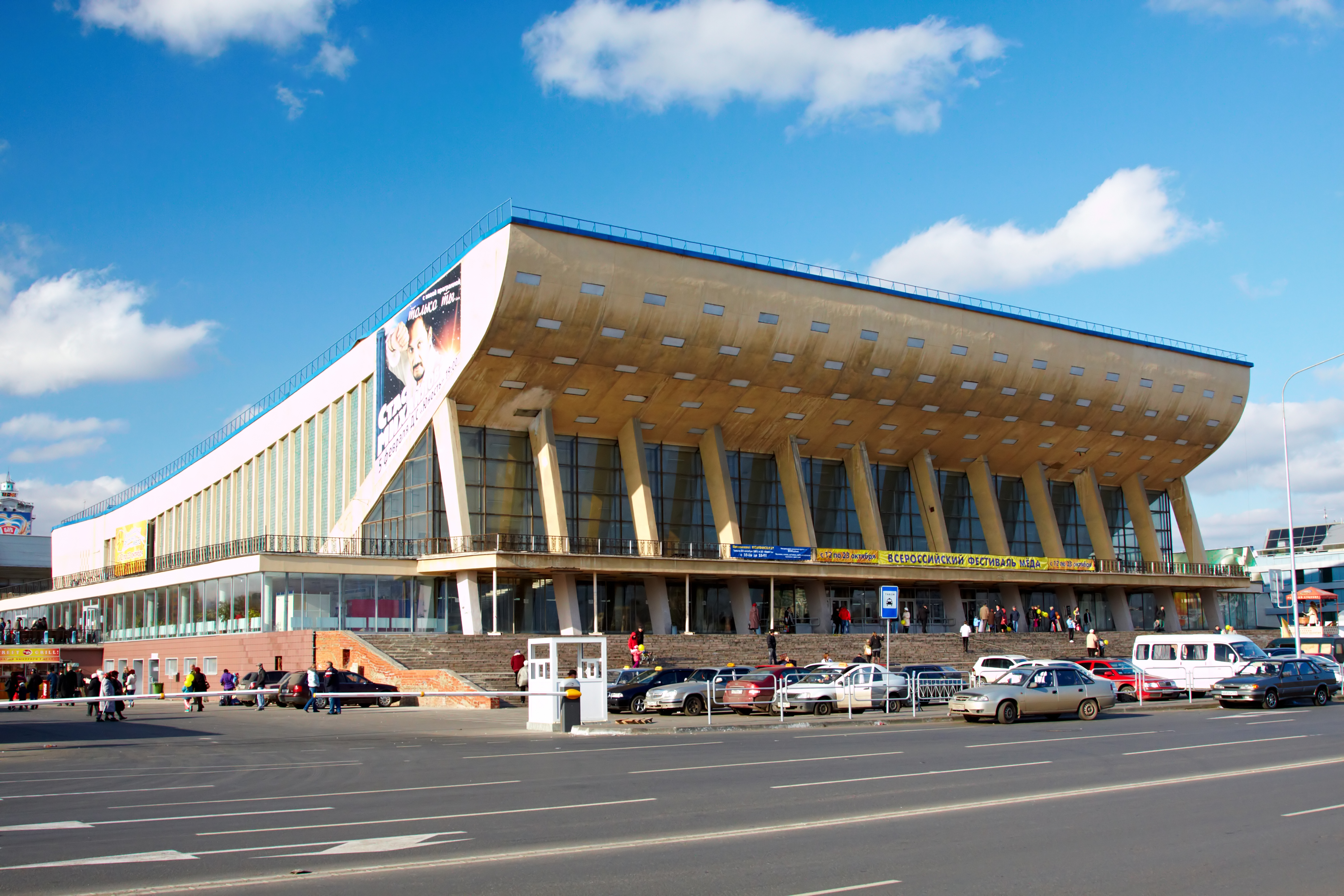
Yunost Sport Palace

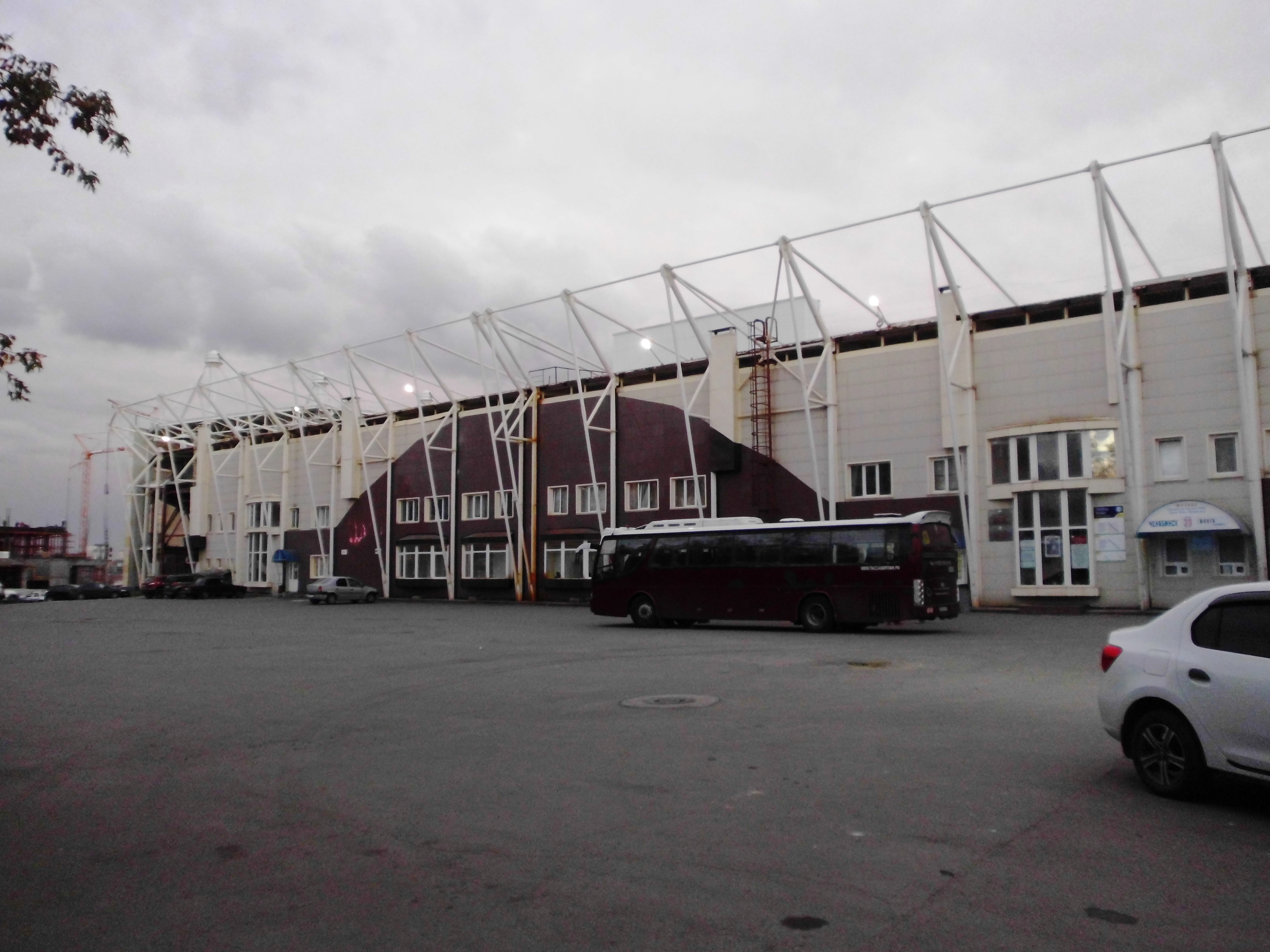
Central Stadium of Chelyabinsk

Several sports clubs are active in the city:

Club	Sport	Founded	Current league	League Rank	Stadium
Traktor Chelyabinsk	Ice Hockey	1947	Kontinental Hockey League	1st	Traktor Arena
Chelmet Chelyabinsk	Ice Hockey	1948	Higher Hockey League	2nd	Yunost Sports Palace
Belye Medvedi Chelyabinsk	Ice Hockey	2009	Junior Hockey League	Jr. 1st	Traktor Arena
FC Chelyabinsk	Football	1977	Russian Second Division	3rd	Central Stadium
Sintur Chelyabinsk	Futsal	1997	Futsal Supreme League	2nd	USURT Sports Complex
Dynamo-Metar Chelyabinsk	Volleyball	1972	Women's Volleyball Superleague	1st	Metar-Sport Sports Palace
Dynamo Chelyabinsk	Volleyball	1986	Men's Volleyball Supreme League	2nd	Metar-Sport Sports Palace

In recent history, Chelyabinsk has hosted several important sporting events, especially in martial arts. These events include the 2012 European Judo Championships, the 2014 World Judo Championships, and the 2015 World Taekwondo Championships. 2015 also saw Chelyabinsk host the European Speed Skating Championships. In 2018, Chelyabinsk and nearby Magnitogorsk hosted the IIHF World U18 Championship.

== Culture ==
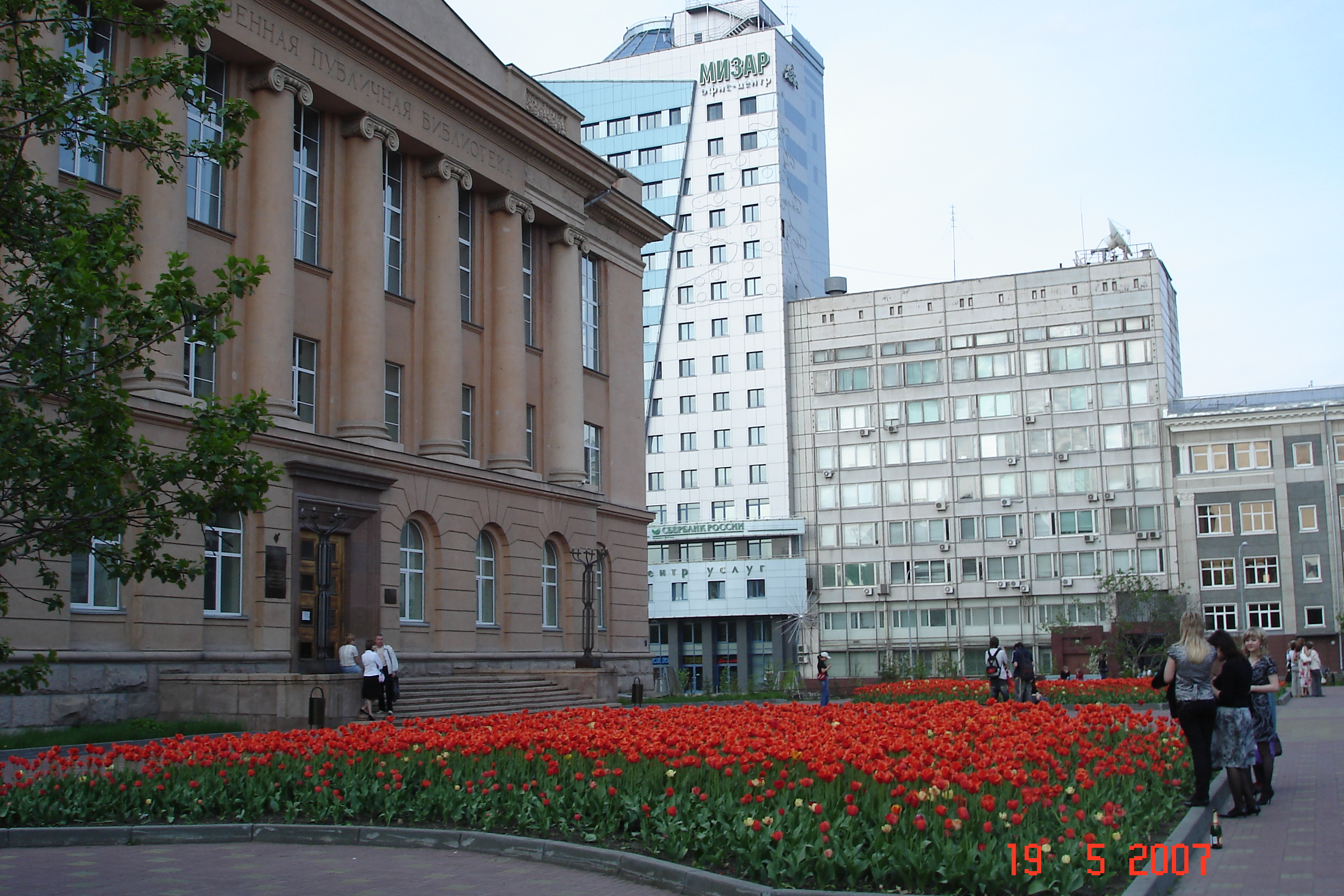
Chelyabinsk Regional Universal Scientific Library

The city has several libraries, notably Chelyabinsk Regional Universal Scientific Library, the largest public library in the Chelyabinsk Oblast. The library has more than 2 million books, over 12,000 of which are rare, originating from the 17th to 19th centuries.

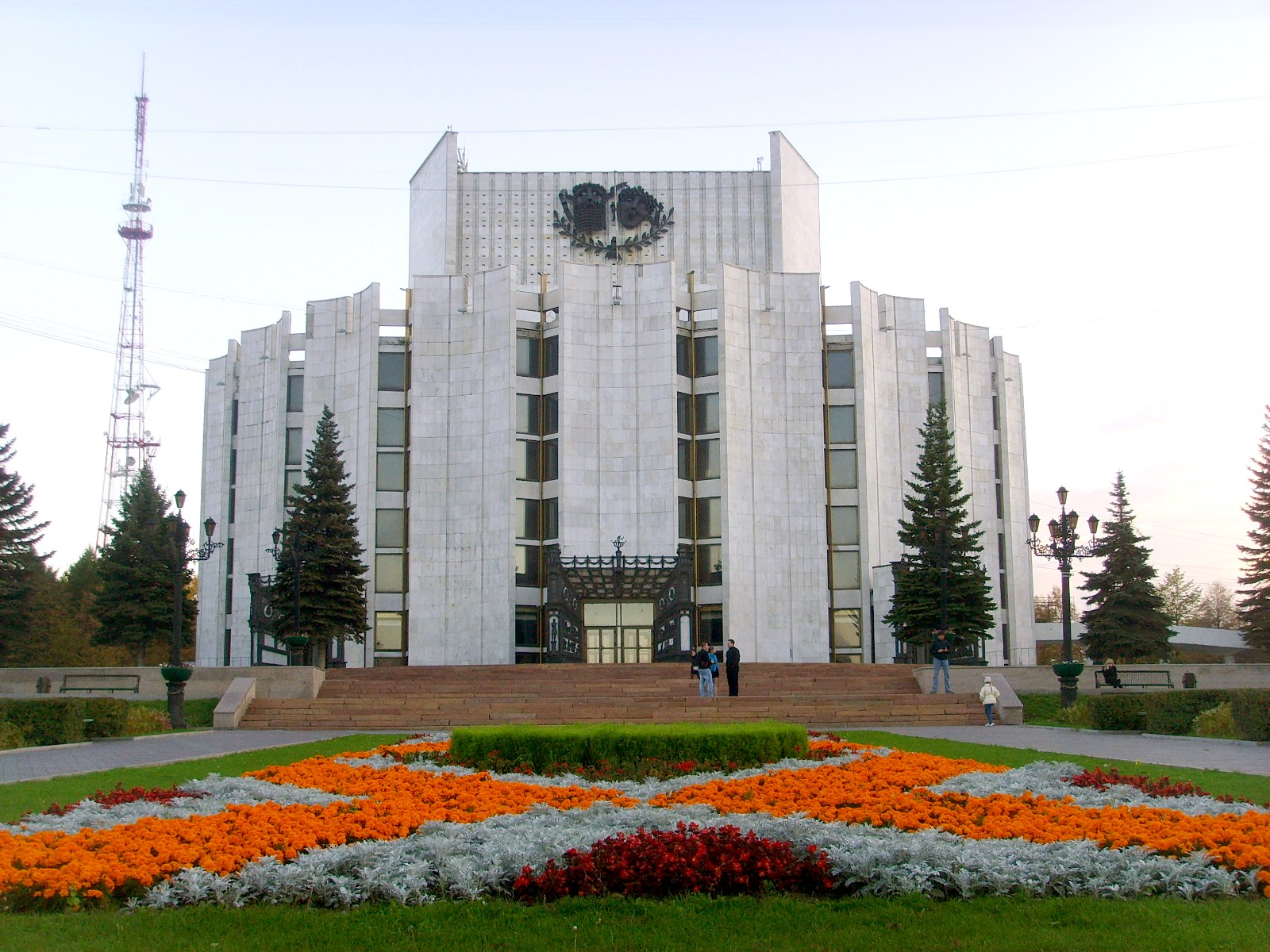
Nahum Orlov State Academic Drama Theater

Chelyabinsk is home to several theatres. The Chelyabinsk Opera and Ballet Theatre, also known as the Glinka State Academic Opera and Ballet Theatre, was built from 1936 to 1955 on the site of the former Nativity Cathedral, which existed from 1748 to 1932. The opening of the theatre eventually took place on 29 September 1956, with a production of Alexander Borodin's "Prince Igor". Others include the Nahum Orlov State Academic Drama Theatre, Chelyabinsk State Chamber Theater, Chelyabinsk State Puppet Theater, Chelyabinsk State Youth Theatre, Mannequin Theater, Chelyabinsk New Arts Theatre, and Chelyabinsk Contemporary Dance Theatre.

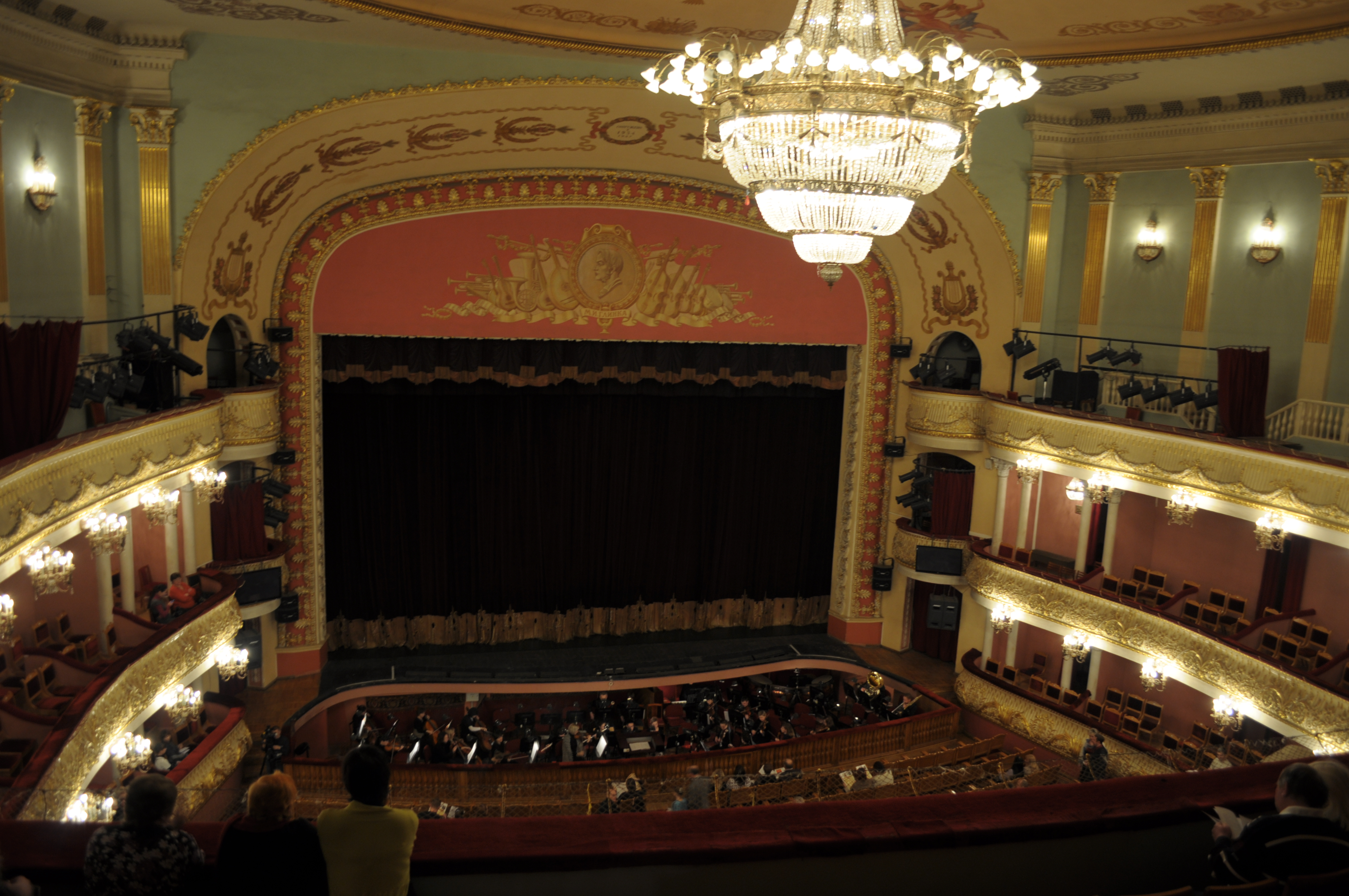
Concert Hall of the Glinka State Academic Opera and Ballet Theatre

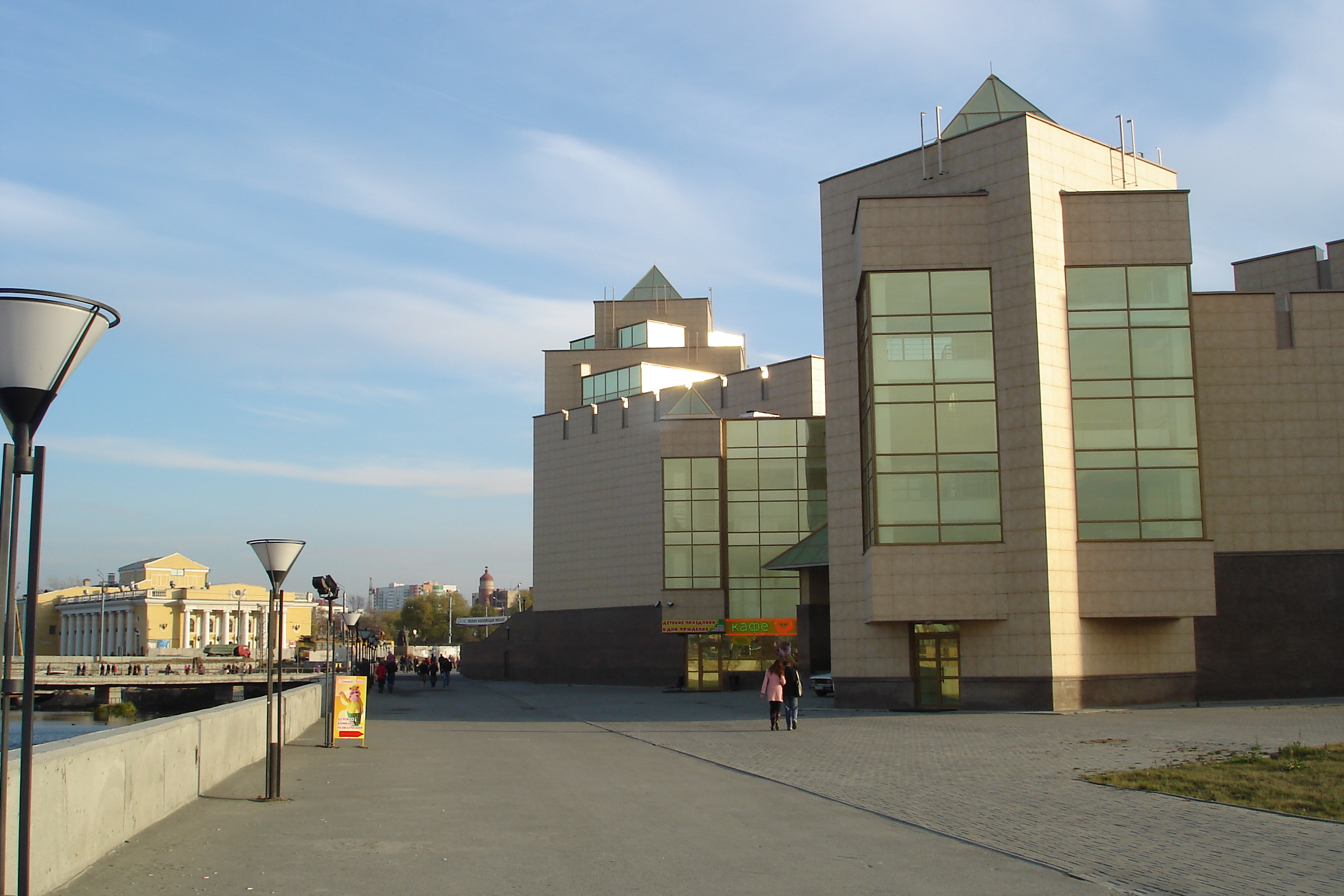
Chelyabinsk regional museum

There are nine museums in Chelyabinsk. Chelyabinsk Regional Museum was founded in 1913 and holds about 300,000 exhibits. Important expositions include the "Land of Cities" exhibit relating to the 2nd and 3rd millennium BCE settlement of Arkaim, the 570 kg (1,260 lb) largest fragment of the Chelyabinsk meteor, ornate 19th- and 20th-century blades made by Zlatoust arms factory, exhibits of Kasli artistic cast iron, and more.

Chelyabinsk Regional Picture Gallery has more than 11,000 works. The museum displays collections of Russian, European, and international works originating from the Middle Ages to modern times. The museum has significant collections of religious icons from the 16th to 20th centuries, along with early printed books and manuscripts.

The Museum of History of the Southern Ural Railway hosts more than 30 exhibits of equipment used on the railway after its opening in Chelyabinsk in 1892.

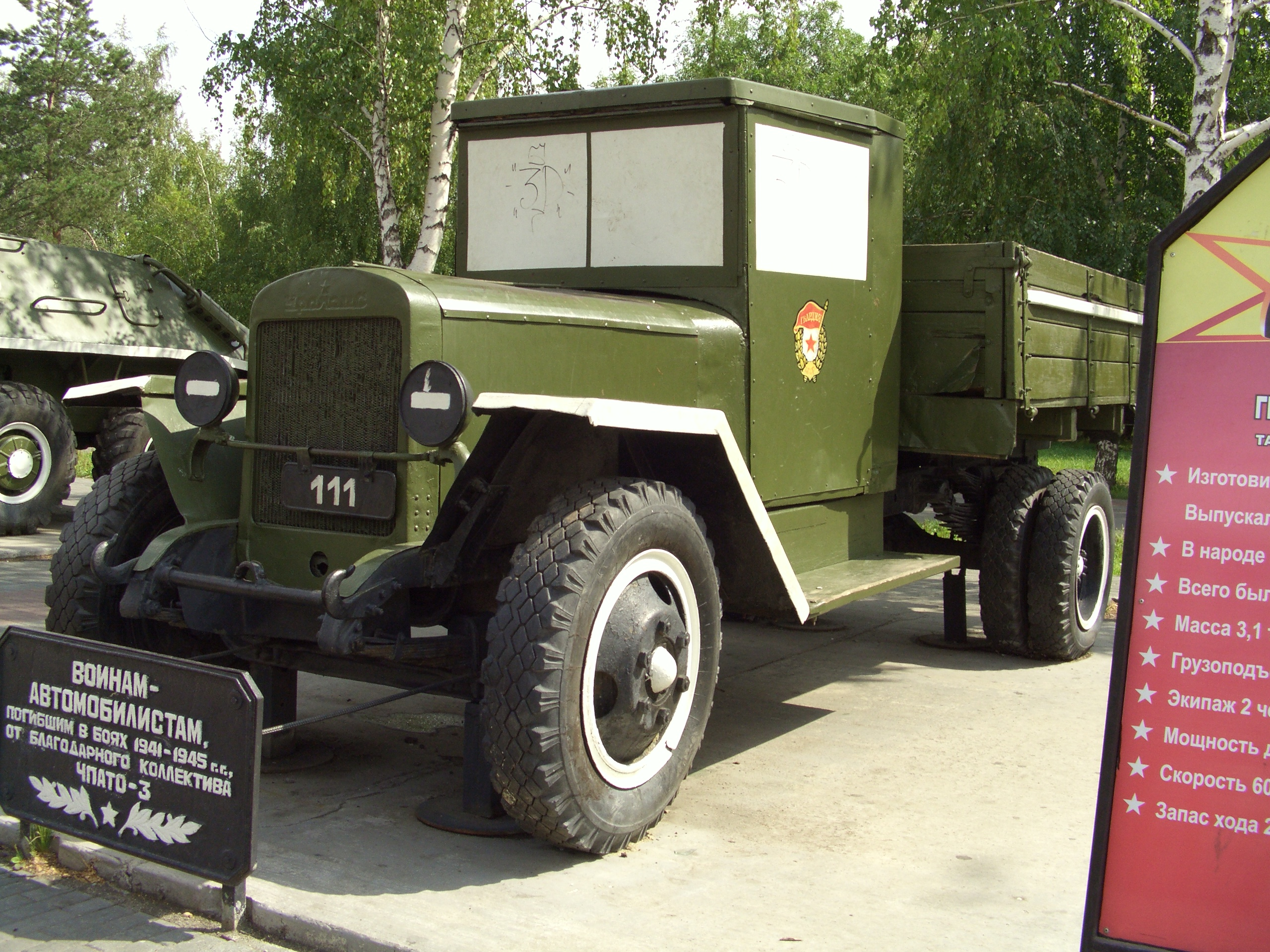
Museum of Military Equipment in the Garden of Victory

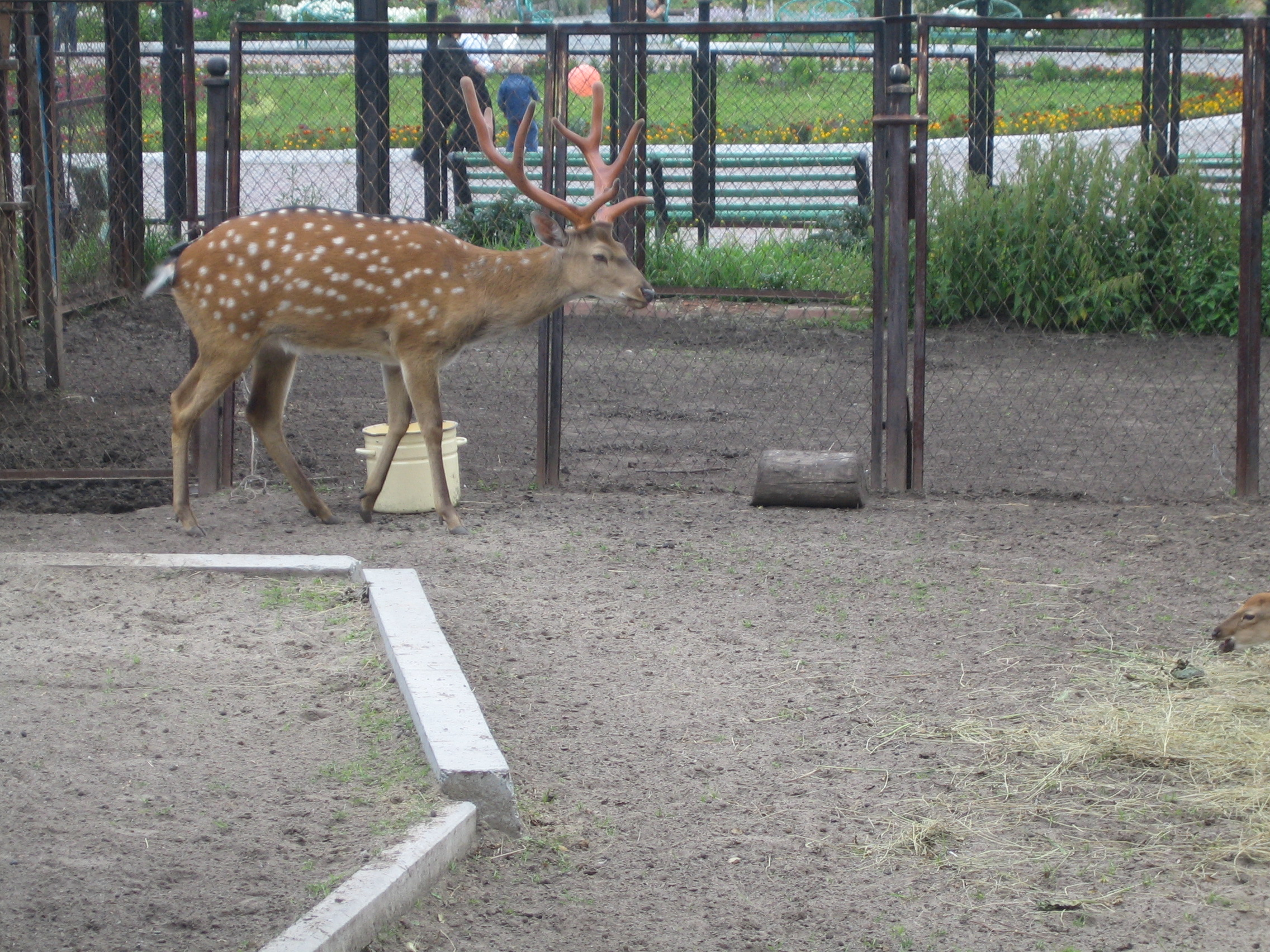
Sika deer in the Chelyabinsk Zoo

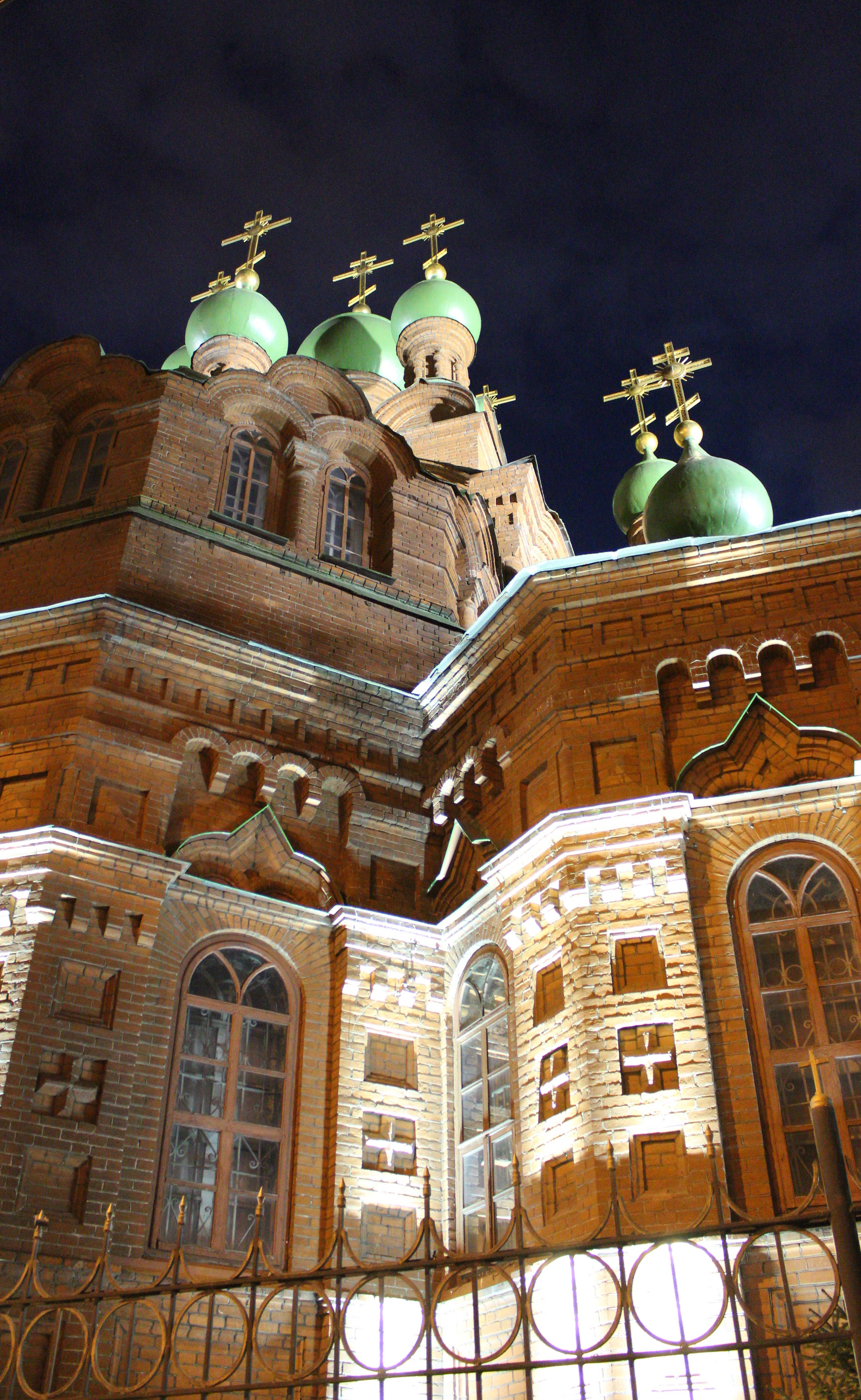
Holy Trinity Church (1914)

The Museum of Military Equipment in the Garden of Victory was founded in 2007. It has 16 exhibits, including models of T-34 and IS-3 tanks, along with Katyusha rocket launchers produced in Chelyabinsk during World War II.

In addition, the city is home to the Chelyabinsk Regional Geological Museum, the Malgobekskii Museum of Military and Labor Glory, the Chelyabinsk Postal Service Museum, and the Entertaining Sciences Museum Eksperimentus.

Chelyabinsk Zoo is located in the central region of Chelyabinsk. It has an area of 30 hectares (75 acres) with more than 110 species of animals, of which more than 80 are listed in the Red Data Book of the Russian Federation. The zoo participates in international programs for the conservation of endangered species, including amur (siberian) tigers, far eastern leopards and polar bears. The zoo holds regular sightseeing tours, lectures, exhibitions and celebrations.

Other cultural attractions include the Chelyabinsk State Circus, the Chelyabinsk State Philharmonic Concert Hall named after Sergei Prokofiev, and Organ and Chamber Music Hall Rodina.

Chelyabinsk is home to several churches built from the 19th to 21st

== Popular culture ==
Chelyabinsk makes an appearance in Family Guy as Season 21, Episode 19, "From Russia with Love" aired on April 30, 2023. The episode's storyline focuses on Brian, Stewie, and Meg traveling to Chelyabinsk to meet a hacker hijacking Brian's social media accounts. The characterization of Chelyabinsk is somewhat exaggerated through stereotypes—it's a terrible, radiation-infused city with men in track suits and women in fur coats, all partaking in copious amounts of vodka. However, it's important to note that Stewie is very excited that they're going to the Kuznetsov Tea Factory and even calls Chelyabinsk the "Chicago of the Urals." According to the response to the episode by Deputy Yana Lantratova of the State Duma, she reprimanded Family Guy for promoting a "deliberately offensive artistic image" of Chelyabinsk.

A brief reference to Chelyabinsk also appears in the episode "Spies Reminiscent of Us" (season 8, episode 3), which involves a subplot where characters uncover and follow Russian spies. While the storyline includes a trip to Russia, direct references to Chelyabinsk are limited.

== Notable people ==
- Roman Abalin (born 1998), Chelyabinsk-born YouTuber, left Russia in 2022.
- Ariel, Soviet pop rock band
- Lera Auerbach (born 1973), composer and musician, born and grew up in Chelyabinsk
- Svyatoslav Belza (1942–2014), musical scholar, critic and essayist, born in Chelyabinsk
- Anatoliy Kroll (born 1943), jazz musician, bandleader, composer, born and started his career in Chelyabinsk
- Zhan Bush (born 1993), figure skater
- Dmitry Shishkin born in 1992 Classical Pianist
- Yekaterina Gamova (born 1980), Olympic volleyball player, born and grew up in Chelyabinsk
- Makhmut Gareev (1923–2019), historian and military scientist, born and grew up in Chelyabinsk
- Sidney Gordin (1918–1996), artist, professor
- Viktor Khristenko (born 1957), politician and statesman born and grew up in Chelyabinsk
- Igor Kurnosov (1985–2013), chess grandmaster, born in Chelyabinsk
- Oleg Mityaev (born 1956), singer-songwriter and actor, born, grew up, and came into prominence in Chelyabinsk
- Vadim Muntagirov (born 1990), ballet dancer, born in Chelyabinsk
- Staņislavs Olijars (born 1979), Latvian 110m hurdler, gold medallist at the 2006 European Athletics Championships, born in Chelyabinsk
- Georgy Ratner (1923–2001), surgeon, born in Chelyabinsk
- Nelli Rokita (born 1957), Polish politician, born in Chelyabinsk
- Eugene Roshal (born 1972), software developer, born in Chelyabinsk
- Boris Ryzhy (1974–2001), Russian poet and geologist
- Mariya Savinova (born 1985), Olympic athlete, born in Chelyabinsk
- Galina Starovoytova (1946–1998), politician and human rights activist, born in Chelyabinsk
- Maksim Surayev (born 1972), cosmonaut, born in Chelyabinsk
- Evgeny Sveshnikov (born 1950), chess grandmaster and writer, born and grew up in Chelyabinsk
- Anna Trebunskaya (born 1980), ballroom and Latin dancer, born in Chelyabinsk
- Ivan Ukhov (born 1986), Olympic high jumper, born in Chelyabinsk
- Mikhail Yurevich (born 1969), businessman, politician, born in Chelyabinsk
- Mikhail Koklyaev (born 1978), Russian strongman competitor

=== Ice hockey players ===
- Sergei Babinov (born 1955), Soviet player, Canada Cup champion
- Sergei Starikov (born 1958), Soviet Olympian and NHL player
- Vyacheslav Bykov (born 1960), Soviet player
- Stanislav Chistov (born 1983), NHL and KHL player
- Evgeny Davydov (born 1967), NHL player, USSR champion
- Radmir Faizov (born 1977), Russian Superleague player, Russian team at the World Junior championships
- Sergei Gonchar (born 1974), NHL player, Stanley Cup champion
- Dmitri Kalinin (born 1980), NHL and KHL player, Gagarin Cup champion
- Alexandra Vafina (born 1990), Russian Olympic ice hockey player (2010, 2014)
- Evgeny Kuznetsov (born 1992), NHL and KHL player, Stanley Cup champion
- Sergei Makarov (born 1958), NHL player
- Andrei Nazarov (born 1974), NHL player and KHL coach
- Nikita Nesterov (born 1993), NHL and KHL player
- Valeri Nichushkin (born 1995), NHL and KHL player, Stanley Cup champion
- Valeri Karpov (1971–2014), Russian Superleague and NHL player
- Maxim Shabanov (born 2000), NHL and KHL player
- Dmitri Tertyshny (1976–1999), Russian Superleague and NHL player
- Slava Voynov (born 1990), NHL player, Stanley Cup champion
- Danil Yerdakov (born 1989), KHL player
- Danis Zaripov (born 1981), KHL player, Gagarin Cup champion
- Yakov Trenin (born 1997), NHL player
- Danila Yurov (born 2003), NHL player

== International relations ==
=== Twin towns – sister cities ===
Chelyabinsk is twinned with:

- Nottinghamshire, United Kingdom
- Ramla, Israel
- Ürümqi, China
- Columbia, South Carolina, United States

=== Diplomatic and consular missions and visa centers ===
- Italy: Honorary Consulate, Visa center

== See also ==
- Chelyabinsk Trade Center
