= NFKRZ =

Russian YouTuber (born 1998)

- Born: 24 January 1998 (age 28); Chelyabinsk, Russia
- Occupation: YouTuber

YouTube information
- Channel: roman_nfkrz
- Years active: 2010-present
- Genres: Vlog; commentary
- Subscribers: 1.26 million
- Views: 310.5 million
- Last updated: 07 August 2026

Roman Albertovich Abalin (Russian: Роман Альбертович Абалин, born 24 January 1998), better known by his screen name NFKRZ (pronounced "No fuckers"), is a Russian YouTuber who is known for his commentary on topics such as food, vlogs, and Russian politics among others. As a dissident and outspoken critic of Russian politics, he is sometimes compared to Russian opposition leader Alexei Navalny.

Following the Russian invasion of Ukraine, Abalin left Russia, and moved to Tbilisi, Georgia in March 2022. Two years later, in March 2024, he received a Portuguese visa and settled in Lisbon. After a year-long wait and a lengthy legal process, Abalin announced in March 2025 that he had finally received a Portuguese Residence Permit, and had therefore become a resident of the European Union.

Abalin is also a musician, releasing self-penned lo-fi hip-hop music on SoundCloud under the pseudonym romaskosmodroma.
