= Danil Yerdakov =

Russian ice hockey player

- Born: 4 June 1989 (age 35); Chelyabinsk, Russia
- Height: 6 ft 2 in (188 cm)
- Weight: 202 lb (92 kg; 14 st 6 lb)
- Position: Forward
- Shoots: Left
- VHL team Former teams: Metallurg Novokuznetsk; HC Spartak Moscow
- Playing career: 2010–present

Danil Yerdakov (born 4 June 1989) is a Russian professional ice hockey player. He is currently with Metallurg Novokuznetsk of the Supreme Hockey League (VHL).

Yerdakov made his Kontinental Hockey League (KHL) debut playing with HC Spartak Moscow during the 2012–13 KHL season.
