= Chelyabinsk Trade Center =

Building in Chelyabinsk, Russia

Coordinates: 55°10′23.16″N 61°23′33.16″E

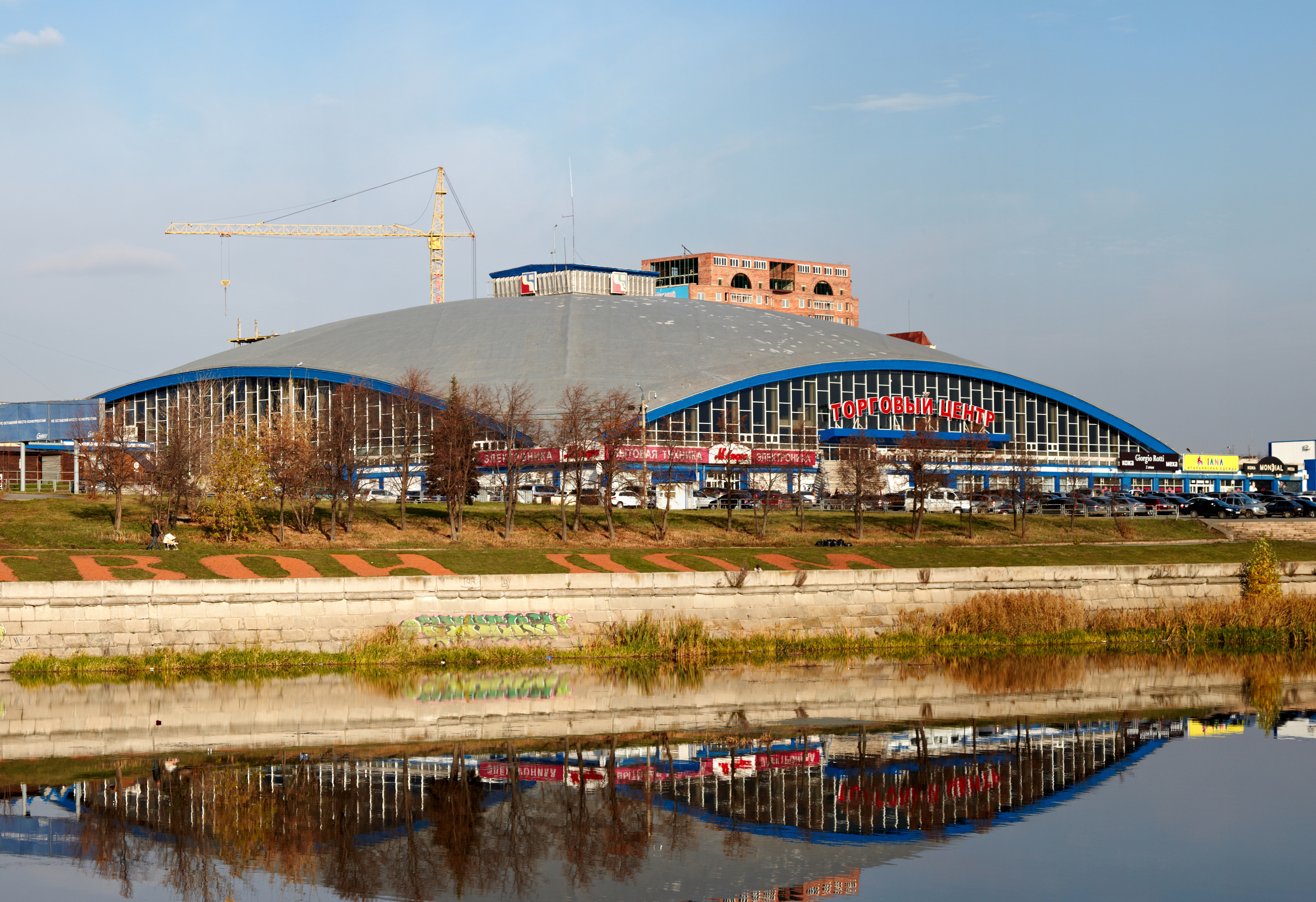

Chelyabinsk Trade Center (Russian: Челябинский Торговый центр) is a building on the embankment of the Miass River in Chelyabinsk, Russia, built in 1975. The Trade Center silhouette became one of the symbols of the city.

The main square building (side size is 102 meters) is covered by the dome, which is supported only by the columns on its edges. The dome itself is made of 1500 reinforced concrete shells, tightened together with metal cables. Total weight of the dome is above 5000 tons. Dome edge piers can move, allowing the whole construction to "breathe" (expand or contract) depending on the outside temperature (temperature in Chelyabinsk can be as low as –40 °C in winter and +40 °C in summer). The design of the Trade Center (developed by Leningrad Project Institute Number One) received positive reviews during exhibitions in Moscow, London and New York in 1974–1978.

Today there are several mid-size retail outlets in the Trade Center (selling food, electronic devices), with the large portion of the space occupied by small outlets (clothes, DIY, home appliances and others). Total retail and warehouse area is 18000 m^{2}.

The metro station with the same name is being built near the Trade Center.

== See also ==
- Thin-shell structure
