= Chelyabinsk Forge-and-Press Plant =

Vehicle and component manufacturer in Chelyabinsk, Russia

- Company type: Open joint-stock company
- Traded as: MCX: CHKZ
- Founded: 1942
- Headquarters: Chelyabinsk, Russia
- Revenue: $98.1 million (2016)
- Operating income: $2.85 million (2016)
- Net income: $2.15 million (2016)
- Website: www.eng.chkpz.ru

OAO Chelyabinsk Forge-and-Press Plant (Russian: Челябинский Кузнечно-прессовый завод, lit. 'Chelyabinsk Forge-and-Press Plant', abbreviated as OAO ChKPZ) is a machine building and automobile component manufacturing company based in Chelyabinsk, Russia.

== Overview ==
The company's main products are special purpose vehicles such as dumpers, short loggers, timber trucks, pipe trucks and bolsters, as well as wheels for cars, trucks, trolleybuses, trailers and semi-trailers and for heavy hauler and road construction machinery. In addition, the company produces forgings and presses used in manufacture of pipeline armature, cars and trucks, special-purpose equipment, vehicles, railway transport.

Most of the Chelyabinsk Forge-and-Press Plant's products are sold in Russia and in the former republics of the USSR, as well as in countries of Europe, Africa, and Asia.

The company's stock is listed on the Russian Trading System, and it currently has about 3,000 employees. It has two associated companies – Garmoniya OOO and Uraldormash ZAO.

The American magazine Business Week praised the company in its article published on 7 May 2009, describing it as a showcase of efficiency. The magazine especially praised the abilities of the company's 26-year-old CEO Andrey Gartung.
