= Georgy Ratner =

Soviet and Russian surgeon (1923–2001)

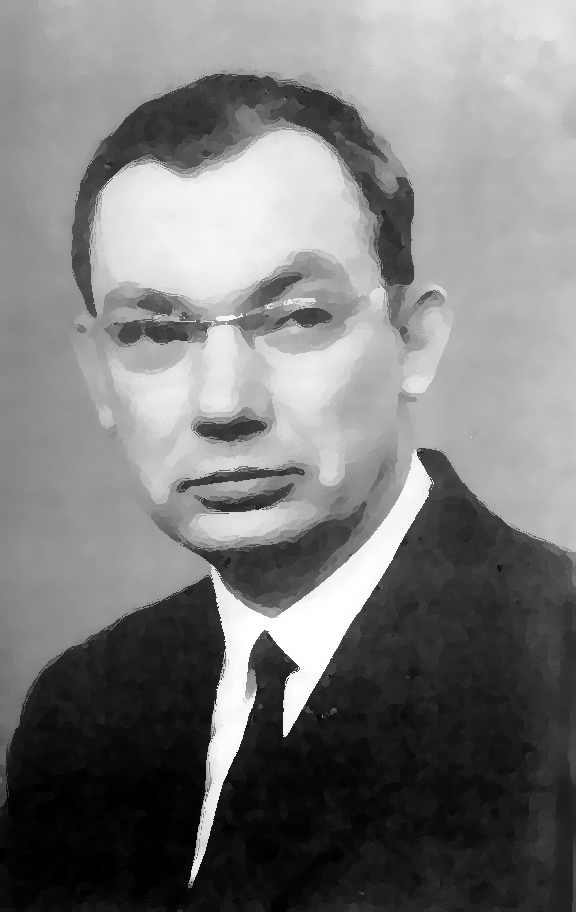
- Born: September 1, 1923; Sverdlovsk, Soviet Union
- Died: November 3, 2001 (aged 78); Samara, Russia
- Education: Sverdlovsk High Medical School
- Awards: Honored Scientist of Russia, Academician of Russian Medical Technique Academy, Honored Citizen of Samara City
- Scientific career
- Fields: Vascular surgery, heart surgery, thoracic surgery, general surgery
- Workplaces: Samara State Medical University
- Academic advisors: Arcady T. Lidsky

Georgy L. Ratner (1923–2001) was a Soviet and Russian surgeon, head of surgery at Samara State Medical University, and the founder of a school of vascular and heart surgeons in Russia.
