= The Last Confession (TV series) =

- Based on: The Young Guard by Alexander Fadeyev
- Written by: Yuri Avetikov; Yevgeny Kotov
- Directed by: Sergei Lyalin
- Starring: Ivan Vikulov; Anastasia Panina; Eldar Lebedev
- Music by: Vladimir Dashkevich
- Country of origin: Russia
- Original language: Russian

Production
- Producer: Margarita Butz
- Cinematography: Sergey Zubikov
- Running time: 208 min.
- Production company: Profile Prestige

Original release
- Network: Channel One Russia
- Release: 2006 – 2006

The Last Confession (Russian: Последняя исповедь, romanized: Poslednyaya ispoved') is a 2006 Russian four-part TV series directed by Sergei Lyalin. Dedicated to the activities of the legendary underground anti-fascist Komsomol organization Young Guard, which operated during the Great Patriotic War in the occupied of Krasnodon in Ukrainian SSR.

== Cast ==
- Ivan Vikulov as Oleg Koshevoy
- Anastasia Panina as Lyubov Shevtsova
- Eldar Lebedev sa Sergei Tyulenin
- Valeria Kalennikova as Ulyana Gromova
- Timur Oragvelidze as Zhora Harutyunyants
- Lyudmila Kolesnikova as Valya Borts
- Eva Aveeva as Nina Ivantsova
- Yekaterina Vinogradova as Olya Ivantsova
- Vladimir Korenev as general of the Wehrmacht
- Yuriy Nazarov as Chizhov
- Svetlana Ivanova as Nadezhda Tyulenina
- Valentina Ananina as old woman Marusya
- Anatoliy Kotenyov as Rykin

== Awards ==
2007 — first place in the competition of television films of the II International Film Festival of Family and Children's Films «A faithful heart» (Moscow) — «For the vivid embodiment of the military-patriotic theme».
