= Young Guard =

Young Guard may refer to:

- Young Guard (Napoleonic), French elite military units during the time of Napoleon Bonaparte
- Young Guard, associated with Soviet Union and Russia:
  - Molodaya Gvardiya (magazine), a monthly literary magazine published since 1922
  - Molodaya Gvardiya (publisher), a publishing house in the Soviet Union and Russia, established in 1922
  - Young Guard (Soviet resistance), a Soviet resistance organisation during World War II, composed mainly of teenagers
    - The Young Guard (novel), a 1945 (rev. 1951) novel by Alexander Fadeyev about the Soviet resistance organisation
      - The Young Guard (opera), a 1947 opera by Yuliy Meitus, based on Fadeyev's novel
      - The Young Guard (film), a 1948 Soviet film directed by Sergei Gerasimov, based on Fadeyev's novel
  - Young Guard of United Russia, a pro-Kremlin 'direction action' youth organization, youth wing of United Russia
- Young Guard (ice hockey team), a junior ice hockey team based in Donetsk, Ukraine
- "Young Guard" (Die Erste Wache!), a 1909 musical score for piano by Harry Appel
- Young Guard (Brazilian movement)
- Hashomer Hatzair ("The Young Guard" in Hebrew), a left-wing Zionist youth movement
