= Dmytro Smolych =

Soviet-Ukrainian theatrical director (1919–1987)

- Дмитро Смолич
- Born: April 11, 1919; Petrograd, Russian SSR
- Died: April 28, 1987 (aged 68); Kyiv, Ukraine SSR
- Occupation: Theatre director

Dmytro Mykolayovych Smolych (Ukrainian: Смолич Дмитро Миколайович; Russian: Дми́трий Никола́евич Смо́лич) (11 April 1919 – 28 April 1987) was a Soviet and Ukrainian theatre director.

== Early years ==
Smolych was born in Petrograd (now Saint Petersburg), in the Russian Soviet Federative Socialist Republic. He was the son of the theatre director Mykola Smolych. In 1941, he graduated from the K. Stanislavsky Opera and Drama Studio in Moscow.

== Career and notable productions ==
From 1941–1955, he directed the National Opera of Ukraine (becoming its chief director in 1970). He directed the Chelyabinsk Opera and Ballet Theatre from 1955–1958, when he became the chief director of the Odesa Opera and Ballet Theatre. In 1962 he became art director of the Minsk Theatre, a post he held for seven years. In 1969 he became chief director at the Lviv Theatre of Opera and Ballet, holding the post for a year. From 1970 he was the chief director of the Ukrainian Opera and Ballet Theatre.

Smolych's notable productions of operas include Taras Bulba by M. Lysenko, Yaroslav the Wise by H. Maiboroda, Macbeth by J. Verdi, Boris Godunov by M. Mussorgsky, Prince Igor by O. Borodin, The Queen of Spades by P. Tchaikovsky, In the Storm by T. Hryennikov, Absalom and Eteri by Paliashvili, and Huguenots by Meyerbeer, as well as Carmen by Georges Bizet (1947), Halka by Stanisław Moniuszko (1949), Bohdan Khmelnytskyi (1954) and Nazar Stodoly (1961) by Kostiantyn Dankevych, The Young Guard by Yuliy Meitus (1955), In the Steppes of Ukraine by Oscar Sandler (1962), and Don Carlos by Verdi (1970).

== Later life ==
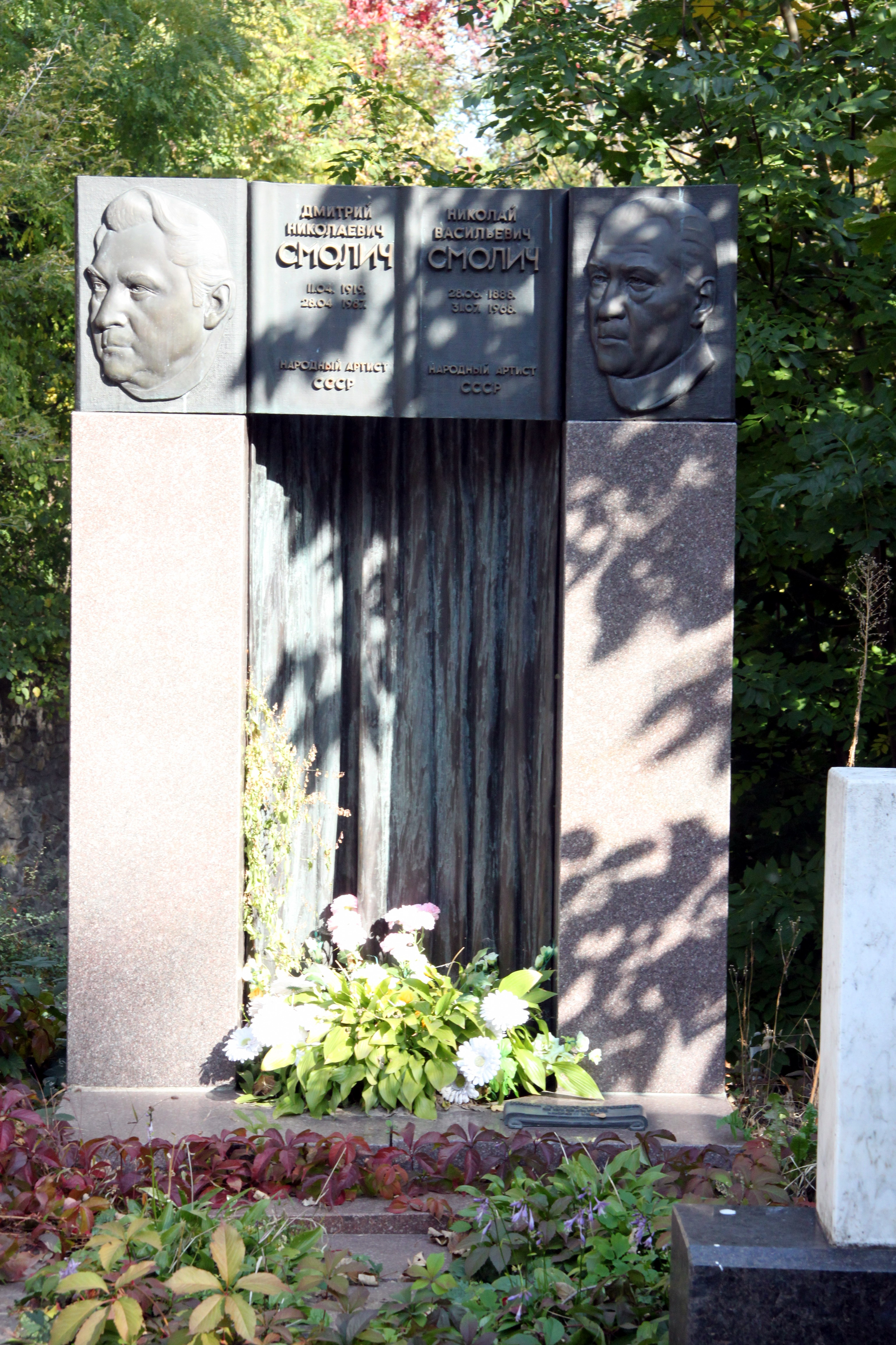
Grave of Dmytro and Mykola Smolych, Baikove Cemetery

Smolych spent much of his later life in Kyiv, and there is a bronze memorial plaque dedicated to him at 39 Bohdan Khmelnytskyi Street, where he lived and worked from 1971 to 1987. He died in Kyiv on April 28, 1987. He is buried next to his father in Baikove Cemetery.

== Honours ==
He was an Honoured Artist of the Georgian SSR (1957), Honored Artist of the RSFSR (1958). People's Artist of the Ukrainian SSR (1960), People's Artist of the BRSR (1964), Laureate of the Taras Shevchenko State Prize of the Ukrainian SSR (1970), and People's Artist of the USSR (1979).
