= The Young Guard (film) =

- Film poster
- Directed by: Sergei Gerasimov
- Written by: Sergei Gerasimov; Alexander Fadeyev (novel)
- Starring: Vladimir Ivanov; Inna Makarova; Nonna Mordyukova; Sergei Gurzo; Lyudmila Shagalova; Viktor Khokhryakov
- Cinematography: Vladimir Rapoport
- Music by: Dmitri Shostakovich
- Production company: Gorky Film Studio
- Release date: 11 November 1948
- Running time: 170 minutes
- Country: Soviet Union
- Language: Russian

The Young Guard (Russian: Молодая гвардия, romanized: Molodaya Gvardiya) is a two-part 1948 Soviet film directed by Sergei Gerasimov and based on the 1946 novel of the same title by Alexander Fadeyev. In 1949 a Stalin Prize for this film was awarded to Gerasimov, cinematographer Vladimir Rapoport, and the leading actors.

The film was the highest grossing Soviet film of 1948, with approximately 48,600,000 tickets sold.

== Synopsis ==
The film is set in July 1942 during The Great Patriotic War. Part of the Red Army leaves the mining town Krasnodon. After that, the city gets occupied by the German troops. Enemy machines destroy their path and members of the Komsomol group are forced to return home. In response to the atrocities of the invaders, the young Komsomol members, who are former students, create an underground anti-fascist Komsomol organization Young Guard. This organization leads a covert war against the occupation forces; young men spread antifascist leaflets, free a group of Red Army prisoners, burn the German stock exchange, thus saving their countrymen from being sent to work in Germany. On the day of the Red October anniversary, the young guards hang red Soviet flags.

== Cast ==
- Vladimir Ivanov (actor) as Oleg Koshevoy
- Inna Makarova as Lyubov Shevtsova
- Nonna Mordyukova as Uliana Gromova
- Sergei Gurzo as Sergei Tyulenin
- Lyudmila Shagalova as Valeriya Borts
- Viktor Khokhryakov as Commander Protzenko
- Viktor Avdyushko as worker
- Aleksandr Antonov as Ignat Fomin, Hilfspolizei
- Yevgeny Morgunov as Evgeny Stakhovich
- Sergey Bondarchuk as Andrey Valko
- Muza Krepkogorskaya as Lazarenko
