= Inessa =

Inessa may refer to:

- Aetna (city) or Inessa, an ancient city of Sicily
- Inessa (skipper), a genus of skipper butterfly

== People ==
- Inessa Armand (1874–1920), French communist politician and feminist
- Inessa Galante (born 1954), Latvian soprano opera singer
- Inessa Korkmaz (born 1972), Russian volleyball player
- Inessa Konstantinova (1924–1944), Soviet wartime diarist and partisan
- Inessa Kravets (born 1966), Ukrainian triple jumper and long jumper
- Inessa Lee, American pop singer-songwriter
- Inessa Tarverdieva
