= The Young Guard (opera) =

Ukrainian opera written in 1947

- Opera by Yuliy Meitus
- A scene from an early production of The Young Guard illustrated in the Great Soviet Encyclopedia
- Librettist: Andriy Malyshko
- Language: Ukrainian
- Based on: The Young Guard by Alexander Fadeyev
- Premiere: 7 November 1947; T. G. Shevchenko Opera and Ballet Theatre, Kyiv

The Young Guard (Ukrainian: «Молода гвардiя», romanized: Moloda Hvardia) is an opera in four acts and seven scenes by the Ukrainian composer Yuliy Meitus, with a libretto by Andriy Malyshko.

The opera deals with the fate of the youth resistance group The Young Guard in Krasnodon, Ukraine, during the Second World War. The libretto was based on the novel of the same name by the Russian author Alexander Fadeyev. The original version of the opera premiered in Kyiv in 1947, and a reworked version was performed for the first time in Stalin (now Donetsk, Ukraine) in 1950.

== Origin and history ==
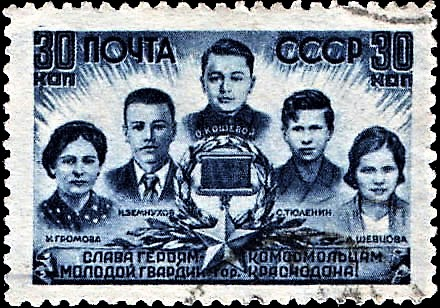
1944 Soviet Union postage stamp depicting a group of the Young Guards of Krasnodon, Ukrainian SSR

Immediately after the Second World War, there was a demand in the Soviet Union for operas about the war that celebrated its heroism in the conflict against Nazi Germany. In Ukraine, the first works of this type were The Honour of Herman Zhukovsky, The Only Life of Dmytr Klebanov and Oscar Sandler, which are considered by musicologists to be artistic failures.

Yuliy Meitus chose one of the most popular books of post-war Soviet literature, Alexander Fadeyev's The Young Guard, a story about the Komsomol resistance in the Ukrainian Donbas, as the basis for his opera. This book has been dramatized and filmed, and Mejtus was not the only composer inspired by the novel, but his work became the most famous. The libretto for the opera was written both Meitus and the poet Andriy Malyshko; Meitus, allegedly not satisfied with Fadeyev's book, visited Krasnodon and spoke with witnesses and members of the resistance. The reworking of the book—which is episodic and contains a number of events and characters—into an opera libretto involved a condensation of Fadeyev's plot and the selection of key events. The author's intention that The Young Guard was about a collective of personalities was preserved, and none of the characters (including leaders like Oleg Koshevoy) are typical operatic heroes.

== First performances ==
The opera was completed and staged in time for the 30th anniversary of the October Revolution, The composer and the librettist reworked the first act during rehearsals. Contemporary official staging practice was characterized by pompous choral scenes, and the creators found it difficult to promote their intended low-key staging solution. The use of a chorus was considered, but rejected.

The premiere of The Young Guard took place in Kyiv at the T. G. Shevchenko Opera and Ballet Theatre (now the National Opera of Ukraine) on 7 November 1947, conducted by V. Tolba, and directed by M. Stefanovich. The Kharkiv premiere took place on the same day.

In 1949, Meitus undertook the revision of the opera, and a new edition was staged in a number of cities in the Soviet Union. It was first performed in Russian on 20 January 1950 in Stalino (now Donetsk, Ukraine) by the Russian Opera and Ballet Theatre, and in Leningrad (now Saint Petersburg) on 22 April 1950. The opera was first performed in Moscow in August 1950. It was staged outside the Soviet Union in Prague and Gdańsk (1952), Beijing and Budapest (1959).

== Criticism ==
Following the opera's initial success, Meitus modified the part portraying Communist Party leader Procenko. On February 10, 1948, a resolution of the VKS Central Committee about V. Muradeli's opera Great Friendship was issued, which attacked its "formalism". This became the basis for the persecution of musicians and their works throughout the Soviet Union. Fadejev's novel had to be rewritten, as it was also subjected to Party criticism. Meitus was forced to rework the score on the basis of party instructions; the task was completed in the early 1950s.

== Sources ==
- Hostomská, Anna (2018). Opera – A Guide to Opera Production (11th ed.). Prague: NS Svoboda. ISBN 978-80-205-0637-5.
- Stanishevsky, Yuri Alexandrovich (1988). Оперний театр Радянської України [Opera House of Soviet Ukraine] (in Ukrainian). Kyiv: Musical Ukraine. ISBN 978-5-88510-020-5.
