= Kruzhylovsky landscape reserve =

Nature reserve in Russia

- IUCN category IV (habitat/species management area)
- Interactive map of Kruzhylovsky landscape reserve
- Location: Krasnodon Raion, Luhansk Oblast, Ukraine (de jure); Krasnodon Municipal District, LPR, Russia (de facto)
- Nearest city: Krasnodon
- Coordinates: 48°35′19″N 39°46′48″E
- Area: 102.9656 hectares (254.43 acres)
- Established: 28 February 2013
- Governing body: Ministry of Natural Resources of the LPR

Kruzhylovsky landscape reserve (Russian: Ландшафтный заказник Кружиловский; Ukrainian: Ландшафтний заказник Кружилівський) is located in the Krasnodon Municipal District / Krasnodon Raion, Parkhomenko Rural Council. It is situated on the right (southern) bank of the Donets River and covers an area of 102.9656 hectares. The majority of the territory consists of ravine (bairak) and floodplain forests. It serves as a habitat for the white-tailed eagle.

== Geography ==
The reserve is located in the far north of the Krasnodon district, northwest of the village of Kruzhylivka. The distance to the city of Krasnodon is approximately 40 kilometers. The entire northern boundary of the reserve is formed by the Donets River, which serves as the border between the region and Rostov Oblast. Along the southern edge runs the only paved road leading to the village of Kruzhylivka from the village of Makariv Yar/Parkhomenko, located 6 kilometers to the west.

== Flora ==
The majority of the reserve's territory is covered by ravine and floodplain forests, primarily consisting of sparse stands of ash and field elm. The tree composition also includes English oak and field maple. Black poplar, Siberian elm, black locust, and apricot are also found. The understory is formed by common dogwood, common buckthorn, European elderberry, European spindle, and Tatarian honeysuckle. The forest edges are overgrown with blackthorn and rosehips.
The herbaceous cover is highly diverse, including forest, meadow, and steppe species such as unspotted lungwort, ground elder, wood violet, sweet violet, St. John's wort, oregano, green figwort, and wood avens. Under the canopy of trees and shrubs grow Dictamnus albus, winter cherry, bitter vetch, as well as species listed in the local Red Data Book: Tulipa sylvestris and Fritillaria.

== Fauna ==
The reserve is one of the well-known habitats of the white-tailed eagle in the region, along with the Sukhodolskyi and Donetskyi reserves. The species is listed in the Red Data Book of the Russian Federation as rare and endangered. The rest of the fauna is represented by typical inhabitants of steppes and forests, such as European hares, hedgehogs, red foxes, and wood mice. Roe deer and wild boars are periodically observed in the adjacent forest tracts, migrating along the river corridors.

== History ==
The reserve was established by a decision of the Luhansk Oblast Council on 28 February 2013 (No. 17/39) following a proposal by the Luhansk Oblast State Administration dated 15 January 2013. It was created as the "Kruzhylivskyi Landscape Reserve of Local Importance" with an area of 102.9656 hectares to preserve forest, meadow, and steppe vegetation formations unique to the southeastern part of Ukraine, as well as the natural landscapes typical of the region.
Following the geopolitical changes and the establishment of Russian control over the area, the Council of Ministers of the Luhansk People's Republic issued a decree on 25 August 2015 (No. 02-04/253/15), reapproving the landscape reserve's protected status and maintaining its existing boundaries and Russified the reserve's name, changing it to Kruzhylovsky Landscape Reserve, following Russian naming conventions. The decree also specified that previous Ukrainian regulatory acts regarding the area remain valid until replaced by local legislation.
