= Ulyana Gromova =

Soviet Ukrainian partisan

- Уляна Громова
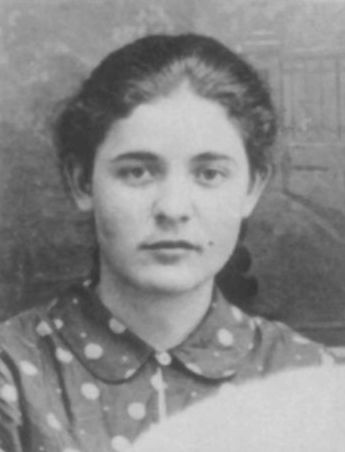
- Born: 3 January 1924; Pervomaiskyi, Ukrainian SSR, Soviet Union (now Ukraine)
- Died: 16 January 1943 (aged 19); Krasnodon, Reichskommissariat Ukraine (now Ukraine)
- Military career
- Allegiance: Soviet Union
- Service years: 1942–1943
- Unit: Young Guard
- Conflicts: World War II; Eastern Front
- Awards: Hero of the Soviet Union; Order of Lenin; Medal "To a Partisan of the Patriotic War"

Ulyana Matveyevna Gromova (Ukrainian: Уляна Матвіївна Громова, romanized: Uliana Matviyivna Hromova; Russian: Ульяна Матвеевна Громова; 3 January 1924 – 16 January 1943) was a Soviet partisan who was a member of the Young Guard resistance movement in Krasnodon, in modern-day eastern Ukraine. She was executed by the Nazis in 1943, along with the rest of the Young Guard's leadership, and was posthumously declared a Hero of the Soviet Union.

== Early life ==
Gromova was born to working-class family on 3 January 1924 in the village of Pervomaysky (English: "May First", named for International Labor Day) in what is now the Krasnodon Raion of Luhansk Oblast of Ukraine (then in the Ukrainian SSR of the Soviet Union; Lugansk Province was not established until 1938).

Gromova's father, Matthew Maximovich Gromov, was born in 1880 in Poltava Province of Ukraine, then part of the Russian Empire. Gromova's father served in the Russo-Japanese War of 1904-1905, then moved to Krasnodon and worked as mineworker, retiring in 1937. Gromova's mother (born 1884) was a housewife; the family had five children, Ulyana being the youngest. In March 1940 Ulyana Gromova joined the Komsomol (Young Communist League).

At the German invasion of the Soviet Union in 1941, Gromova was 17 years old and in tenth grade. Like many of her classmates, she worked in agriculture to replace farm workers and took care of wounded soldiers in the hospital (reading to them, helping them write letters, and so forth). She was graduated from high school with good-to-excellent marks on 3 June 1942.

== Resistance, arrest, and execution ==
When her home province was occupied by German troops, which began on 17 July 1942, Gromova was not able to evacuate because she needed to care for her sick mother. Together with Maya Peglivanovoy and Anatoly Popov, she organized patriotic young people in her village of Pervomaysky who became part in September 1942 of the "Young Guard" of the underground resistance of the Komsomol in the Soviet Union.

In October 1942 Gromova was elected a member of staff of the organization. She took an active part in the preparations for armed resistance, the creation and dissemination of anti-fascist leaflets, collecting medicines and campaigning among the population, urging them to not obey the enemy and to disrupt plans to supply the Germans with material and impress Soviet youth to work in Germany.

On the night of 7 November 1942 (on the eve of the 25th anniversary of the October Revolution), Gromova and Popov hoisted the red flag on a pipe shaft at Mine Number 1 in occupied Krasnodon.

Mass arrest of suspected underground figures began in the city, and the "Young Guard" developed an escape plan for Gromova, but she was arrested by the German authorities on 10 January 1943. She was severely beaten and tortured during interrogation, but she stayed true to her oath to her motherland and comrades and did not reveal details of the underground's activities. She was hung by her hair, burned with hot irons, had a five-pointed star cut into her back and the wound rubbed with salt, and suffered a broken arm and broken ribs. She endured her suffering stoically, and even cheered her imprisoned comrades by reciting Lermontov's epic poem Demon, which she knew by heart. Even in the note which she managed to pass secretly to her relatives, knowing her death was near, she expressed faith in victory and called for her brother Elisha to stand firmly for his homeland.

On 16 January 1943 Gromova, along with other members of the "Young Guard", was executed, and her body thrown in the 58-metre (190 ft) pit of Mine Number 5 in Krasnodon.

After the liberation of Krasnodon (which occurred on 14 February 1943), Gromova was buried with military honors on 1 March 1943 in a mass grave of patriotic heroes in the central square of Krasnodon, where a memorial to the "Young Guard" was erected.

== Awards ==
- Hero of the Soviet Union
- Order of Lenin
- Medal "Partisan of the Patriotic War" 1st Class

== Memorialization ==
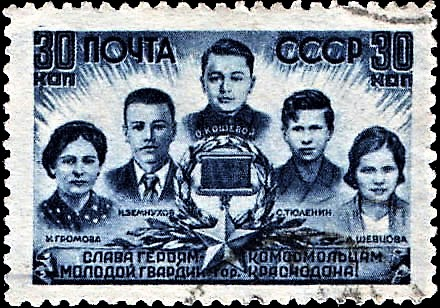
1944 Soviet stamp commemorating the Krasnodon Young Guard – Gromova is at the left

Gromova is a character (along with other characters both real and fictional) in Alexander Fadeyev's 1946 novel The Young Guard, which was included in school curriculums. In the 1948 film The Young Guard based on Fadeyev's novel, Gromova is played by Nonna Mordyukova in her film debut.

In many cities of the former Soviet Union, there are streets named for Gromova and memorials to her. For instance, in Nizhny Tagil is Ulyana Gromova Street, likewise in Kaliningrad a busy street is named for her, and Tolyatti has a memorial to her.

On 1 July 1986 the vessel "Ulyana Gromova" (a river tug) was launched in Peleduy, a town of the Sakha Republic.

In December 2022 the Ulyana Gromova street in Kyiv, Ukraine was renamed to Kateryna Stupnytska street.
