= The Young Guard (novel) =

Novel by Aleksandr Fadejev

The Young Guard (Russian: Молодая гвардия) is a 1946 Russian-language young adult historical novel (rewritten in 1951) by Soviet writer Alexander Fadeyev.

The novel describes the operations of the Young Guard, an anti-German resistance organization operating in 1942–1943 during The Great Patriotic War in and around the city of Krasnodon in eastern Ukraine. Many of the Young Guard were executed by the Germans.

Most of the main characters of the novel – Oleg Koshevoy, Uliana Gromova, Lyubov Shevtsova, Ivan Zemnukhov, Sergei Tyulenin, etc. - were actually existing people, although aspects of their characters, actions, and dialogues were invented or creatively embellished by the novelist, and there are also fictional characters in the novel.

The Young Guard was the second most popular work of children's literature in the Soviet Union for the period 1918–1986, with total sales over 276 editions of 26,143,000 copies.

== Historical background ==
Krasnodon was liberated from German occupation on 14 February 1943 (it had been occupied for less than a year, beginning in the summer of 1942). Immediately afterward, exhumation began of several dozen corpses of members of the Young Guard underground resistance organization from a pit at the Number Five Mine in Krasnodon, who had been tortured before execution by the Germans.

== Genesis of the novel ==
On the advice of Soviet head of state Mikhail Kalinin, the Central Committee of the Komsomol (Young Communist League) proposed to Fadeyev (an established writer who had already published several novels) that he write a book about the Young Guard.

Fadeyev, after reviewing materials collected by the Commission of the Central Committee of the Komsomol Krasnodon, agreed to the project and immediately went to the scene. Fadeev spent most of September 1943 in Krasnodon, collecting materials and interviewing more than a hundred witnesses (although many parents of Young Guards were too heartsick to speak to him). A few months later, Fadeyev published the article "Immortality" in Pravda, then – shocked and captivated by the Young Guards story – set his pen to work for a year and a half to create a large multidisciplinary artistic novel. The first version was published in 1946.

Prior to publication as a novel, the work was already widely know through publication in The Banner and in Komsomolskaya Pravda (8 April – 27 December 1945 and 20 February 20 – 1 March 1946); excerpts were published in the Literary Gazette, Soviet Aviation, Pioneer, Change, The Children's Friend, Bonfire, Leningrad Tonight, and Pioneer Pravda.

A film version was made in 1948.

== Second version ==
Fadeyev was strongly criticized because the novel did not vividly display the leading and guiding role of the Communist Party. Pieces offering serious ideological criticism of Fadeyev appeared in Pravda, the mouthpiece of the Central Committee of the Communist Party of the Soviet Union and thus of Stalin himself. In Fadeyev's biography a legendary encounter between Stalin and Fadeyev is reported, in which the dictator is said to have berated Fadeyev with "You have written a book that is not just worthless but ideologically harmful. You have represented the Young Guards almost as Makhnovists. But how could they have dealt effectively with the enemy in the occupied territory without Party leadership? Judging by your book they could have."

Fadeyev sat down to rewrite the novel, adding new Communist characters, and in 1951 published the second version of the novel.

== The novel's impact ==
The Young Guard was deemed appropriate for the patriotic education of the younger generation and was made a mandatory element of the school curriculum in 1947. Study of the novel began in the fifth grade; the literary curriculum for the second semester was built on literature as a call to action, beginning with Lermontov's Borodino through excerpts of War and Peace, Gorky's My Childhood and many others, with four lessons on The Young Guard included. The tenth grade curriculum included reading, study and discussion of major sections of the novel.

This inclusion of the novel in the curriculum remained essentially unchanged throughout the life of the Soviet Union. (However, after the publication of the 1951 revised version, teachers had to explain the differences in the two versions as being due to the writer's desire to more closely adhere to historical fact rather than to Party intervention; this soon became unneeded as copies of the first version were withdrawn from circulation).

By the end of the 1980s the novel was seen as part of the ideological mainstream, and the novel's non-fictitious characters were awarded with medals and streets named after them in various cities, and meetings were held demanding that the traitors who betrayed the Young Guards be found and severely punished (it is generally assumed that the Young Guard was broken with the aid of local informants, although who they were has never been determined).

Not all the events described by Fadeyev actually happened. The novel contained many errors and inaccuracies which seriously affected the later fate of some real people: several real people who were believed to be prototypes for characters in the novel who were presented as traitors were therefore accused of treason in real life. These persons insisted on their innocence, and were later exonerated.

Fadeev explained this with "I was not writing a history of the Young Guard, but rather a novel, which allows, indeed requires, literary inventions". According to Georgi Arutyuniantz, a Young Guard survivor, Fadeyev told him:

[As to] why the novel in some places breaks with history, and combines the roles of some individuals... I did not and could not undertake to tell the story of the Young Guard day by day and event by event; that is work for historians, not novelists. Rather I wanted to paint a picture showing the heroism of Soviet youth, their great faith in victory, and the righteousness of our cause. Death itself – even a brutal, horrible death of torture and suffering – was not able to shake the spirit, the will, the courage of the young people. They died astounding and even frightening their enemies... and this was to be the leitmotif of the novel...

You see, and I make no secret of it: I came to deeply love these simple, wonderful kids. I admired and felt humbled by their spontaneity, sincerity, honesty and incorruptible fidelity to the Komsomol. That is why I wrote what I wrote... I know that, in summing up the characteristics of these heroes, I have taken a step away from pure history, a small step, though visible to you [an actual participant]. Yet it was a deliberate step.

— Alexander Fadeyev, quoted by Georgi Arutyuniantz in his memoirs

Zhou Yang praised Fadeyev and The Young Guard for presenting "totally new characters of a kind unprecedented in human history, a kind of character possessed of the highest communist spirit and moral qualities. In their work in creating typical images of positive characters according to the conditions of actual life, beloved Soviet writers have completed their most glorious task of serving as 'engineers of the human soul.'"

== Investigation of the events described in the novel ==
After the collapse of the Soviet Union, the underground movement in Krasondon was further scrutinized.

In 1993, a special commission which had been formed to study the history of the Young Guard gave a press conference in Luhansk (described in Isvestia 12 May 1993). After two years of work, the commission's assessment of the various versions of events attracted public interest, even after almost half a century had passed since the events. The conclusions of the commission were limited to a few main points.

In July and August 1942, after the capture by the Germans of Luhansk Province, various clandestine youth groups arose spontaneously. These groups, according to the testimony of contemporaries, born names such as "Star", "Hammer", "Sickle", and so forth. What role (if any) the Party had in forming and leading these groups is uncertain.

In October 1942, Viktor Tretyakevich united these groups in the Young Guard. It was he, not Oleg Koshevoy (according to the findings of the commission) who became leader of the underground organization. Participation in the Young Guards was almost double what had been thought. The Young Guards undertook risky activities and this led to losses and the eventual failure of the organization.

== Literature ==
- Juliane Furst. Perfect Communists // Stalin's last generation : Soviet post-war youth and the emergence of mature socialism. — Oxford: Oxford University Press, 2010. — pp. 139–158. — xiv, 391 p. — ISBN 978-0-19-957506-0. — ISBN 0-19-957506-1.
