= The Children's Friend =

The Children's Friend was the name of three historical periodicals:

- The Children's Friend (British magazine): a magazine for children published between 1824 and 1930
- The Children's Friend (LDS magazine): a magazine for children in The Church of Jesus Christ of Latter-day Saints between 1902 and 1970, retitled The Friend in 1971
- The Children's Friend (Soviet magazine): a magazine for rural children published between 1927 and 1953.

Also:

- The Children's Friend: A New-Year's Present, to the Little Ones from Five to Twelve: an 1821 booklet containing the first publication of the poem Old Santeclaus with Much Delight.
