= Banov =

Banov or Bánov may refer to:

- Bánov, Slovakia, a municipality and village
  - TJ Jednota Bánová, a Slovak football team from Bánov
- Bánov (Uherské Hradiště District), a municipality and village in the Czech Republic
- Banov, a village in Poeni Commune, Teleorman County, Romania
- Banova Jaruga, a village in Croatia
- Banov (surname)
