= Ivan Turkenich =

Soviet Russian partisan leader

- Іван Туркенич
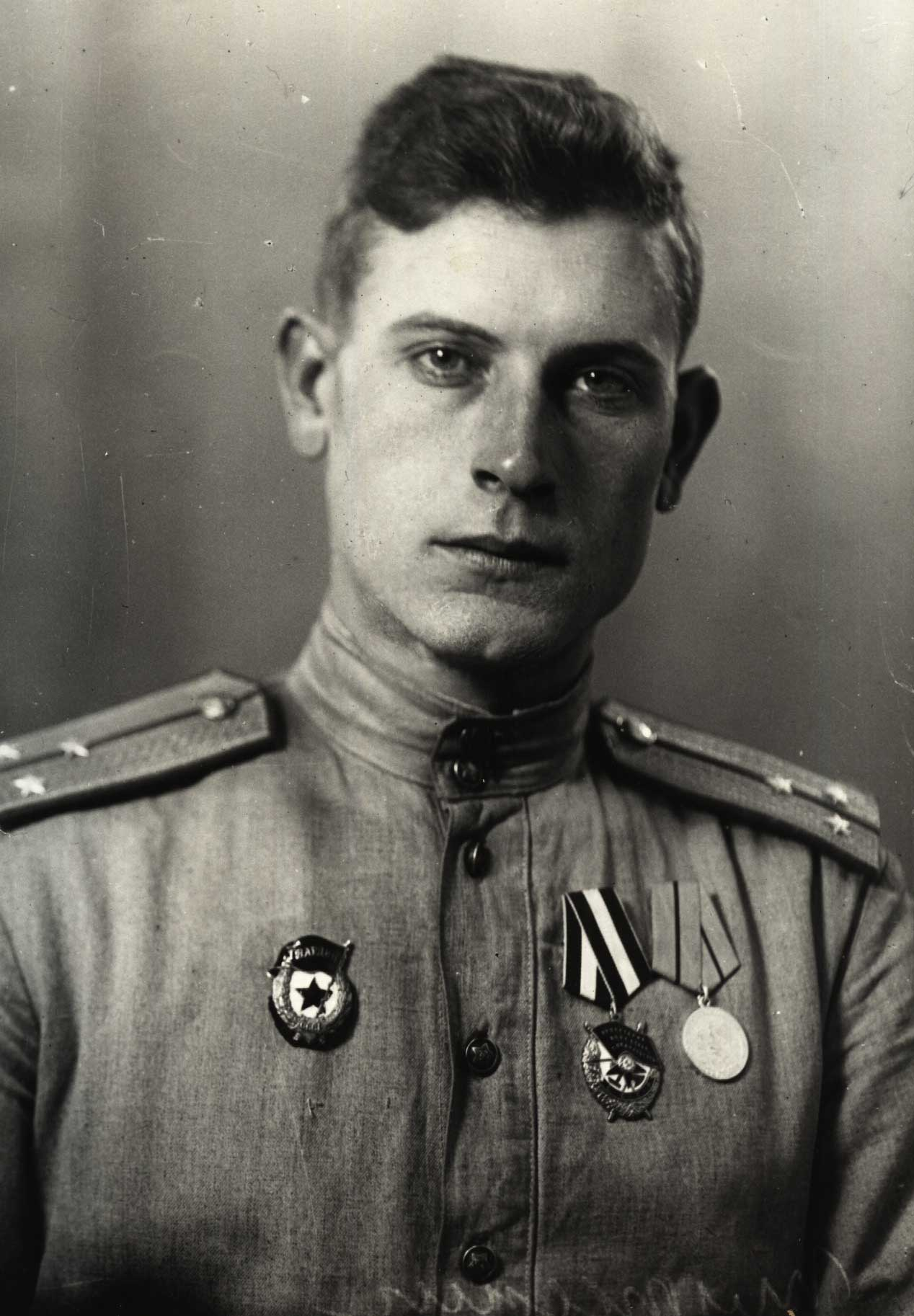
- Turkenich in 1943
- Born: 15 January 1920; Novy Liman, Voronezh Oblast, Russian SFSR, Soviet Union
- Died: 14 August 1944 (aged 24); Głogów Małopolski, General Government, Greater German Reich (now Poland)
- Burial place: Rzeszów, Poland
- Military career
- Allegiance: Soviet Union
- Branch: Soviet Army
- Service years: 1941–1944
- Rank: Captain
- Units: Young Guard; 54th Guards Rifle Division
- Conflicts: World War II; Eastern Front; Operation Gallop

Ivan Vasilyevich Turkenich (Note: Russian: Иван Васильевич Туркенич Ukrainian: Іван Васильович Туркенич, romanized: Ivan Vasylovych Turkenych) (15 January 1920 – 14 August 1944) was a Soviet partisan, one of the leaders of the underground anti-Nazi organization Young Guard, which operated in Krasnodon district during World War II between 1941 and 1944.

== Biography ==
Turkenich was born on 15 January 1920, in Novyi Liman, Voronezh Oblast in a family of Ukrainian ethnicity. His father was a miner. After graduation from the 7th grade, he was matriculated to Voroshilov pedagogical institute. In March 1938, he became a member of the Komsomol. In 1938, Turkenich studied in a Sevastopol railroad trade school. In 1940, he began his studies in an anti-aircraft artillery military academy.

In June 1941, Turkenich graduated from the academy and was commissioned as a lieutenant in the Red Army. From May to June 1942, he was a deputy executive officer in the 614th anti-tank artillery regiment. In one of its engagements he was captured by Germans, escaped from imprisonment and joined the anti-Nazi resistance in occupied Krasnodon. He became one of the leaders of the Young Guard, a resistance organization comprising members the Komsomol. In June 1944, Turkenich became a member of the Communist Party of the Soviet Union.

When the Young Guard was compromised and most of its members arrested by Nazis, Turkenich managed to escape. He crossed the front lines and rejoined the uniformed Red Army. He was promoted to command a mortar battery in the 163rd regiment. On 13 August 1944, Turkenich was mortally wounded in a battle near Głogów Małopolski, Poland. He died in the field hospital a day later on 14 August 1944.

For his leadership and bravery, Turkenich was awarded the Order of Red Banner, the Medal "Partisan of the Patriotic War" (1st class), and the Order of the Patriotic War (1st class). In 1990, Turkenich was also awarded the title of Hero of the Soviet Union.
