= Banov (surname) =

Banov (Russian: Банов, Bulgarian: Банов) is a Slavic masculine surname, its feminine counterpart is Banova. Notable people with the surname include:

- Andriana Bânova (born 1987), Bulgarian triple jumper
- Ivan Banov (1916–1982), Soviet partisan leader
