= Medal "To a Partisan of the Patriotic War" =

World War II Soviet paramilitary award

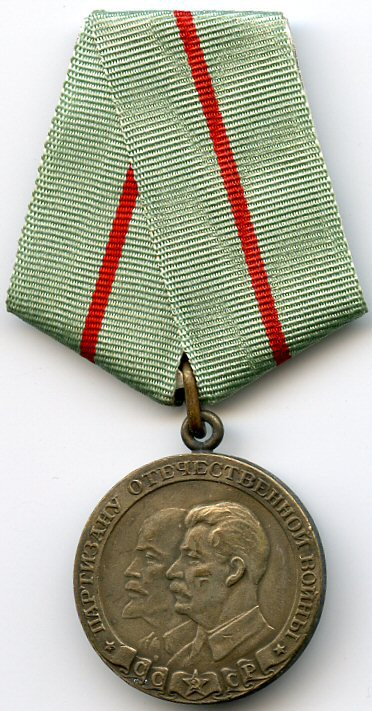
- Medal "To a Partisan of the Patriotic War" 1st class (obverse)
- Type: Campaign medal
- Awarded for: Participation in the resistance against the Fascist invaders behind enemy lines
- Presented by: USSR
- Eligibility: Citizens of the Soviet Union
- Status: No longer awarded
- Established: February 2, 1943

Highlights
- Total: 1st class: 56,883; 2nd class: 70,992
- 1st class 2nd class Ribbons of the Medal "To a Partisan of the Patriotic War"

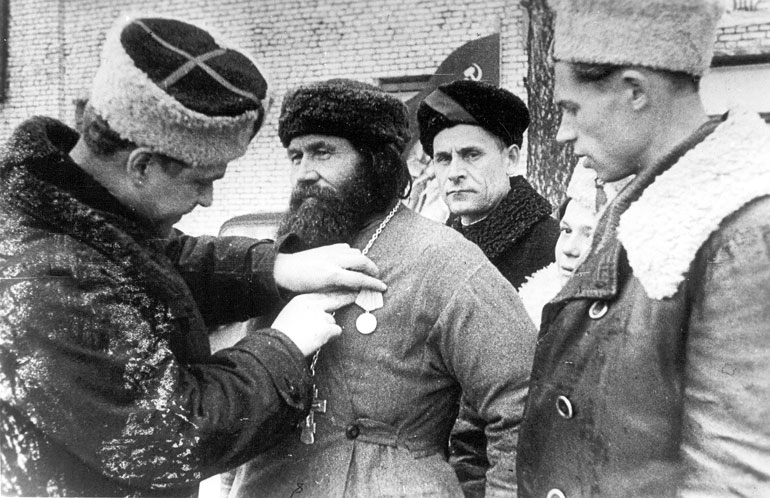
A village priest being awarded the Medal "To a Partisan of the Patriotic War" 2nd class in Ukraine

The Medal "To a Partisan of the Patriotic War" (Russian: Медаль «Партизану Отечественной войны», Medal "Partizanu Otechestvennoi voiny") was a World War II Soviet paramilitary award established in two classes on February 2, 1943, by decree of the Presidium of the Supreme Soviet of the USSR. to recognise the fortitude and courage of the partisans on the home front in their struggle to free the Soviet Motherland of the Nazi invaders far behind enemy lines. Its statute was amended by a further decree of the Presidium of the Supreme Soviet of the USSR on February 26, 1947.

== Medal statute ==
The Medal "To a Partisan of the Patriotic War" was awarded in two classes.

- The medal first class was awarded to partisans, to leaders and organizers of partisan units, for outstanding achievements in organizing the guerrilla movement, for bravery, heroism and outstanding achievements displayed in the partisan struggle in the occupied territories of our Soviet Motherland far behind the Nazi lines.
- The medal second class was awarded to partisans, to leaders and organizers of partisan units, for personal distinction in combat, in the execution of orders and command assignments, for active support of the guerrilla struggle against the Nazi invaders.

The Medal "To a Partisan of the Patriotic War" was bestowed on behalf of the Presidium of the Supreme Soviet of the USSR. It was worn on the left side of the chest and in the presence of other medals of the Soviet Union, immediately following the Medal "For Labour Valour". When worn in the presence of orders and medals of the Russian Federation, the latter have precedence.

Medals "To a Partisan of the Patriotic War" awarded posthumously, along with their relevant award certificates, are transferred to the families for safekeeping and as a memento.

== Medal description ==
The Medal "To a Partisan of the Patriotic War" was a 32mm in diameter circular medal, the medal first class was struck in silver, the medal second class was struck in brass. Their identical obverses bore the left bust profiles of Lenin and Stalin, the latter being the closer and slightly to the right. A 3mm wide relief ribbon ran along the entire circumference of the medal, at its very bottom, a relief five pointed star bearing a hammer and sickle and bisecting the inscription "USSR" (Russian: «СССР»), on the remainder of the ribbon, the relief inscription "To a Partisan of the Patriotic War" (Russian: «Партизану Отечественной войны»). On their also identical reverses, the relief inscription in three lines "For our Soviet Motherland" (Russian: «За нашу Советскую Родину», Za nashu Sovetskuyo Rodinu), above the inscription, the relief image of the hammer and sickle.

The Medal "To a Partisan of the Patriotic War" was secured by a ring through the medal suspension loop to a standard Soviet pentagonal mount covered by an overlapping 24mm light green silk moiré ribbon, the ribbon for the medal first class had a 2mm wide red central stripe, the stripe was blue for the medal second class.

First Class	Reverse	Second Class

== Recipients (partial list) ==
The individuals below were all recipients of the Medal "To a Partisan of the Patriotic War".

- Dmitry Nikolayevich Medvedev, Hero of the Soviet Union
- Oleksiy Fedorov, twice Hero of the Soviet Union
- Ina Konstantinova, wartime diarist and Soviet partisan
- Valentin Kotyk, partisan scout, posthumous Hero of the Soviet Union
- Ivan Turkenich, Ukrainian partisan, posthumous Hero of the Soviet Union
- Pyotr Vershigora, Hero of the Soviet Union
- Vladimir Druzhynin, Hero of the Soviet Union
- Ivan Banov, Hero of the Soviet Union
- Ilya Starinov
- Semyon Rudniev, posthumous Hero of the Soviet Union
- Pyotr Masherov, Hero of the Soviet Union
- Sydir Kovpak, twice Hero of the Soviet Union
- Vasily Korzh, Hero of the Soviet Union
- Ivan Sergeychik, NKVD political commissar with the partisans
- Alexander Saburov, teenage partisan and Hero of the Soviet Union
- Ales Adamovich, teenage partisan
- Oleg Koshevoy, founder of the partisan organisation Young Guard
- Oleg Antonov, aircraft designer
- M. A. Yegorov, Hero of the Soviet Union
- Pavel Sudoplatov, Lieutenant General
- Alexander Golovanov, Chief Marshal of Aviation
- Alexander Shelepin Chairman of the KGB from 1958 to 1961

== See also ==
- Soviet partisans
- The Young Guard
- Guerrilla warfare
- Orders, decorations, and medals of the Soviet Union
