= Kateryna Stupnytska =

Ukrainian military officer (1996–2022)

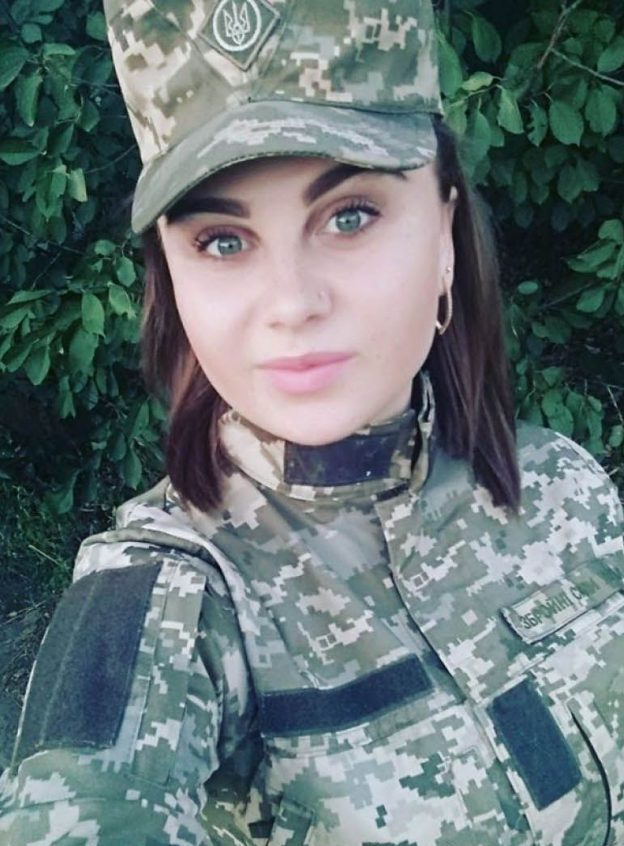
- Native name: Катерина Вікторівна Ступницька
- Born: 11 April 1996; Zaliznytsia, Rivne Oblast, Ukraine
- Died: 8 March 2022 (aged 25)
- Allegiance: Ukraine
- Branch: Armed Forces of Ukraine
- Rank: Sergeant
- Conflicts: Russo-Ukrainian War; Russian invasion of Ukraine †
- Awards: Order of the Gold Star (posthumously)

Kateryna Viktorivna Stupnytska (Ukrainian: Катерина Вікторівна Ступницька; 11 April 1996 – 8 March 2022) was a sergeant of the Armed Forces of Ukraine. She was posthumously honoured with the title Hero of Ukraine with the award of the Order of the Golden Star during the 2022 Russian invasion of Ukraine.

== Biography ==
Kateryna Stupnytska was born in April 1996 in Zaliznytsia village, Rivne Oblast. She graduated from Dubno Medical College. Her first job was at an urgent care centre in Danychiv village, Rivne Oblast.

Stupnytska then joined the military. Beginning in 2016, she served as a sanitary instructor for the 3rd Mechanised Battalion dispensary in the military unit in Volodymyr, Volyn Oblast. Repeatedly, with being on short furlough, she was at the forefront in Joint Forces Operation. In September 2021 she prolonged her military contract for another year.

She was killed in action while fighting Russian forces in Kyiv Oblast. Her funeral took place in Korets town, Rivne Oblast on 11 March 2022, and the next day she was buried in her native village.

In December 2022 the Ulyana Gromova street in Kyiv, Ukraine, was renamed to Kateryna Stupnytska street.

== Awards ==
"Hero of Ukraine" title with the award of the Order of the Golden Star (Zolota Zirka) (2022, posthumously) – for personal courage and heroism, manifested in the defence of the state sovereignty and the territorial integrity of Ukraine, military loyalty.
