= Ivan Sergeychik =

Belarusian NKVD officer

- Іван Іосіфавіч Сяргейчык
- Born: June 6, 1906; Belgres, Orsha district, Belarusian SSR, USSR
- Died: April 6, 1973 (aged 66)
- Military career
- Allegiance: Soviet Union
- Branch: Army
- Service years: 1942–1943
- Rank: Political commissar
- Unit: 1st Vitsebsk Partisan Brigade: Sozonov Detachment #41
- Awards: Medal "To a Partisan of the Patriotic War", 2nd class Medal "For the Victory over Germany in the Great Patriotic War 1941–1945" Medal "For Battle Merit"
- Other work: Member of NKVD

Ivan Iosifovich Sergeychik (Belarusian: Іван Іосіфавіч Сяргейчык; Russian: Иван Иосифович Сергейчик; June 6, 1906 – April 6, 1973) was a Belarusian Soviet NKVD-official and military commander.

== History ==
=== Early life ===
Sergeychik was born in 1906 in a village in the Orsha district in Vitebsk region.

From November 1931 through March 1935 he worked for the State Political Directorate (OGPU), and from March 1935 through November 1937 he worked as special prosecutor for NKVD in Minsk, Belarus.

=== World War II ===
Shortly after the outbreak of World War II on the Eastern Front, Belarus got heavily engaged in Soviet partisan warfare.

In September 1942, Ivan Sergeychik was parachuted into the forest somewhere in the region of Bogushevsk, Vitsebsk voblast. Initially, he was a squad leader. Later, as a political commissar (#4 of his detachment), he joined Sozonov Detachment #41 that was a part of the 1st Vitsebsk Partisan Brigade. To document his activity he kept a diary. His diary covered a period between 19 September 1942 and 27 July 1943. Throughout this period, his detachment actively participated in various diversions including placing improvised explosive devices along the roads and railroads; ambushed individual German units and involved in direct battles with regular German army. As a result of the direct confrontations with the German troops, 376 German soldiers and officers were killed and 314 were wounded. Throughout this period, the placement of the IEDs along the railroad tracks destroyed nine train engines, destroyed and damaged 135 cars with hundreds of German troops, heavy equipment and supplies. The detachment destroyed about half mile of railroad tracks and created transportation delays on the Smolensk line for 108 hours total. The detachment routinely destroyed communication lines and telephone poles.

=== Exit ===
Because of a malaria outbreak, in July 1943 Ivan Sergeychik was evacuated to Moscow and after his recovery he resumed his duties working for NKVD. He returned to Belarus for this work, as opposed to staying in Russia. He was awarded multiple Soviet awards for his participation in the partisan campaign, including the Medal "Partisan of the Patriotic War" 2nd class and the Medal "For the Victory over Germany in the Great Patriotic War 1941–1945". He was additionally awarded the Medal "For Battle Merit".
