= Nonna Mordyukova =

Soviet and Russian actress

- Нонна Мордюкова
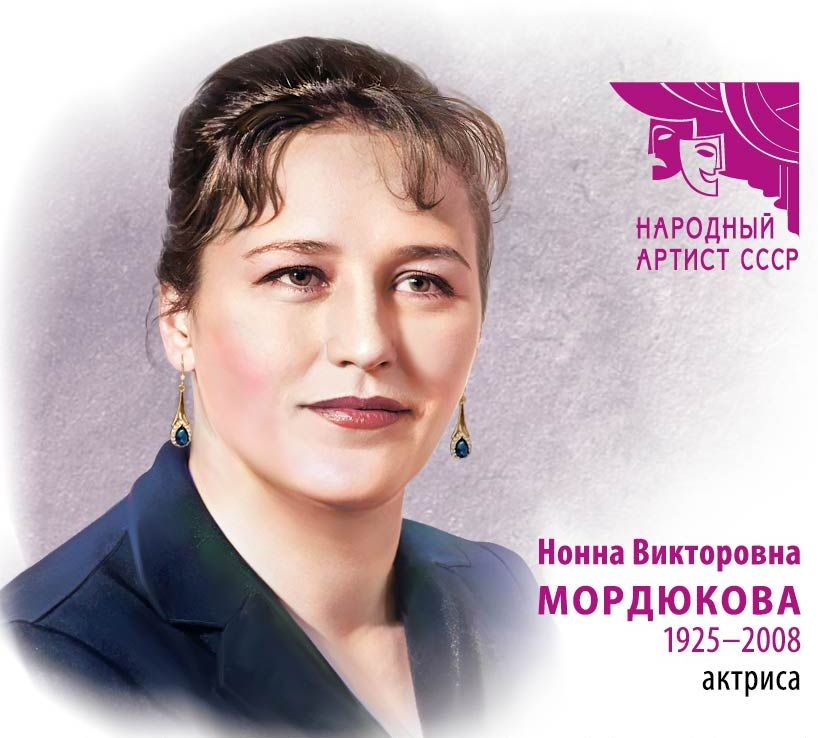
- Mordyukova as depicted on a stamp celebrating the centennial of her birth
- Born: Noyabrina Mordyukova; 25 November 1925; Kostiantynivka, Donetsk Oblast, Soviet Union
- Died: 6 July 2008 (aged 82); Moscow, Russia
- Occupation: Actress
- Years active: 1948–1999
- Spouse: Vyacheslav Tikhonov (divorced)

Noyabrina Viktorovna Mordyukova (Russian: Ноябри́на (Но́нна) Ви́кторовна Мордюко́ва; 25 November 1925 – 6 July 2008) was a Soviet and Russian actress and People's Artist of the USSR (1974). She was the star of film like director Nikita Mikhalkov's 1980s hit Family Relations. She was one of the most outstanding Russian film actresses of the 20th century.

== Biography ==
Nonna (Noyabrina) Viktorovna was born into a large family in the Cossack village of Konstantinovka, Donetsk Region, Ukrainian SSR. Nonna spent her childhood in a settlement where her mother worked as chairwoman of a kolkhoz (collective farm).

In 1946, Mordyukova entered the Actors’ Faculty of VGIK and studied there under Boris Bibikov and Olga Pyzhova. After graduating she played on the stage of the Theatre Studio of Film Actor and was often featured by film directors.

In 1948, Mordyukova was married to actor Vyacheslav Tikhonov and had a son (now deceased) by him. The two were divorced in 1963.

== Career ==
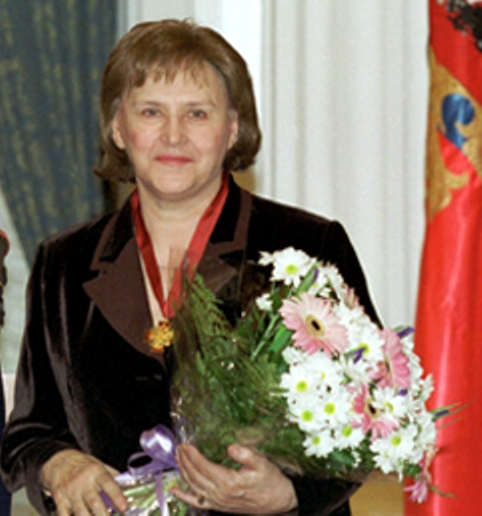
Mordyukova in 2000

In 1949, she was awarded the Stalin Prize for the role of Ulyana Gromova in The Young Guard movie. It was her debut film role.

Her filmography reveals, however, that while she has had the chance to work with a constellation of the best Soviet directors, it has usually been for one project only. There is no high-profile director with whom she has a continuous working relationship.

After her work for Sergei Gerassimov on The Young Guard, she was cast in the last movie of veteran Vsevolod Pudovkin, The Return of Vasili Bortnikov (1952).

Other one-time collaborations with well-known directors have been with Mikhail Shvejtser for Chuzhaya rodnya (1955); Lev Kulidzhanov for Otchij dom (1959); Leonid Gaidai for The Diamond Arm; Andrei Konchalovsky for the Turgenev adaptation Dvoryanskoye gnyezdo (1969); Grigori Chukhrai for Tryasina (1978); Eldar Ryazanov for Railway Station for Two, and Nikolai Gubenko for Zapretnaya zona (1988).

She appeared only once in a film by Nikita Mikhalkov, who structured his village comedy-drama Kinfolk (1981) entirely around the personality of the actress, who had by that time established herself as an epitome of the Russian peasant woman.

The role of Klavdia Vavilova, a robust and boisterous Red Army Commissar who has accidentally become pregnant in Aleksandr Askoldov's Commissar (1967) is Mordyukova's most memorable work. The film, shot in 1966, was shelved and was only released in 1988. By that time Mordyukova was over sixty and had starred in over twenty other films.

Mordyukova received a FIPRESCI Award, an Otto Dibelius Film Award, a Special Jury Prize at the Berlin International Film Festival, and Silver Spur Award (Flanders International Film Festival) for The Commissar.

During perestroika, Mordyukova appeared in a number of supporting roles in a range of comedy-dramas. Similarly, she has been a highly visible presence throughout the 1990s, with supporting roles in some of the most-popular Russian features, such as Pavel Lungin's Luna Park (1992) and Vladimir Menshov's Shirli-Myrli (1995).

In 1999 she played the leading role in Mother (1999), directed by Denis Yevstigneyev; a family saga loosely based on a real story, mixing melodrama and comedy elements, and spanning over several decades.

"Russian cinema goers and critics call Mordyukova one of the best actresses of the 20th century."

In over fifty years of cinematic work she has played in dozens of films, where she acted mainly as an ordinary Russian Woman.

== Accolades ==
- In November 2000, Russian President Vladimir Putin signed a presidential decree awarding the Order of Merit for the Fatherland, third degree, to Mordyukova.
- The asteroid 4022 Nonna is named after Nonna Mordyukova.

== Filmography ==
Year	English Title	Original Title	Role	Notes
1948	The Young Guard	Молодая гвардия	Uliana Gromova	
1953	The Return of Vasili Bortnikov	Возвращение Василия Бортникова	Nastya Ogorodnikova	
1954	Viburnum Grove	Калиновая роща	Nadezhda Romanyuk	
1955	Stars on the Wings	Звёзды на крыльях	Fisherwoman	Uncredited
1956	Other People's Relatives	Чужая Родня	Stesha Ryashkina	
1957	Ekaterina Voronina	Екатерина Воронина	Dusya Oshurkova	
1958	Volunteers	Добровольцы	Subway Builder	Uncredited
1959	A Home for Tanya	Отчий Дом	Stepanida	
1959	The Sisters	Хождение по мукам	Matryona Krasilnikova	(segment “Gloomy Morning")
1960	Everything Starts From The Road	Всё начинается с дороги	Dasha Bokova, Stepan's wife	
1960	A Simple Story	Простая история	Sasha Potapova	
1960	Three Stories by Chekhov (film almanac)	Три рассказа Чехова	Alyakhin's wife	(segment "Vanka")
1962	Pavlukha	Павлуха	Natalya	
1963	Secretary of the Regional Committee	Секретарь обкома	Natalya Fadeevna	
1964	The Chairman	Председатель	Donya Trubnikova	
1965	Balzaminov's Marriage	Женитьба Бальзаминова	Belotelova	
1965	Thirty Three	Тридцать три	Galina Pristyazhnyuk	
1966	War and Peace	Война и мир	Anisya Fyodorovna	part 1, 2
1966	Uncle's Dream	Дядюшкин сон	Sofya Petrovna Karpukhina, wife of a colonel	
1969	Zhuravushka	Журавушка	Glafira	
1969	The Diamond Arm	Бриллиантовая рука	Varvara Pliushch	
1970	Shine, Shine, My Star	Гори, гори, моя звезда	Madame	
1970	The Polynin Case	Случай с Польниным	Dusya Kuzmicheva	
1970	The Ballad of Bering and His Friends	Баллада о Беринге и его Друзьях	Empress Anna Ioannovna	
1971	Young	Молодые	Daria Vasilievna	
1972	Russian Field	Русское поле	Fedosia Ugryumova	
1973	Tomorrow Will Be Too Late	Завтра будет поздно	Kuzurka	
1974	Lev Gurych Sinichkin	Лев Гурыч Синичкин	Raisa Minichna Surmilova, theater prima	
1974	No Return	Возврата нет	Antonina Kashirina	
1974	Two Days of Anxiety	Два дня тревоги	Mavra Grigorievna	
1975	They Fought for Their Country	Они сражались за Родину	Natalya Stepanovna	
1975	Ivanov Family	Семья Ивановых	Maria Petrovna Ivanova	
1978	Incognito from St. Petersburg	Инкогнито из Петербурга	Anna Andreevna	
1978	Untypical Story	Нетипичная история	Matryona Bystrova	
1979	Faith and Truth	Верой и правдой	aunt Panya	
1982	Family Relations	Родня	Maria Konovalova	
1983	Station for Two	Вокзал для двоих	Uncle Misha	
1986	From Paycheck to Paycheck	От зарплаты до зарплаты	Olga Ivanovna Plisova	
1987	Daughter	Доченька	Zinaida Yakovlevna, janitor	
1987	The Commissar	Комиссар	Klavdiya Vavilova	
1987	Loan For Marriage	Сауда на Брак	Tatyana Ivanovna	
1988	Restricted Area	Запретная зона	Nadezhda Avdotina	
1991	Running Target	Бегущая мишень	grandma Zina	
1992	Luna Park	Луна-парк	Aunt	
1995	What a Mess!	Ширли-мырли	Registry Office Worker	
1999	Mother	Мама	mother	(final film role)

== Honours and awards ==
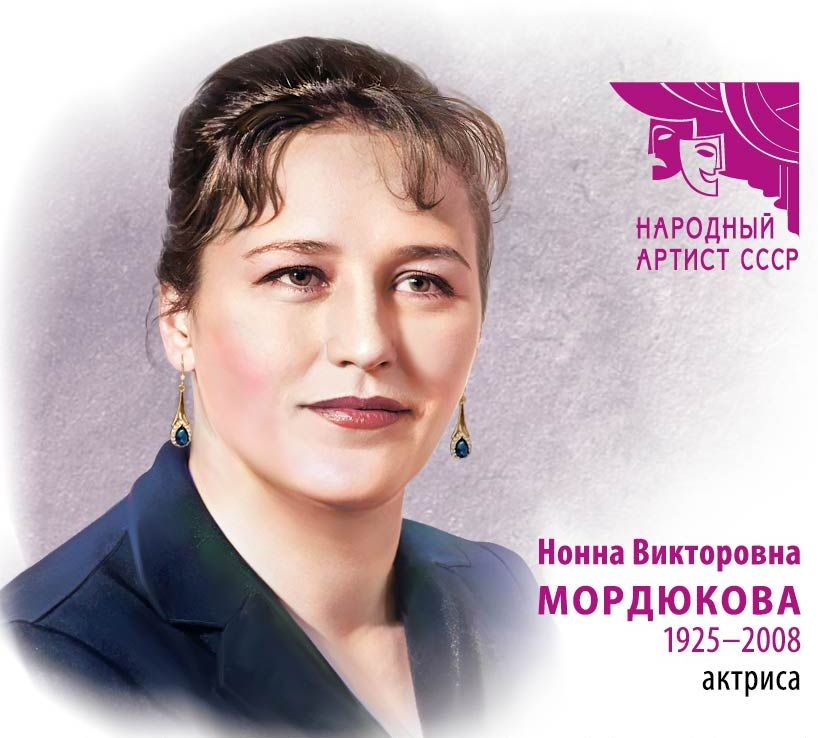
Mordyukova on a 2025 postcard of Russia

State awards

- Order of Merit for the Fatherland;
  - 2nd class (25 November 2005) for outstanding contribution to the development of national culture and cinema, many years of creative activity
  - 3rd class (23 November 2000) for his great personal contribution to the development of cinematography
  - 4th class (27 November 1995) for services to the state and many years of fruitful work in the arts and culture
- Order of Friendship of Peoples (1985)
- Order of the Badge of Honour (1975)
- People's Artist of the USSR (1974)
- People's Artist of the RSFSR (1969)
- Honoured Artist of the RSFSR (1965)

Awards

- Stalin Prize, 1st class (1949) - for his role in the film Uliana Gromova, "Young Guard" '
- State Prize of the RSFSR Vasiliev brothers (1973) - for roles in "Crane", "President", etc.
- Prize of the President of Russia (2001) in art and literature

Public Awards

- National Film Award "Nika" (2004) in the "honour and dignity"
- Premium business circles of Russia, "Idol" (1999) in the nomination "For high service to art"
- Award "Kinotavr" (1996) in the "President's Council Award for creative careers"
- Award "Golden Aries" (1995) in the "Man of cinematic year"
- Recognised as one of the 10 most prominent actresses of the 20th century (1992) - according to the Editorial Board of the British reference book Who's Who
