= 4022 Nonna =

Asteroid

Discovery
- Discovered by: L. Chernykh
- Discovery site: Crimea–Nauchnij
- Discovery date: 8 October 1981

Designations
- Named after: Nonna Mordyukova (Soviet actress)
- Alternative designations: 1981 TL_{4} · 1966 PC; 1984 OJ
- Minor planet category: main-belt · (inner); Vestian

Orbital characteristics
- Epoch 23 March 2018 (JD 2458200.5)
- Uncertainty parameter 0
- Observation arc: 65.34 yr (23,865 d)
- Aphelion: 2.6585 AU
- Perihelion: 2.0576 AU
- Semi-major axis: 2.3580 AU
- Eccentricity: 0.1274
- Orbital period (sidereal): 3.62 yr (1,323 d)
- Mean anomaly: 99.638°
- Mean motion: 0° 16^{m} 19.92^{s} / day
- Inclination: 5.0911°
- Longitude of ascending node: 278.34°
- Argument of perihelion: 34.066°

Physical characteristics
- Mean diameter: 3.67±7.00 km 7.13 km (calculated)
- Synodic rotation period: 2.5868±0.0002 h (Note: Pravec (2010) web: lightcurve plot of (4022) Nonna with a rotation period 2.5868±0.0002 hours and a brightness amplitude of 0.10±0.01 mag from March 2010. Quality Code is 3. Summary figures at the LCDB and Pravec, P.; Wolf, M.; Sarounova, L. (2010) with data sheet); 2.5873±0.0003 h (Note: Pravec (2016) web: lightcurve plot of (4022) Nonna with a rotation period 2.5873±0.0003 hours and a brightness amplitude of 0.09±0.01 mag from April 2016. Quality Code is 3. Summary figures at the LCDB and Pravec, P.; Wolf, M.; Sarounova, L. (2016) with data sheet) (Note: Pravec (2017) lightcurve plot of (4022) Nonna with a rotation period of 2.5873±0.0001 hours and an amplitude of 0.088 mag, from October 2017. Ondrejov data obtained by the NEO Photometric Program and collaborating projects with data sheet); 2.5877±0.0005 h (Note: Galad/Pravec (2006) lightcurve plot of (4022) Nonna with a rotation period of 2.578 hours and an amplitude of 0.077 mag, from September 2006. Ondrejov data obtained by the NEO Photometric Program and collaborating projects with data sheet); 2.62±0.02 h (Note: Period by René Roy from August 2003, corrected by the LCDB. Original period reported: 1.31 hours; amended to 2.62 hours. LCDB-comment: "this seems unlikely and so the double period was entered for the details record". Quality code of 2-.)
- Geometric albedo: 0.20 (assumed); 0.907±0.440
- Spectral type: QV · S (assumed)
- Absolute magnitude (H): 12.90 · 13.1; 13.45±0.47

4022 Nonna, provisional designation 1981 TL_{4}, is a Vestian asteroid from the inner regions of the asteroid belt, approximately 4 kilometers (2.5 miles) kilometers in diameter. It was discovered on 8 October 1981, by Soviet–Russian astronomer Lyudmila Chernykh at the Crimean Astrophysical Observatory. The asteroid was named after Soviet actress Nonna Mordyukova. The nearly fast rotator has an exceptionally low lightcurve-amplitude indicating a nearly spherical shape.

== Orbit and classification ==
Nonna is a member of the Vesta family (401). Vestian asteroids have a composition akin to cumulate eucrites (HED meteorites) and are thought to have originated deep within 4 Vesta's crust, possibly from the Rheasilvia crater, a large impact crater on its southern hemisphere near the South pole, formed as a result of a subcatastrophic collision. Vesta is the main belt's second-largest and second-most-massive body after Ceres.

It orbits the Sun in the inner main-belt at a distance of 2.1–2.7 AU once every 3 years and 7 months (1,323 days; semi-major axis of 2.36 AU). Its orbit has an eccentricity of 0.13 and an inclination of 5° with respect to the ecliptic. The asteroid was first observed at Goethe Link Observatory in October 1952. The body's observation arc begins with its observation as 1966 PC at Crimea-Nauchnij in August 1966, more than 15 years prior to its official discovery observation.

== Physical characteristics ==
Nonna has been characterized as a Q- and V-type asteroid by Pan-STARRS' photometric survey, while the Collaborative Asteroid Lightcurve Link (CALL) assumes it to be a common S-type asteroid. The overall spectral type of Vestian asteroids is typically that of a V-type.

=== Rotation period ===
Since 2006, several rotational lightcurves of Nonna have been obtained from photometric observations at Modra Observatory by astronomers Adrián Galád and Petr Pravec. Analysis of the best-rated lightcurve from September 2006 gave a rotation period of 2.5877 hours with a brightness variation of 0.077 magnitude (U=3). A measurement by French amateur astronomer René Roy gave a similar result of 2.62 hours, after using an alternative period solution. All lightcurves showed an unusually low amplitude which is indicative for a spheroidal shape. The asteroid's short period is close to that of a fast rotator.

=== Diameter and albedo ===
According to the survey carried out by the NEOWISE mission of NASA's Wide-field Infrared Survey Explorer, Nonna measures 3.67 kilometers in diameter and its surface has an exceptionally high albedo of 0.907. Conversely, CALL assumes a standard stony albedo of 0.20 and calculates a much larger diameter of 7.13 kilometers based on an absolute magnitude of 13.1.

== Naming ==
This minor planet was named after Soviet cinema actress Nonna Mordyukova (1925–2008), a celebrated People's Artist of the USSR. The official naming citation was published by the Minor Planet Center on 25 August 1991 (M.P.C. 18645).
