= Yuliy Meitus =

Ukrainian composer (1903–1997)

People's Artist Yuliy Meitus
- Юлій Мейтус
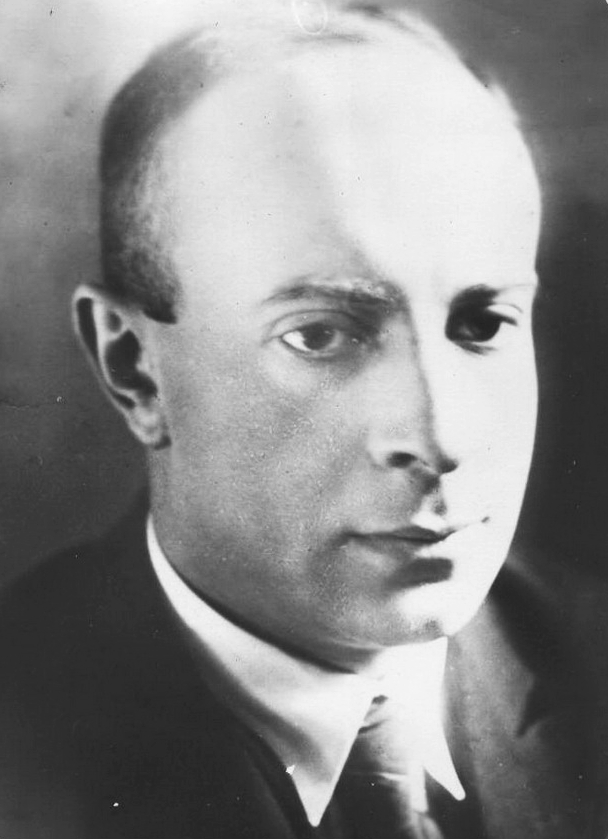
- Born: 28 January 1903; Yelysavethrad, Russian Empire
- Died: 2 April 1997 (aged 94); Kyiv, Ukraine
- Style: modernist; neo-Romantic
- Awards: Shevchenko National Prize

Yuliy Serhiyovych Meitus (Ukrainian: Юлій Сергійович Мейтус; 28 January 1903 – 2 April 1997, Kyiv), was a Soviet and Ukrainian composer, considered the founder of the Ukrainian Soviet opera. His early style was modernistic, later he used more traditional neo-Romantic idioms.

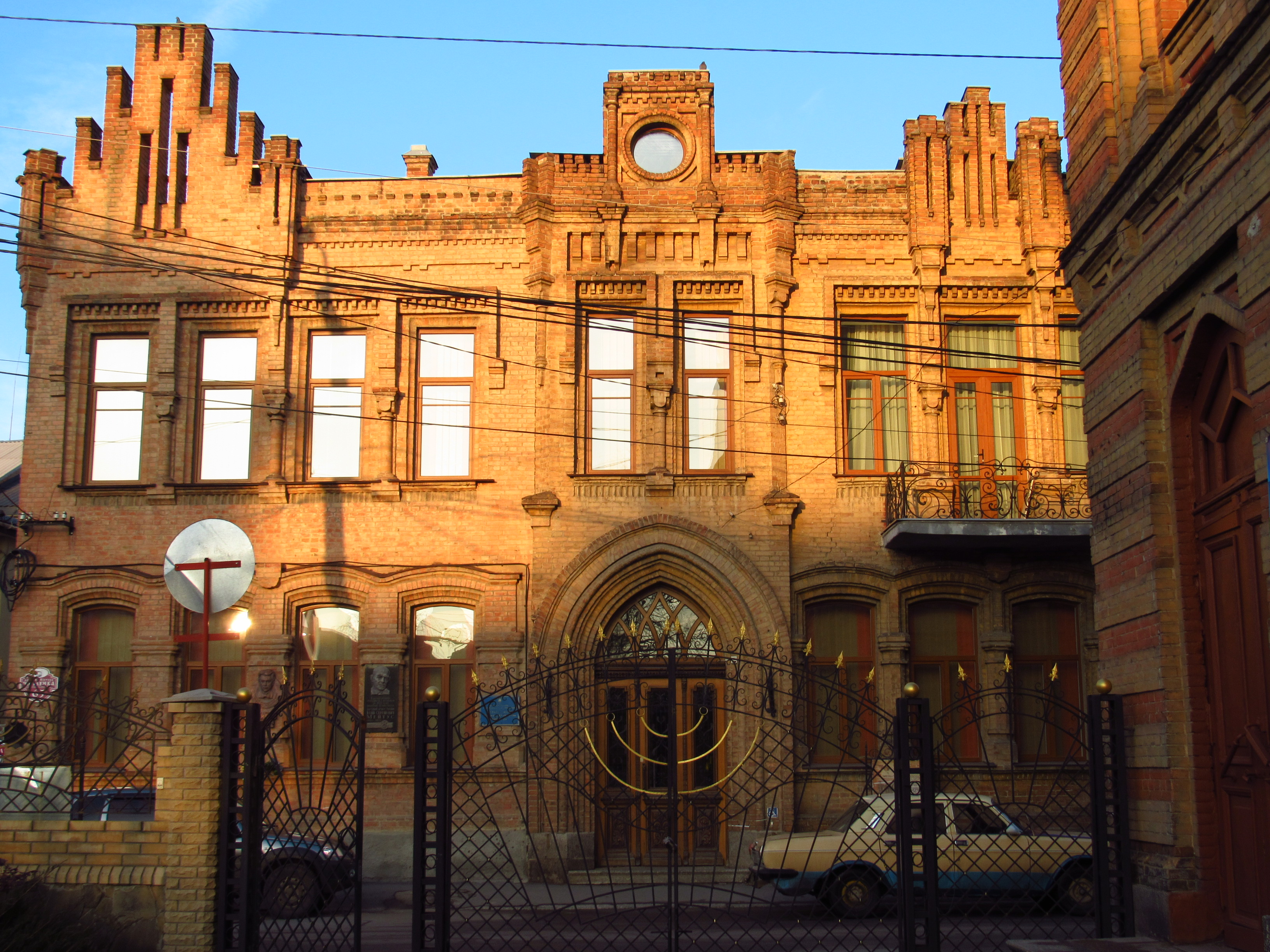
House, where Yuliy Meytus was born

Meitus was born in Yelysavethrad to a Jewish family. In 1919 he graduated from the School of Music in piano from Heinrich Neuhaus, and from the Kharkiv Institute of Music and Drama in the composition class of C. Bogatyrenko in 1931. During World War II he was evacuated to the Turkmen SSR. Meitus made his debut in film in 1932. He is famous for his 18 operas, a number of orchestral works and about 300 songs on Ukrainian and Russian classical poems, among them Stolen Happiness, the epic Yaroslav the Wise, Daughter of the Wind, Leila and Majnun, The Young Guard and Abakan. He was buried in the Baikove Cemetery.

== Awards and honors ==
- Honored Art Worker of the Turkmen SSR (1944)
- Honored Art Worker of the Ukrainian SSR (1948)
- Stalin Prize, 2nd class (1951)
- Two Orders of the Red Banner of Labour (1960, 1971)
- People's Artist of the Ukrainian SSR (1973)
- Order of Friendship of Peoples (1983)
- Shevchenko National Prize (1991)
- Medal "For Labour Valour"
