= Ina Konstantinova =

Soviet partisan

Inessa (Ina) Alexandrovna Konstantinova (Russian: Инесса (Ина) Александровна Константинова; 1924–1944) was a wartime Soviet diarist and partisan, killed as a 20-year-old during Nazi Germany's operations in the Soviet Union during World War II in 1944.

== Biography ==
Born in the village of Kiverichi in Tver Oblast in 1924, Ina Konstantinova grew up near the northeastern Russian town of Kashin with her parents and sister. She was a sixteen-year-old Komsomol member and student at the beginning of the Nazi German invasion of the Soviet Union in 1941.

Still too young to fight in the military in the first days of the attack in the summer of 1941, Konstantinova joined a voluntary aid detachment and helped assist wounded people with the district committee of the Red Cross.

Secretly leaving her parents' home at age 17 and proceeding towards Moscow to join the partisans as a saboteur, Konstantinova joined the 2nd Kalinin Partisan Brigade of the 1st Kalinin Partisan Corps in July 1942. Working among the partisans a reconnaissance scout for the brigade for the remaining years of her life during, Konstaninova would be sent behind enemy lines several times. She was awarded the Medal "Partisan of the Patriotic War" 2nd class in 1943.

Konstantinova perished on 4 March 1944, when, covering the retreat of her comrades away from an ambushed dugout in the course of a partisan reconnaissance operation with her submachine gun firing, she was killed in a skirmish with an advancing German unit near the village of Lukyanovo (present-day Pskov Oblast). Her corpse was located under a pine tree close to the scene the following day.

Throughout the war, Konstantinova maintained a diary she had started as a teenager prior to the invasion. Her diary entries and letters were posthumously published in the Russian language in 1947 and subsequently translated into various languages for publication outside the Soviet Union. Her remains were reburied in the town of Kashin in 1949, where a street was also named after her in 1970.
