= Chelyabinsk Opera and Ballet Theatre =

Opera house in Chelyabinsk, Russia

Coordinates: 55°09′59.57″N 61°24′06.25″E

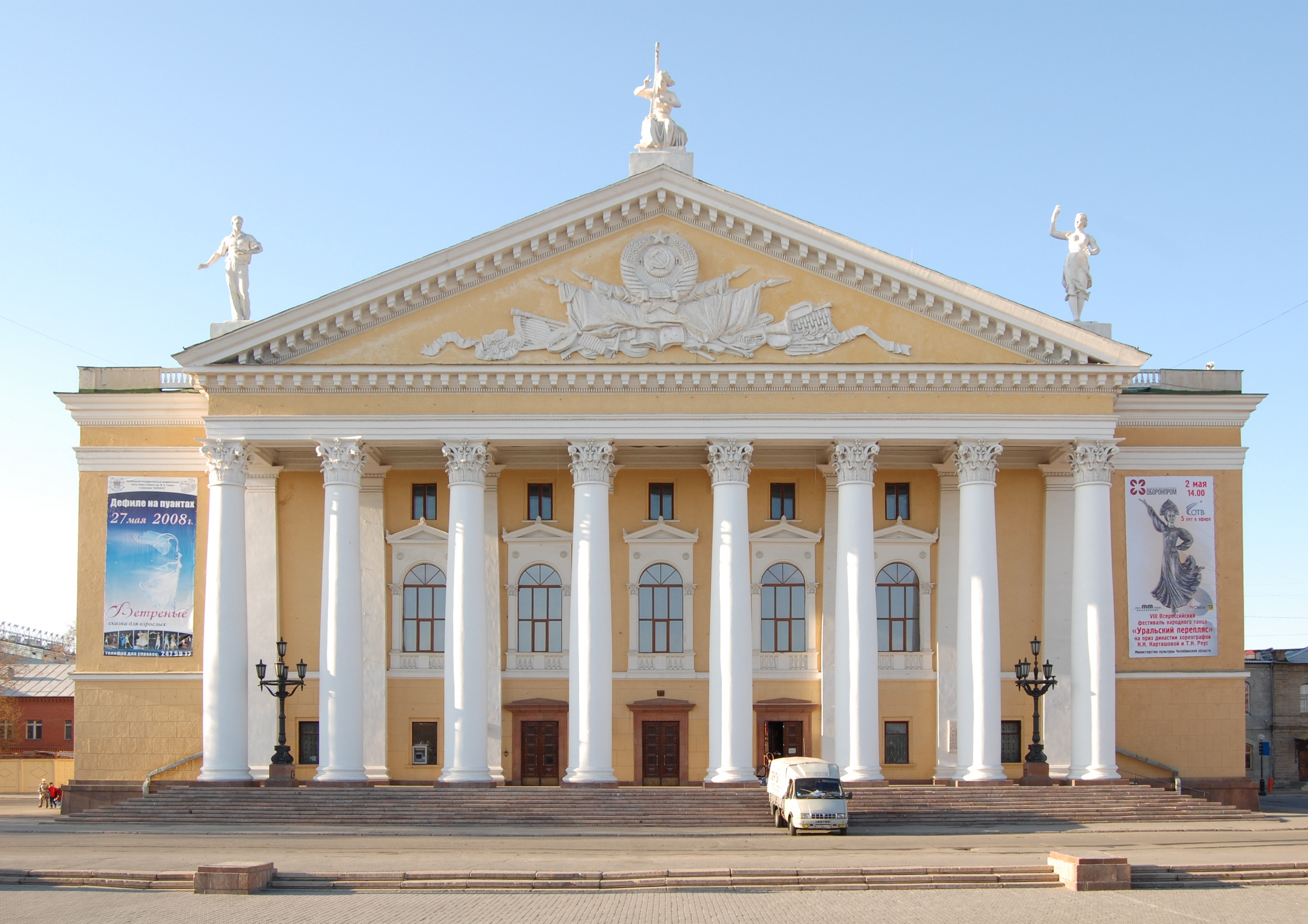
Chelyabinsk Opera and Ballet Theatre

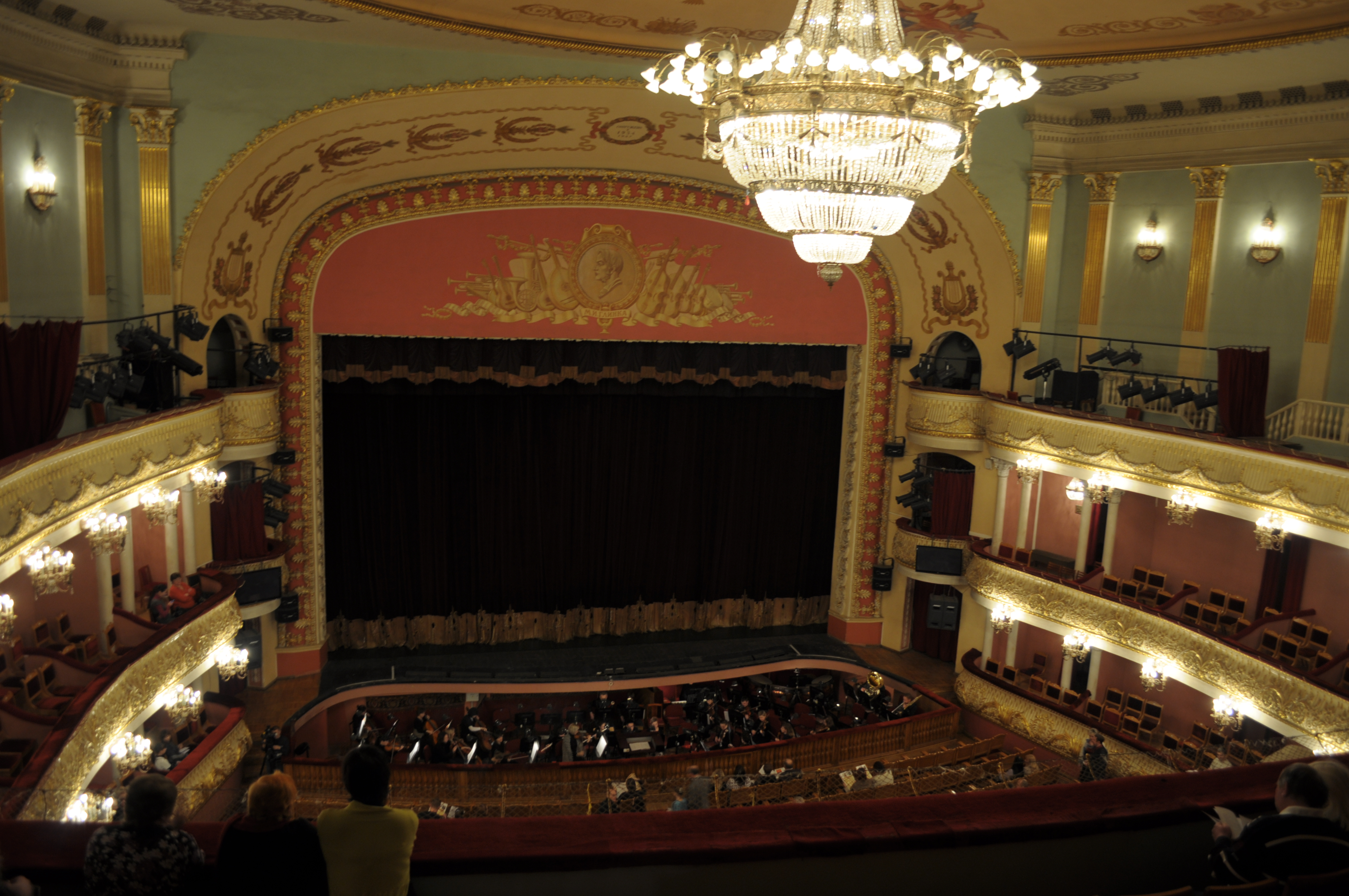
Theatre interior

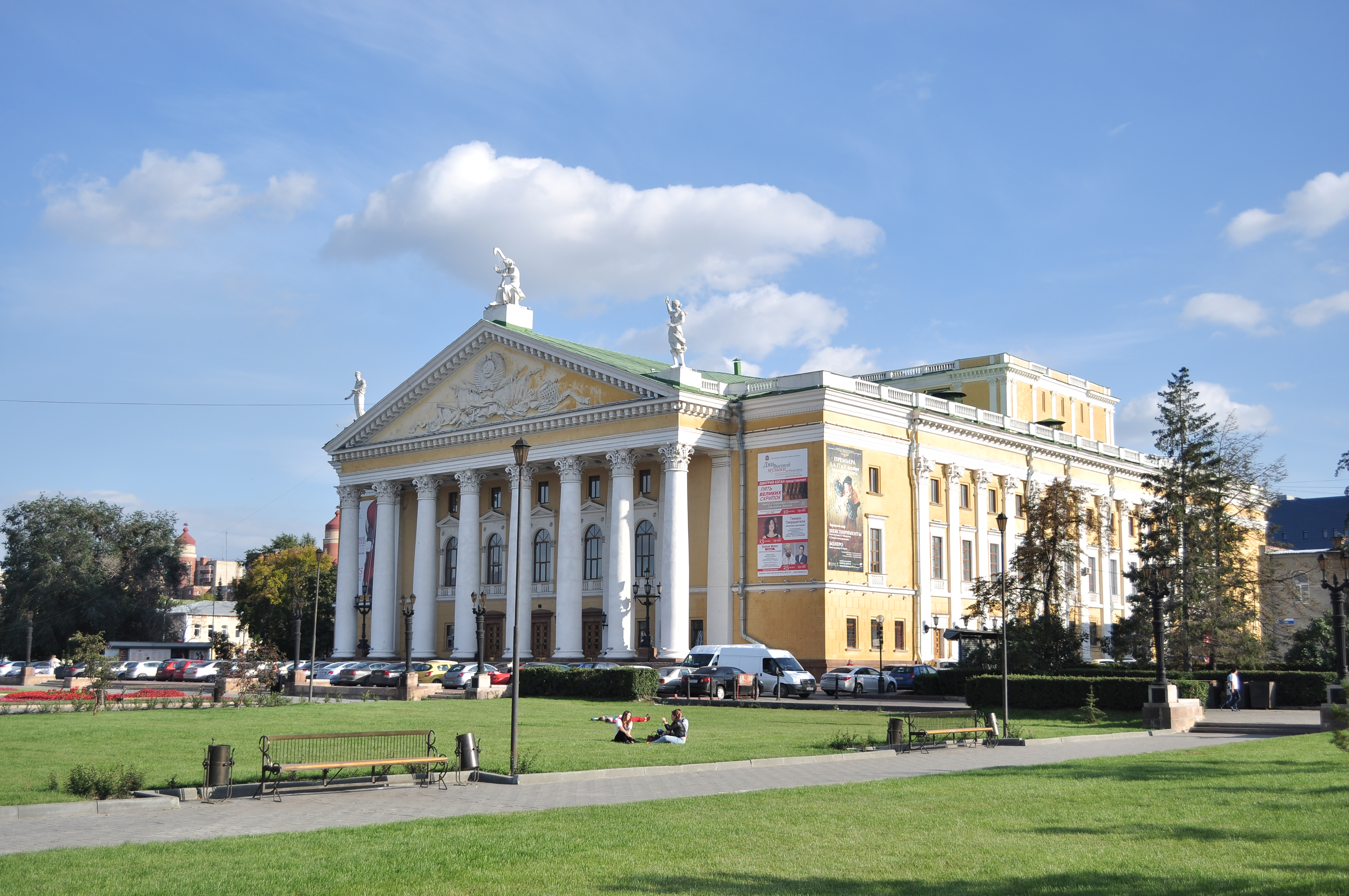
Chelyabinsk Glinka Theatre

The Chelyabinsk State Academic Opera and Ballet Theatre or Glinka State Academic Opera and Ballet Theatre (Russian: Челябинский театр оперы и балета имени М. И. Глинки), named after Mikhail Glinka, is an opera and ballet theatre on one of the main squares of Chelyabinsk, Russia. The capacity of the hall is 894 seats. It is the largest theatre in the Chelyabinsk Region.

== History ==
The theatre was designed by architect N. Kurennoy and built in 1936–55 on the site of the former Nativity Cathedral, which existed from 1748 to 1932. The theatre was originally planned to open on November 7, 1941, but the Great Patriotic War led to significant delays. The opening of the theatre eventually took place on September 29, 1956, with a production of Alexander Borodin's "Prince Igor".

== Principal conductors ==
- 1955-1968 - Isidor Zak
- 1980-1985 - Nariman Chunikhin
- 1987-1991 - Viktor Sobolev
- 1994-2007 - Sergey Ferulev
- 2007-2013 - Anton Grishanin
- 2013 - present — Evgeny Volynsky
