= Krasnodon Raion =

Former subdivision of Luhansk Oblast, Ukraine

Krasnodon Raion Краснодонський район
- Raion
- Sorokyne Raion
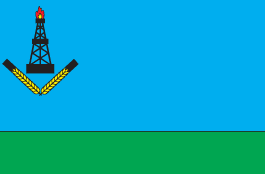
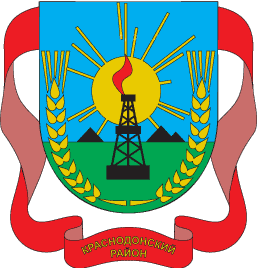
- Flag Coat of arms

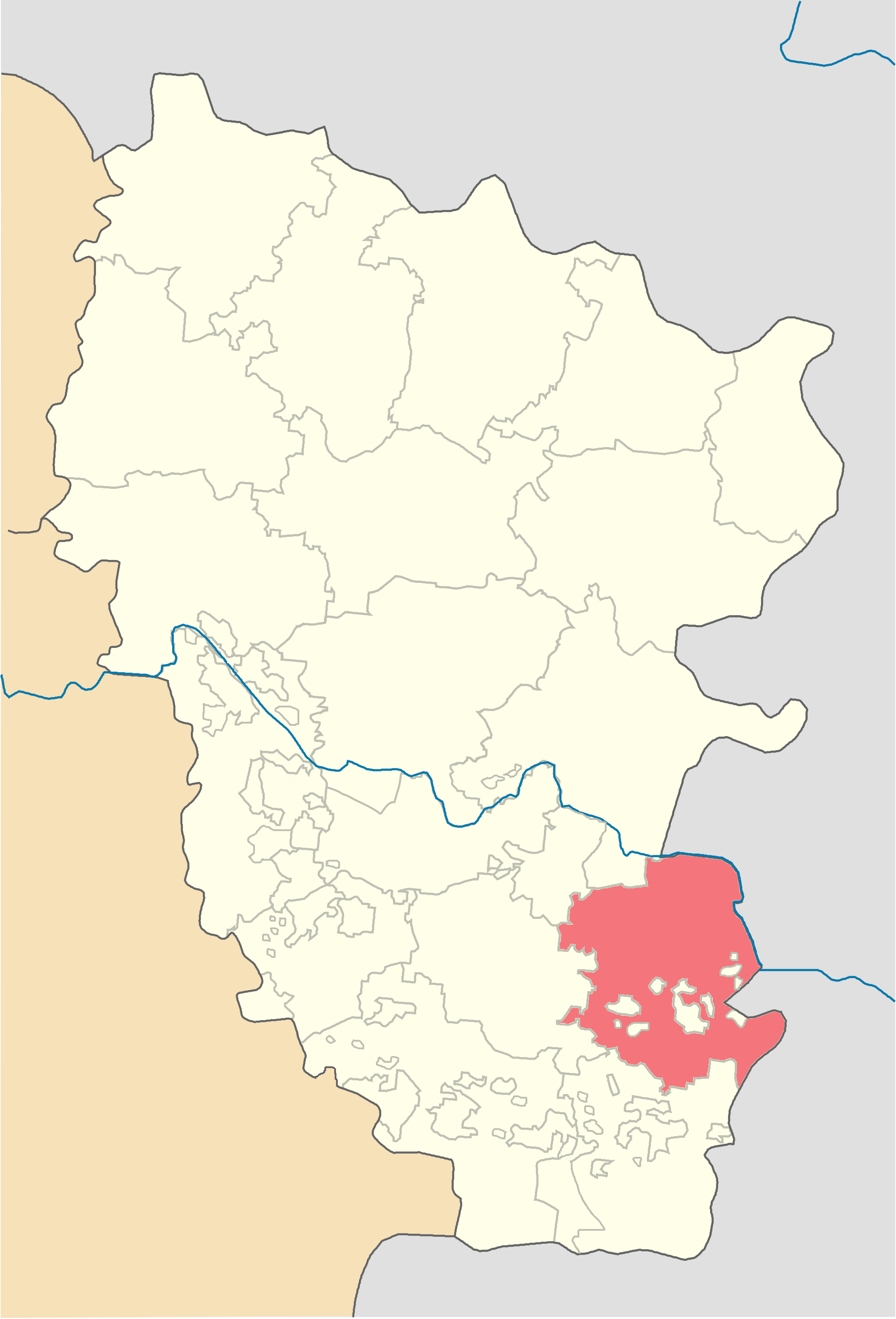
- Coordinates: 48°22′51″N 39°40′36″E
- Country: Ukraine
- Region: Luhansk Oblast
- Established: 1923
- Disestablished: 18 July 2020
- Admin. center: Krasnodon
- Subdivisions: List: 0 — city councils; 5 — settlement councils; 10 — rural councils; Number of localities: 0 — cities; 5 — urban-type settlements; 47 — villages; — rural settlements

Government
  - Governor: Oleksandr Kravtsov

Area
  - Total: 100 km^{2} (39 sq mi)

Population (2020)
  - Total: 28,943 ▼
  - Density: 290/km^{2} (750/sq mi)
- Time zone: UTC+02:00 (EET)
  - Summer (DST): UTC+03:00 (EEST)
- Postal index: 94415—94493
- Area code: +380 6462
- Website: http://kd.loga.gov.ua/

Krasnodon Municipal District Краснодонский муниципальный округ (Russian)
- District

Other transcription(s)
  - Ukrainian: Краснодонський район
- Flag Coat of arms

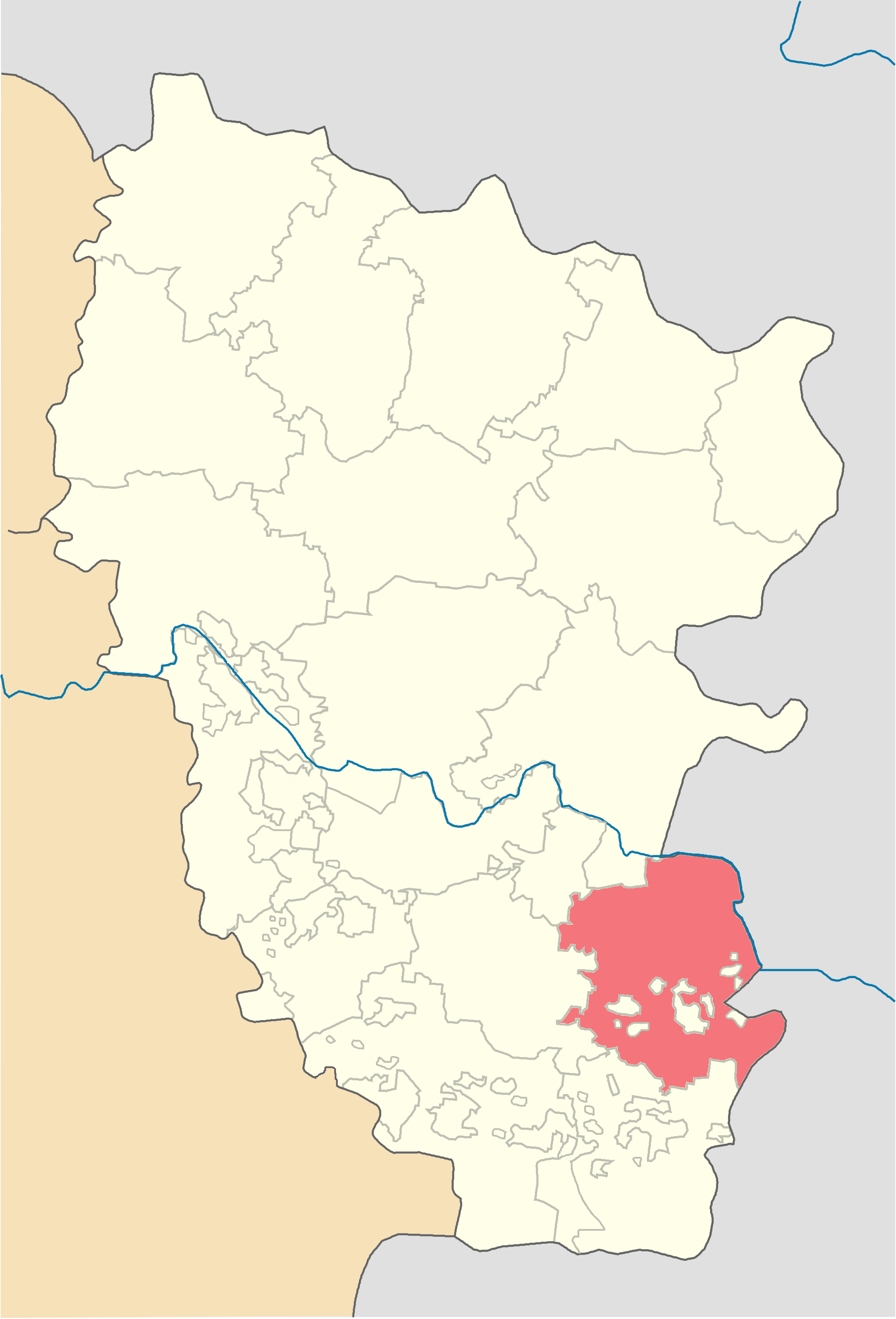
- Location of Krasnodon District in the Luhansk People's Republic
- Coordinates: 48°22′51″N 39°40′36″E
- Country: Russia
- Federal subject: Luhansk People's Republic
- Established: 1923
- Administrative center: Krasnodon

Area
  - Total: 100 km^{2} (39 sq mi)
- Website: https://krasnodon-adm.ru

Krasnodon Raion (Ukrainian: Краснодонський район; Russian: Краснодонский район) or Sorokyne Raion (Ukrainian: Сорокинський район; Russian: Сорокинский район) was a raion (district) in Luhansk Oblast, Ukraine from 1923 to 2020 and the de-facto district of the Luhansk People's Republic, a federal subject of Russia. The administrative center of the raion was Krasnodon, also known as Sorokyne. The last estimate of the raion population before its abolition by the Ukrainian government in 2020 was 28,943 (2020 est.). Under the de facto Russian administration, the territory of the former raion, along with the city of Krasnodon, was reorganized into the Krasnodon Municipal Okrug.

== History ==
It was originally formed in 1923 as Sorokyne Raion. It was subordinate to Shakhty Okruha of Donets Governorate of the Ukrainian Soviet Socialist Republic. On August 12, 1927, it received the status of a national raion for ethnic Russians. At the time, it had a population of 13,216 people, of whom 80.5% were ethnic Russians. In 1930, it was assigned to Luhansk Okruha. From September 1930 to 1932, it was subordinated directly to the republic. In 1932, it was assigned to Donetsk Oblast. By this time, it was still considered a national raion. In June 1938, it was transferred to Voroshylovhrad Oblast (later renamed Luhansk Oblast). At some point, it was renamed Krasnodon Raion.

Since 2014, Krasnodon Raion has been controlled by forces of the Luhansk People's Republic (LPR). Initially, Krasnodon was incorporated as a city of oblast significance and did not belong to the raion, but in 2015, Ukraine officially merged it into the raion. In 2016, the Verkhovna Rada renamed Krasnodon Raion to Sorokyne Raion, implementing the law prohibiting names of Communist origin.

Sorokyne Raion was abolished by Ukraine on 18 July 2020 as part of the administrative reform of Ukraine, which reduced the number of raions of Luhansk Oblast to eight. The LPR continued using the raion - under the name "Krasnodon Raion" - as an administrative unit after that point, and following the 2022 annexation referendums in Russian-occupied Ukraine, Russia has done the same.

== Demographics ==
As of the Ukrainian Census of 2001:

Ethnicity

- Russian: 51.7%
- Ukrainian: 45.9%
- Belarusians: 0.9%

Language

- Russian 68.8%
- Ukrainian 30.0%
- Armenian 0.1%
- Belarusian 0.1%
