= Young Guard (Die Erste Wache!) =

Song
- Language: English and German
- Published: 1909
- Songwriter(s): Harry Appel

Young Guard (Die Erste Wache!) is a musical score written for piano composed by Harry Appel. The score was first published in 1909 by Seminary Music Co. in New York, NY. The sheet music cover, designed by Frew, features a photo of a small boy with a stick in Prussian helmet standing guard. The score is dedicated to Prinz Wilhelm Von Preussen.

The sheet music can be found at the Pritzker Military Museum & Library.
