= Ivan Banov =

Ivan Nikolayevich Banov
- Born: 29 August 1916; Tatsinskaya, Don Host Oblast, Russian Empire (now in Rostov Oblast, Russian Federation)
- Died: 9 February 1982 (aged 65); Moscow, Russian SFSR; Soviet Union
- Military career
- Allegiance: Soviet Union
- Branch: Red Army / Soviet Army
- Service years: 1935–1977
- Rank: Major-general
- Nicknames: "Chyorny", "Ivan Chyorny"
- Conflicts: World War II
- Awards: Hero of the Soviet Union; Order of Lenin (2); Order of the Red Banner; Order of the Red Star; Other awards

Ivan Nikolayevich Banov (Russian: Ива́н Никола́евич Ба́нов; 29 August 1916 [O.S. 16 August], Tatsinskaya stanitsa – 9 February 1982, Moscow) was a Soviet military intelligence officer and partisan movement leader in World War II.

== Biography ==
Ivan Banov was born on 29 August 1916 [O.S. 16 August] in the stanitsa of Tatsinskaya in the Don Host Oblast of the Russian Empire (now in Rostov Oblast, Russian Federation). He entered the Red Army in 1935 and joined the Communist Party in 1939.

An officer in the Red Army's military intelligence at the time of the German invasion of the Soviet Union in 1941, Banov organized several partisan groups behind the German lines that grew to become sizeable formations during the Nazi occupation.

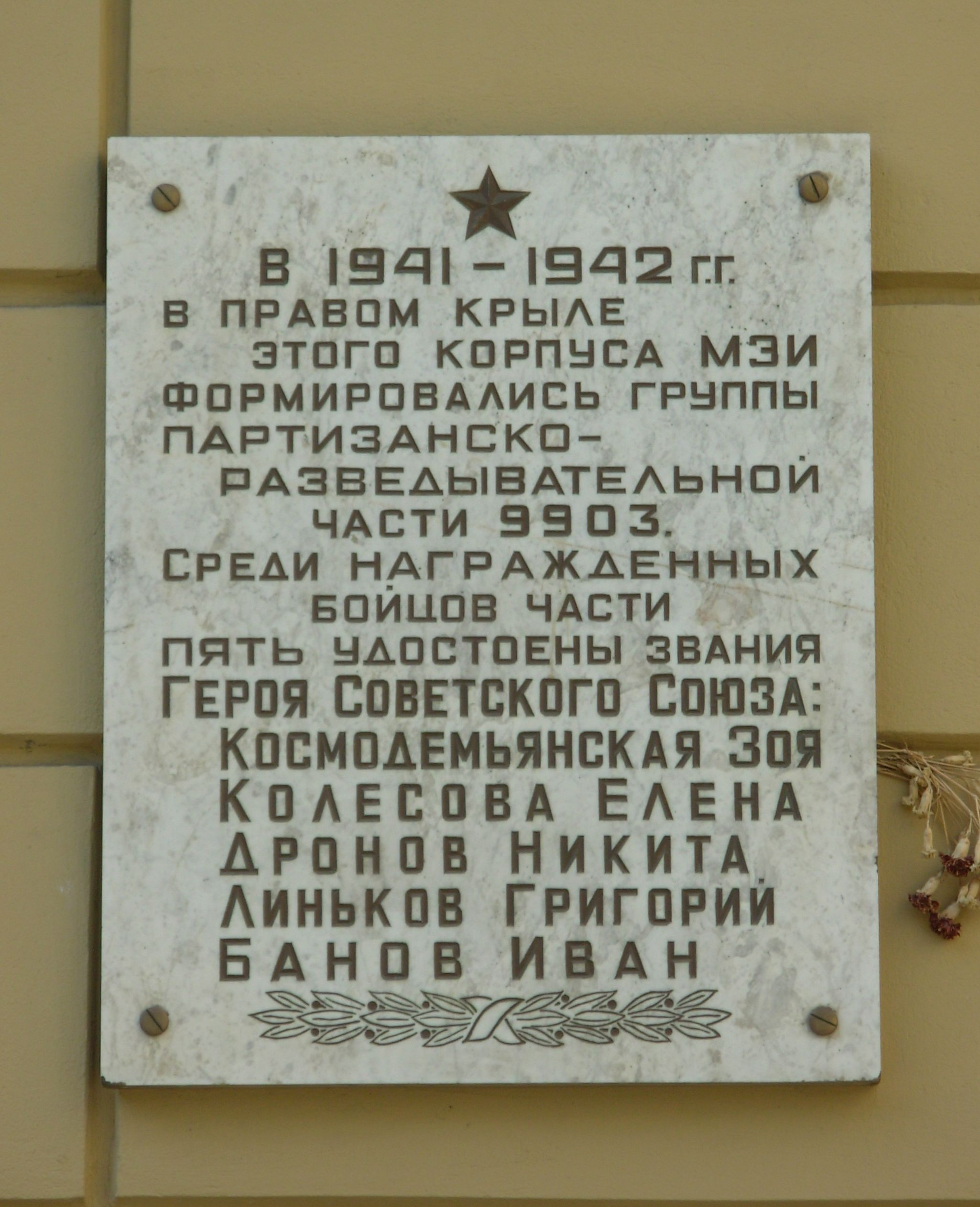
Commemorative plaque about partisan groups

Ivan Banov's partisan fighters carried out significant raids on the occupying German forces and facilitated the Red Army's liberation of the German-occupied territory of the Soviet Union in 1942-1944. Credited with disrupting the enemy supply lines, detonating twenty railroad bridges, and accumulating valuable intelligence material, Banov was recognized with the honorary title of Hero of the Soviet Union in 1944.

He graduated from Frunze Military Academy in 1949 and was promoted in rank to major-general during his post-war service. Banov retired from the military in 1977.

He lived in Moscow and died on 9 February 1982.

== Awards ==
Banov's decorations included both Soviet and foreign military awards, they include:

- Gold Star of the Hero of the Soviet Union,
- two Orders of Lenin,
- Order of the Red Banner,
- Order of the Red Star.
- Order for Service to the Homeland in the Armed Forces of the USSR, 3rd class,
- Medal "Partisan of the Patriotic War" 1st class,
- Medal "For the Victory over Germany in the Great Patriotic War 1941–1945",
- Jubilee Medal "Twenty Years of Victory in the Great Patriotic War 1941-1945", and,
- Jubilee Medal "Thirty Years of Victory in the Great Patriotic War 1941-1945".
