= The Children's Friend (Soviet magazine) =

The Children's Friend (Russian: Дружные ребята) was a Soviet pocket-format bi-weekly magazine for rural children. It was published in Moscow from 1927 to 1953 as an organ of the Young Pioneers youth organization and also of the Komsomol (Communist Youth League).

From the late 1930s, and especially after 1945, the magazine mostly became a copy of Pioneer and was eventually merged with it.

The magazine was titled The Children's Friend in 1927 – 1931 and again in 1938 – 1953; in 1932 it was titled Collective Farm Children's Magazine (Russian: Журнал колхозных ребят) and in 1933 – 1937 Collective Farm Child (Russian: Колхозные ребята).

Artists included Lev Bruni, D. Gorlov, and Vladimir Suteev. The main authors, who were mostly themselves from rural backgrounds, included Theodore Vasyunin, Pyotr Zamoyski, Alexander Kozhevnikov, and Nikolai Bogdanov. The editorial board included Leonid Panteleev, who contributed stories himself and edited the magazine's "Golden Key" section.
