= Lyubov Shevtsova =

Soviet partisan (1924–1943)

Lyubov Grigorievna Shevtsova
- Любовь Григорьевна Шевцова
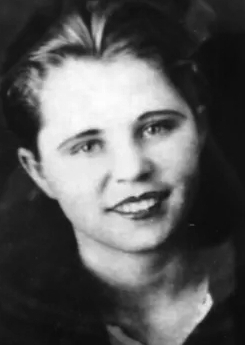
- Born: 24 September 1924; Soviet Union, Izvaryne, Krasnodon District, Ukrainian SSR
- Died: 8 February 1943 (aged 18); Soviet Union, Rovenky, Voroshilovgrad, Ukrainian SSR
- Cause of death: Execution by shooting
- Awards: Hero of the Soviet Union; Order of Lenin

Lyubov Shevtsova (Russian: Любовь Шевцова; 8 September 1924 – 9 February 1943) was a Soviet partisan and a member of the Young Guard, an underground anti-Nazi organization in Krasnodon during World War II.

== Early life ==
Shevtsova was born in Izvaryne, Krasnodon District in 24 September 1924 to a working-class Russian family. Her father had fought in the First World War and the Russian Civil War on the side of the Red Army; her mother worked at a field hospital as a nurse. Her family moved within the limits of Krasnodon city in 1927, where she graduated from the seventh grades of school before applying to a theater school in Rostov. However, the German invasion of the Soviet Union began shortly after she applied.

== Partisan activities ==
Shortly after the start of the war Shevtsova attended brief nursing classes and tried to enlist as a nurse in the Red Army, but was rejected for being too young at the time. So she joined the Komsomol in February 1942 and upon the recommendation of the Voroshilovgrad District Committee she began training to become a radio operator for the Young Guard in April. After completing the course and swearing an oath of allegiance she began transmitting information collected by the partisans to the Red Army Intelligence Center.

She also participated in spreading leaflets, helped Soviet prisoners of war hide from the Germans, and participated in burning down the Labour Exchange building, which contained documents with the names of people that were to be deported and forced into hard labour for Germany. On 8 January 1943 Shevtsova was arrested as a wireless operator. The members of the Young Guard had been betrayed and all of them were arrested as well. The Gestapo tortured her to find out the transmission codes, apparently without success, and shot her on 9 February, at the age of 18 years.

== Recognition ==
On 13 September 1943, Shevtsova was posthumously declared a Hero of the Soviet Union. Young pioneer detachments, streets, and ships were named in her honor and memorials were dedicated to her memory.

== See also ==
- List of female Heroes of the Soviet Union
- Soviet partisans
- Young Guard
