= Young Guard (Soviet resistance) =

Anti-fascist group in occupied Krasnodon (1942–43)

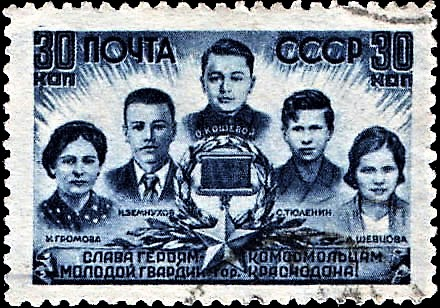
Young Guard (Soviet resistance)

The Young Guard (Russian: Молодая гвардия, romanized: Molodaya gvardiya; Ukrainian: Молода гвардія, romanized: Moloda hvardiya) was an underground anti-fascist Komsomol organization, in the German-occupied Soviet city of Krasnodon (Ukrainian SSR, now Luhansk Oblast of Ukraine). They were active during World War II, until January 1943. They carried out several acts of sabotage and protest before being destroyed by German forces. Most members of the Young Guard, about 80 people, were tortured and then executed by the Germans.

== History ==
The Young Guard was established soon after Krasnodon was occupied by Nazi Germany on 20 July 1942. Several youth groups amalgamated, calling themselves the Young Guard. One of the first meetings of the organization was held on 2 October the same year.

The organization was led by the local Communist Party underground of Krasnodon, headed by Filipp Lyutikov. Lyutikov was the former head of the parents' committee of the 4th secondary school of Krasnodon, where many members of the organization had studied. There is some controversy concerning the leadership of the Young Guard. It is widely accepted that the commander was Ivan Turkenich and the commissar was Oleg Koshevoy, but recent sources claim that the leaders were other members of the staff of the Young Guard, namely Viktor Tretyakevich, Sergey Tyulenin and Ivan Zemnukhov.

There were about 100 members of the Young Guard, all young boys and girls – workers, 8th–10th form schoolboys and schoolgirls from Krasnodon and surrounding villages and settlements. Due to the secret nature of the Young Guard, only people well known to other organization members, and who took the special oath of faithfulness, could become members. Most of them either belonged to the Komsomol or were accepted into Komsomol upon joining the Young Guard. 15 were members of the Communist Party of the Soviet Union. The most active members and founders of the organization made up the Staff of the Young Guard: Juliana Gromova, Oleg Koshevoy, Vasily Levashov, Lyubov Shevtsova, Viktor Tretyakevich, Ivan Turkenich, Sergey Tyulenin, and Ivan Zemnukhov.

=== Activities ===
Among the main activities of the organization were

- the release of 70 prisoners from the German concentration camp on 15 November 1942 (20 more people were released from the hospital of the camp)
- the burning of the German Labour Exchange of Krasnodon on 6 December 1942. A list of about 2,000 citizens of Krasnodon, who were intended for the deportation into Germany was burnt, thus saving them from deportation
- eight flags of the Soviet Union were hung out on highest buildings of Krasnodon on 6 and 7 November 1942 to commemorate the 25th anniversary of the October Revolution
- about 5,000 anti-fascist leaflets were issued and spread in Krasnodon during the existence of the organization

Members of the organization also destroyed motor vehicles, ammunition and enemy fuel supplies. Jointly with the Communist Party underground of Krasnodon the Young Guard prepared for an anti-fascist armed rebellion, but treachery within the organization and the betrayal to the Germans stopped these preparations.

=== Treachery and execution ===
The Germans knew about the existence of the underground and tried to discover its membership. Finally they succeeded in this, helped by treachery within the organization. Massive arrests began on 5 January 1943 and lasted until 11 January. Just 11 members managed to evade their pursuers. All the arrested people were tortured sexually. 71 of them (including its head Filipp Lyutikov) along with members of the Communist Party underground, many of them still alive, were thrown into the 53-meter deep pit of Coal Mine Number 5 on 15, 16, and 31 January 1943. Oleg Koshevoy, Lyubov Shevtsova, Viktor Subbotin, Dmitry Ogurtsov, Sergey Ostapenkov were shot on 9 February 1943 in the town park of the town Rovenky. Just five days later, on 14 February 1943 Krasnodon was liberated by the Red Army.

== Tributes ==
On 13 September 1943 five members of the Young Guard: Ulyana Gromova, Oleg Koshevoy, Lyubov Shevtsova, Sergey Tyulenin and Ivan Zemnukhov were awarded the title Hero of the Soviet Union posthumously, many other members were awarded various orders and medals.

Soviet writer Alexander Fadeyev wrote a bestselling book Molodaya Gvardiya (The Young Guard), in which he depicted the activities of the Young Guard. A film was made of this novel.

In Krasnodon the Monument to the Members of the Young Guard was erected in 1951-1954, the memorial complex Young Guard with the museum was built in 1970 and the monument Nepokoryonnye (Unsubdued in English) was erected near the Coal Mine Number 5 in 1982. The new town Molodogvardeysk in Luhansk Oblast of the Ukrainian SSR was named after the Young Guard in 1961. Many towns, settlements, streets of Soviet cities were also named after the organization and its members.

Russian inter-regional public organization the Young Guard was established in Voronezh in 1999.

== Skepticism ==
The official story of the group, including Fadeyev's book, has been questioned almost from the day that Krasnodon was liberated. Several researchers (both officially sanctioned and independent) revealed ambiguities and anomalies in the versions of the story promoted by Fadeyev, the groups survivors, and the Communist Party. Some survivors and witnesses declared they were pressed to follow the official version of events until the end of Soviet era.

The full true story of the Young Guard remains a mystery. For example, as of 2004 it is not known for certain who betrayed the Young Guard. The leadership of the organization, as mentioned above, has also been called into question.

A stamp was issued in 1944 honoring the leadership of the Young Guard, and featuring Ulyana Gromova, Ivan Zemnukhov, Oleg Koshevoy, Sergey Tyulenin, and Lyubov Shevtsova, all of whom were awarded Hero of the Soviet Union. The Pravda article referenced below, written in 2003, names the leadership as Koshevoy, Shevtsov, Ostapenko, Ogurtsov, and Subbotin. Only two of these names (Koshevoy and Shevstov, presumably Shevstova) correspond with the people named on the stamp.

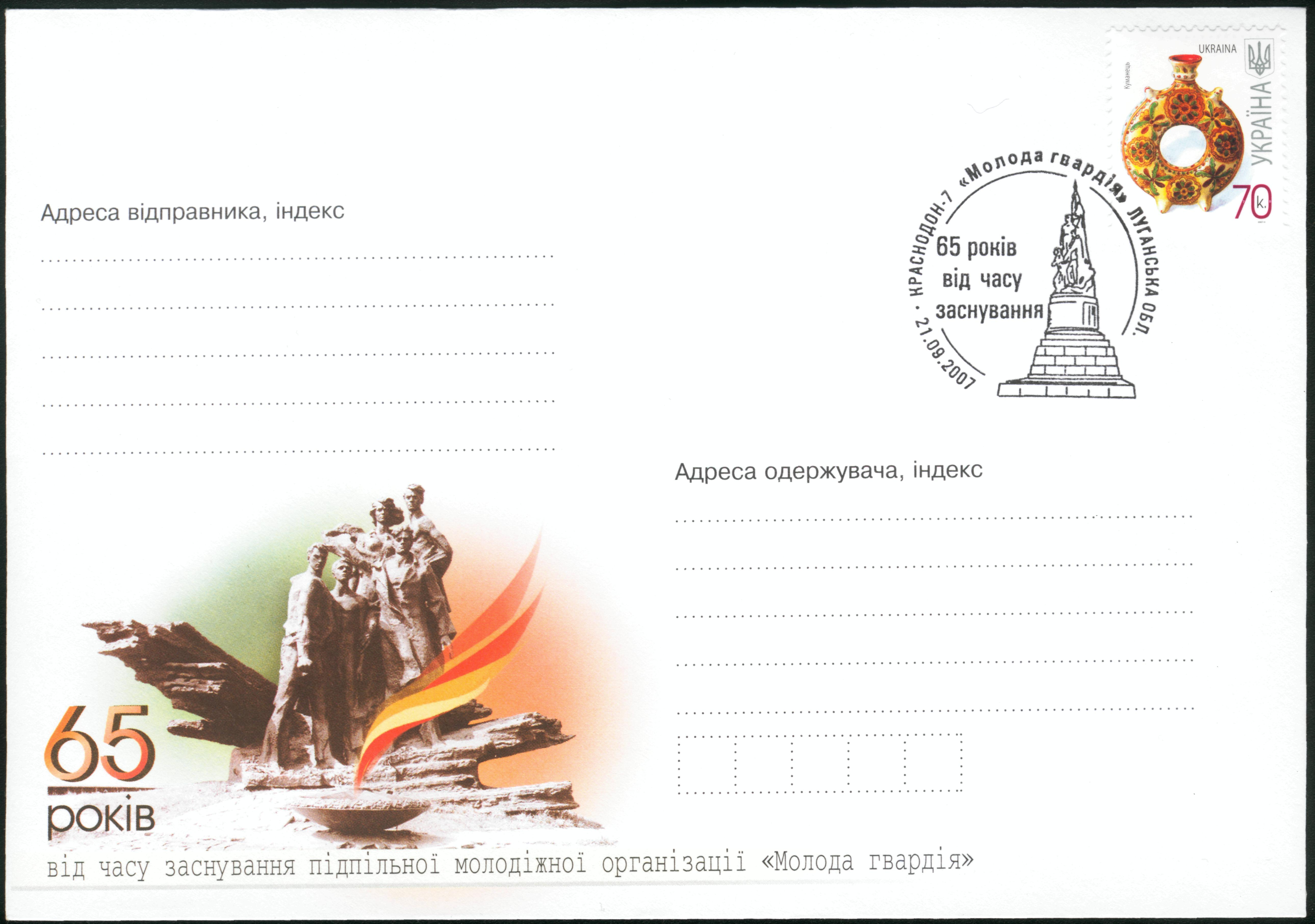
Ukrainian mailing envelope with a standard postage stamp commemorating the 65th anniversary of the Young Guard (21/09/2007)

== See also ==
- Soviet partisans

== Bibliography ==
- Fadeyev, Alexander, translators: David Sevirsky and Volet Dutt (2000). The Young Guard, University Press of the Pacific. ISBN 0-89875-129-2
- Rjabchikov Sergei V. The decipherment of a coded message by Lyuba Shevtsova, the Soviet scout and diversionist, great heroine, one of leaders of «Young Guard». I.I. Ivanovskaya and M.V. Posnova (eds.) Innovatsionnaya traektoriya razvitiya sovremennoy nauki. Sbornik statey II Mezhdunarodnoy nauchno-prakticheskoy konferentsii, sostoyavsheysya 19 dekabrya 2023 g. v g. Petrozavodske. Petrozavodsk: International Center for Scientific Partnership “New Science”, 2023, pp. 112-116.
