= Oleg Koshevoy =

Soviet political activist

- Born: 8 June 1926; Pryluky, Chernihiv Oblast, USSR
- Died: 9 February 1943 (aged 16); USSR
- Relatives: Yelena Koshevaya (mother)
- Military career
- Allegiance: Soviet Union
- Awards: Hero of the Soviet Union

Oleg Vasilyevich Koshevoy (Ukrainian: Олег Васильoвич Кошoвий, translit. Oleh Vasyl'ovych Koshovyi; Russian: Олег Васильевич Кошевой; 8 June 1926 – 9 February 1943) was a Soviet partisan and one of the founders of the clandestine organization Young Guard, which fought the Nazi forces in Krasnodon during World War II between 1941 and 1945.

Born in Pryluky, a city in the Chernihiv Oblast (province) of present-day north-central Ukraine (at the time a part of the Ukrainian Soviet Socialist Republic), Oleg Koshevoy's family moved south to Rzhyshchiv and Poltava before settling in Krasnodon (at the eastern border of Ukraine) in 1940, where he attended secondary school. In July 1942, Krasnodon was occupied by the German Army. Under the leadership of the party underground, Koshevoy organized an anti-nazi Komsomol (Communist Youth) organization called the Young Guard (Russian: Молодая гвардия, translit. Molodaya gvardiya), becoming its commissar. In January 1943, the Germans exposed the organization. Oleg Koshevoy tried to cross the front line, but was soon apprehended. He was tortured and then executed on 9 February 1943.

On 13 September 1943 Oleg Koshevoy was posthumously awarded the title of the Hero of the Soviet Union, the Order of Lenin, and later, the Medal "Partisan of the Patriotic War" 1st class. Many mines, sovkhozes, schools, and Young Pioneer groups in the Soviet Union were later named after him.
