= Krasnodon =

City in Luhansk Oblast, Ukraine

Krasnodon Сорокине (Ukrainian)
- City
- Краснодон (Russian)
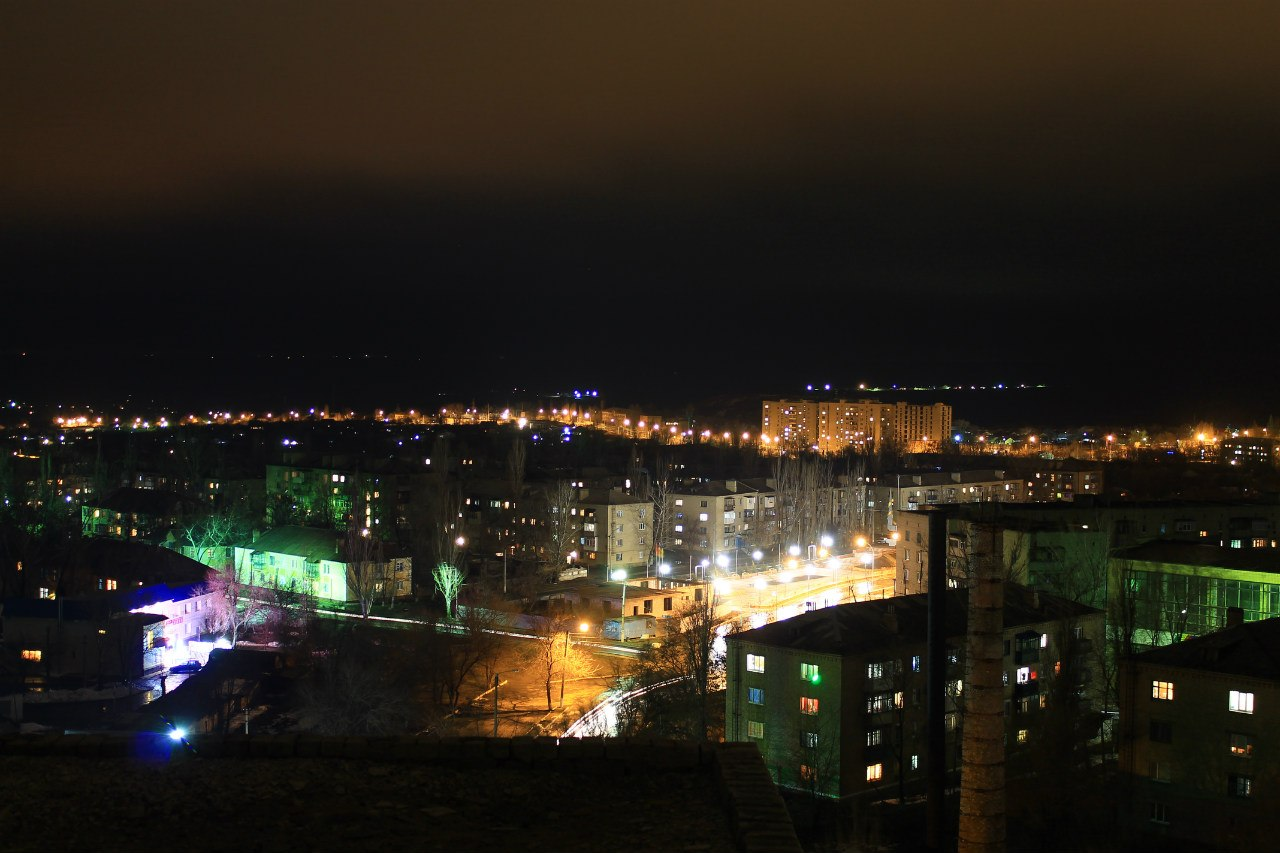
- Sorokyne skyline

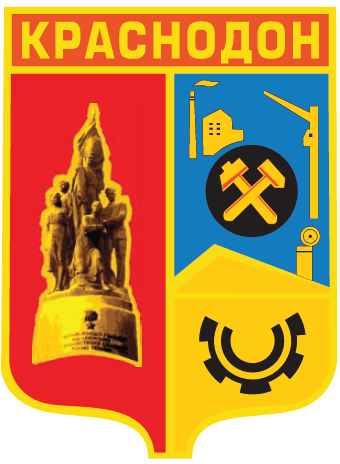
- Flag Coat of arms
- Interactive map of Krasnodon
- Location of Sorokyne/Krasnodon Krasnodon (Ukraine)
- Coordinates: 48°18′0″N 39°44′0″E
- Country: Ukraine
- Oblast: Luhansk Oblast (de jure); Lugansk People's Republic (de facto)
- Raion: Dovzhansk Raion (de jure); Krasnodon Municipal Okrug (de facto)
- Hromada: Sorokyne urban hromada (de jure); None (de facto)
- Founded: 1914 as Sorokino
- Renamed: 1938

Government
  - Mayor: Kozenko Sergey Pavlovich

Area
  - Total: 77.33 km^{2} (29.86 sq mi)

Population (2022)
  - Total: 42,315
  - Density: 547.2/km^{2} (1,417/sq mi)
- Postal code: 94400
- Area code(s): +380 6435 (Ukrainian) +7 959 (Russian / mobile)
- Climate: Dfa
- Website: krasnodon-r181.gosweb.gosuslugi.ru

Krasnodon (Ukrainian and Russian: Краснодон) or Sorokyne (Ukrainian: Сорокине; Russian: Сорокино, romanized: Sorokino) is a city in Dovzhansk Raion of Luhansk Oblast in eastern Ukraine. De jure, it is the seat of the Sorokyne urban hromada. Its population is approximately 42,315 (2022 estimate).

Krasnodon came under the control of pro-Russian forces in early 2014, and was incorporated into the Lugansk People's Republic. Since then, it has been continually controlled by the LNR, and since 2022, by Russia. Under the de facto administration, the city retains its name as Krasnodon and serves as the administrative center of the Krasnodon Municipal Okrug.

== History ==
=== 20th century ===
In the early 1910s, rich coal deposits were discovered in the area of the Donbas around modern Krasnodon. Entrepreneurs flocked to the area, and a number of coal mines were dug. A settlement began to grow along the left bank of the Velyka Kamianka, a tributary of the Donets River, known as Sorokyne. In 1914, the first coal was actually mined. This year is usually considered to be the official date of the founding of the settlement, Sorokyne. In 1916, 3,105 people lived in Sorokyne, and 776 miners worked at the mines.

During World War I and the Ukrainian War of Independence, Sorokyne changed hands several times. The intense fighting destroyed the mines and most of the settlement. Eventually, it was captured by the Bolsheviks in December 1919. Afterwards it was administratively part of the Donets Governorate of Ukraine.

The Soviet regime restored and modernized the destroyed mines, and began construction on new mines. A local newspaper has been published in the city since September 1930. Sorokyne became a major center of coal mining in the Donbas. On 28 October 1938, by a decision of the Presidium of the Supreme Soviet of the Ukrainian Soviet Socialist Republic, the mining settlement of Sorokyne was renamed to Krasnodon and given city status. By 1939, 22,220 people lived in Krasnodon.

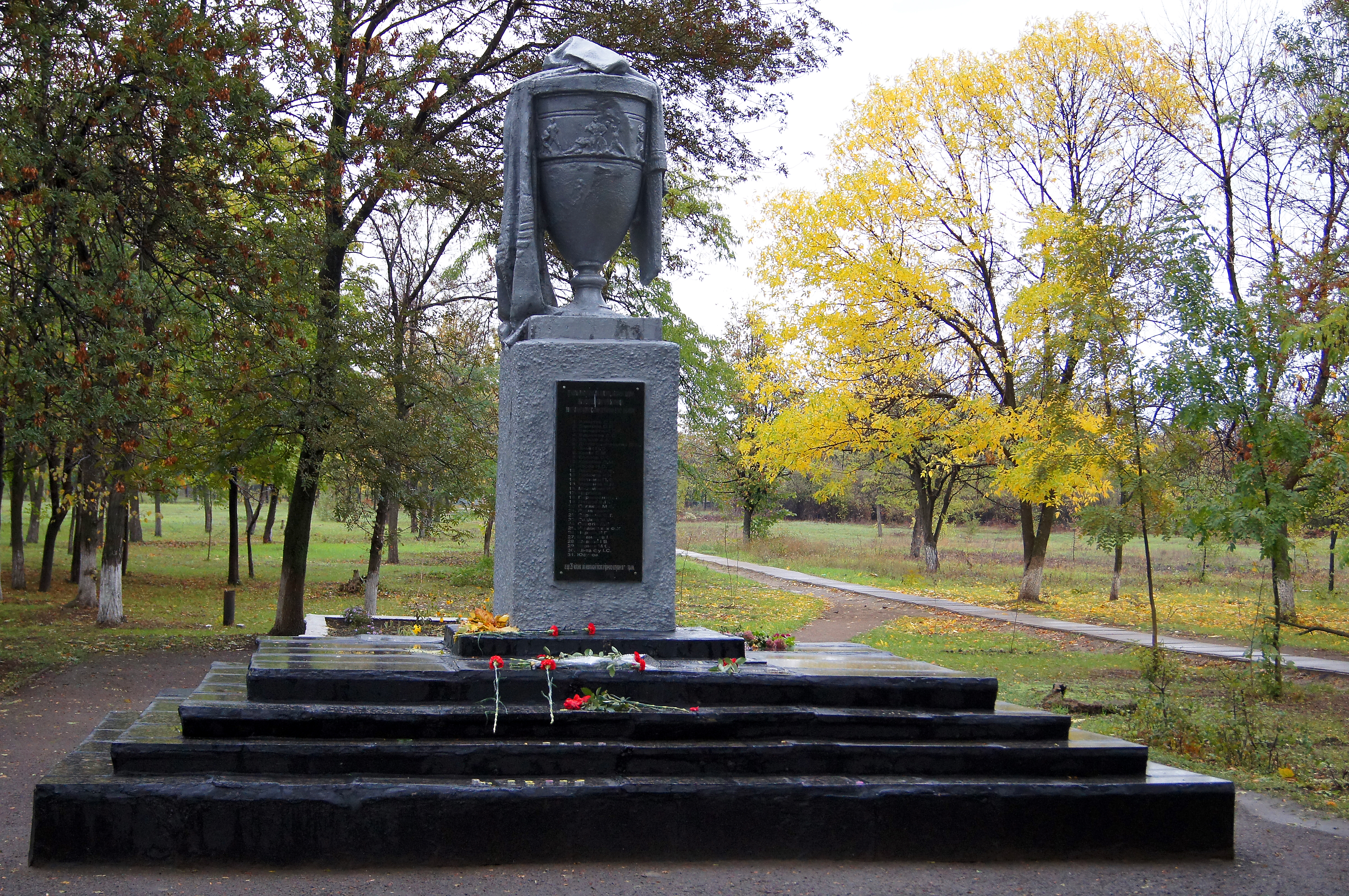
Mass grave of victims of Nazi Germany

During World War II, Krasnodon was occupied by Nazi Germany from 20 July 1942 to 14 February 1943. The Germans operated a Nazi prison in the town. The Soviet resistance organization Young Guard operated in the city during the occupation. The Nazis would capture the Young Guardsmen and murder them by throwing them down mineshafts. Fifty-eight guardsmen in total are known to have been killed. After the end of the war, Young Guard have been commemorated with monuments and a memorial complex in Krasnodon. On 27 September 1942, according to Soviet sources, the Nazis committed a particularly brutal massacre by burying alive 32 patriotic Soviet miners in the city park. The Nazis also attempted to use the coal mines of Krasnodon, bringing in machines to harvest its natural resources.

After the liberation of the city by the Red Army, the mines were once again reconstructed.

=== 21st century ===
Since 2014, Krasnodon has been controlled by the breakaway Lugansk People's Republic (LNR), and not by the Ukrainian authorities. NATO released satellite data from 21 August 2014 and confirmed it showed a large column of armoured vehicles crossing into Ukraine from Russia through Krasnodon.

In 2016, the city was renamed Sorokyne by Ukraine as part of decommunization reforms. However, the name change was largely symbolic due to Ukraine not controlling the city. Since 2022, Russia has claimed the city as part of the LNR, a federal subject of Russia, following the annexation of the region.

In February 2023, LNR Head Leonid Pasechnik and Russian-installed mayor of Sorokyne Sergey Kozenko, and head of Krasnoyarsk Vladislav Loginov signed an agreement establishing Krasnodon and Krasnoyarsk as sister cities. Pasechnik said that the relationship will include "youth exchanges, infrastructure restoration, urban development, and sports development". Analysts see this as part of "wider government initiatives to erase Ukrainian identity among youth". The "youth exchanges" may be related to Russia's youth camps, in which Ukrainian children are allegedly "indoctrinate[d] with Russian political ideology". On 25 September 2023, it was reported by both Ukrainian and Russian military sources that Ukrainian forces struck industrial facilities in Sorokyne.

== Economy ==
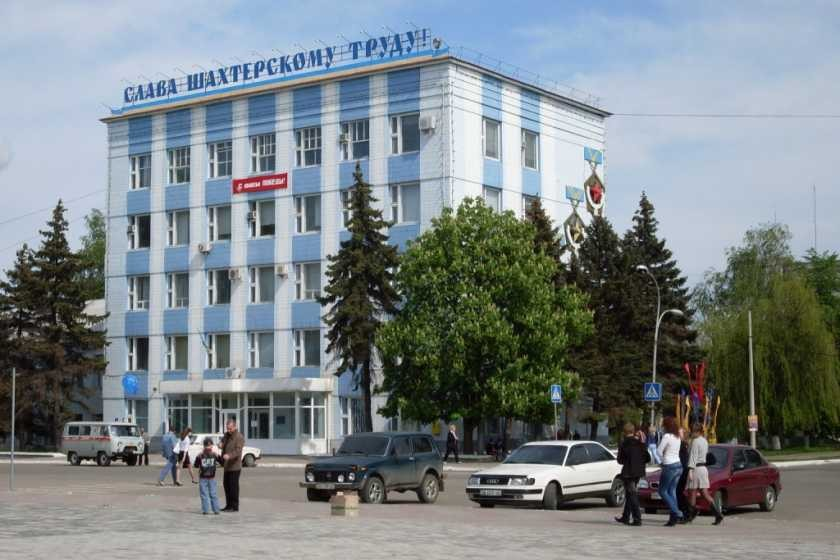
Krasnodon Coal Company

Krasnodon has historically been important for the mining of bituminous coal. There is also a meat processing plant and a sewing factory today.

== Demographics ==
The population of Krasnodon was 70,400 in 1972, 53,000 in 1989, and 49,921 in 2001.

As of the Ukrainian Census of 2001, the city was majority (66.3%) Russians, with a large minority (33.2%) of Ukrainians and small minorities of Belarusians (1.3%) and other ethnic groups (2.2%).

Linguistically, the city is overwhelmingly Russophone, with 90.75% natively speaking the Russian language. The largest linguistic minority are native Ukrainian speakers, who make up 8.46% of the population. There are then several small linguistic minorities, with 0.17% natively speaking Romani, 0.15% speaking Armenian, and 0.12 speaking Belarusian.

== Gallery ==
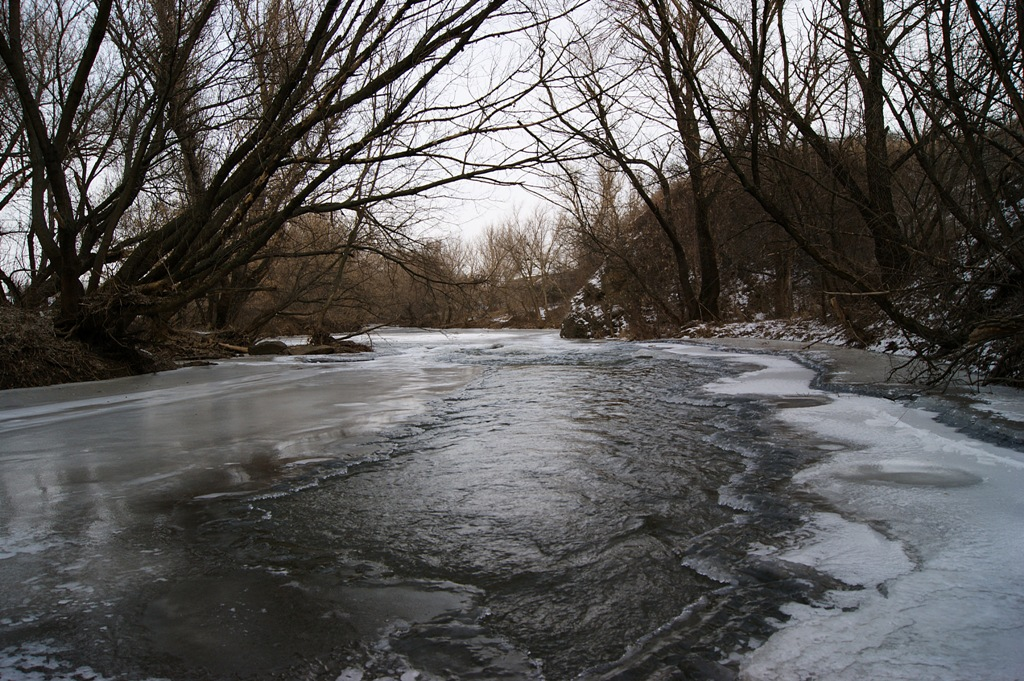
Velyka Kamyanka River in Krasnodon

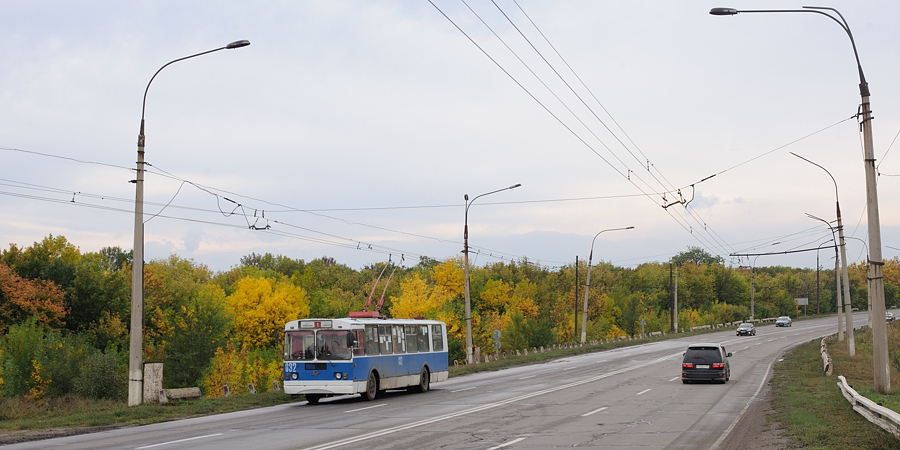
A trolleybus in Krasnodon

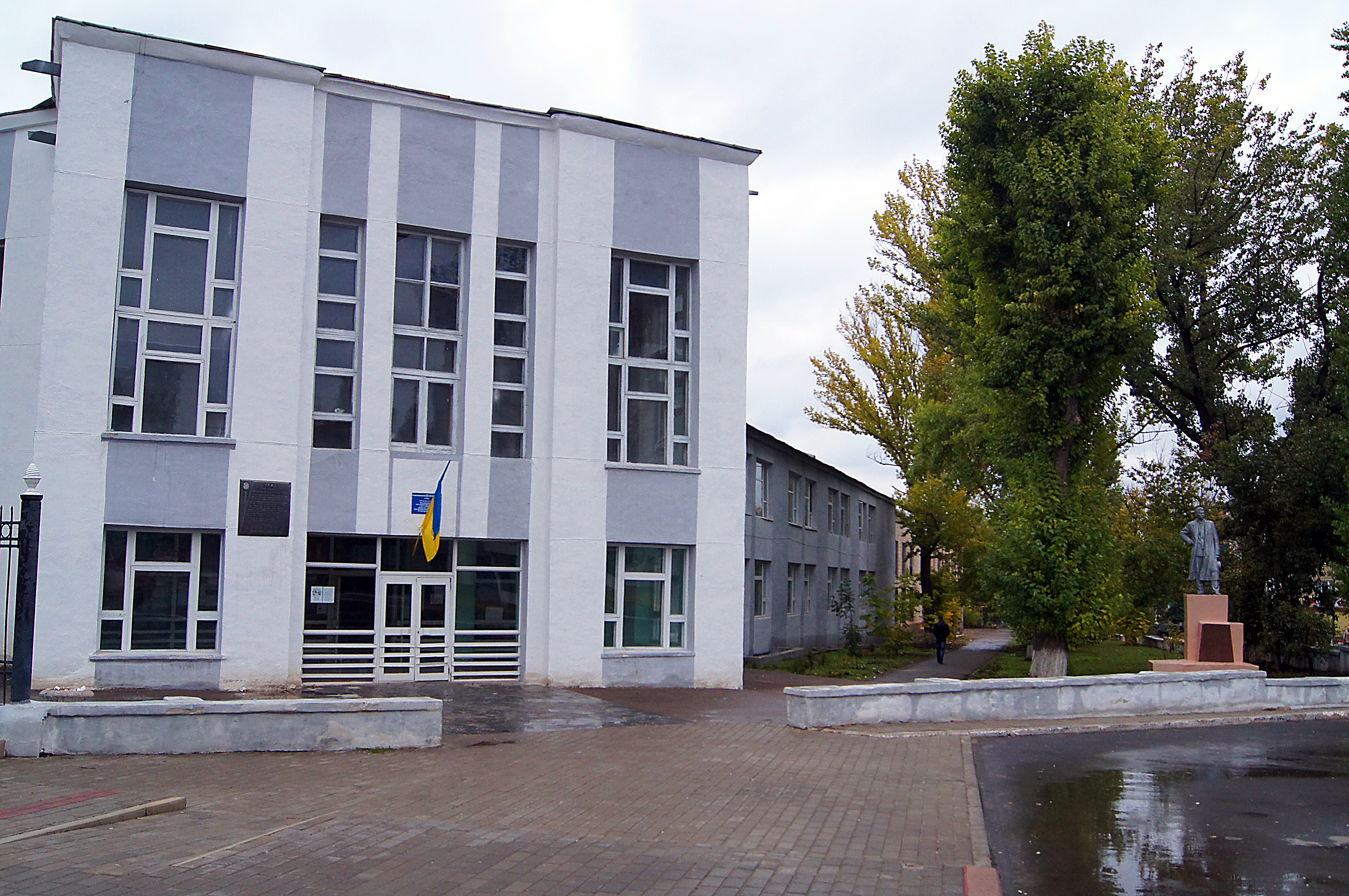
School No. 1

== Notable people ==
- Denys Berinchyk (born 1988), Ukrainian boxer and WBO lightweight champion

== See also ==
- Oleg Koshevoy
- Ivan Turkenich
